= List of Dreamcast games =

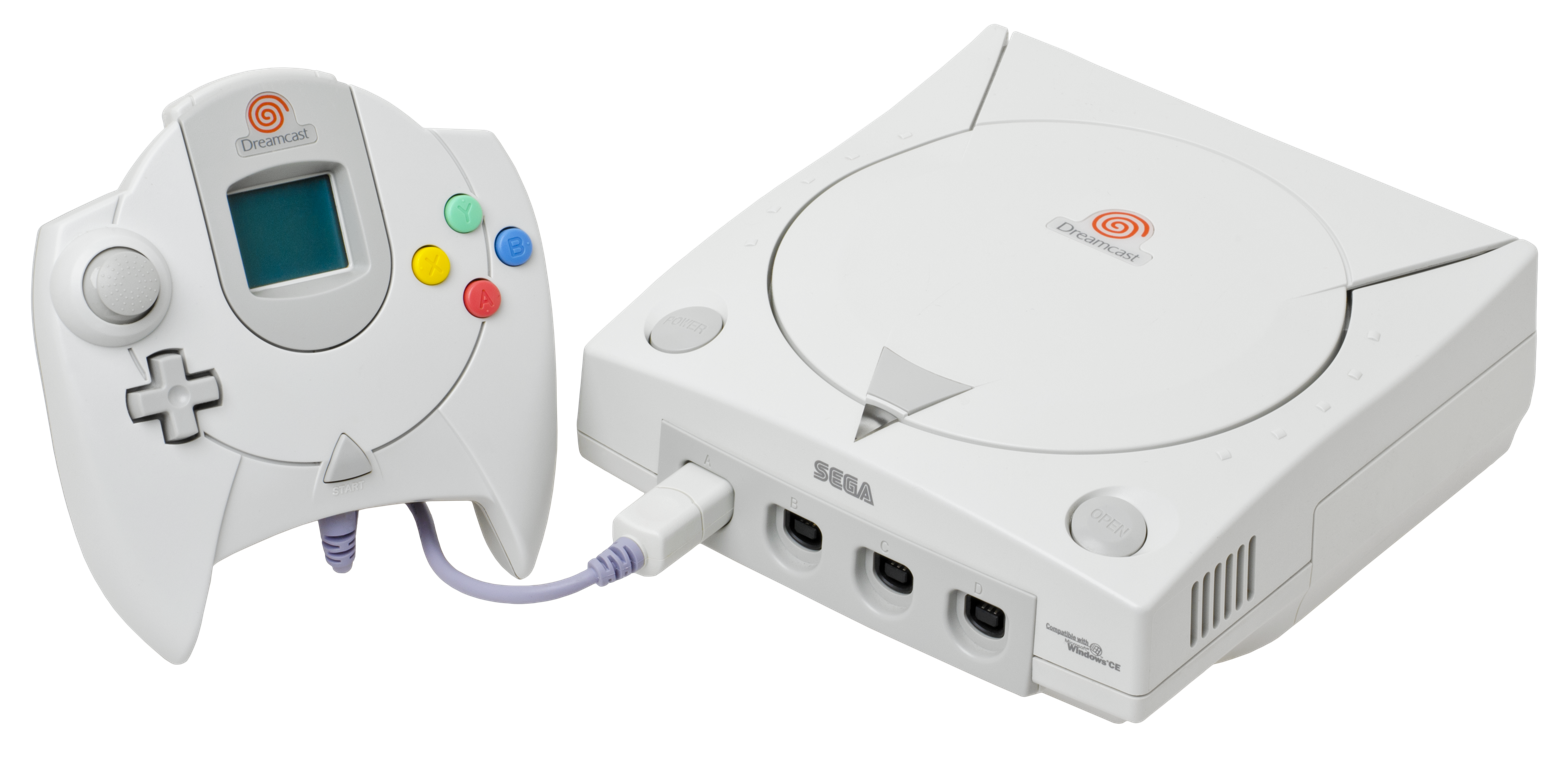
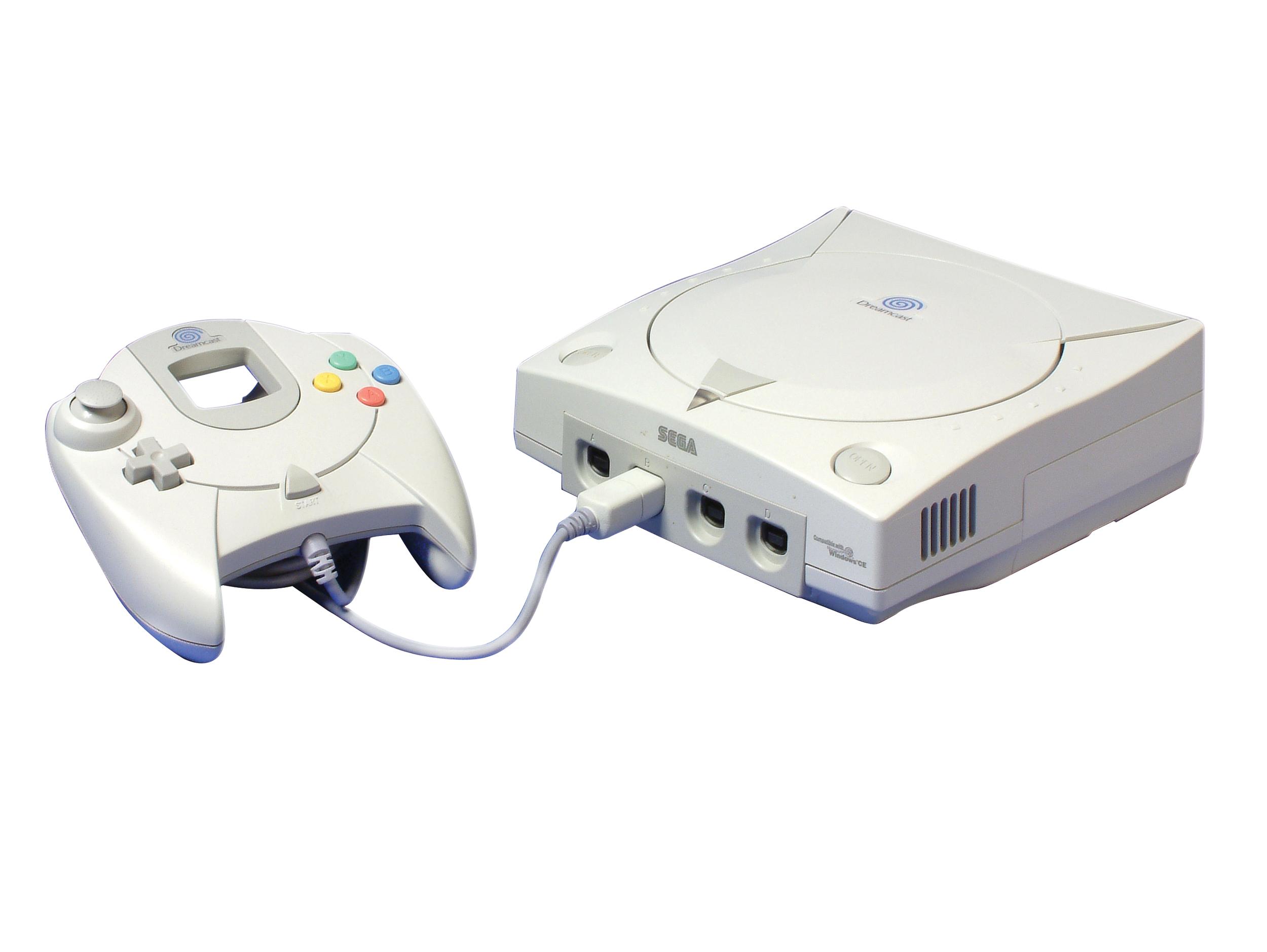
The NTSC (top) and PAL (bottom) Dreamcast

The Dreamcast (Note: Japanese: ドリームキャスト, Hepburn: Dorīmukyasuto) is a home video game console developed and sold by Sega. The first of the sixth generation of video game consoles, it was released in Japan on November 27, 1998, in North America on September 9, 1999, and in Europe on October 14, 1999. The fifth and final home console produced by Sega, the Dreamcast is the successor to the Sega Saturn, whose commercial failure prompted the company to release it only four years after its predecessor's initial release.

All licensed games for the Dreamcast were released on the GD-ROM format, a proprietary CD-based optical disc format jointly developed by Sega and Yamaha Corporation that was capable of storing up to 1 GB of data. The Dreamcast itself features regional lockout. While the higher-capacity DVD-ROM format was available during the console's development, its then-fledgling technology was deemed too expensive to implement at the time, which resulted in ramifications for Sega when competitors such as Sony's PlayStation 2 came to market; the Dreamcast was unable to offer DVD movie playback when the general public began switching from VHS to DVD, and its games were unable to take advantage of the DVD's higher storage capacity and lower cost. Furthermore, an exploit in the console's copy protection system via its support for the little-used MIL-CD format effectively allowed users to play many games burned onto CD-Rs, without any hardware modifications.

The Dreamcast's initial release in Japan had four launch titles, which were Virtua Fighter 3tb, Pen Pen TriIcelon, Godzilla Generations, and July. The North American debut featured 19 launch titles, which included highly anticipated ones such as Sonic Adventure, Soulcalibur, and NFL 2K. (Note: The full list of North American launch titles include AeroWings, Airforce Delta, Blue Stinger, Expendable, Flag to Flag, The House of the Dead 2, Hydro Thunder, Monaco Grand Prix, Mortal Kombat Gold, NFL 2K, NFL Blitz 2000, Pen Pen TriIcelon, Power Stone, Ready 2 Rumble Boxing, Sonic Adventure, Soulcalibur, TNN Motorsports Hardcore Heat, Tokyo Xtreme Racer, and TrickStyle.) The European introduction was originally going to feature 10 launch titles, but the list increased to 15 as its delay from the original September 23 launch date allowed the inclusion of a handful of additional titles. (Note: The full list of European launch titles include Blue Stinger, Dynamite Cop, Incoming, Millennium Soldier: Expendable, Monaco Grand Prix, Pen Pen TriIcelon, Power Stone, Ready 2 Rumble Boxing, Sega Rally Championship 2, Sonic Adventure, Speed Devils, TrickStyle, Tokyo Highway Challenge, Toy Commander, and Virtua Fighter 3tb.) Due to the similarity of the Dreamcast's hardware with Sega's own New Arcade Operation Machine Idea (NAOMI) arcade board, it saw several near-identical ports of arcade games. Plus, since the Dreamcast's hardware used parts similar to those found in personal computers (PCs) of the era, specifically ones with Pentium II and III processors, it also saw a handful of ports of PC games. American third-party publisher Electronic Arts, which had extensively supported Sega's prior consoles beginning with the Sega Genesis, elected not to develop games for the Dreamcast due to a dispute with Sega over licensing. (Note: EA's then-chief creative officer Bing Gordon stated that, factoring concerns held by personnel at the company over the console's hardware, the company made its decision when Sega asserted its inability to "give us [EA] the same kind of license that EA has had over the last five years." However, Bernie Stolar, then-president of Sega of America, stated that Larry Probst, then-president of EA, was adamant about making EA Sports the exclusive sports brand for the console during negotiations; Stolar insisted that EA's decision was in response to him declining the proposal due to Sega's then-recent purchase of sports game developer Visual Concepts for $10 million.)

Sega discontinued the Dreamcast's hardware in March 2001, and software support quickly dwindled as a result. Software largely trickled to a stop by 2002 with the last games released for Europe and North America coming out that year, though games continued to release in Japan during the sixth console gen with the Dreamcast's final licensed game on GD-ROM was Karous, released on March 8, 2007, nearly coinciding with the end of GD-ROM production the previous month. Sega also assisted later with a reprint of Border Down, sold at Japanese retailers in January 2008. The final first-party game for the Dreamcast was Puyo Puyo Fever, released as a Japanese exclusive on February 24, 2004.

This list documents all officially released and homebrew games for the Dreamcast. It does not include any cancelled games, which are documented at the list of cancelled Dreamcast games.

== Licensed games ==
There are 619 (Note: This number is always up to date by this script) games that are known to have released on the console:

Title(s)	Developer(s)	Publisher(s)	First released	Release date		
Title(s)	Developer(s)	Publisher(s)	First released	JP	NA	PAL
4 Wheel Thunder	Kalisto Entertainment	Midway	2000-05-02^{NA}	Unreleased	May 2, 2000	June 9, 2000
4x4 Evo	Terminal Reality	Gathering of Developers	2000-10-26^{NA}	Unreleased	October 26, 2000	Unreleased
18 Wheeler: American Pro Trucker	Sega AM2	Sega	2000-10-12^{JP}	October 12, 2000	May 22, 2001	June 1, 2001
21: Two One	PrincessSoft	PrincessSoft	2001-12-27^{JP}	December 27, 2001	Unreleased	Unreleased
90 Minutes: Sega Championship Football; J.League Spectacle Soccer^{JP}	Smilebit	Sega	2001-10-25^{PAL}	February 7, 2002	Unreleased	October 25, 2001
102 Dalmatians: Puppies to the Rescue	Prolific Publishing	Eidos Interactive	2000-11-14^{NA}	Unreleased	November 14, 2000	December 20, 2000
Advanced Daisenryaku 2001	SystemSoft	Sega	2001-04-26^{JP}	April 26, 2001	Unreleased	Unreleased
Advanced Daisenryaku: Europe no Arashi - Doitsu Dengeki Sakusen	SystemSoft	Sega	2000-06-22^{JP}	June 22, 2000	Unreleased	Unreleased
Aero Dancing F: Todoroki Tsubasa no Hatsu Hikou	CRI	CRI	2000-11-16^{JP}	November 16, 2000	Unreleased	Unreleased
Aero Dancing i	CRI	CRI	2001-02-15^{JP}	February 15, 2001	Unreleased	Unreleased
Aero Dancing i: Jikai Sakuma de Machite Masen	CRI	CRI	2001-08-23^{JP}	August 23, 2001	Unreleased	Unreleased
Aero Dancing: Torodoki Taichou no Himitsu Disc	CRI	CRI	2000-01-20^{JP}	January 20, 2000	Unreleased	Unreleased
AeroWings; Aero Dancing featuring Blue Impulse^{JP}	CRI	CRI^{JP} Crave Entertainment^{WW}	1999-03-04^{JP}	March 4, 1999	September 9, 1999	October 29, 1999
AeroWings 2: Air Strike; Aero Dancing F^{JP}	CRI	CRI^{JP} Crave Entertainment^{WW}	2000-02-24^{JP}	February 24, 2000	August 8, 2000	December 8, 2000
After...: Wasureenu Kizuna	Ciel	Pionesoft	2004-02-26^{JP}	February 26, 2004	Unreleased	Unreleased
Aikagi: Hidamari to Kanojo no Heyagi	F&C・FC02	NEC Interchannel	2003-08-07^{JP}	August 7, 2003	Unreleased	Unreleased
Air	Key	NEC Interchannel	2001-09-20^{JP}	September 20, 2001	Unreleased	Unreleased
Airforce Delta; Deadly Skies^{PAL}	Konami Computer Entertainment Yokohama	Konami	1999-07-29^{JP}	July 29, 1999	September 9, 1999	February 18, 2000
Alien Front Online	Wow Entertainment	Sega	2001-08-07^{NA}	Unreleased	August 7, 2001	Unreleased
Alone in the Dark: The New Nightmare	Darkworks	Infogrames	2001-06-22^{PAL}	Unreleased	September 24, 2001	June 22, 2001
Angel Present	HuneX	NEC Interchannel	2001-04-12^{JP}	April 12, 2001	Unreleased	Unreleased
Angel Wish: Kimi no Egao ni Chu!	Favourite	Pionesoft	2005-02-24^{JP}	February 24, 2005	Unreleased	Unreleased
Animastar	AKI	AKI	2000-06-15^{JP}	June 15, 2000	Unreleased	Unreleased
Aqua GT	East Point Software	Take-Two Interactive	2000-12-22^{PAL}	Unreleased	Unreleased	December 22, 2000
Armada	Metro3D	Metro3D	1999-11-26^{NA}	Unreleased	November 26, 1999	Unreleased
Army Men: Sarge's Heroes	Saffire	Midway	2000-10-31^{NA}	Unreleased	October 31, 2000	November 17, 2000
Atari Anniversary Edition	Digital Eclipse	Infogrames	2001-06-26^{NA}	Unreleased	June 26, 2001	Unreleased
Atsumare! GuruGuru Onsen	Sega AM7	Sega	1999-09-23^{JP}	September 23, 1999	Unreleased	Unreleased
Atsumare! GuruGuru Onsen BB	Overworks	Sega	2000-10-31^{JP}	October 31, 2000	Unreleased	Unreleased
Baldr Force EXE	Giga	Alchemist	2004-10-28^{JP}	October 28, 2004	Unreleased	Unreleased
Bang! Gunship Elite	RayLand	Red Storm Entertainment	2000-12-22^{NA}	Unreleased	December 22, 2000	Unreleased
Bangai-O	Treasure	Entertainment Software Publishing^{JP} Swing! Entertainment Media AG^{PAL} Conspiracy Entertainment^{NA}	1999-12-09^{JP}	December 9, 1999	March 21, 2001	October 20, 2000
Bass Rush Dream: EcoGear PowerWorm Championship	Visco	Visco	2000-12-21^{JP}	December 21, 2000	Unreleased	Unreleased
Battle Beaster	Studio Wonder Effect	Studio Wonder Effect	2001-03-15^{JP}	March 15, 2001	Unreleased	Unreleased
BikkuriMan 2000 Viva! Festival!	Sega Toys	Sega Toys	2000-05-02^{JP}	May 2, 2000	Unreleased	Unreleased
BioHazard Code: Veronica Kanzenban	Capcom	Capcom	2001-03-22^{JP}	March 22, 2001	Unreleased	Unreleased
Black/Matrix Advanced	Flight-Plan	NEC Interchannel	1999-09-30^{JP}	September 30, 1999	Unreleased	Unreleased
Blue-Sky-Blue: Sora o Mau Tsubasa	EMU	Reindeer	2003-06-26^{JP}	June 26, 2003	Unreleased	Unreleased
Blue Stinger	Climax Graphics	Sega^{JP} Activision^{WW}	1999-03-25^{JP}	March 25, 1999	September 9, 1999	October 14, 1999
Ao no Roku-gō: Saigetsu Fumachibito -Time and Tide	Sega	Sega	2000-12-07^{JP}	December 7, 2000	Unreleased	Unreleased
Bokomu no Tatsujin	Fujicom	Fujicom	2002-01-24^{JP}	January 24, 2002	Unreleased	Unreleased
Boku no Tennis Jinsei	Bimboosoft	Bimboosoft	2001-09-20^{JP}	September 20, 2001	Unreleased	Unreleased
Boku to, Bokura no Natsu	KID	KID	2002-09-26^{JP}	September 26, 2002	Unreleased	Unreleased
Boku, Doraemon	Sega Toys	Sega Toys	2001-01-25^{JP}	January 25, 2001	Unreleased	Unreleased
Bomber Hehhe!	Fujicom	Fujicom	2002-01-10^{JP}	January 10, 2002	Unreleased	Unreleased
Bomberman Online	h.a.n.d.; Hudson Soft	Sega	2001-10-30^{NA}	Unreleased	October 30, 2001	Unreleased
Border Down	G.rev	G.rev	2003-09-25^{JP}	September 25, 2003	Unreleased	Unreleased
Bounty Hunter Sara: Holy Mountain no Teiou	Flagship	Capcom	2001-05-24^{JP}	May 24, 2001	Unreleased	Unreleased
Bust-A-Move 4^{WW} Puzzle Bobble 4^{JP}	Taito	CyberFront^{JP} Club Acclaim^{WW}	2000-03-16^{JP}	March 16, 2000	June 1, 2000	June 9, 2000
Buzz Lightyear of Star Command	Traveller's Tales	Activision	2000-10-04^{NA}	Unreleased	October 4, 2000	February 9, 2001
Caesars Palace 2000	Runecraft	Interplay Entertainment	2000-09-20^{NA}	Unreleased	September 20, 2000	June 16, 2000
Cafe Little Wish	Patissier	PrincessSoft	2003-05-29^{JP}	May 29, 2003	Unreleased	Unreleased
Canaria: Kono Omoi o Uta ni Nosete	Front Wing; HuneX	NEC Interchannel	2001-08-23^{JP}	August 23, 2001	Unreleased	Unreleased
Candy Stripe: Minarai Tenshi	Wow Entertainment	Sega	2001-10-25^{JP}	October 25, 2001	Unreleased	Unreleased
Cannon Spike	Psikyo	Capcom^{JP/NA} Bigben Interactive^{PAL}	2000-11-15^{NA}	December 21, 2000	November 15, 2000	April 26, 2002
Canvas: Sepia Iro no Motif	Cocktail Soft	NEC Interchannel	2001-04-05^{JP}	April 5, 2001	Unreleased	Unreleased
Capcom vs. SNK: Millennium Fight 2000	Capcom Production Studio 1	Capcom^{JP/NA} Virgin Interactive Entertainment^{PAL}	2000-09-06^{JP}	September 6, 2000	November 8, 2000	December 15, 2000
Capcom vs. SNK: Millennium Fight 2000 Pro	Capcom Production Studio 1	Capcom	2001-06-14^{JP}	June 14, 2001	Unreleased	Unreleased
Capcom vs. SNK 2: Millionaire Fighting 2001	Capcom	Capcom	2001-09-13^{JP}	September 13, 2001	Unreleased	Unreleased
Card Captor Sakura: Tomoyo no Video Daisakusen	Sega Rosso	Sega	2000-12-28^{JP}	December 28, 2000	Unreleased	Unreleased
Card of Destiny: Hikari to Yami no Tougoumono	Abel	Abel	2002-03-28^{JP}	March 28, 2002	Unreleased	Unreleased
Carrier	Jaleco	Jaleco^{JP/NA} Xicat Interactive^{PAL}	2000-02-24^{JP}	February 24, 2000	February 29, 2000	July 5, 2001
Castle Fantasia Seima Taisen	AGREE	Symbio Planning	2002-07-11^{JP}	July 11, 2002	Unreleased	Unreleased
Centipede	Leaping Lizard Software	Hasbro Interactive	1999-11-23^{NA}	Unreleased	November 23, 1999	Unreleased
Championship Surfer	Krome Studios	Mattel Interactive^{NA} GAME Studios^{PAL}	2000-12-04^{NA}	Unreleased	December 4, 2000	August 10, 2001
Chaos Field	MileStone Inc.	MileStone Inc.	2004-12-16^{JP}	December 16, 2004	Unreleased	Unreleased
Charge 'n Blast	CRI; SIMS	SIMS^{JP} Xicat Interactive^{WW}	2000-12-07^{JP}	December 7, 2000	February 7, 2001	June 29, 2001
Cherry Blossom	Takuyo	Takuyo	2004-04-28^{JP}	April 28, 2004	Unreleased	Unreleased
Chicken Run	Blitz Games	Eidos Interactive	2000-11-13^{NA}	Unreleased	November 13, 2000	November 24, 2000
Chocolat: Maid Cafe "Curio"	Giga	Alchemist	2003-12-25^{JP}	December 25, 2003	Unreleased	Unreleased
Chou-Hatsumei Boy Kanipan: Bousou Robot no Nazo!?	Sega	Sega	1999-07-08^{JP}	July 8, 1999	Unreleased	Unreleased
Christmas Seaman	Vivarium	Vivarium	1999-12-16^{JP}	December 16, 1999	Unreleased	Unreleased
ChuChu Rocket!	Sonic Team	Sega	1999-11-11^{JP}	November 11, 1999	March 7, 2000	June 9, 2000
Cleopatra Fortune	Altron	Altron	2001-06-21^{JP}	June 21, 2001	Unreleased	Unreleased
Close to: Inori no Oka	KID	KID	2001-04-19^{JP}	April 19, 2001	Unreleased	Unreleased
Coaster Works; Jet Coaster Dream^{JP}	Bimboosoft	Bottom Up^{JP} Xicat Interactive^{WW}	1999-12-09^{JP}	December 9, 1999	April 3, 2001	June 29, 2001
Comic Party	Aquaplus	Aquaplus	2001-08-09^{JP}	August 9, 2001	Unreleased	Unreleased
Confidential Mission	Hitmaker	Sega	2001-05-14^{NA}	June 14, 2001	May 14, 2001	May 25, 2001
Conflict Zone	MASA Group	Ubi Soft	2001-12-15^{NA}	Unreleased	December 15, 2001	April 26, 2002
Cool Cool Toon	SNK	SNK	2000-08-10^{JP}	August 10, 2000	Unreleased	Unreleased
Cosmic Smash	Sega Rosso	Sega	2001-09-13^{JP}	September 13, 2001	Unreleased	Unreleased
CR Hissatsu Shigotonin Pachitte Chonmage @ VPACHI	Hackberry	Hackberry	2001-08-02^{JP}	August 2, 2001	Unreleased	Unreleased
Crazy Taxi	Hitmaker	Sega	2000-01-27^{JP}	January 27, 2000	February 2, 2000	February 25, 2000
Crazy Taxi 2	Hitmaker	Sega	2001-05-29^{NA}	May 31, 2001	May 29, 2001	July 6, 2001
Culdcept Second	Omiya Soft	Media Factory	2001-07-12^{JP}	July 12, 2001	Unreleased	Unreleased
Cyber Team in Akihabara: PataPies!	Westone	Sega	1999-07-29^{JP}	July 29, 1999	Unreleased	Unreleased
Cyber Troopers Virtual-On Oratorio Tangram	Sega AM3	Sega^{JP} Activision^{NA}	1999-12-09^{JP}	December 9, 1999	June 7, 2000	Unreleased
D+Vine (Luv)	PrincessSoft	PrincessSoft	2001-10-25^{JP}	October 25, 2001	Unreleased	Unreleased
D2	Warp	Warp^{JP} Sega^{NA}	1999-12-23^{JP}	December 23, 1999	August 22, 2000	Unreleased
Dance Dance Revolution 2ndMix	Konami Computer Entertainment Tokyo	Konami	2000-02-17^{JP}	February 17, 2000	Unreleased	Unreleased
Dance Dance Revolution Club Version Dreamcast Edition	Konami Computer Entertainment Tokyo	Konami	2000-04-27^{JP}	April 27, 2000	Unreleased	Unreleased
Dancing Blade: Katte ni Momotenshi! Kanzenban	Konami Computer Entertainment Tokyo	Konami	1999-09-02^{JP}	September 2, 1999	Unreleased	Unreleased
Dancing Blade Katte ni Momotenshi II: Tears of Eden Kanzenban	Konami Computer Entertainment Tokyo	Konami	1999-09-30^{JP}	September 30, 1999	Unreleased	Unreleased
Dave Mirra Freestyle BMX	Z-Axis	Acclaim Max Sports	2000-11-21^{NA}	Unreleased	November 21, 2000	December 8, 2000
Daytona USA 2001^{WW} Daytona USA^{NA}	Amusement Vision; Genki	Sega; Hasbro Interactive^{JP/NA} Infogrames^{PAL}	2000-12-21^{JP}	December 21, 2000	March 12, 2001	May 11, 2001
Dead or Alive 2	Team Ninja	Tecmo^{JP/NA} Acclaim Entertainment^{PAL}	2000-02-29^{NA}	September 28, 2000	February 29, 2000	April 28, 2000
Death Crimson 2: Meranito no Saidan	Ecole	Ecole	1999-11-25^{JP}	November 25, 1999	Unreleased	Unreleased
Death Crimson OX	Ecole	Ecole^{JP} Sammy Entertainment^{NA}	2001-05-10^{JP}	May 10, 2001	August 8, 2001	Unreleased
Deep Fighter	Criterion Games	Ubi Soft	2000-08-23^{NA}	Unreleased	August 23, 2000	September 22, 2000
De La Jet Set Radio	Smilebit	Sega	2001-01-01^{JP}	January 1, 2001	Unreleased	Unreleased
Demolition Racer: No Exit	Pitbull Syndicate	Infogrames North America	2000-10-25^{NA}	Unreleased	October 25, 2000	Unreleased
Dengen Tenshi Taisen Mahjong: Shangri-La	Marvelous Entertainment	Marvelous Entertainment	1999-11-25^{JP}	November 25, 1999	Unreleased	Unreleased
Denpa Shonenteki Kenshoseikatsu Soft Nasubi no Heya	Hudson Soft	Hudson Soft	1999-07-22^{JP}	July 22, 1999	Unreleased	Unreleased
Densha de Go! 2	Taito	Taito	2000-01-20^{JP}	January 20, 2000	Unreleased	Unreleased
Derby Tsuku: Derby Ba o Tsukurou!	Smilebit; Team Land Ho!	Sega	2000-07-27^{JP}	July 27, 2000	Unreleased	Unreleased
Derby Tsuku 2	Smilebit	Sega	2001-08-09^{JP}	August 9, 2001	Unreleased	Unreleased
DeSpiria	Atlus	Atlus	2000-09-21^{JP}	September 21, 2000	Unreleased	Unreleased
Di Gi Charat Fantasy	Westone	Broccoli	2001-09-06^{JP}	September 6, 2001	Unreleased	Unreleased
Digital Keiba Shinbun: My Trackman	Shouei System	Shouei System	1999-04-08^{NA}	April 8, 1999	Unreleased	Unreleased
Dino Crisis	Nextech	Capcom^{JP/NA} Virgin Interactive Entertainment^{PAL}	2000-09-06^{JP}	September 6, 2000	November 15, 2000	December 22, 2000
Dinosaur	Ubi Soft Paris	Ubi Soft	2000-11-24^{PAL}	Unreleased	November 28, 2000	November 24, 2000
Doguu Senki: Haou	Victor Interactive Software	Victor Interactive Software	2000-08-10^{JP}	August 10, 2000	Unreleased	Unreleased
Doki Doki Idol Star Seeker Remix	G.rev	G.rev	2002-01-31^{JP}	January 31, 2002	Unreleased	Unreleased
Donald Duck: Goin' Quackers; Donald Duck: Quack Attack^{PAL}	Ubi Soft Casablanca	Ubi Soft	2000-12-13^{NA}	Unreleased	December 13, 2000	December 15, 2000
Dousoukai 2 Again & Refrain	NEC Interchannel	NEC Interchannel	2002-06-27^{JP}	June 27, 2002	Unreleased	Unreleased
Draconus: Cult of the Wyrm; Dragon's Blood^{PAL}	Treyarch	Crave Entertainment^{NA} Interplay Entertainment^{PAL}	2000-06-23^{NA}	Unreleased	June 23, 2000	June 30, 2000
Dragon Riders: Chronicles of Pern	Ubi Studios UK	Ubi Soft	2001-08-08^{NA}	Unreleased	August 8, 2001	February 8, 2002
Ducati World Racing Challenge	Attention to Detail	Acclaim Entertainment	2001-02-13^{NA}	Unreleased	February 13, 2001	March 9, 2001
Dynamite Cop	Sega AM1	Sega	1999-05-27^{JP}	May 27, 1999	November 2, 1999	October 14, 1999
Ecco the Dolphin: Defender of the Future	Appaloosa Interactive	Sega	2000-06-16^{PAL}	January 25, 2001	August 15, 2000	June 16, 2000
ECW Anarchy Rulz	Acclaim Studios Salt Lake City	Acclaim Entertainment	2000-11-28^{NA}	Unreleased	November 28, 2000	February 9, 2001
ECW Hardcore Revolution	Acclaim Studios Salt Lake City	Acclaim Entertainment	2000-02-29^{NA}	Unreleased	February 29, 2000	March 17, 2000
Eisei Meijin III: Game Creator Yoshimura Nobuhiro no Zunou	Konami Computer Entertainment Tokyo	Konami	1999-07-08^{JP}	July 8, 1999	Unreleased	Unreleased
El Dorado Gate Volume 1	Capcom	Capcom	2000-10-10^{JP}	October 10, 2000	Unreleased	Unreleased
El Dorado Gate Volume 2	Capcom	Capcom	2000-12-12^{JP}	December 12, 2000	Unreleased	Unreleased
El Dorado Gate Volume 3	Capcom	Capcom	2001-02-02^{JP}	February 2, 2001	Unreleased	Unreleased
El Dorado Gate Volume 4	Capcom	Capcom	2001-04-12^{JP}	April 12, 2001	Unreleased	Unreleased
El Dorado Gate Volume 5	Capcom	Capcom	2001-06-06^{JP}	June 6, 2001	Unreleased	Unreleased
El Dorado Gate Volume 6	Capcom	Capcom	2001-08-08^{JP}	August 8, 2001	Unreleased	Unreleased
El Dorado Gate Volume 7	Capcom	Capcom	2001-10-10^{JP}	October 10, 2001	Unreleased	Unreleased
Elemental Gimmick Gear	Birthday	Hudson Soft^{JP} Vatical Entertainment^{NA}	1999-05-27^{JP}	May 27, 1999	December 28, 1999	Unreleased
Elysion: Eien no Sanctuary	Terios	NEC Interchannel	2002-07-25^{JP}	July 25, 2002	Unreleased	Unreleased
Erde: Nezu no Kinoshitade	KID	KID	2003-08-07^{JP}	August 7, 2003	Unreleased	Unreleased
Es	Foursome	TV Asahi / Sega	2001-04-05^{JP}	April 5, 2001	Unreleased	Unreleased
ESPN International Track & Field	Konami Computer Entertainment Osaka	Konami	2000-08-31^{JP}	August 31, 2000	September 27, 2000	September 22, 2000
ESPN NBA 2Night	Sunset Entertainment	Konami	2000-11-20^{NA}	Unreleased	November 20, 2000	Unreleased
European Super League	Crimson; Coyote Developments	Virgin Interactive Entertainment	2001-03-02^{PAL}	Unreleased	Unreleased	March 2, 2001
Eve Zero Kanzenban: Ark of the Matter	C's ware	NetVillage	2001-03-22^{JP}	March 22, 2001	Unreleased	Unreleased
Ever 17: The Out of Infinity	KID	KID	2002-08-29^{JP}	August 29, 2002	Unreleased	Unreleased
Ever 17: The Out of Infinity: Premium Edition	KID	KID	2003-11-27^{JP}	November 27, 2003	Unreleased	Unreleased
Evil Dead: Hail to the King	Heavy Iron Studios	THQ	2000-12-19^{NA}	Unreleased	December 19, 2000	June 22, 2001
Evil Twin: Cyprien's Chronicles	In Utero	BigBen Interactive	2002-04-26^{PAL}	Unreleased	Unreleased	April 26, 2002
Evolution: The World of Sacred Device	Sting	Sega / Entertainment Software Publishing^{JP} Ubi Soft^{WW}	1999-01-21^{JP}	January 21, 1999	December 16, 1999	June 9, 2000
Evolution 2: Far Off Promise	Sting	Entertainment Software Publishing^{JP} Ubi Soft^{WW}	1999-12-23^{JP}	December 23, 1999	June 29, 2000	November 23, 2001
Exhibition of Speed	Player 1	Titus Interactive	2001-05-18^{PAL}	Unreleased	Unreleased	May 18, 2001
Exodus Guilty Neos	Abel	Abel	2001-05-31^{JP}	May 31, 2001	Unreleased	Unreleased
F1 World Grand Prix	Video System	Sega^{WW} Video System^{JP}	1999-11-19^{PAL}	November 25, 1999	April 25, 2000	November 19, 1999
F1 World Grand Prix II	Video System	Video System^{JP} Sega^{PAL}	2000-11-22^{JP}	November 22, 2000	Unreleased	November 24, 2000
F1 Racing Championship	Ubi Soft	Video System	2001-01-19^{PAL}	Unreleased	Unreleased	January 19, 2001
F355 Challenge: Passione Rossa	Sega AM2; CRI	Sega^{JP} Acclaim Entertainment^{WW}	2000-08-03^{JP}	August 3, 2000	September 22, 2000	October 20, 2000
Fatal Fury: Mark of the Wolves; Garou: Mark of the Wolves^{JP}	SNK	SNK^{JP} Agetec^{NA}	2001-09-27^{JP}	September 27, 2001	November 23, 2001	Unreleased
Fighting Force 2	Core Design	Eidos Interactive	1999-12-22^{NA}	Unreleased	December 22, 1999	December 24, 1999
Fighting Vipers 2	CRI; Scarab	Sega	2001-01-18^{JP}	January 18, 2001	Unreleased	March 9, 2001
Fire Pro Wrestling D	S-Neo	Spike	2001-03-01^{JP}	March 1, 2001	Unreleased	Unreleased
First Kiss Story II: Anata ga Iru Kara	HuneX; M2	Broccoli	2002-08-08^{JP}	August 8, 2002	Unreleased	Unreleased
Flag to Flag; Super Speed Racing^{JP}	Zoom	Sega	1999-03-25^{JP}	March 25, 1999	September 9, 1999	Unreleased
Floigan Bros.	Visual Concepts	Sega	2001-07-30^{NA}	Unreleased	July 30, 2001	November 23, 2001
For Symphony: With All One's Heart	Takuyo	Takuyo	2003-07-31^{JP}	July 31, 2003	Unreleased	Unreleased
Fragrance Tale	Takuyo	Takuyo	2001-07-26^{JP}	July 26, 2001	Unreleased	Unreleased
Frame Gride	FromSoftware	FromSoftware	1999-07-15^{JP}	July 15, 1999	Unreleased	Unreleased
Frogger 2: Swampy's Revenge	Blitz Games	Hasbro Interactive	2000-10-12^{NA}	Unreleased	October 12, 2000	Unreleased
Fur Fighters	Bizarre Creations	Acclaim Entertainment	2000-06-23^{PAL}	Unreleased	July 13, 2000	June 23, 2000
Fushigi no Dungeon: Fuurai no Shiren Gaiden: Onnakenshi Asuka Kenzan!	Neverland; Chunsoft	Sega	2002-02-07^{JP}	February 7, 2002	Unreleased	Unreleased
Gaia Master Kessen! Seikiou Densetsu	Capcom	Capcom	2001-06-28^{JP}	June 28, 2001	Unreleased	Unreleased
Gakkyuu Ou Yamazaki: Yamazaki Oukoku Daifunsou!	Sega	Sega	1999-12-23^{JP}	December 23, 1999	Unreleased	Unreleased
Gauntlet Legends	Midway Games West	Midway	2000-06-06^{NA}	Unreleased	June 6, 2000	July 21, 2000
Get!! Colonies	Midnight Synergy; Sega	Sega	2000-03-30^{JP}	March 30, 2000	Unreleased	Unreleased
Giant Gram 2000: Zen Nihon Pro Wres 3 Eikou no Yuushatachi	Sega AM1; Scarab; Wow Entertainment	Sega	2000-08-10^{JP}	August 10, 2000	Unreleased	Unreleased
Giant Gram: Zen Nihon Pro Wres 2 in Nihon Budoukan	Sega AM1; Scarab	Sega	1999-06-24^{JP}	June 24, 1999	Unreleased	Unreleased
Giant Killers	IO Productions; Smoking Gun Productions	AAA Game	2001-05-11^{PAL}	Unreleased	Unreleased	May 11, 2001
Giga Wing	Takumi Corporation	Capcom^{JP/NA} Virgin Interactive Entertainment^{PAL}	1999-11-11^{JP}	November 11, 1999	July 18, 2000	October 20, 2000
Giga Wing 2	Takumi Corporation	Capcom	2001-01-18^{JP}	January 18, 2001	May 16, 2001	Unreleased
Godzilla Generations	General Entertainment	Sega	1998-11-27^{JP}	November 27, 1998	Unreleased	Unreleased
Godzilla Generations: Maximum Impact	General Entertainment	Sega	1999-12-23^{JP}	December 23, 1999	Unreleased	Unreleased
Golem no Maigo	CaramelPot	CaramelPot	2000-02-24^{JP}	February 24, 2000	Unreleased	Unreleased
Golf Shiyouyo 2: Aratanaru Chousen	SoftMax	SoftMax	2001-01-25^{JP}	January 25, 2001	Unreleased	Unreleased
Golf Shiyouyo Adventure Hen	SoftMax	SoftMax	2000-08-03^{JP}	August 3, 2000	Unreleased	Unreleased
Golf Shiyouyo Kouryaku Pack	SoftMax	SoftMax	2000-06-01^{JP}	June 1, 2000	Unreleased	Unreleased
Grand Theft Auto 2	DMA Design	Rockstar Games	2000-05-01^{NA}	Unreleased	May 1, 2000	July 28, 2000
Grandia II	Game Arts	Game Arts^{JP} Ubi Soft^{WW}	2000-08-03^{JP}	August 3, 2000	December 5, 2000	February 23, 2001
The Grinch	Artificial Mind and Movement	Konami	2000-11-22^{NA}	Unreleased	November 22, 2000	December 15, 2000
Guilty Gear X	Arc System Works	Sammy Studios	2000-12-14^{JP}	December 14, 2000	Unreleased	Unreleased
Gunbird 2	Psikyo	Capcom^{JP/NA} Virgin Interactive Entertainment^{PAL}	2000-03-09^{JP}	March 9, 2000	November 15, 2000	February 2, 2001
Gundam Battle Online	Bandai	Bandai	2001-06-28^{JP}	June 28, 2001	Unreleased	Unreleased
Gundam Side Story 0079: Rise from the Ashes	BEC	Bandai	1999-08-26^{JP}	August 26, 1999	April 28, 2000	Unreleased
Guruguru Onsen 2	Overworks	Sega	2001-08-09^{JP}	August 9, 2001	Unreleased	Unreleased
Guruguru Onsen 3	Overworks	Sega	2002-03-14^{JP}	March 14, 2002	Unreleased	Unreleased
Hanagumi Taisen Columns 2	Tenky; Sega AM7; Red Company	Sega	2000-01-06^{JP}	January 6, 2000	Unreleased	Unreleased
Happy Breeding	PrincessSoft	PrincessSoft	2003-02-27^{JP}	February 27, 2003	Unreleased	Unreleased
Happy Lesson	Fupac	Datam Polystar	2001-04-26^{JP}	April 26, 2001	Unreleased	Unreleased
Happy Lesson: First Lesson	Fupac	Datam Polystar	2000-09-28^{JP}	September 28, 2000	Unreleased	Unreleased
Harusame Youbi	SIMS	NEC Interchannel	2001-03-22^{JP}	March 22, 2001	Unreleased	Unreleased
Headhunter	Amuze	Sega	2001-11-16^{PAL}	Unreleased	Unreleased	November 16, 2001
Heavy Metal: Geomatrix	Capcom	Capcom	2001-07-12^{JP}	July 12, 2001	September 12, 2001	April 26, 2002
Heisei Mahjong Shou	Micronet	Micronet	2000-10-26^{JP}	October 26, 2000	Unreleased	Unreleased
Hello Kitty no Garden Panic	Fortyfive	Sega	1999-11-25^{JP}	November 25, 1999	Unreleased	Unreleased
Hello Kitty no Lovely Fruit Park	Midnight Synergy; Sega	Sega	1999-11-25^{JP}	November 25, 1999	Unreleased	Unreleased
Hello Kitty no Magical Block	Sega	Sega	2000-03-30^{JP}	March 30, 2000	Unreleased	Unreleased
Hello Kitty no Waku Waku Cookies	Sega	Sega	2000-08-10^{JP}	August 10, 2000	Unreleased	Unreleased
Himitsu: Yui ga Ita Natsu	Starfish	Starfish	2001-07-26^{JP}	July 26, 2001	Unreleased	Unreleased
Hidden & Dangerous	Illusion Softworks	TalonSoft^{NA} Take-Two Interactive^{PAL}	2000-07-31^{NA}	Unreleased	July 31, 2000	September 8, 2000
Hundred Swords	Smilebit	Sega	2001-02-08^{JP}	February 8, 2001	Unreleased	Unreleased
The House of the Dead 2	Sega AM1; CRI	Sega	1999-03-25^{JP}	March 25, 1999	September 9, 1999	November 5, 1999
Hoyle Casino	Sierra On-Line	Sierra Attractions	2000-09-29^{NA}	Unreleased	September 29, 2000	Unreleased
Hydro Thunder	Eurocom	Midway	1999-09-09^{NA}	Unreleased	September 9, 1999	October 24, 1999
Idol Janshi o Tsukucchaou	Jaleco	Jaleco	1999-09-23^{JP}	September 23, 1999	Unreleased	Unreleased
Ikaruga	Treasure	Treasure / Entertainment Software Publishing	2002-09-05^{JP}	September 5, 2002	Unreleased	Unreleased
Illbleed	Crazy Games	Crazy Games^{JP} AIA^{NA}	2001-03-29^{JP}	March 29, 2001	April 16, 2001	Unreleased
Incoming	Rage Software	Imagineer^{JP} Interplay^{NA} Rage Software^{PAL}	1998-12-17^{JP}	December 17, 1998	September 15, 1999	October 14, 1999
Industrial Spy: Operation Espionage	HuneX	NEC Home Electronics^{JP} UFO Interactive Games^{NA}	1999-09-23^{JP}	September 23, 1999	June 1, 2000	Unreleased
Interlude	Longshot	NEC Interchannel	2003-03-13^{JP}	March 13, 2003	Unreleased	Unreleased
Iris	KID	KID	2003-08-07^{NA}	August 7, 2003	Unreleased	Unreleased
Iron Aces	Marionette	Global A Entertainment^{JP} Xicat Interactive^{WW}	2000-06-29^{JP}	June 29, 2000	February 6, 2001	June 29, 2001
Izumo	Studio e.go!	Symbio Planning	2004-01-29^{JP}	January 29, 2004	Unreleased	Unreleased
J.League Pro Soccer Club o Tsukurou!	Sega R&D6	Sega	1999-09-30^{JP}	September 30, 1999	Unreleased	Unreleased
Jahmong	Visit	Visit	2000-08-31^{JP}	August 31, 2000	Unreleased	Unreleased
Jeremy McGrath Supercross 2000	Acclaim Studios Salt Lake City	Acclaim Sports	2000-08-08^{NA}	Unreleased	August 8, 2000	September 8, 2000
Jet Coaster Dream 2	Bimboosoft	Bimboosoft	2000-11-02^{JP}	November 2, 2000	Unreleased	Unreleased
Jet Set Radio^{WW} Jet Grind Radio^{NA}	Smilebit	Sega	2000-06-29^{JP}	June 29, 2000	October 31, 2000	November 24, 2000
Jikkyou Powerful Pro Yakyū Dreamcast Edition	Konami Computer Entertainment Osaka; Tose	Konami	2000-03-30^{JP}	March 30, 2000	Unreleased	Unreleased
Jimmy White's 2: Cueball	Awesome Developments	Virgin Interactive Entertainment	2000-01-07^{PAL}	Unreleased	Unreleased	January 7, 2000
Jinsei Game for Dreamcast	Takara; KSW	Takara	2000-06-22^{JP}	June 22, 2000	Unreleased	Unreleased
Jissen Pachi-Slot Hisshouhou! @VPACHI: Kongdom	MAXBET; Daikoku	Sammy	2000-09-28^{JP}	September 28, 2000	Unreleased	Unreleased
JoJo's Bizarre Adventure	Capcom	Capcom^{JP/NA} Virgin Interactive Entertainment^{PAL}	1999-11-25^{JP}	November 25, 1999	April 28, 2000	April 28, 2000
JoJo's Bizarre Adventure for Matching Service	Capcom	Capcom	2000-10-26^{JP}	October 26, 2000	Unreleased	Unreleased
July	Fortyfive	Fortyfive	1998-11-27^{JP}	November 27, 1998	Unreleased	Unreleased
Kaen Seibo: The Virgin on Megiddo	Studio Line	Kobi	2001-08-02^{JP}	August 2, 2001	Unreleased	Unreleased
Kaitou Apricot	Takuyo	Takuyo	2003-03-06^{JP}	March 6, 2003	Unreleased	Unreleased
Kanon	Key	NEC Interchannel	2000-09-14^{JP}	September 14, 2000	Unreleased	Unreleased
Karous	MileStone Inc.	MileStone Inc.	2007-03-08^{JP}	March 8, 2007	Unreleased	Unreleased
Kao the Kangaroo	X-Ray Interactive	Titus Interactive	2000-12-08^{PAL}	Unreleased	February 13, 2001	December 8, 2000
Kaze no Uta	Milksoft	Milksoft	2004-04-15^{JP}	April 15, 2004	Unreleased	Unreleased
Kidō Senshi Gundam: Gihren no Yabou – Zeon no Keifu	Bandai	Bandai	2000-06-29^{JP}	June 29, 2000	Unreleased	Unreleased
Kidō Senshi Gundam: Renpō vs. Zeon & DX	Capcom	Bandai	2002-04-11^{JP}	April 11, 2002	Unreleased	Unreleased
Kidou Senkan Nadesico: Nadesico the Mission	Will	Entertainment Software Publishing	1999-08-26^{JP}	August 26, 1999	Unreleased	Unreleased
Kimi ga Nozomu Eien	HuneX	Alchemist	2002-09-26^{JP}	September 26, 2002	Unreleased	Unreleased
The King of Fighters '99: Evolution	SNK	SNK^{JP} Agetec^{NA}	2000-03-30^{JP}	March 30, 2000	May 8, 2001	Unreleased
The King of Fighters: Dream Match 1999	SNK	SNK	1999-06-24^{JP}	June 24, 1999	October 22, 1999	Unreleased
The King of Fighters 2000	Playmore	Playmore	2002-08-08^{JP}	August 8, 2002	Unreleased	Unreleased
The King of Fighters 2001	Eolith; Playmore	Playmore	2002-12-26^{JP}	December 26, 2002	Unreleased	Unreleased
The King of Fighters 2002	Eolith	Playmore	2003-06-19^{JP}	June 19, 2003	Unreleased	Unreleased
Kiss: Psycho Circus: The Nightmare Child	Tremor Entertainment	Take-Two Interactive	2000-11-01^{NA}	Unreleased	November 1, 2000	January 19, 2001
Kita e. Photo Memories	Red Company	Hudson Soft	1999-08-05^{JP}	August 5, 1999	Unreleased	Unreleased
Kita e. White Illumination	Red Company	Hudson Soft	1999-03-18^{JP}	March 18, 1999	Unreleased	Unreleased
Kitahei Gold	SPS	NetVillage	1999-11-18^{JP}	November 18, 1999	Unreleased	Unreleased
Kiteretsu Shounen's Gangagan	Sega	Sega	2000-04-27^{JP}	April 27, 2000	Unreleased	Unreleased
Konohana: True Report	Vridge	Success	2001-04-26^{JP}	April 26, 2001	Unreleased	Unreleased
Konohana 2: Todokanai Requiem	Vridge	Success	2002-11-28^{JP}	November 28, 2002	Unreleased	Unreleased
Kuon no Kizuna: Sairinshou	FOG Inc.	FOG Inc.	2000-05-18^{JP}	May 18, 2000	Unreleased	Unreleased
Lake Masters Pro Dreamcast plus!	Nexus Interact	DaZZ	2000-03-23^{JP}	March 23, 2000	Unreleased	Unreleased
Langrisser Millennium	NCS; Santa Entertainment	Masaya	1999-11-03^{JP}	November 3, 1999	Unreleased	Unreleased
The Last Blade 2: Heart of the Samurai	SNK	SNK^{JP} Agetec^{NA}	2000-12-21^{JP}	December 21, 2000	August 6, 2001	Unreleased
Legacy of Kain: Soul Reaver	Nixxes Software	Eidos Interactive	2000-01-25^{NA}	Unreleased	January 25, 2000	February 25, 2000
L.O.L.: Lack of Love	Love-de-Lic	ASCII Corporation	2000-11-02^{JP}	November 2, 2000	Unreleased	Unreleased
Looney Tunes: Space Race	Infogrames Melbourne House	Infogrames	2000-11-03^{PAL}	Unreleased	November 28, 2000	November 3, 2000
Love Hina: Smile Again	Fortyfive	Sega	2001-03-29^{JP}	March 29, 2001	Unreleased	Unreleased
Love Hina: Totsuzen no Engeji Happening	Fortyfive	Sega	2000-09-28^{JP}	September 28, 2000	Unreleased	Unreleased
Maboroshi Tsukiyo	SIMS	SIMS	1999-09-23^{JP}	September 23, 1999	Unreleased	Unreleased
Macross M3	Warashi	Shōeisha	2001-02-22^{JP}	February 22, 2001	Unreleased	Unreleased
Magic: The Gathering	Sega	Sega	2001-06-28^{JP}	June 28, 2001	Unreleased	Unreleased
Marginal	White Clarity	PrincessSoft	2003-07-17^{JP}	July 17, 2003	Unreleased	Unreleased
Mag Force Racing	VCC Entertainment	Crave Entertainment	2000-07-21^{NA}	Unreleased	July 21, 2000	August 25, 2000
Mahjong Taikai II Special	Koei	Koei	1999-03-04^{JP}	March 4, 1999	Unreleased	Unreleased
Majo no Ochakai	Frontwing	NEC Interchannel	2003-06-26^{JP}	June 26, 2003	Unreleased	Unreleased
Maken X	Atlus	Atlus^{JP} Sega^{WW}	1999-11-25^{JP}	November 25, 1999	April 25, 2000	July 7, 2000
Marie & Elie no Atelier: Salberg no Renkinjutsushi 1-2	Kool Kizz	Kool Kizz	2000-11-15^{JP}	November 15, 2001	Unreleased	Unreleased
Marionette Company	Microcabin	Microcabin	1999-10-07^{JP}	October 7, 1999	Unreleased	Unreleased
Marionette Company 2	Microcabin	Microcabin	2000-05-18^{JP}	May 18, 2000	Unreleased	Unreleased
Marionette Handler	Micronet	Micronet	1999-07-29^{JP}	July 29, 1999	Unreleased	Unreleased
Marionette Handler 2	Micronet	Micronet	2000-11-09^{JP}	November 9, 2000	Unreleased	Unreleased
Mars Matrix	Takumi Corporation	Capcom	2000-11-09^{JP}	November 9, 2000	April 30, 2001	Unreleased
Marvel vs. Capcom: Clash of Super Heroes	Capcom	Capcom^{JP/NA} Virgin Interactive Entertainment^{PAL}	1999-03-25^{JP}	March 25, 1999	October 7, 1999	December 24, 1999
Marvel vs. Capcom 2: New Age of Heroes	Capcom	Capcom^{JP/NA} Virgin Interactive Entertainment^{PAL}	2000-03-30^{JP}	March 30, 2000	June 27, 2000	July 16, 2000
Mat Hoffman's Pro BMX	Runecraft	Activision O2	2001-09-12^{NA}	Unreleased	September 12, 2001	Unreleased
Max Steel: Covert Missions	Treyarch	Mattel Interactive	2000-12-05^{NA}	Unreleased	December 5, 2000	Unreleased
Maximum Pool	Dynamix	Sierra Sports	2000-11-16^{NA}	Unreleased	November 16, 2000	Unreleased
MDK2	BioWare	Interplay Entertainment	2000-03-29^{NA}	Unreleased	March 29, 2000	June 9, 2000
Mei ☆ Puru	PrincessSoft	PrincessSoft	2002-10-24^{JP}	October 24, 2002	Unreleased	Unreleased
Memories Off 2nd	KID	KID	2001-09-27^{JP}	September 27, 2001	Unreleased	Unreleased
Memories Off Complete	KID	KID	2000-06-29^{JP}	June 29, 2000	Unreleased	Unreleased
Mercurius Pretty: End of the Century	Longshot; Stack	NEC Interchannel	2000-11-16^{JP}	November 16, 2000	Unreleased	Unreleased
Metal Wolf	PrincessSoft	PrincessSoft	2002-06-27^{JP}	June 27, 2002	Unreleased	Unreleased
Metropolis Street Racer	Bizarre Creations	Sega	2000-11-03^{PAL}	Unreleased	January 16, 2001	November 3, 2000
Midway's Greatest Hits Volume 1	Digital Eclipse	Midway	2000-06-27^{NA}	Unreleased	June 27, 2000	July 28, 2000
Midway's Greatest Hits Volume 2	Digital Eclipse	Midway	2001-11-15^{NA}	Unreleased	November 15, 2001	Unreleased
Milky Season	KID	KID	2002-02-28^{JP}	February 28, 2002	Unreleased	Unreleased
Millennium Soldier: Expendable; Expendable^{NA}	Rage Software	Imagineer^{JP} Infogrames North America^{NA} Infogrames Multimedia^{PAL}	1999-06-24^{JP}	June 24, 1999	September 9, 1999	October 14, 1999
Miss Moonlight	Spiel	Naxat Soft	2001-06-21^{JP}	June 21, 2001	Unreleased	Unreleased
Missing Parts: The Tantei Stories	O-TWO inc.	FOG Inc.	2002-01-17^{JP}	January 17, 2002	Unreleased	Unreleased
Missing Parts 2: The Tantei Stories	FOG Inc.	FOG Inc.	2002-10-24^{JP}	October 24, 2002	Unreleased	Unreleased
Missing Parts 3: The Tantei Stories	FOG Inc.	FOG Inc.	2003-07-31^{JP}	July 31, 2003	Unreleased	Unreleased
Mizuiro	HuneX	NEC Interchannel	2002-03-07^{JP}	March 7, 2002	Unreleased	Unreleased
Moekan	KeroQ	PrincessSoft	2003-12-25^{JP}	December 25, 2003	Unreleased	Unreleased
MoHo	Lost Toys	Take-Two Interactive	2000-11-24^{PAL}	Unreleased	Unreleased	November 24, 2000
Monaco Grand Prix; Monaco Grand Prix: Racing Simulation 2^{JP} Racing Simulation: Monaco Grand Prix^{PAL}	Ubi Soft Paris	Ubi Soft	1999-03-11^{JP}	March 11, 1999	September 9, 1999	October 14, 1999
Morita no Saikyou Reversi	Random House	Random House	1999-04-15^{JP}	April 15, 1999	Unreleased	Unreleased
Morita no Saikyou Shogi	Random House	Random House	1999-04-15^{JP}	April 15, 1999	Unreleased	Unreleased
Mortal Kombat Gold	Eurocom	Midway	1999-09-09^{NA}	Unreleased	September 9, 1999	October 29, 1999
Motto Pro Yakyū Team o Tsukurou!	Smilebit	Sega	2000-09-28^{JP}	September 28, 2000	Unreleased	Unreleased
Musapey's Choco Marker	Ecole	Ecole	2002-12-26^{JP}	December 26, 2002	Unreleased	Unreleased
Mr. Driller	Namco	Namco^{JP/NA} Virgin Interactive Entertainment^{PAL}	2000-06-23^{NA}	June 29, 2000	June 23, 2000	December 8, 2000
Ms. Pac-Man Maze Madness	Mass Media	Namco	2000-11-13^{NA}	Unreleased	November 13, 2000	Unreleased
MTV Sports: Skateboarding Featuring Andy Macdonald	Darkblack	THQ	2000-10-20^{NA}	Unreleased	October 20, 2000	November 17, 2000
My Merry May	KID	KID	2002-04-25^{JP}	April 25, 2002	Unreleased	Unreleased
My Merry Maybe	KID	KID	2003-07-10^{JP}	July 10, 2003	Unreleased	Unreleased
Nakoruru: Anohito Kara no Okurimono	Kool Kizz	Kool Kizz	2002-03-28^{JP}	March 28, 2002	Unreleased	Unreleased
Nanatsu no Hikan: Senritsu no Bishou	Koei	Koei	2000-01-20^{JP}	January 20, 2000	Unreleased	Unreleased
Namco Museum	Mass Media	Namco	2000-06-25^{NA}	Unreleased	June 25, 2000	Unreleased
Napple Tale: Arsia in Daydream	Chime	Sega	2000-10-19^{JP}	October 19, 2000	Unreleased	Unreleased
NBA 2K	Visual Concepts	Sega	1999-11-11^{NA}	March 23, 2000	November 11, 1999	August 2, 2000
NBA 2K1	Visual Concepts	Sega	2000-10-31^{NA}	March 29, 2001	October 31, 2000	Unreleased
NBA 2K2	Visual Concepts	Sega	2001-10-23^{NA}	May 23, 2002	October 23, 2001	March 8, 2002
NBA Hoopz	Eurocom	Midway	2001-02-15^{NA}	Unreleased	February 15, 2001	April 13, 2001
NBA Showtime: NBA on NBC	Avalanche Software	Midway	1999-11-16^{NA}	Unreleased	November 16, 1999	November 26, 1999
NCAA College Football 2K2: Road to the Rose Bowl	Visual Concepts; Avalanche Software	Sega	2001-08-28^{NA}	Unreleased	August 28, 2001	Unreleased
Neo Golden Logres	LittleWing	Success	2000-10-26^{JP}	October 26, 2000	Unreleased	Unreleased
Neppachi II @VPACHI	Falcon	Daikoku Denki	2000-07-06^{JP}	July 6, 2000	Unreleased	Unreleased
Neppachi III @VPACHI	Falcon	Daikoku Denki	2000-09-28^{JP}	September 28, 2000	Unreleased	Unreleased
Neppachi IV @VPACHI	Falcon	Daikoku Denki	2000-12-14^{JP}	December 14, 2000	Unreleased	Unreleased
Neppachi V @VPACHI	Falcon	Daikoku Denki	2000-12-14^{JP}	December 14, 2000	Unreleased	Unreleased
Neppachi VI @VPACHI	Falcon	Daikoku Denki	2001-02-15^{JP}	February 15, 2001	Unreleased	Unreleased
Neppachi: 10-ren Chan de Las Vegas Ryokou	Falcon	Daikoku Denki	1999-11-25^{JP}	November 25, 1999	Unreleased	Unreleased
Net Versus Chess	Yuki Enterprise	Atmark	2001-05-24^{JP}	May 24, 2001	Unreleased	Unreleased
Net Versus Gomoku Narabe to Renju	Yuki Enterprise	Atmark	2001-05-24^{JP}	May 24, 2001	Unreleased	Unreleased
Net Versus Hanafuda	Yuki Enterprise	Atmark	2001-05-24^{JP}	May 24, 2001	Unreleased	Unreleased
Net Versus Igo	Yuki Enterprise	Atmark	2001-05-24^{JP}	May 24, 2001	Unreleased	Unreleased
Net Versus Mahjong	Yuki Enterprise	Atmark	2001-05-24^{JP}	May 24, 2001	Unreleased	Unreleased
Net Versus Reversi	Yuki Enterprise	Atmark	2001-05-24^{JP}	May 24, 2001	Unreleased	Unreleased
Net Versus Shogi	Yuki Enterprise	Atmark	2001-05-24^{JP}	May 24, 2001	Unreleased	Unreleased
Net de Para	Fortyfive	Takuyo	2000-07-27^{JP}	July 27, 2000	Unreleased	Unreleased
Netto de Tennis	Capcom	Capcom	2000-10-09^{JP}	October 9, 2000	Unreleased	Unreleased
Nettou Golf	Data East	Sega	2000-10-19^{JP}	October 19, 2000	Unreleased	Unreleased
Never 7: The End of Infinity	KID	KID	2000-12-21^{JP}	December 21, 2000	Unreleased	Unreleased
The Next Tetris: On-line Edition; The Next Tetris^{PAL}	Blue Planet Software	Crave Entertainment	2000-12-19^{NA}	Unreleased	December 19, 2000	May 4, 2001
NFL 2K	Visual Concepts	Sega	1999-09-09^{NA}	January 20, 2000	September 9, 1999	Unreleased
NFL 2K1	Visual Concepts	Sega	2000-09-07^{NA}	March 29, 2001	September 7, 2000	Unreleased
NFL 2K2	Visual Concepts	Sega	2001-09-18^{NA}	March 28, 2002	September 18, 2001	Unreleased
NFL Blitz 2000	Avalanche Software	Midway	1999-09-09^{NA}	Unreleased	September 9, 1999	December 8, 1999
NFL Blitz 2001	Avalanche Software	Midway	2000-09-12^{NA}	Unreleased	September 12, 2000	Unreleased
NFL Quarterback Club 2000	Acclaim Studios Austin	Acclaim Sports	1999-11-29^{NA}	Unreleased	November 29, 1999	December 10, 1999
NFL QB Club 2001	High Voltage Software	Acclaim Sports	2000-08-24^{NA}	Unreleased	August 24, 2000	Unreleased
NHL 2K	Black Box Games	Sega	2000-02-09^{NA}	Unreleased	February 9, 2000	July 7, 2000
NHL 2K2	Treyarch	Sega	2002-02-12^{NA}	July 11, 2002	February 12, 2002	Unreleased
Nightmare Creatures II	Kalisto Entertainment	Konami	2000-06-08^{NA}	Unreleased	June 8, 2000	September 8, 2000
Nihon Pro Mahjong Renmei Kounin: Tetsuman Menkyokaiden	Naxat Soft	Naxat Soft	1999-11-18^{JP}	November 18, 1999	Unreleased	Unreleased
Nijuuei	KeroQ	PrincessSoft	2002-02-28^{JP}	February 28, 2002	Unreleased	Unreleased
Nishikaze no Kyoushikyouku: The Rhapsody of Zephyr	SoftMax	SoftMax	2001-02-22^{JP}	February 22, 2001	Unreleased	Unreleased
Nobunaga no Yabō: Reppūden	Koei	Koei	1999-12-16^{JP}	December 16, 1999	Unreleased	Unreleased
Nobunaga no Yabou: Shouseiroku with Power-Up Kit	Koei	Koei	1999-03-25^{JP}	March 25, 1999	Unreleased	Unreleased
Ogami Ichiro Funtouki: Sakura Taisen Kayou Show "Benitokage" Yori	Red Company	Sega	2000-02-24^{JP}	February 24, 2000	Unreleased	Unreleased
Omikron: The Nomad Soul; The Nomad Soul^{PAL}	Quantic Dream	Eidos Interactive	2000-06-22^{NA}	Unreleased	June 22, 2000	June 23, 2000^{EU} June 30, 2000^{AUS}
Omoide ni Kawaru Kimi: Memories Off	KID	KID	2002-11-28^{JP}	November 28, 2002	Unreleased	Unreleased
Ooga Booga	Visual Concepts	Sega	2001-09-11^{NA}	Unreleased	September 11, 2001	Unreleased
Orange Pocket: Cornet	Hooksoft	Pionesoft	2004-04-28^{JP}	April 28, 2004	Unreleased	Unreleased
Oukahouzin: Ouka Sakishi Toki	Entertainment Software Publishing; MediaWorks	Entertainment Software Publishing; MediaWorks	1999-12-16^{JP}	December 16, 1999	Unreleased	Unreleased
Outtrigger	Sega AM2	Sega	2001-07-24^{NA}	August 2, 2001	July 24, 2001	August 3, 2001
Pachi-Slot Teiou Dream Slot: Heiwa SP	Media Entertainment	Media Entertainment	2001-07-26^{JP}	July 26, 2001	Unreleased	Unreleased
Pachi-Slot Teiou Dream Slot: Olympia SP	Media Entertainment	Media Entertainment	2001-09-27^{JP}	September 27, 2001	Unreleased	Unreleased
Pachinko no Dendou: CR Nanashi	Microcabin	Microcabin	2001-10-04^{JP}	October 4, 2001	Unreleased	Unreleased
Pandora no Yume	Pajamas Soft	NEC Interchannel	2002-09-12^{JP}	September 12, 2002	Unreleased	Unreleased
Panzer Front	Shangri-La	ASCII Corporation	1999-12-22^{JP}	December 22, 1999	Unreleased	Unreleased
Patisserie na Nyanko: Hatsukoi wa Ichigo Aji	Pajamas Soft	Pionesoft	2004-09-22^{JP}	September 22, 2004	Unreleased	Unreleased
Pen Pen TriIcelon	Team Land Ho!; General Entertainment	General Entertainment^{JP} Infogrames North America^{NA} Infogrames Multimedia^{PAL}	1998-11-27^{JP}	November 27, 1998	September 9, 1999	October 14, 1999
Phantasy Star Online	Sonic Team	Sega	2000-12-21^{JP}	December 21, 2000	January 30, 2001	February 15, 2001
Phantasy Star Online Ver. 2	Sonic Team	Sega	2001-06-07^{JP}	June 7, 2001	September 25, 2001	March 1, 2002
Pia Carrot e Youkoso!! 2	Stack	NEC Interchannel	2003-02-06^{JP}	February 6, 2003	Unreleased	Unreleased
Pia Carrot e Youkoso!! 2.5	Stack	NEC Interchannel	2001-06-21^{JP}	June 21, 2001	Unreleased	Unreleased
Pia Carrot e Youkoso!! 3	F&C・FC02	NEC Interchannel	2003-03-27^{JP}	March 27, 2003	Unreleased	Unreleased
Pizzicato Polka: Ensa Genya	Pajamas Soft	KID	2004-06-17^{JP}	June 17, 2004	Unreleased	Unreleased
Plasma Sword: Nightmare of Bilstein	Capcom	Capcom^{JP/NA} Virgin Interactive Entertainment^{PAL}	1999-12-09^{JP}	December 9, 1999	April 10, 2000	August 25, 2000
Planet Ring	Sega	Sega	2000-12-04^{PAL}	Unreleased	Unreleased	December 4, 2000
Plus Plumb	Takuyo	Takuyo	1999-10-07^{JP}	October 7, 1999	Unreleased	Unreleased
Pocke-Kano: Yumi-Shizuka-Fumio	Success	Datam Polystar	2000-06-08^{NA}	June 8, 2000	Unreleased	Unreleased
POD: Speedzone; POD 2^{PAL}	Ubi Soft Bucharest	Ubi Soft	2000-12-06^{NA}	Unreleased	December 6, 2000	December 14, 2000
Pop'n Music	Konami	Konami	1999-02-25^{JP}	February 25, 1999	Unreleased	Unreleased
Pop 'n Music 2	Konami	Konami	1999-09-14^{JP}	September 14, 1999	Unreleased	Unreleased
Pop 'n Music 3 Append Disc	Konami	Konami	2000-02-10^{JP}	February 10, 2000	Unreleased	Unreleased
Pop 'n Music 4 Append Disc	Konami	Konami	2000-10-12^{JP}	October 12, 2000	Unreleased	Unreleased
Power Stone	Capcom	Capcom^{JP/NA} Eidos Interactive^{PAL}	1999-02-25^{JP}	February 25, 1999	September 9, 1999	October 14, 1999
Power Stone 2	Capcom	Capcom^{JP/NA} Eidos Interactive^{PAL}	2000-04-27^{JP}	April 27, 2000	August 23, 2000	August 24, 2000
Prince of Persia: Arabian Nights	Avalanche Software	Mattel Interactive	2000-12-04^{NA}	Unreleased	December 4, 2000	Unreleased
Princess Holiday: Korogaru Ringotei Senya Ichiya	August	Alchemist	2003-05-29^{JP}	May 29, 2003	Unreleased	Unreleased
Princess Maker Collection	Ninelives	GeneX	2001-07-19^{JP}	July 19, 2001	Unreleased	Unreleased
Prism Heart	KID	KID	2001-11-29^{JP}	November 29, 2001	Unreleased	Unreleased
Prismaticallization	Arc System Works	Arc System Works	2000-08-24^{JP}	August 24, 2000	Unreleased	Unreleased
Project Justice; Project Justice: Rival Schools 2^{PAL}	Capcom	Capcom^{JP/NA} Virgin Interactive Entertainment^{PAL}	2000-12-07^{JP}	December 7, 2000	May 16, 2001	April 13, 2001
Pro Mahjong Kiwame D	Athena	Athena	2000-03-30^{JP}	March 30, 2000	Unreleased	Unreleased
Pro Pinball Trilogy	Cunning Developments	Empire Interactive	2001-05-18^{PAL}	Unreleased	Unreleased	May 18, 2001
Pro Yakyū Team de Asobou!	Sega R&D6	Sega	1999-12-23^{JP}	December 23, 1999	Unreleased	Unreleased
Pro Yakyū Team de Asobou Net!	Smilebit	Sega	2000-08-10^{JP}	August 10, 2000	Unreleased	Unreleased
Pro Yakyū Team o Tsukurou!	Sega R&D6	Sega	1999-08-05^{JP}	August 5, 1999	Unreleased	Unreleased
Psychic Force 2012	Taito	Taito	1999-03-04^{JP}	March 4, 1999	November 9, 1999	September 4, 2000
Psyvariar 2: The Will to Fabricate	SKONEC	Success	2004-02-26^{JP}	February 26, 2004	Unreleased	Unreleased
Puyo Puyo Da! Featuring Ellena System	Compile	Compile	1999-12-16^{JP}	December 16, 1999	Unreleased	Unreleased
Puyo Puyo Fever	Sonic Team	Sega	2004-02-24^{JP}	February 24, 2004	Unreleased	Unreleased
Puyo Puyo~n	Compile	Sega	1999-03-04^{JP}	March 4, 1999	Unreleased	Unreleased
Q*bert	Pipe Dream Interactive	Hasbro Interactive	2000-12-05^{NA}	Unreleased	December 5, 2000	Unreleased
Quake III Arena	Raster Productions	Sega	2000-10-19^{NA}	Unreleased	October 19, 2000	December 8, 2000
Quiz Aa! Megami-sama: Tatakau Tsubasa to Tomoni	Wow Entertainment	Sega	2000-11-30^{JP}	November 30, 2000	Unreleased	Unreleased
Racing Simulation 2: Monaco Grand Prix Online	Ubi Soft Paris	Ubi Soft	2001-11-23^{PAL}	Unreleased	Unreleased	November 23, 2001
Radirgy	MileStone Inc.	MileStone Inc.	2006-02-16^{JP}	February 16, 2006	Unreleased	Unreleased
Railroad Tycoon II: Gold Edition; Railroad Tycoon II^{PAL}	Tremor Entertainment	Gathering of Developers	2000-07-31^{NA}	Unreleased	July 31, 2000	November 10, 2000
Rainbow Cotton	Success	Success	2000-01-20^{JP}	January 20, 2000	Unreleased	Unreleased
Rayman 2: The Great Escape	Ubi Pictures	Ubi Soft	2000-03-21^{NA}	March 23, 2000	March 21, 2000	July 26, 2000
Razor Freestyle Scooter; Freestyle Scooter^{PAL}	Titanium Studios	Crave Entertainment^{NA} Ubi Soft^{PAL}	2001-08-08^{NA}	Unreleased	August 8, 2001	April 26, 2002
Renai Chu! Happy Perfect	Fupac	GN Software	2003-11-27^{JP}	November 27, 2003	Unreleased	Unreleased
Rent-A-Hero No. 1	Aspect	Sega	2000-05-25^{JP}	May 25, 2000	Unreleased	Unreleased
Revive...: Sosei	Data East; Sakata SAS	Data East	1999-10-28^{JP}	October 28, 1999	Unreleased	Unreleased
Re-Volt	Acclaim Studios London	Acclaim Entertainment	1999-12-17^{NA}	July 13, 2000	December 17, 1999	August 2, 2000
Ready 2 Rumble Boxing	Midway Studios San Diego	Midway	1999-09-09^{NA}	January 13, 2000	September 9, 1999	October 14, 1999
Ready 2 Rumble Boxing: Round 2	Midway Studios San Diego	Midway	2000-10-24^{NA}	Unreleased	October 24, 2000	November 10, 2000
Real Sound: Kaze no Regret	Warp	Warp	1999-03-11^{JP}	March 11, 1999	Unreleased	Unreleased
Record of Lodoss War: Advent of Cardice	Neverland	Kadokawa Shoten / Entertainment Software Publishing^{JP} Swing! Entertainment Media AG^{PAL} Conspiracy Entertainment^{NA}	2000-06-29^{JP}	June 29, 2000	March 14, 2001	December 15, 2000
Red Dog: Superior Firepower	Argonaut Games	Sega^{PAL} Crave Entertainment^{NA}	2000-04-21^{PAL}	Unreleased	October 31, 2000	April 21, 2000
Reel Fishing: Wild	Westone Bit Entertainment	Victor Interactive Software^{JP} Natsume Inc.^{NA}	2001-02-22^{JP}	February 22, 2001	July 24, 2001	Unreleased
Resident Evil 2	Capcom	Capcom^{JP/NA} Virgin Interactive Entertainment^{PAL}	1999-12-22^{JP}	December 22, 1999	December 13, 2000	April 28, 2000
Resident Evil 3: Nemesis	Capcom	Capcom^{JP/NA} Virgin Interactive Entertainment^{PAL}	2000-11-15^{NA}	November 16, 2000	November 15, 2000	December 22, 2000
Resident Evil – Code: Veronica	Capcom Production Studio 4	Capcom^{JP/NA} Eidos Interactive^{PAL}	2000-02-03^{JP}	February 3, 2000	March 28, 2000	May 26, 2000
Rez	United Game Artists	Sega	2001-11-22^{JP}	November 22, 2001	Unreleased	January 11, 2002
The Ring: Terror's Realm	Asmik Ace Entertainment	Asmik Ace Entertainment^{JP} Infogrames North America^{NA}	2000-02-24^{JP}	February 24, 2000	September 26, 2000	Unreleased
Rippin' Riders Snowboarding; Cool Boarders Burrrn!^{JP} Snow Surfers^{PAL}	UEP Systems	UEP Systems^{JP} Sega^{WW}	1999-08-26^{JP}	August 26, 1999	November 10, 1999	November 12, 1999
Roadsters	Player 1	Titus Interactive	2000-03-20^{NA}	Unreleased	March 20, 2000	July 7, 2000
Roommania #203	Sega	Sega	2000-01-27^{JP}	January 27, 2000	Unreleased	Unreleased
Roommate Asami: Okusama ha Joshikousei - Director's Edition	Fupac	Datam Polystar	2002-11-21^{JP}	November 21, 2002	Unreleased	Unreleased
Roommate Novel: Sato Yuka	Fupac	Datam Polystar	2000-06-29^{JP}	June 29, 2000	Unreleased	Unreleased
Run=Dim as Black Soul	Yuki Enterprise	Idea Factory	2001-09-06^{JP}	September 6, 2001	Unreleased	Unreleased
Rune Caster	Noisia	Vision	2000-08-24^{JP}	August 24, 2000	Unreleased	Unreleased
Rune Jade	Hudson Soft	Hudson Soft	2000-08-24^{JP}	August 24, 2000	Unreleased	Unreleased
Ryōko Inoue: Last Scene	Datam Polystar	Datam Polystar	2001-11-08^{JP}	November 8, 2001	Unreleased	Unreleased
Ryōko Inoue: Roommate	Fupac	Datam Polystar	2001-07-05^{JP}	July 5, 2001	Unreleased	Unreleased
Saka Tsuku Tokudaigou: J.League Pro Soccer Club o Tsukurou!	Smilebit	Sega	2000-12-21^{JP}	December 21, 2000	Unreleased	Unreleased
Saka Tsuku Tokudaigou 2: J.League Pro Soccer Club o Tsukurou!	Smilebit	Sega	2001-12-13^{JP}	December 13, 2001	Unreleased	Unreleased
Sakura Momoko Gekijō Coji-Coji	Psy-Gong	Marvelous Entertainment	2000-04-20^{JP}	April 20, 2000	Unreleased	Unreleased
Sakura Taisen	Sega CS2 R&D; Red Company; M2	Sega	2000-05-25^{JP}	May 25, 2000	Unreleased	Unreleased
Sakura Taisen 2: Kimi, Shinitamō Koto Nakare	Sega CS2 R&D; Red Company; Overworks	Sega	2000-09-21^{JP}	September 21, 2000	Unreleased	Unreleased
Sakura Taisen 3: Paris wa Moeteiru ka	Red Company; Overworks	Sega	2001-03-22^{JP}	March 22, 2001	Unreleased	Unreleased
Sakura Taisen 4: Koi Seyo, Otome	Red Company; Overworks	Sega	2002-03-21^{JP}	March 21, 2002	Unreleased	Unreleased
Sakura Taisen Online: Paris no Nagai Hibi	Overworks	Sega	2001-12-20^{JP}	December 20, 2001	Unreleased	Unreleased
Sakura Taisen Online: Teito no Yuugana Hibi	Overworks	Sega	2001-12-20^{JP}	December 20, 2001	Unreleased	Unreleased
Samba de Amigo	Sonic Team	Sega	2000-04-27^{JP}	April 27, 2000	October 17, 2000	December 8, 2000
Samba de Amigo Ver. 2000	Sonic Team	Sega	2000-12-14^{JP}	December 14, 2000	Unreleased	Unreleased
San Francisco Rush 2049; Rush 2049^{PAL}	Midway Games West	Midway	2000-09-06^{NA}	Unreleased	September 6, 2000	September 29, 2000
Sangokushi VI	Koei	Koei	1999-03-25^{JP}	March 25, 1999	Unreleased	Unreleased
Sangokushi VI with Power-Up Kit	Koei	Koei	2000-04-06^{JP}	April 6, 2000	Unreleased	Unreleased
Seaman	Vivarium; Jellyvision	Sega	1999-07-29^{JP}	July 29, 1999	August 8, 2000	Unreleased
Seaman: Kindan no Pet: 2001 Nen Taiouban	Vivarium	Vivarium	2001-08-10^{NA}	August 10, 2001	Unreleased	Unreleased
Sega Bass Fishing	SIMS	Sega	1999-04-01^{JP}	April 1, 1999	October 6, 1999	October 14, 1999
Sega Bass Fishing 2	Wow Entertainment	Sega	2001-08-21^{NA}	August 30, 2001	August 21, 2001	Unreleased
Sega Extreme Sports; Xtreme Sports^{NA}	Innerloop Studios	Sega^{JP/PAL} Infogrames^{NA}	2000-10-27^{PAL}	September 6, 2001	November 28, 2000	October 27, 2000
Sega GT	Wow Entertainment; TOSE	Sega	2000-02-17^{JP}	February 17, 2000	August 29, 2000	December 1, 2000
Segagaga	Hitmaker	Sega	2001-03-29^{JP}	March 29, 2001	Unreleased	Unreleased
Sega Marine Fishing	Wow Entertainment	Sega	2000-10-16^{NA}	October 19, 2000	October 16, 2000	Unreleased
Sega Rally Championship 2	Sega AM Annex; Smilebit	Sega	1999-01-28^{JP}	January 28, 1999	November 30, 1999	October 14, 1999
Sega Smash Pack Vol. 1	Sega	Sega	2001-01-30^{NA}	Unreleased	January 30, 2001	Unreleased
Sega Swirl	Tremor Entertainment	Sega	2000-02-02^{NA}	2000	February 2, 2000	2000
Sega Tetris	Wow Entertainment	Sega	2000-11-23^{JP}	November 23, 2000	Unreleased	Unreleased
Sega Worldwide Soccer 2000	Silicon Dreams Studio	Sega	1999-12-01^{PAL}	Unreleased	Unreleased	December 1, 1999
Sega Worldwide Soccer 2000 Euro Edition	Silicon Dreams Studio	Sega	2000-05-26^{PAL}	Unreleased	Unreleased	May 26, 2000
Seireiki Rayblade	Winkysoft	Winkysoft	2000-09-28^{JP}	September 28, 2000	Unreleased	Unreleased
Sekai Fushigi Hakken! Troy	Hitachi Media Force	TBS	1999-07-22^{JP}	July 22, 1999	Unreleased	Unreleased
Sengoku Turb	NEC Home Electronics; qnep	NEC Home Electronics	1999-01-14^{JP}	January 14, 1999	Unreleased	Unreleased
Sengoku Turb: Fanfan I love me Dunce-doublentendre	NEC Home Electronics; qnep	NEC Home Electronics	1999-12-23^{JP}	December 23, 1999	Unreleased	Unreleased
Sentimental Graffiti 2	NEC Interchannel	NEC Interchannel	2000-07-27^{JP}	July 27, 2000	Unreleased	Unreleased
Sentimental Graffiti: Yakusoku	NEC Interchannel	NEC Interchannel	2003-12-25^{JP}	December 25, 2003	Unreleased	Unreleased
Seventh Cross: Evolution	HuneX	NEC Home Electronics^{JP} UFO Interactive Games^{NA}	1998-12-23^{JP}	December 23, 1998	January 15, 2000	Unreleased
Shadow Man	Acclaim Studios Teesside	Acclaim Entertainment	1999-12-01^{NA}	Unreleased	December 1, 1999	January 21, 2000
Shanghai Dynasty	Success	Success	2000-03-16^{JP}	March 16, 2000	Unreleased	Unreleased
Shenmue	Sega AM2	Sega	1999-12-29^{JP}	December 29, 1999	November 7, 2000	December 1, 2000
Shenmue II	Sega AM2	Sega	2001-09-06^{JP}	September 6, 2001	Unreleased	November 23, 2001
Shikigami no Shiro II	Alfa System	Alfa System	2004-03-25^{JP}	March 25, 2004	Unreleased	Unreleased
Shin Honkaku Hanafuda	Altron	Altron	1999-07-22^{JP}	July 22, 1999	Unreleased	Unreleased
The Shinri Game	Visit	Visit	2001-02-01^{JP}	February 1, 2001	Unreleased	Unreleased
Shinseiki Evangelion: Ayanami Rei Ikusei Keikaku	Gainax; Broccoli	Broccoli	2002-04-18^{JP}	April 18, 2002	Unreleased	Unreleased
Shinseiki Evangelion: Typing E-Keikaku	Gainax	Gainax	2001-04-19^{JP}	April 19, 2001	Unreleased	Unreleased
Shinseiki Evangelion: Typing Hokan Keikaku	Gainax	Gainax	2001-08-30^{JP}	August 30, 2001	Unreleased	Unreleased
Shin Nihon Pro Wrestling Toukon Retsuden 4	Yuke's	Tomy	1999-09-02^{JP}	September 2, 1999	Unreleased	Unreleased
Shirotsume Souwa -Episode of the Clovers	Littlewitch	NEC Interchannel	2003-06-26^{JP}	June 26, 2003	Unreleased	Unreleased
Silent Scope	Konami	Konami	2000-10-12^{JP}	October 12, 2000	October 23, 2000	November 17, 2000
Silver	Spiral House	Infogrames	2000-06-28^{NA}	Unreleased	June 28, 2000	June 30, 2000
Simple 2000 Series DC Vol.01: Bitter Sweet Fools: The Renai Adventure	HuneX	D3 Publisher	2002-08-29^{JP}	August 29, 2002	Unreleased	Unreleased
Simple 2000 Series DC Vol.02: Natsuiro Celebration: The Renai Simulation	HuneX	D3 Publisher	2002-09-26^{JP}	September 26, 2002	Unreleased	Unreleased
Simple 2000 Series DC Vol.03: Fureai: The Renai Simulation	HuneX	D3 Publisher	2002-09-26^{JP}	September 26, 2002	Unreleased	Unreleased
Simple 2000 Series DC Vol.04: Okaeritsu!: The Renai Adventure	HuneX	D3 Publisher	2002-09-26^{JP}	September 26, 2002	Unreleased	Unreleased
Sister Princess Premium Edition	Stack	MediaWorks	2002-03-28^{JP}	March 28, 2002	Unreleased	Unreleased
Skies of Arcadia	Overworks	Sega	2000-10-05^{JP}	October 5, 2000	November 13, 2000	April 27, 2001
Slave Zero	Infogrames North America	Inforgrames North America^{NA} Infogrames Multimedia^{PAL}	1999-11-17^{NA}	Unreleased	November 17, 1999	March 24, 2000
Sno-Cross Championship Racing	Unique Development Studios	Crave Entertainment^{NA} Ubi Soft^{PAL}	2000-11-29^{NA}	Unreleased	November 29, 2000	January 19, 2001
Snow	Studio Mebius	NEC Interchannel	2003-09-25^{JP}	September 25, 2003	Unreleased	Unreleased
Soldier of Fortune	Runecraft	Crave Entertainment	2001-07-26^{NA}	Unreleased	July 26, 2001	August 17, 2001
Sonic Adventure	Sonic Team	Sega	1998-12-23^{JP}	December 23, 1998	September 9, 1999	October 14, 1999
Sonic Adventure 2	Sonic Team USA	Sega	2001-06-19^{NA}	June 23, 2001	June 19, 2001	June 23, 2001
Sonic Shuffle	Sega; Hudson Soft	Sega	2000-11-14^{NA}	December 21, 2000	November 14, 2000	March 9, 2001
Sorcerian: Shichisei Mahou no Shito	Exe-Create; Media JuGGLer	Victor Interactive Software	2000-04-27^{JP}	April 27, 2000	Unreleased	Unreleased
Soukou no Kihei: Space Griffon	Panther Software	Panther Software	1999-11-03^{JP}	November 3, 1999	Unreleased	Unreleased
Soulcalibur	Namco	Namco	1999-08-05^{JP}	August 5, 1999	September 9, 1999	November 26, 1999
Soul Fighter	Toka	Red Orb Entertainment^{NA} Mindscape^{PAL}	1999-11-23^{NA}	Unreleased	November 23, 1999	December 10, 1999
South Park: Chef's Luv Shack	Acclaim Studios Austin	Acclaim Entertainment	1999-11-18^{NA}	Unreleased	November 22, 1999	November 26, 1999
South Park Rally	Tantalus Interactive	Acclaim Entertainment	2000-07-07^{NA}	Unreleased	July 7, 2000	July 28, 2000
Space Channel 5	Sega AM9	Sega	1999-12-16^{JP}	December 16, 1999	June 6, 2000	October 6, 2000
Space Channel 5: Part 2	United Game Artists	Sega	2002-02-14^{JP}	February 14, 2002	Unreleased	Unreleased
Spawn: In the Demon's Hand	Capcom	Capcom^{JP/NA} Eidos Interactive^{PAL}	2000-08-10^{JP}	August 10, 2000	October 18, 2000	January 19, 2001
Spec Ops II: Omega Squad	Runecraft	Ripcord Games	2000-10-25^{NA}	Unreleased	October 25, 2000	August 10, 2001
Speed Devils	Ubi Soft Montreal	Ubi Soft	1999-10-14^{PAL}	November 18, 1999	October 29, 1999	October 14, 1999
Speed Devils: Online Racing	Ubi Soft Montreal	Ubi Soft	2000-12-13^{NA}	Unreleased	December 13, 2000	February 2, 2001
Spider-Man	Treyarch	Activision	2001-05-01^{NA}	Unreleased	May 1, 2001	June 1, 2001
Spirit of Speed 1937	Broadsword Interactive	LJN^{WW} Acclaim Entertainment / Taito^{JP}	2000-06-09^{PAL}	April 5, 2001	June 27, 2000	June 9, 2000^{EU} July 28, 2000^{AUS}
Sports Jam	Wow Entertainment	Sega^{JP} Agetec^{NA}	2001-04-12^{JP}	April 12, 2001	July 2001	Unreleased
Star Wars: Demolition	Luxoflux	LucasArts	2000-11-20^{NA}	Unreleased	November 20, 2000	December 15, 2000
Star Wars Episode I: Jedi Power Battles	LucasArts	LucasArts	2000-10-04^{NA}	Unreleased	October 10, 2000	October 20, 2000
Star Wars Episode I: Racer	LucasArts	LucasArts	2000-04-03^{NA}	Unreleased	April 3, 2000	July 28, 2000
Starlancer	Warthog Games; Digital Anvil	Crave Entertainment^{NA} Ubi Soft^{PAL}	2000-12-06^{NA}	Unreleased	December 6, 2000	March 23, 2001
Street Fighter Alpha 3	Capcom	Capcom^{JP/NA} Virgin Interactive Entertainment^{PAL}	1999-07-08^{JP}	July 8, 1999	May 7, 2000	October 24, 2000^{AUS} September 29, 2000^{EU}
Street Fighter III: 3rd Strike	Capcom	Capcom^{JP/NA} Virgin Interactive Entertainment^{PAL}	2000-06-29^{JP}	June 29, 2000	October 4, 2000	December 15, 2000
Street Fighter III: Double Impact	Capcom	Capcom^{JP/NA} Virgin Interactive Entertainment^{PAL}	1999-12-16^{JP}	December 16, 1999	June 21, 2000	September 15, 2000
Street Fighter Zero 3: Saikyō-ryū Dōjō for Matching Service	Capcom	Capcom	2001-02-15^{JP}	February 15, 2001	Unreleased	Unreleased
Stunt GP	Team17	Eon Digital Entertainment	2001-06-08^{PAL}	Unreleased	Unreleased	June 8, 2001
Stupid Invaders	Titanium Studios	Ubi Soft	2001-05-18^{PAL}	Unreleased	June 20, 2001	May 18, 2001
Suigetsu: Mayoigokoro	F&C・FC02	KID	2004-10-28^{JP}	October 28, 2004	Unreleased	Unreleased
Suika	Circus	PrincessSoft	2002-07-18^{JP}	July 18, 2002	Unreleased	Unreleased
Sunrise Eiyuutan	Atelier-Sai	Sunrise Interactive	1999-12-02^{JP}	December 2, 1999	Unreleased	Unreleased
Super Magnetic Neo	Genki	Genki^{JP} Crave Entertainment^{WW}	2000-02-03^{JP}	February 3, 2000	June 15, 2000	August 4, 2000
Super Producers: Mezase Show Biz Kai	Hudson Soft	Hudson Soft	1999-11-11^{JP}	November 11, 1999	Unreleased	Unreleased
Super Puzzle Fighter II X for Matching Service	Capcom	Capcom	2001-07-05^{JP}	July 5, 2001	Unreleased	Unreleased
Super Robot Taisen Alpha for Dreamcast	Banpresto	Banpresto	2001-08-30^{JP}	August 30, 2001	Unreleased	Unreleased
Super Runabout	Climax Entertainment	Climax Entertainment	2000-05-25^{JP}	May 25, 2000	Unreleased	Unreleased
Super Runabout: San Francisco Edition	Climax Entertainment	Interplay Entertainment^{NA} Virgin Interactive Entertainment^{PAL} Climax Entertainment^{JP}	2000-10-24^{NA}	June 21, 2001	October 24, 2000	November 24, 2000
Super Street Fighter II X for Matching Service	Capcom	Capcom	2000-12-22^{JP}	December 22, 2000	Unreleased	Unreleased
Surf Rocket Racers	CRI	Crave Entertainment^{WW} CRI^{JP}	2000-12-15^{PAL}	March 22, 2001	February 28, 2001	December 15, 2000
Suzuki Alstare Extreme Racing; Redline Racer^{JP}	Criterion Games	Imagineer^{JP} Ubi Soft^{WW}	1999-04-29^{JP}	April 29, 1999	November 11, 1999	November 26, 1999
Sweet Season	Takuyo	Takuyo	2003-10-23^{JP}	October 23, 2003	Unreleased	Unreleased
Sword of the Berserk: Guts' Rage	Yuke's	ASCII Corporation^{JP} Eidos Interactive^{WW}	1999-12-16^{JP}	December 16, 1999	March 16, 2000	May 19, 2000
Sydney 2000	Attention to Detail	Eidos Interactive^{WW} Capcom^{JP}	2000-08-28^{NA}	October 26, 2000	August 28, 2000	September 4, 2000
Taisen Net Gimmick: Capcom & Psikyo All Stars	Psikyo	Capcom	2001-06-28^{JP}	June 28, 2001	Unreleased	Unreleased
Tako no Marine	Microcabin	Microcabin	2002-05-16^{JP}	May 16, 2002	Unreleased	Unreleased
Tamakyuu	Tsuki Boshi Gumi	NEC Interchannel	2004-01-29^{JP}	January 29, 2004	Unreleased	Unreleased
Tanaka Torahiko no Uru Toraryuu Shogi: Ibisha Anaguma-hen	Arc System Works	Arc System Works	1999-11-11^{JP}	November 11, 1999	Unreleased	Unreleased
Tantei Shinshi Dash!	Abel	Abel	2000-12-21^{NA}	December 21, 2000	Unreleased	Unreleased
Taxi 2	Blue Sphere Games	Ubi Soft	2000-11-30^{PAL}	Unreleased	Unreleased	November 30, 2000
Tech Romancer	Capcom	Capcom^{JP/NA} Virgin Interactive Entertainment^{PAL}	2000-01-13^{JP}	January 13, 2000	June 15, 2000	July 7, 2000
Tech Romancer for Matching Service	Capcom	Capcom	2001-01-18^{JP}	January 18, 2001	Unreleased	Unreleased
Tee Off; Golf Shiyō Yo^{JP}	Bottom Up	Bottom Up^{JP} Acclaim Entertainment^{WW}	1999-12-09^{JP}	December 9, 1999	January 12, 2000	January 12, 2000
Tenohira wo, Taiyou ni	Clear	PrincessSoft	2004-03-25^{JP}	March 25, 2004	Unreleased	Unreleased
Tentama: 1st Sunny Side	KID	KID	2001-10-25^{JP}	October 25, 2001	Unreleased	Unreleased
Tetris 4D	Bullet-Proof Software	Bullet-Proof Software	1998-12-23^{JP}	December 23, 1998	Unreleased	Unreleased
Test Drive 6	Pitbull Syndicate	Infogrames North America	1999-12-21^{NA}	Unreleased	December 21, 1999	Unreleased
Test Drive Le Mans; Le Mans 24 Hours^{JP/PAL}	Infogrames Melbourne House	Infogrames	2000-11-08^{NA}	March 15, 2001	November 8, 2000	November 17, 2000
Time Stalkers	Climax Entertainment	Sega	1999-09-15^{JP}	September 15, 1999	March 28, 2000	November 10, 2000
TNN Motorsports HardCore Heat; Buggy Heat^{JP/PAL}	CRI	CRI^{JP} ASC Games^{NA} Sega^{PAL}	1999-07-08^{JP}	July 8, 1999	September 9, 1999	October 22, 1999
Tokyo Xtreme Racer; Shutokō Battle^{JP} Tokyo Highway Challenge^{PAL}	Genki	Genki^{JP} Crave Entertainment^{WW}	1999-06-24^{JP}	June 24, 1999	September 9, 1999	October 14, 1999
Tokyo Xtreme Racer 2 Shutokō Battle 2^{JP} Tokyo Highway Challenge 2^{PAL}	Genki	Genki^{JP} Crave Entertainment^{NA} Ubi Soft^{PAL}	2000-06-22^{JP}	June 22, 2000	September 26, 2000	December 15, 2000
Tokusatsu Bouken Katsugeki Super Hero Retsuden	ALU; Adventure Planning Service	Banpresto	2000-07-27^{JP}	July 27, 2000	Unreleased	Unreleased
Tokyo Bus Guide	Fortyfive	Fortyfive	1999-12-23^{JP}	December 23, 1999	Unreleased	Unreleased
Tokyo Bus Guide with Bijin Bus Guide Tenjou Pack	Fortyfive	Fortyfive	2000-12-21^{JP}	December 21, 2000	Unreleased	Unreleased
Tom Clancy's Rainbow Six	Pipe Dream Interactive	Majesco	2000-05-03^{NA}	Unreleased	May 3, 2000	February 2, 2001
Tom Clancy's Rainbow Six: Rogue Spear	Pipe Dream Interactive	Majesco	2000-11-20^{NA}	Unreleased	November 20, 2000	May 4, 2001
Tomb Raider: Chronicles	Core Design	Eidos Interactive	2000-11-26^{NA}	Unreleased	November 26, 2000	December 15, 2000
Tomb Raider: The Last Revelation	Core Design	Eidos Interactive^{WW} Capcom^{JP}	2000-03-24^{PAL}	July 19, 2000	March 25, 2000	March 24, 2000
Tony Hawk's Pro Skater; Tony Hawk's Skateboarding^{PAL}	Treyarch	Crave Entertainment	2000-05-24^{NA}	Unreleased	May 24, 2000	June 29, 2000
Tony Hawk's Pro Skater 2	Treyarch	Activision	2000-11-07^{NA}	Unreleased	November 7, 2000	December 15, 2000
Toy Commander	No Cliche	Sega	1999-10-14^{PAL}	January 6, 2000	November 2, 1999	October 14, 1999
Toy Racer	No Cliche	Sega	2000-12-22^{PAL}	Unreleased	Unreleased	December 22, 2000
Toy Story 2: Buzz Lightyear to the Rescue!	Traveller's Tales	Activision	2000-07-05^{NA}	Unreleased	July 5, 2000	November 17, 2000
Treasure Strike	KID; h.a.n.d.	KID	2000-02-17^{JP}	February 17, 2000	Unreleased	Unreleased
TrickStyle	Criterion Games	Acclaim Entertainment	1999-09-09^{NA}	Unreleased	September 9, 1999	October 14, 1999
Tricolore Crise	HuneX	Victor Interactive Software	2000-11-09^{JP}	November 9, 2000	Unreleased	Unreleased
Triggerheart Exelica	Warashi	Warashi	2007-02-22^{JP}	February 22, 2007	Unreleased	Unreleased
Trizeal	Triangle Service	Triangle Service	2005-04-07^{JP}	April 7, 2005	Unreleased	Unreleased
Tsukiha Higashini Hiha Nishini: Operation Sanctuary	August	Alchemist	2004-06-24^{JP}	June 24, 2004	Unreleased	Unreleased
Tsuushin Taisen Logic Battle Daisessen	Fortyfive	Fortyfive	2000-05-11^{JP}	May 11, 2000	Unreleased	Unreleased
Twinkle Star Sprites	ADK	SNK	2000-03-23^{JP}	March 23, 2000	Unreleased	Unreleased
Typing of the Date	Hudson Soft	Hudson Soft	2001-09-27^{NA}	September 27, 2001	Unreleased	Unreleased
The Typing of the Dead	Wow Entertainment; Smilebit	Sega	2000-03-30^{JP}	March 30, 2000	January 23, 2001	Unreleased
UEFA Dream Soccer	Silicon Dreams Studio	Sega	2000-12-08^{PAL}	Unreleased	Unreleased	December 8, 2000
UEFA Striker; Super Euro Soccer 2000^{JP} Striker Pro 2000^{NA}	Rage Software	Infogrames^{WW} Imagineer^{JP}	1999-10-22^{PAL}	April 6, 2000	May 15, 2000	October 22, 1999
Ultimate Fighting Championship	Anchor Inc.	Crave Entertainment^{NA} Ubi Soft^{PAL} Capcom^{JP}	2000-08-30^{NA}	January 25, 2001	August 30, 2000	December 8, 2000
Undercover AD2025 Kei	Pulse Interactive	Pulse Interactive	2000-01-27^{JP}	January 27, 2000	Unreleased	Unreleased
Under Defeat	G.rev	G.rev	2006-03-23^{JP}	March 23, 2006	Unreleased	Unreleased
Unreal Tournament	Secret Level	Infogrames	2001-03-13^{NA}	Unreleased	March 13, 2001	June 29, 2001
Urban Chaos	Mucky Foot Productions	Eidos Interactive	2000-10-06^{PAL}	Unreleased	November 13, 2000	October 6, 2000
Utau: Tumbling Dice	EMU	Reindeer	2004-06-24^{JP}	June 24, 2004	Unreleased	Unreleased
V-Rally 2 Test Drive V-Rally^{NA}	Eden Studios	Infogrames	2000-05-26^{PAL}	Unreleased	October 18, 2000	May 26, 2000
Vampire Chronicle for Matching Service	Capcom	Capcom	2000-08-10^{JP}	August 10, 2000	Unreleased	Unreleased
Vanishing Point	Clockwork Games	Acclaim Entertainment	2001-01-03^{NA}	Unreleased	January 3, 2001	January 19, 2001
Vermilion Desert	Riverhillsoft	Riverhillsoft	1999-12-02^{JP}	December 2, 1999	Unreleased	Unreleased
Vigilante 8: 2nd Offense	Luxoflux	Activision^{WW} Syscom Entertainment^{JP}	1999-12-22^{NA}	March 23, 2000	December 22, 1999	February 18, 2000
Virtua Athlete 2K; Virtua Athlete 2000^{NA}	Hitmaker	Sega^{JP/PAL} Agetec^{NA}	2000-07-27^{JP}	July 27, 2000	September 12, 2000	August 25, 2000
Virtua Cop 2	Sega AM2	Sega	2000-03-02^{JP}	March 2, 2000	Unreleased	Unreleased
Virtua Fighter 3tb	Sega AM2; Genki	Sega	1998-11-27^{JP}	November 27, 1998	October 18, 1999	October 14, 1999
Virtua Striker 2 Virtua Striker 2 ver. 2000.1^{JP/PAL}	Sega; Genki	Sega	1999-12-02^{JP}	December 2, 1999	March 14, 2000	February 29, 2000
Virtua Tennis; Power Smash^{JP}	Hitmaker	Sega	2000-07-11^{NA}	November 23, 2000	July 11, 2000	September 8, 2000
Virtua Tennis 2 Tennis 2K2^{NA} Power Smash 2^{JP}	Hitmaker	Sega	2001-10-23^{NA}	November 15, 2001	October 23, 2001	November 23, 2001
Wacky Races	Infogrames Sheffield House	Infogrames	2000-06-27^{NA}	Unreleased	June 27, 2000	June 30, 2000
Walt Disney World Quest: Magical Racing Tour	Prolific Publishing	Eidos Interactive	2000-07-19^{NA}	Unreleased	July 19, 2000	September 1, 2000
Weakness Hero Torauman DC	NEC Interchannel	Fortyfive	2002-02-28^{JP}	February 28, 2002	Unreleased	Unreleased
Web Mystery: Yochimu Wo Miru Neko	Studio Mebius	Studio Mebius	1999-04-22^{JP}	April 22, 1999	Unreleased	Unreleased
Wetrix+	Zed Two	Acclaim Entertainment^{NA} Take-Two Interactive^{PAL}	1999-12-16^{NA}	Unreleased	December 16, 1999	March 31, 2000
Who Wants to Be a Millionaire?	Hothouse Creations	Eidos Interactive	2000-09-29^{PAL}	Unreleased	Unreleased	September 29, 2000
Who Wants to Beat Up a Millionaire	Hypnotix	Simon & Schuster Interactive	2000-10^{NA}	Unreleased	October 2000	Unreleased
Wild Metal	DMA Design	Rockstar Games	2000-02-01^{NA/PAL}	Unreleased	February 1, 2000	February 1, 2000
Wind: A Breath of Heart	HuneX	Alchemist	2003-01-30^{JP}	January 30, 2003	Unreleased	Unreleased
Winning Post 4 Program 2000	Koei	Koei	2000-03-30^{JP}	March 30, 2000	Unreleased	Unreleased
World Neverland Plus: Orurudo Oukoku Monogatari	Riverhillsoft	Riverhillsoft	1999-07-15^{JP}	July 15, 1999	Unreleased	Unreleased
World Neverland 2 Plus: Pluto Kyouwakoku Monogatari	Riverhillsoft	Riverhillsoft	2000-03-30^{JP}	March 30, 2000	Unreleased	Unreleased
World Series Baseball 2K1	Wow Entertainment	Sega	2000-07-25^{NA}	March 22, 2001	July 25, 2000	Unreleased
World Series Baseball 2K2	Visual Concepts	Sega	2001-08-14^{NA}	April 18, 2002	August 14, 2001	Unreleased
Worms Armageddon	Team17	Hasbro Interactive (as MicroProse)	1999-11-30^{PAL}	Unreleased	December 11, 1999	November 30, 1999
Worms World Party	Team17	Titus Interactive	2001-04-27^{PAL}	Unreleased	June 4, 2001	April 27, 2001
WWF Attitude	Acclaim Studios Salt Lake City	Acclaim Sports	1999-11-05^{PAL}	Unreleased	November 9, 1999	November 5, 1999
WWF Royal Rumble	Yuke's	THQ^{WW} Yuke's^{JP}	2000-08-14^{NA}	April 26, 2001	August 14, 2000	September 22, 2000
Yoshia no Oka de Nekoronde...	Mesa	Naxat Soft	2001-12-20^{JP}	December 20, 2001	Unreleased	Unreleased
Yu Suzuki Game Works Vol. 1	Sega AM2	Sega	2001-12-20^{JP}	December 20, 2001	Unreleased	Unreleased
Yukawa Motosenmu no Otakara Sagashi	Sega	Sega	1999-03-20^{JP}	March 20, 1999	Unreleased	Unreleased
Yuki Gatari	Takuyo	Takuyo	2002-12-26^{JP}	December 26, 2002	Unreleased	Unreleased
Yuukyuu Gensoukyoku 3: Perpetual Blue	Starlight Marry	MediaWorks	1999-12-22^{JP}	December 22, 1999	Unreleased	Unreleased
Yume Baken '99 Internet	Shangri-La	Shangri-La	1999-10-21^{JP}	October 21, 1999	Unreleased	Unreleased
Yume no Tsubasa: Fate of Heart	KID	KID	2001-07-26^{JP}	July 26, 2001	Unreleased	Unreleased
Zero Gunner 2	Psikyo	Psikyo	2001-09-06^{JP}	September 6, 2001	Unreleased	Unreleased
Zombie Revenge	Sega; Data East	Sega	1999-11-25^{JP}	November 25, 1999	January 25, 2000	June 9, 2000
Zusar Vasar	Real Vision	Real Vision	2000-07-27^{JP}	July 27, 2000	Unreleased	Unreleased

== Non-game software ==
Title(s)	Developer(s)	Publisher(s)	Release date		
Title(s)	Developer(s)	Publisher(s)	JP	NA	PAL
Deijko no Maibura	Isao	Isao	December 14, 2000	Unreleased	Unreleased
Dream Passport	Sega; Access	Sega	November 27, 1998	Unreleased	Unreleased
Dream Passport 2	Sega	Sega	August 5, 1999	Unreleased	Unreleased
Dream Passport 3	Sega; Access	Sega	April 29, 2000	Unreleased	Unreleased
DreamFlyer	Sega; Colabo; Gao	Sega	December 9, 1999	Unreleased	Unreleased
Dreamkey 1.0	Sega	Sega	Unreleased	Unreleased	October 14, 1999
Dreamkey 1.5	Sega	Sega	Unreleased	Unreleased	1999
Dreamkey 2.0	Sega	Sega	Unreleased	Unreleased	2001
Dreamkey 3.0	Sega	Sega	Unreleased	Unreleased	February 1, 2002
Dreamkey 3.1	Sega	Sega	Unreleased	Unreleased	February 2003 (in Spain and Portugal)
Dreamstudio	Nextech	Sega	November 9, 2000	Unreleased	Unreleased
Grauen no Torikago Kapitel 1: Keiyaku	Sega	Sega	September 30, 1999	Unreleased	Unreleased
Grauen no Torikago Kapitel 2: Torikago	Sega	Sega	November 25, 1999	Unreleased	Unreleased
Grauen no Torikago Kapitel 3: Kansei	Sega	Sega	January 27, 2000	Unreleased	Unreleased
Grauen no Torikago Kapitel 4: Kaikou	Sega	Sega	March 30, 2000	Unreleased	Unreleased
Grauen no Torikago Kapitel 5: Shokuzai	Sega	Sega	May 25, 2000	Unreleased	Unreleased
Grauen no Torikago Kapitel 6: Senritsu	Sega	Sega	July 27, 2000	Unreleased	Unreleased
Hello Kitty no 'Otonaru' Mail	Sega	Sega	April 13, 2000	Unreleased	Unreleased
JRA PAT for Dreamcast	Sega	Sega	2000	Unreleased	Unreleased
Kyotei for Dreamcast	Kyotei	Kyotei	2000	Unreleased	Unreleased
Nomura Home Trade	CSK	Sega	1999	Unreleased	Unreleased
O.to.i.Re: Dreamcast Sequencer	Waka Manufacturing	Waka Manufacturing	December 9, 1999	Unreleased	Unreleased
PlanetWeb Web Browser 1.0	Sega	Sega	Unreleased	1999	Unreleased
PlanetWeb Web Browser 2.0	Sega	Sega	Unreleased	1999	Unreleased
PlanetWeb Web Browser 3.0	Sega	Sega	Unreleased	1999	Unreleased
Sakura Taisen Kinematron Hanagumi Mail	Red Entertainment	Sega	December 28, 2000	Unreleased	Unreleased
ST Station Passport	ST	Sega	2000	Unreleased	Unreleased

== Unlicensed games ==
Title	Publisher	Developer	Genre	Year
2D House of Terror	2D Retroperspectives	2D Retroperspectives	Action	2013
4x4 Jam	JoshProd	Invictus Games	Racing	2017
Alice Dreams Tournament	Alice Team	Alice Team	Action	2017
Alice Sisters	JoshProd	OrionSoft	Platformer	2020
Alice's Mom's Rescue	Hucast Games (first run) / JoshProd (second run)	OrionSoft	Platformer	2015 / 2017
Another World HD	JoshProd	Delphine	Action	2018
Arcade Racing Legends	JoshProd	Intuitive Computer	Racing	2020
Armed Seven	JoshProd	Astro Port	Action	2019
Bang Bang Busters	JoshProd	Visco	Action	2018
Battle Crust	JoshProd	Picorinne Soft	Shoot 'em up	2018
Beats of Rage	Senile Team	Senile Team	Beat 'em up	2004
Bleemcast! for Gran Turismo 2	Bleem!	Bleem!	Racing	2001
Bleemcast! for Metal Gear Solid	Bleem!	Bleem!	Action/Adventure	2001
Bleemcast! for Tekken 3	Bleem!	Bleem!	Fighting	2001
Breakers	JoshProd	Visco	Fighting	2017
Captain Tomaday	JoshProd	Visco	Shoot 'em up	2019
Cave Story	DCEmulation	Daisuke Amaya	Metroidvania	2013
Cool Herders	GOAT Store	Harmless Lion LLC.	Party	2006
Counter-Strike	DCFan.net.ru	Valve	First-person shooter	2008
Crafti	DCEmulation	gameblabla	Survival	2017
Dreamcastnoid: Retail Enhanced Edition	Matranet	Ryo Suzuki	Arcade	2017
Driving Strikers	WAVE Game Studios	Reality Jump	Sports	2023
DUX	Hucast Games	KTX Software Dev.	Shoot 'em up	2009
DUX Version 1.5	Hucast Games (first run) / JoshProd (second run)	KTX Software Dev.	Shoot 'em up	2013 / 2018
Elansar & Philia	Hucast Games	OrionSoft	Point-and-click adventure	2015
Epitech Collection	Epitech	Epitech	Miscellaneous/Compilation	2002
Escape 2042: The Truth Defenders	OrionSoft	OrionSoft	Puzzle/Adventure	2017
Fade to Black	JoshProd	Delphine	Action-adventure	2018
Fast Striker	NG.DEV.TEAM	NG.DEV.TEAM	Shoot 'em up	2010
Feet of Fury	GOAT Store	GOAT Store	Rhythm	2003
Finding Teddy	JoshProd	Storybird	Adventure	2019
Flashback: The Quest for Identity	JoshProd	Delphine	Action	2017
Flea!	Lowtek Games (first run) / WAVE Game Studios (second run)	Lowtek Games	Platformer	2020
Frog Feast	OlderGames	OlderGames	Action	2007
Fruit'Y	Dragon Box	Retroguru	Puzzle	2015
FX Unit Yuki: The Henshin Engine	JoshProd	Saru Studio	Platformer	2019
Ganryu	JoshProd	Visco	Action	2017
Ghost Blade	Hucast Games (first run) / JoshProd (second run)	Hucast Games	Shoot 'em up	2015 / 2018
Ghoul Grind: Night of the Necromancer	Woog Worx	Woog Worx	Action/Platformer	2021
Giana's Return	Giana's Return Team	Giana's Return Team	Platformer	2011
Gunlord	NG.DEV.TEAM	NG.DEV.TEAM	Run 'n Gun	2012
Hanky Alien	DCEmulation	ant51	Shoot 'em up	2016
Hermes	Dragon Box (first run) / JoshProd (second run)	Retroguru	Platformer	2017 / 2022
Hydra Castle Labyrinth	E. Hashimoto	E. Hashimoto	Platformer	2020
Inhabitants	GOAT Store	S&F Software	Puzzle	2005
Intrepid Izzy	Senile Team (first run) / WAVE Game Studios (second run)	Senile Team	Action/Platformer	2021
IRiDES: Master of Blocks	GOAT Store	Madpeet	Puzzle	2009
James & Watch: Arm	Retro Gaming Roundup	Ben Lancaster	Puzzle	2015
James & Watch: Tooth Cracker	Retro Gaming Roundup	Ben Lancaster	Puzzle	2015
Jump'n Blob	2D Retroperspectives	2D Retroperspectives	Platformer	2011
Last Hope	RedSpotGames (first run) / NG.DEV.TEAM (second run)	NG.DEV.TEAM	Shoot 'em up	2007
Last Hope: Pink Bullets	NG.DEV.TEAM	NG.DEV.TEAM	Shoot 'em up	2009
Leona's Tricky Adventures	KTX Software Development	KTX Software Development	Puzzle/Adventure	2016
Magic Pockets	JoshProd	Bitmap Brothers	Platformer	2019
Maqiupai	GOAT Store	JMD	Puzzle	2005
Matterrun	Fuseki Games	Fuseki Games	Shoot 'em up	2017
NEO XYX	NG.DEV.TEAM	NG.DEV.TEAM	Shoot 'em up	2014
Neverball	DCEmu	DCEmu	Puzzle	2009
Non Casual Encounter : Prologue AKA Encuentro no casual: Prólogo	SEGASaturno Productions	Alfonso "Ryo Suzuki"	Visual Novel/Adventure	2021
Orion's Puzzle Collection	OrionSoft	OrionSoft	Puzzle	2016
Pier Solar and the Great Architects	WaterMelon Co.	Watermelon Co.	Role-playing	2015
POSTAL	WAVE Game Studios	Running with Scissors	Action	2022
Powder	Dreamcast.es	Jeff Lait	Role-playing	2015
Primitive Nightmare	Fuseki Games	Fuseki Games	Shoot 'em up	2010
Redux: Dark Matters	Hucast Games	KTX Software Development	Shoot 'em up	2014
Rocketron	JoshProd	Astro Port	Shoot 'em up	2020
Rush Rush Rally Racing	RedSpotGames	Senile Team	Racing	2009
Rush Rush Rally Reloaded	Senile Team	Senile Team	Racing	2017
Satazius Next	JoshProd	Astro Port	Shoot 'em up	2021
Shadow Gangs	WAVE Game Studios	JKM Corp	Beat 'em up	2022
SQRXZ	Retroguru	Retroguru	Platformer	2010
SQRXZ 2	Retroguru	Retroguru	Platformer	2010
SQRXZ 3	Retroguru	Retroguru	Platformer	2011
SQRXZ 4	Retroguru	Retroguru	Platformer	2014
Street Fighter VS Mortal Kombat	Captain Dreamcast	Captain Dreamcast	Fighting	2012
Sturmwind	RedSpotGames (first run) / Duranik (second run)	Duranik	Shoot 'em up	2013 / 2017
Supercharged Robot Vulkaiser	JoshProd	Astro Port	Shoot 'em up	2020
Tapeworm Disco Puzzle	Lowtek Games	Lowtek Games	Puzzle	2021
The Escapee	JoshProd	Invictus Games	Adventure	2018
The Textorcist	Gamefairy	Morbidware	Typing/bullet hell	2021
Tough Guy	JoshProd	Panda Software	Fighting	2020
Tyrian	Dreamcast.es	Dreamcast.es	Shoot 'em up	2008
Volgarr the Viking	Crazy Viking Studios (digital) / JoshProd (physical)	Crazy Viking Studios	Platformer	2015 / 2019
Wind and Water: Puzzle Battles	RedSpotGames	Yuan Works	Puzzle	2008
Witching Hour	PRO Studio	Nexinita	Adventure/Horror	2022
Wolflame	JoshProd	Astro Port	Shoot 'em up	2020
Xeno Crisis	Bitmap Bureau	Bitmap Bureau	Shoot 'em up	2020
Xenocider	Retro Sumus	Retro Sumus	Run 'n Gun	2021
Xump	Retroguru	Retroguru	Puzzle/Platformer	2013
Yeah Yeah Beebiss II	WAVE Game Studios	Rigg'd Games	Platformer	2021
Zia and the Goddesses of Magic	OrionSoft	OrionSoft	Role-playing	2016

== See also ==
- Dreamcast Collection
- List of Dreamcast online games
- List of cancelled Dreamcast games
