= Irides: Master of Blocks =

2009 video game

- Developer: Madpeet
- Publisher: GOAT Store Publishing
- Designers: Anddy Archer; Florian Zitzelsberger
- Platforms: Dreamcast, iOS
- Release: iPhone; June 26, 2009; Dreamcast; December 15, 2009
- Genre: Puzzle
- Modes: Single-player, multiplayer

Irides: Master of Blocks is an independently developed video game by American studio Madpeet and published by GOAT Store Publishing. It is a puzzle video game for the iPhone and Sega Dreamcast (for which it was unlicensed); both versions of the game were received positively by critics.

== Gameplay ==
All the Skins in Irides have an outer space theme.

Based around the concept of falling blocks, much like the Columns, Lumines, Tetris. Irides is a puzzle action game with some clever twists around conventional ideas. A 2 x 2 square (an O tetromino) made of four smaller block pieces is dropped into the playing field, which may appear different as the player advances through levels or skins. The small blocks that comprise the larger blocks will be one of two different colors. The objective is to rotate and align the blocks in such a way as to create 2x2 squares of the same color, which may span multiple blocks and, indeed, share blocks. For example, if one should get a 2x3 area of matching blocks, the middle portion will "share" itself with both the left and right halves and create two 2x2 squares. When too many unmatched blocks pile up to the point where no more blocks may be dropped in the playing field, the game ends.

When part of a falling block hits an obstruction, the unobstructed portion of the block will split off and continue to fall. More points are scored by creating the largest number of squares during one "timeline" sweep. Increasing score multipliers are earned by repeatedly clearing squares on consecutive timeline sweeps. Bonuses are also awarded by reducing all remaining tiles to one single color or for removing all non-active tiles from the screen altogether.

== Development ==
In 2005, Florian Zitzelsberger (founder of Mad Peet) made a homebrew Lumines clone for Dreamcast called BlockSmash.

In 2006, at the Midwest Gaming Classic GOAT Store Publishing announced 12 games for Dreamcast, as part of their game line up for the coming year. One of the announced games was a commercial sequel to BlockSmash titled Blocks^{2} (pronounced Blocks Squared). The same year the original BlockSmash was released on Sandman Demo Disk Volume 1

IRiDES was greatly inspired by Lumines

On June 27, 2009 Blocks^{2} was released for the iPhone

It was revealed on 9 September 2009 on the American Dreamcast's 10th anniversary, that the game would be making its way on the Dreamcast, under the new name Irides: Master of Blocks. The name was changed in order to make it sound more attractive to the buyers on Apple's App store. The new name is intended to be a short form of Iridescence, a 'play of lustrous, changing colors', resembling the importance of differently colored squares

Irides did not make the projected 2006–2007 release window, however it is the only project GSP announced at MGC that was completed. When asked why it took four years to complete the development of the game Loosen said:

All of the games we've published are independent people doing this work in their spare time. They get it done when they have time to get it done.

Irides was released in December 2009 by GOAT Store Publishing for Dreamcast. It was their first game release in three years. The game's release date was revealed alongside Rush Rush Rally Racing by RedSpotGames, a game that was once scheduled to be published by Goat Store.

== Soundtrack ==
The game contains 15 tracks, as with all GOAT store games since 2005; the sound track of the game can be played from the game disk itself in any audio CD player (the first track contains game data, whereas the remaining tracks have the background game music).

== Release ==
=== Sales ===
This is the first game released by GOAT Store not distributed by Lik-Sang as the online retailer ceased their operations in October 2006. Irides was also the first release from GOAT Store in over 3 years, and the game was distributed through various online retailers such as Play-Asia.

The game was prominently promoted at Midwest Gaming Classic show an event organized by the publisher.

Those who preordered the game for Dreamcast, received the iPhone version free.

A limited edition of Irides was also released with only 144 units pressed, The Limited Edition contained different disc and packaging art, an expanded instruction manual, an exclusive numbered mini-poster signed by the designer, and an exclusive numbered 2-inch-diameter (51 mm) collector's coin. The limited edition was available exclusively at the Publisher's website.

=== Reception ===
==== iPhone version ====
The general reception for the iPhone release has been positive, slidetoplay.com gave them 3 out of 4, praising the low price point, and the hours of fun the game had to offer.

==== Dreamcast version ====
Reception

Review score
Publication	Score
Jeuxvideo.com	14/20

Irides has received positive reviews. BeefJack gave the game an 8 out of 10 finding the Puzzle system deep, tactically complex and very rewarding. Diehard GameFan gave an overall positive review specifically enjoy the game's music and found it better in contrast to luminies, however they found the graphics a bit of a let down. Pinconeattack also echoed previous praising of the complexity of the puzzle system and enjoying the synth based music however they expressed concerns about the game's high price. SegaShiro praised the game for its easy-to-pick-up-and-play and hard-to-master gameplay, they also praised the game's soundtrack that can be played on a CD player from the gamedisk, although they were disappointed that the game had no Analog Stick support and found strange that a developer would add VMU and Rumble Pak support and not the Analog stick, although they called the lack of Analog stick support as minor setbacks. VGEvo praised the game for its multiplayer options and denounced the public perception of the game being a lumines clone, as the power ups and combo system sets the game apart, they were however disappointed that the game lacked the option to play against the computer.
