= Rush Rush =

Rush Rush may refer to:

- "Rush Rush" (Paula Abdul song), a 1991 song from the album Spellbound
- "Rush Rush" (Debbie Harry song), a 1983 song from the Scarface soundtrack

== See also ==
- Rush Rush Rally Racing, a 2009 video game
