= Intrepid Izzy =

2020 video game

- Developer: Senile Team
- Publisher: Wave Game Studios
- Designer: Roel van Mastbergen
- Composer: Ben Kurotoshiro
- Platforms: Dreamcast, Windows, PlayStation 4, PlayStation 5, Nintendo Switch, Xbox One, Xbox Series S/X
- Release: 26 July 2020: Dreamcast; AS: 20 August 2021; EU: 20 November 2021; NA: 20 December 2021; Windows; WW: 26 July 2020; Nintendo Switch; PlayStation 4; PlayStation 5; Xbox One; Xbox Series S/X; WW: 2 December 2022
- Genres: 2D platformer, Metroidvania
- Modes: Single-player, multiplayer

Intrepid Izzy, is a independently developed, commercially released video game developed by Dutch studio Senile Team and published by Wave Game Studios. It is a Metroidvania style 2D platformer for the Sega Dreamcast and Windows.

The game was announced in March 2017, followed by a Kickstarter campaign in September 2017, which was successfully funded the following month. Initially projected for a Fall 2018 release, after several delays it was released on 26 July 2020 on Steam. As the physical Dreamcast version could not be patched it was released the following year in August 2021. On December 2, 2022, the game was digitally released on Nintendo Switch, PlayStation 4, PlayStation 5, Xbox One, and Xbox Series S/X.

== Development ==
Intrepid Izzy was Senile Team's first new original game since 2009's Rush Rush Rally Racing. Development of Intrepid Izzy started after 2017's Rush Rush Rally Reloaded. The game was designed, illustrated, animated and programmed by Roel van Mastbergen on a proprietary engine with proprietary tools. Ben Kurotoshiro, who previously scored Rush Rush Rally Racing, returned to compose the music.

Senile Team revealed the project in March 2017. The developers launched a crowdfunding kickstarter campaign in September 2017, with the goal of raising €35,000 and a projected release date of October 2018. A playable demo was released on October 25, 2017. The game was successfully funded a day later with 413 backers pledging €36,367.

== Reception ==
Reception

Aggregate score
Aggregator	Score
Metacritic	(NS) 65/100

The Nintendo Switch version of Intrepid Izzy received "mixed or average" reviews from critics, according to the review aggregation website Metacritic.

The Steam version of Intrepid Izzy received an honorable mention on Digital Foundry Top 2021 games with Audie Serlie describing the game as "an excellent game that combines things like Wonder Boy, Gianna Sisters, and Street Fighter all into one package that works surprisingly well.

The Dreamcast version was reviewed by Lewis Cox from the Dreamcast junkyard who acknowledged that Intrepid Izzy built on the foundation of Senile Team's debut title Beats of Rage and featured many callbacks to classic franchises like Capcom's Street Fighter and Sega's Hang-On, and called it the king (or queen) of Indie Dreamcast platformers.

The Playstation 5 version of the game was reviewed by Andy Schneider from Mega Visions, he gave the game five out of five stars and favorably compared the game to classic Sega franchises such as Alex Kidd and Kid Chameleon, "For old school gamers, like myself, this game is a rare treat. It reminded me of many great games from the past."
