= Dreamcast homebrew =

Unofficial games released for the Sega console

Though Sega officially discontinued its Dreamcast video game console in 2001, and released the console's last official game in 2007, Dreamcast homebrew developers continued to release unofficial games for the console. Unlike homebrew communities for other consoles, the Dreamcast homebrew developers are organized in development teams, such as Redspotgames.

== Community ==
Redspotgames is a German homebrew publisher.

NG:DEV.TEAM

== Games ==
This is a partial list of games. For a more complete list, see List of Dreamcast homebrew games

- 4x4 Jam
- Alice Dreams Tournament
- Dynamite Dreams
- Elysian Shadows
- Escape 2042: The Truth Defenders
- Rush Rush Rally Racing (R4)
- Saber Rider
- SLaVE
- Xenocider
