= Miss Moonlight =

Miss Moonlight can refer to:

- Maxine Mesinger, a gossip columnist
- Miss Moonlight (video game), a Dreamcast video game
