= Undercover AD2025 Kei =

2000 video game

- Developer: Pulse Interactive
- Publisher: Pulse Interactive
- Director: Takashi Yoneda
- Producer: Masayasu Ishikawa
- Designer: Takashi Yoneda
- Programmer: Hiroshi Nakamoto
- Artist: Akira Iketani
- Writer: Arimasa Osawa
- Composer: Kazuhiko Gomi
- Platform: Dreamcast
- Release: JP: January 27, 2000
- Genre: Action-adventure
- Mode: Single-player

Undercover AD2025 Kei is a 2000 Japanese video game for the Dreamcast.

== Gameplay ==
Gameplay screenshot

The game is a 3D action adventure shooter with auto-aim.

== Plot ==
The story starts with a police woman (Kei) and her boyfriend, who is also a police officer, responding to a terrorist call at a hotel. Her boyfriend is blown up by a man named Lon Wei, and the game follows Kei as she goes on an undercover mission to avenge him.

== Development ==
The game was announced in 1999 in a hotel. It is for the Sega Dreamcast.

== Reception ==
Reception

Review scores
Publication	Score
Famitsu	24/40
GameSpot	1.8/10
IGN	2.5/10
Consoles +	79%
Gameplay RPG	39%
Video Games	10/100
Gamers' Republic	33/100
Joypad	4/10
Dreamzone	45/100
Gamers	3.3/5

Critics largely gave the game negative reviews.

GameSpot.

IGN.

Consoles +

Gameplay RPG

Joypad

Dreamzone
