= Sports Jam =

2000 video game

- Developer: WOW Entertainment
- Publishers: JP: Sega; NA: Agetec
- Platforms: NAOMI, Dreamcast
- Release: Arcade: JP: December 2000; WW: 2001; Dreamcast: JP: April 12, 2001; NA: July 2001
- Genre: Sports video game
- Modes: Single-player, multiplayer

Sports Jam (スポーツ・ジャム, Supōtsu Jamu) is a video game developed by WOW Entertainment for the Sega NAOMI and Dreamcast in 2000–2001.

== Gameplay ==
Sports Jam features twelve arcade-style sporting challenges covering several disciplines, including basketball, baseball, association football, American football, golf, tennis and ice hockey. Individual events test skills such as shooting, batting, goalkeeping and racing, with each challenge featuring its own rules and objectives.

== Reception ==
Reception

Aggregate score
Aggregator	Score
Metacritic	64/100

Review scores
Publication	Score
AllGame	(DC) 3.5/5 (ARC) 2/5
Consoles +	85%
Edge	6/10
Electronic Gaming Monthly	5.67/10 (Note: Two critics of Electronic Gaming Monthly gave the Dreamcast version each a score of 5.5/10, and the other gave it 6/10.)
Famitsu	27/40
Game Informer	7.75/10
Gamekult	5/10
IGN	7.1/10
Next Generation	3/5

The Dreamcast version received "mixed" reviews according to the review aggregation website Metacritic. Tokyo Drifter of GamePro said, "With many degrees of selectable difficulty, a wide variety of events, and the ability to customize your own tournament, Sports Jam offers lots of replay value and fun." (Note: GamePro gave the Dreamcast version 3.5/5 for graphics, 3/5 for sound, and two 4/5 scores for control and fun factor.) Rob Smolka of NextGen said of the game, "Essentially a group of sports-based Java applets, there's enough charm and challenge to keep you coming back to improve your score." In Japan, Famitsu gave it a score of 27 out of 40.

Also in Japan, Game Machine listed the arcade version in their February 15, 2001 issue as the third most-successful arcade game of the month.
