= The Lost Golem =

2000 video game

- Developer: Caramelpot
- Publisher: Caramelpot
- Director: Shuichi Ishikawa
- Artist: Ryotaro Itoh
- Composers: Yasunori Murakita; Masakazu Shin-ya
- Platform: Dreamcast
- Release: JP: February 24, 2000
- Genre: Puzzle Game
- Modes: Single-player, multiplayer

The Lost Golem (ゴーレムのまいご, Golem no Maigo) is a puzzle game for the Dreamcast developed and published by Caramelpot and released in Japan only in 2000.

== Gameplay ==
The player controls a golem and must lead a king through a castle to safety. The king walks on his own and turns when he hits a wall, so the player moves walls to guide him to safety.

== Reception ==
The Lost Golem sold under 500 copies, making it obscure and relatively hard to find. Despite poor sales, it has become a cult classic among Dreamcast owners.
