= Zusar Vasar =

2000 video game

- Cover art
- Developer: Real Vision
- Publisher: Real Vision
- Platform: Dreamcast
- Release: JP: July 27, 2000
- Genre: Racing
- Modes: Single-player, multiplayer

Zusar Vasar (Japanese: ズサーヴァサー, Hepburn: Zusā Vasā) is a racing video game developed and published by Real Vision in Japan on July 27, 2000 for Dreamcast.

== Gameplay ==
The player controls a chariot drawn by robotic animals around courses on land, sea or in the air. Weapons can be equipped in the game, but only in the Battle Mode.
