= Coaster Works =

1999 video game

- European Dreamcast cover art
- Developer: Bimboosoft
- Publishers: JP: Bottom Up; WW: Xicat Interactive
- Platform: Dreamcast
- Release: JP: December 9, 1999; NA: April 3, 2001; EU: June 29, 2001
- Genre: Simulation
- Mode: Single-player

Coaster Works, known in Japan as Jet Coaster Dream (ジェットコースタードリーム, Jetto Kōsutā Dorīmu), is a simulation game for the Dreamcast console developed by Bimboosoft. The game is a simulation of roller coaster design and construction. Each of the levels offer certain requirements that the player must meet to pass to the next level. The game starts the player off in a "kiddie" themed park and progresses to more and more difficult levels with more difficult requirements. A direct sequel titled Jet Coaster Dream 2 (ジェットコースタードリーム2, Jetto Kōsutā Dorīmu 2) was released on November 2, 2000 in Japan only as the North American and PAL releases were cancelled for 2001. A third game titled Rollercoaster World was developed by Takara and published by D3 Publisher in Japan as Simple 2000 Series Vol. 33: The Jet Coaster (SIMPLE 2000 シリーズ Vol.33 THE ジェットコースター, Shinpuru 2000 Shirīzu Vol. 33 Za Jetto Kōsutā) (part of the Simple 2000 series) on July 24, 2003, and by Midas Interactive Entertainment in Europe on May 21, 2004 for the PlayStation 2.

== Reception ==
Reception

Aggregate score
Aggregator	Score
Metacritic	70/100

Review scores
Publication	Score
Famitsu	(1) 28/40 (PS2) 27/40 (2) 25/40
GameSpot	5.4/10
IGN	8.4/10
Jeuxvideo.com	(PS2) 2/20
Next Generation	2/5

The game received "mixed or average reviews" according to the review aggregation website Metacritic. IGN gave it favorable reviews, while GameSpot gave it mixed reviews, months before the game was released Stateside. Eric Bratcher of NextGen, however, said of the game, "The engine is fast (though graphically bland), but a trip to a real amusement park would cost about the same and last longer than four hours. Plus, you could buy corn dogs and funnel cake." In Japan, Famitsu gave it a score of 28 out of 40 for the first Jet Coaster Dream, 25 out of 40 for the sequel, and 27 out of 40 for the PlayStation 2 version.
