= Nanatsu no Hikan: Senritsu no Bishō =

2000 video game

- Developer: Koei
- Publisher: Koei
- Composer: Hiroshi Miyagawa
- Platform: Dreamcast
- Release: JP: January 20, 2000
- Genre: Survival horror
- Modes: Single-player, multiplayer

Nanatsu no Hikan: Senritsu no Bishō (Japanese: 七つの秘館 戦慄の微笑; lit. "Seven Mysterious Mansions: Shivery Smile"), also known as Seven Mansions, is a survival horror video game developed and published by Koei for the Sega Dreamcast. It was released on January 20, 2000, in Japan. The game is a sequel to the 1996 Sony PlayStation and Sega Saturn game Nanatsu no Hikan.

== Gameplay ==
The player can control one of two characters: Kei and Reina. The game can be played in either first person, third person, or at a fixed camera angle. Kei's levels are more action based, while Reina's are more adventure-based.

The title was the first survival horror game to feature a real-time cooperative mode; players control two characters independently and simultaneously. This mode has different objectives, monsters and events from the single-player mode.

== Plot ==
Friends Kei and Reina land on a mysterious island and search for their friend Ernest. Along the way, they encounter monsters in the different mansions they discover. It's up to them to defeat these foes, find their friend, and understand the mysteries of the island.

== Development ==
The game was developed for the Sega Saturn in the Winter of 1997 (later Winter 1998), before development moved to the Dreamcast. It was planned for an international release, but it was cancelled.

An unofficial English patch was released for the game.

== Reception ==
After briefly playing the multi-player mode, IGN said that Nanatsu no Hikan: Senritsu no Bishō "is worth a try by importers looking for something different."
