= TNN Motorsports Hardcore Heat =

1999 video game

- North American Dreamcast cover art
- Developer: CRI
- Publishers: JP: CRI; NA: ASC Games; EU: Sega
- Platform: Dreamcast
- Release: JP: July 8, 1999; NA: September 9, 1999; EU: October 22, 1999
- Genre: Racing
- Modes: Single-player, multiplayer

TNN Motorsports HardCore Heat ("Great Buggy" in early development), known in Japan and Europe as Buggy Heat (バギーヒート, Bagī Hīto), is an off-road racing video game for the Dreamcast, developed and published by CRI, and published by ASC Games and Sega in 1999.

== Vehicles ==
- Matador
- Reaper
- HammerHead
- Avalanche
- Dune Hopper
- Girth 2000
- Coyote
- LE-2001

== Reception ==
Reception

Aggregate score
| Aggregator | Score |
|---|---|
| GameRankings | 62% |

Review scores
| Publication | Score |
|---|---|
| AllGame | 2/5 |
| CNET Gamecenter | 5/10 |
| Edge | 6/10 |
| Electronic Gaming Monthly | 4/10 (Note: In Electronic Gaming Monthly's review of the game, one critic gave it 3.5/10, another gave it 4.5/10, and the rest gave it each a score of 4/10.) |
| Famitsu | 26/40 |
| Game Informer | 5.75/10 |
| GameFan | 64% |
| GameSpot | 4.6/10 |
| GameSpy | 4.5/10 |
| IGN | 6/10 |
| Next Generation | 2/5 |

The game received mixed reviews according to the review aggregation website GameRankings. Adam Pavlacka of NextGen said, "If you absolutely must play an off-road racing game, go ahead and rent this one. If you want to buy, bide your time and wait for Sega Rally 2, a much better game all around." In Japan, Famitsu gave it a score of 26 out of 40. GamePro said of the game, "What makes a race game sink or swim is its ability to make you play it over and over. Hardcore Heat offers some of the things that have made other games very addictive, but the limited track and car selection along with the game play problems have kept some of the mud from washing off of this title. But if you are an off-road addict and need the power of the Dreamcast, this is your title... for now. (Note: GamePro gave the game 4/5 for graphics, two 3/5 scores for sound and control, and 3.5/5 for fun factor.)

The Japanese version was praised for its visuals, but criticized for flawed controls; in the American release, the control issues were mostly fixed.
