= Lik Sang =

Asian electronics distributor

Lik Sang Pacific Game Technology (Holding) Limited
- Type: Private
- Industry: Video games, consumer electronics
- Founded: 1998
- Defunct: 2006
- Fate: Closure due to lawsuit by Sony
- Headquarters: Hong Kong
- Key people: Pascal Clarysse, Alex Kampl, Nils Ahlswede
- Products: import games, toys, figures, anime-related items, and obscure adapters and controllers for various game platforms.
- Website: http://www.lik-sang.com/

Lik Sang
- Chinese: 力生
- Literal meaning: Powerful [and] energetic
Transcriptions
Standard Mandarin
- Hanyu Pinyin: Lìshēng
Yue: Cantonese
- Jyutping: lik6 sang1

Lik Sang (Chinese: 力生; Jyutping: lik6 sang1; lit. 'powerful and energetic') was a popular distributor of Asian electronics. The company sold import games, toys, figures, anime-related items, and obscure adapters and controllers for various video game platforms. Lik Sang closed as of October 24, 2006, as a result of multiple lawsuits filed against them by Sony.

== History ==
=== Launch ===
Lik-Sang was established in 1998 in Hong Kong. It became well known for its sales of modchips for video game consoles that enabled the normally locked-down consoles to play import and homebrew games, but it also allowed the use of pirated video games. The modchips were not all physical chips; they included devices such as flash cartridges that allow Game Boy users to upload ROMs and homebrew applications onto the device, and play them as if it were a regular gaming cartridge.

=== Legal issues ===
In 2002, the company was sued by major video game console producers, such as Sony Computer Entertainment, Nintendo and Microsoft Corporation, alleging contributory copyright infringement as the modchips (and other related devices) enabled playing of unauthorized video game titles on those consoles. The High Court of Hong Kong granted injunctions preventing Lik-Sang from selling these devices. After these suits, Lik-Sang began expanding its area of expertise by reinventing itself (under a new owner) as a vendor of legitimate, but obscure, accessories, such as consumer electronics, games, merchandise, and t-shirts.

=== Partnering with independent developers ===
Lik-Sang was a strong supporter of the Dreamcast Community, in 2003 they partnered with Dreamcast-Scene (DCS) and GOAT Store to promote independently developed games, they had an exclusive deal with GOAT Store that made them the sole distributor of all independently released games until their demise in 2006.

With GOAT Store Publishing they distributed 4 games offering free shipping all over the world.

=== Closure ===
In August 2005, the company was once again in legal trouble, this time from Sony. Lik-Sang had imported PlayStation Portable devices from areas where they were available, and re-exported them to UK customers before the UK release date, which Sony alleged was a violation of trademark rights. Lik-Sang continued shipping PSPs, claiming Hong Kong's trademark law follows the principle of international exhaustion of trademark rights and therefore allows an item to be traded freely once it appears in a market anywhere in the world.

On October 18, 2006, the High Court in London (Patents Court) ruled the shipments were indeed in breach of Sony's rights. The following day, Lik-Sang posted a message on their website claiming they had been forced out of business due to Sony's legal action. Sony responded in a statement saying that Lik-Sang had not contested the case, thus incurring no legal fees, and had not paid any damages or costs to Sony. However, Lik-Sang replied once more that their legal representatives spent over a year to contest the UK's court jurisdiction and tried to defend against Sony's allegations of parallel importation and copyright infringement, and that Sony launched duplicate actions in different countries. According to Lik-Sang's final statements, two different judges expressed their surprise about the high legal expenses claimed by Sony.

Since October 24, 2006, Lik-Sang's website has been offline. The Lik-Sang forums have also been closed down. Between 2006 and 2014, the domain carried only a letter to former customers in regards to the ruling, and the circumstances surrounding it. Since 2014, the domain simply redirects to this Wikipedia article.

== Court decisions against Lik Sang ==
The following decisions against Lik Sang can be read on-line:

- SCEI v Lik Sang International Ltd (High Court of Hong Kong, 2003)
- Nintendo v Lik Sang International Ltd (High Court of Hong Kong, 2003)
- SCEI v Pacific Game Technology (UK Patents Court, 2006)

== Legacy ==
Lik-Sang is widely known in console gaming circles. Some even form a verb with the name, as in "I could Lik-Sang the controller if I had the money", and cult game site Penny Arcade often spoke about Lik-Sang and featured them in their webcomics.

Famed iPhone and PlayStation jailbreaker Geohot makes mention of Lik Sang in his rap response to Sony's lawsuit against him, where he raps "I shed a tear every time I think of Lik Sang".
