= Speed Busters =

1998 video game

- European Windows cover art
- Developer: Ubi Soft Montreal
- Publisher: Ubi Soft
- Platforms: Windows, Dreamcast, Mobile phones
- Release: Windows: NA: November 23, 1998; EU: 1998; Dreamcast: EU: October 14, 1999; NA: October 29, 1999; JP: November 18, 2000; Online Racing: NA: December 13, 2000; EU: February 2, 2001; Mobile: NA: July 3, 2003
- Genre: Arcade Racing
- Modes: Single-player, multiplayer

Speed Busters (known in North America as Speed Busters: American Highways) is a video game developed by Ubisoft's Montreal studio for Microsoft Windows in 1998. It was released for the Dreamcast in 1999 as Speed Devils. This racing game features courses with hazards such as dinosaurs, rolling boulders, and UFOs set in exotic locales, including Louisiana, Louisiana Tornado, New York City, New York City Winter, Mexico, Nevada, Aspen Summer, Aspen Winter, Canada (supposedly northern Quebec), Canada Light Winter, Canada Heavy Winter, Montreal Industrial, Hollywood, and Hollywood Disaster. The console version's career mode allows players to advance through the ranks of a fictional racing league. Colorful rivals challenge players to accomplish specific feats during races, placing bets using prize money earned from competitions. The money earned from gambling and performance is used to purchase cars, upgrade them, and maintain them. The game also supports up to five players on a single Dreamcast console.

In December 2000, Ubisoft published Speed Devils Online Racing, an updated version of the game for the Dreamcast that added online play.

== Reception ==
Reception

Aggregate score
Aggregator	Score		
Aggregator	Dreamcast	mobile	PC
GameRankings	78%	65%	79%

Review scores
Publication	Score		
Publication	Dreamcast	mobile	PC
CNET Gamecenter	8/10	N/A	7/10
Computer Gaming World	N/A	N/A	3.5/5
Electronic Gaming Monthly	6.83/10	N/A	N/A
Famitsu	29/40	N/A	N/A
Game Informer	7.25/10	N/A	N/A
GameFan	(J.W.) 81% 71%	N/A	N/A
GamePro	4.5/5	N/A	N/A
GameRevolution	C+	N/A	B+
GameSpot	8.2/10	6.5/10	7.5/10
GameSpy	8.5/10	N/A	N/A
IGN	7.9/10	N/A	7.8/10
Next Generation	4/5	N/A	N/A
PC Accelerator	N/A	N/A	7/10
PC Gamer (US)	N/A	N/A	85%

Speed Busters: American Highways and Speed Devils received favorable reviews, while the mobile version of the latter received mixed reviews, according to the review aggregation website GameRankings. GameRevolution reviewed the Dreamcast version, stating, "At the finish line, Speed Devils is an above-average racer, but not much more." The reviewer noted that the game featured good graphics and appealing cars but suffered from poorly designed tracks, leaving players wondering how they managed to drive off a cliff without noticing it. The article also criticized the game's two-player mode for being boring and drawn out. Edge rated the same console version seven out of ten, stating, "While not outstanding in any particular regard, Speed Devils is good entertainment that should captivate anyone tired of realistic racers with its accessible and player-friendly arcade-like nature." Chris Charla of NextGen described the same console version as "the best racing game you can find on Dreamcast today." In Japan, where the same console version was released on November 18, 1999, Famitsu awarded it a score of 29 out of 40.

Nick Smith of AllGame gave Speed Busters: American Highways three-and-a-half stars out of five, stating, "You'll have a fast and furious time with SpeedBusters [sic]—but only if you have a competent graphics card. If you've got a puny PC with little video memory, forget it." However, Jonathan Sutyak rated Speed Devils two-and-a-half stars out of five, commenting, "If you can overlook the obstacles, or even enjoy them, you may get a kick out of some of the races. Although the ability to run tracks in the opposite direction with some different obstacles is a plus, Speed Devils becomes repetitive due to the long laps of each track and the weak computer opponents. They may try to block you when you attempt to pass and will also ram into you, but ultimately, they do not provide an exceptional challenge."

=== Speed Devils Online Racing ===
Speed Devils Online Racing

Aggregate score
Aggregator	Score
Metacritic	76/100

Review scores
Publication	Score
Game Informer	7.5/10
GameSpot	7/10
IGN	7.2/10

Speed Devils Online Racing received "generally favorable reviews" according to the review aggregation website Metacritic.

== See also ==
- Asphalt, a series of arcade racing games by Gameloft
