= Iron Aces =

2000 video game

- North American Dreamcast cover art
- Developer: Marionette
- Publishers: JP: Global A Entertainment; WW: Xicat Interactive
- Platform: Dreamcast
- Release: JP: June 29, 2000; NA: February 6, 2001; PAL: June 29, 2001
- Genre: Combat flight simulator
- Modes: Single-player, multiplayer

Iron Aces (Note: known in Japan as Imperial no Taka: Fighter of Zero (インペリアルの鷹 FIGHTER OF ZERO)) is a World War II flight simulation video game developed by Japanese studio Marionette and published by Xicat Interactive for the Dreamcast. It was released in Japan on June 29, 2000, in North America on February 6, 2001, and in Europe on June 29, 2001. A sequel to the game, Iron Aces 2: Birds of Prey, was released for the PlayStation 2 in 2002.

== Gameplay ==
The game is set in a "semi-fictional World War 2", in which players battle for control of a series of fictional islands including Trincer and Valiant.

== Reception ==
Iron Aces garnered mixed reviews from critics; it received a 69.48% from GameRankings. GameZone praised the variety of planes found in the game and the intense feel to the dogfights. IGN's Anthony Chau criticized the game's graphics, but noted that the game will suffice for flight simulator fans. GameSpot's Trevor Rivers noted that the game's inconsistency lowered the amount of fun to be had from the game, and gave it a mediocre overall review.
