= Rush Rush Rally Racing =

2009 video game

- Official cover art of Rush Rush Rally Racing
- Developer: Senile Team
- Publisher: RedSpotGames
- Designer: Roel Van Mastbergen
- Composer: Ben Kurotoshiro
- Platforms: Dreamcast, Wii
- Release: Dreamcast: EU: November 4, 2009; WiiWare: EU: April 19, 2012
- Genre: Racing
- Modes: Single-player, multiplayer

Rush Rush Rally Racing, also known as R4, is an independently developed, commercially released video game developed by Dutch studio Senile Team and published by RedSpotGames. It is a top-down 2D racing game for the Sega Dreamcast and Wii similar to Micro Machines, an easy to pick up and play and hard to master type of racer.

On February 24, 2017, the game received a re-release titled Rush Rush Rally Reloaded.

== Gameplay ==
Rush Rush Rally Racing has several game play modes. The goal of the single player grand prix mode is to qualify each race by finishing third, second, or in first place. If the player qualifies the race, they will proceed to the next level. If the player doesn't qualify, they can retry the level until their continues run out. The Grand Prix mode consists of 10 levels, after which the player is rewarded with an ending sequence. However, if the player finishes in first place in all levels, an 11th level is unlocked, and other ending sequences are shown, depending on whether the player finishes first in this level also.

In the versus mode 2, 3, or 4 player can race against each other in a split screen mode. Nine levels are initially available for all multiplayer modes, in addition to the Grand Prix levels which can also be played. The item mode is the same as the versus mode, with the addition of various items that are scattered around the levels, such as oil slicks, super speed, invisibility, turn 180 degrees, etc. In the Get Ahead two player mode, the objective is to get so far ahead of your opponent that they disappear from the screen. Each time a player succeeds in doing so, they earn one token. The first player to earn 5 tokens is the winner.

== Development ==
Senile Team started the project as an entry for a coding competition sponsored by Lik Sang in 2006. They chose to make a racing game because they believed it could be completed in a short time span, would stand out from the competition as majority of Dreamcast games released post discontinuation were Puzzle or Shooters. Retro over the head racers such as Combat Cars, Micro Machines, and Thrash Rally were cited as influences for the game. Lik-Sang was forced out of business on October 24, 2006, due to multiple lawsuits by Sony Computer Entertainment Europe prior to the coding competition and Senile Team had prepared for the contest entry a minimal feature set: one player, one type of car.

Senile Team were proud with the work done on the game, however, it was not fit for publishing so they expanded upon the original idea and continued working. It took Senile Team three years to finish it. At Gamescom 2010, Senile Team and RedSpotGames announced the game for WiiWare, with 2 new modes (challenge and time attack), the game was playable at RedSpotGames' booth along with their other past and upcoming games.

In 2017, Josh Prod published a Dreamcast version with all the Wii updates titled Rush Rush Rally Reloaded. A steam port was released in August 3, 2022.

== Reception ==
Rush Rush Rally Racing did not receive many reviews due to the title's release on the Sega Dreamcast, which at the time of the game's release had been out of production for eight years. BeefJack gave the game a score of 8.8 out of 10, citing the focus on difficult gameplay which required multiple playthroughs, and high level of presentation for not only an indie game but a Dreamcast game in general, as highlights: "a steep learning curve that works in favour of the title. As you master these levels and progress through the challenge is constantly with you, always keeping the gameplay fresh and intense...Because of this races always remain highly enjoyable as even after repeated plays things here never become stale. It's certainly a system that requires you give a little to get the most out of it, but it's ultimately very rewarding".

The British magazine GamesTM praised Rush Rush Rally Racing as "One of the best multiplayer Dreamcast games ever made". The Australian video game talk show Good Game's two reviewers gave the game a 4/10 and 5/10. Retro Gamer magazine awarded the game an 84% score, stating that "it does suffer from a high difficulty curve and certain tracks can be a little confusing on first play, but this remains a superb little racer."
