= Video game piracy =

Form of copyright infringement

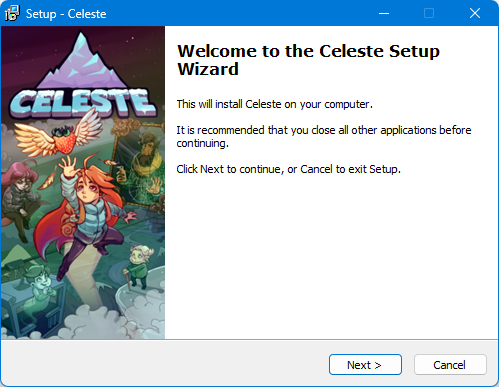
Pirate installation wizard for Celeste

Video game piracy is the unauthorized copying and distributing of video game software, and is a form of copyright infringement. It is often cited as a major problem that video game publishers face when distributing their products, due to the ease of being able to distribute paid games for free, via torrenting or websites offering direct download links. Right holders generally attempt to counter piracy of their products by enforcing the Digital Millennium Copyright Act, though this has never been totally successful. Digital distribution of pirated games has historically occurred on bulletin board systems (BBS), and more recently via decentralized peer-to-peer torrenting. In terms of physical distribution, China, Indonesia, and Vietnam are known for major manufacturing and distribution centers for pirated game copies, while Hong Kong and Singapore are major importers.

== History and culture ==
As the personal computer rose to prominence in the mid to late 1970s, so too did the tendency to copy video games onto floppy disks and cassette tapes, and share pirated copies by hand. Piracy networks can be traced back to the mid-1980s, with infrastructure changes resulting from the Bell System breakup serving as a major catalyst. Video game trading circles began to emerge in the years following, with networks of computers, connected via modem to long-distance telephone lines, transmitting the contents of floppy discs. These trading circles became colloquially known as the Warez scene, with the term "warez" being an informal bastardization of "software".

In the 1980s, crack intros began appearing on pirated games. Preceding the booting of the actual game, these windows would contain the monikers of those who created the pirated copy, along with any messages they wanted to add. Beginning as simple text, the presentation of these crack intros gradually grew more complex, with windows featuring GIFs, music, and colorful designs.

With the rise of bulletin board systems throughout the 1980s and into the 1990s, the sharing of pirated video games took a centralized form. By connecting personal computers to telephone modems, and dialing a number to a dedicated server, members of the Warez scene could share their copies of video games. Furthermore, because this system preceded the rise of the consumer-level internet, it could go relatively unnoticed. However, with the rise of peer-to-peer torrenting, and notably with the release of BitTorrent in 2001, this BBS format of video game piracy began to decline. Nowadays, torrenting pirated games remains the popular choice among those who engage in piracy. Efforts to thwart illegal torrenting have historically failed, because its decentralized nature makes it effectively impossible to totally dismantle.

== Anti-piracy measures ==
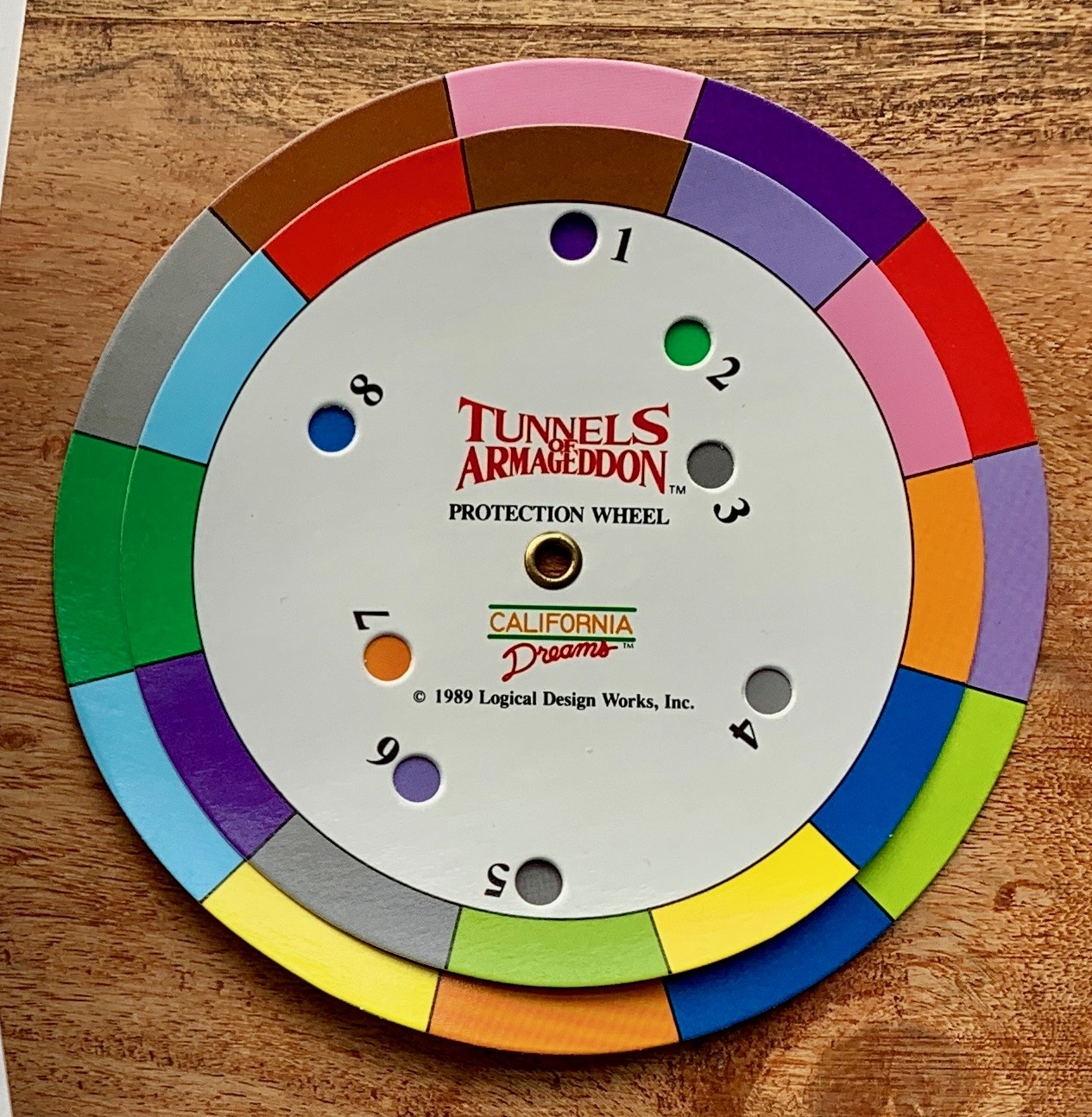
A code wheel from the 1989 game Tunnels of Armageddon

The use of copy protection has been a commonplace throughout the history of video games. Early copy protection measures for video games included Lenslok, code wheels, and special instructions that would require the player to own the manual. Several early copy protection measures have been criticized for both their ineffectiveness at preventing piracy, and their inconvenience to the player. One of the most typical means of copy protection is to assign a serial key to each legitimate copy of the game, so that it can only be activated by entering the serial. However, this is often circumvented via software cracking, or through the use of a keygen.

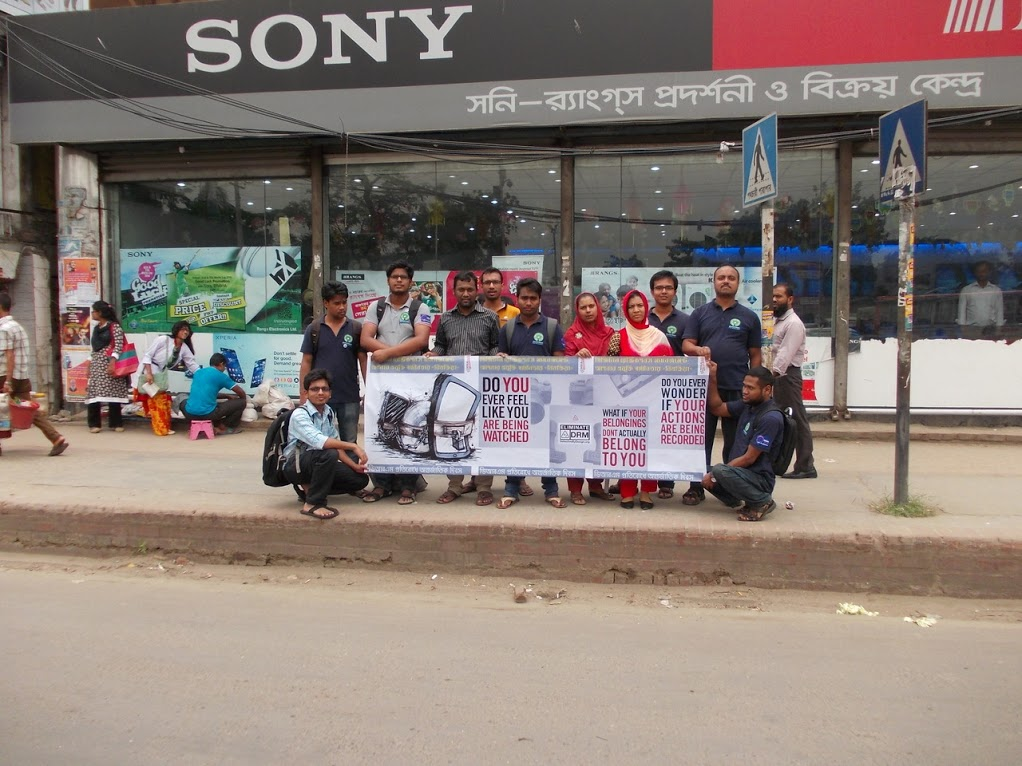
A 2016 protest in Dhaka against digital rights management

More recent attempts to hinder piracy have included digital rights management tools. A form of this is the sale of games on digital distribution platforms, such as the Epic Games Store, Blizzard's Battle.net, and Steam. Steam offers proprietary features such as accelerated downloads, cloud saves, automatic patching, and achievements that pirated copies do not have. The purpose of these features is to make piracy look less attractive, and to incentivize the legitimate purchase of games. Gabe Newell, creator of Steam, has stated that creating "service value" discourages piracy more than adding additional DRM. Some games, such as Grand Theft Auto IV, use DRM that negatively alters gameplay, if it detects that the game is an illegitimate copy. In GTA IV's case, it disables the brakes on cars and gives the camera an amplified drunk effect, making gameplay much harder, thus creating an incentive to legitimately purchase the game.

Sometimes, games require online authentication or have always-on DRM. A notable incident concerning always-on DRM took place in 2021, surrounding the Windows release of Crash Bandicoot 4: It's About Time. Without a constant internet connection, the game's DRM disallows any play at all, even in single-player, which naturally drew ire. However, the Warez scene cracked this DRM feature almost immediately. A cracked version of Crash Bandicoot 4, stripped of this DRM, began circulating online just one day after its official release.

== Emulation and piracy ==
Historically, video game companies have blamed video game emulators for piracy, despite the fact that anyone can create their own legal ROM image from the original media. Concerning this demonization of emulators, video game historian Frank Cifaldi attributed it to the Connectix Virtual Game Station. Released in 1999, this commercial emulator enabled the play of Sony PlayStation games on Macintosh computers. However, it was easily cracked by hackers to play pirated ISO images of PlayStation games, leading to a lawsuit from Sony. Companies continued to fear that emulators would encourage piracy. This has created a long-running debate over emulation, since many out-of-print video games can only be played via ROM, making emulators the only replacement for defunct video game consoles. Additionally, modern remasters and remakes can significantly alter a game, sometimes in a manner that changes the entire gameplay experience. For example, Crash Bandicoot N. Sane Trilogy had a rewritten physics engine, requiring players to make more precise jumps. Such gameplay changes give importance to emulators, which may be able to run the original game.

Some companies still consider emulators copyright-infringing. In 2017, Atlus attempted to take down the Patreon page of a PlayStation 3 emulator, RPCS3, arguing that the ability to play Persona 5 on it made it illegal software. However, Patreon disagreed with the company's stance, and allowed the page to remain, as long as references to Persona 5 were removed. Furthermore, Nintendo has taken decisive action against the emulation of its games in recent years. In 2018, the company sued a handful of large ROM sites, forcing them to remove ROMs of their older console games, for what they called “brazen and mass-scale infringement of Nintendo’s intellectual property rites [sic]". The distribution of copied ROM files online is illegal, but this move by Nintendo was interpreted by the emulation scene as an attack on the emulation of older games. In November 2020, Nintendo issued a cease and desist order to The Big House, an annual Super Smash Bros tournament. The Big House ran SSB games on the Dolphin emulator, and it was the addition of the mod Slippi, which enabled online play, that caught Nintendo's attention.

Despite longstanding criticism of emulators in the game industry, companies themselves have used emulation to run commercial games. Nintendo operated the Virtual Console, which allowed people to buy and play certain games via emulation. In 2017, the PlayStation 4 was found to contain a functioning internal PSP emulator. Hackers discovered that PaRappa the Rapper Remastered was actually the 2007 PSP version, running with upscaled textures. This emulator was later reverse-engineered and used to play other PSP games. Additionally, Microsoft's Xbox One console uses a proprietary emulator in order to play games released for the original Xbox, and the Xbox 360.

== Console modding and piracy ==
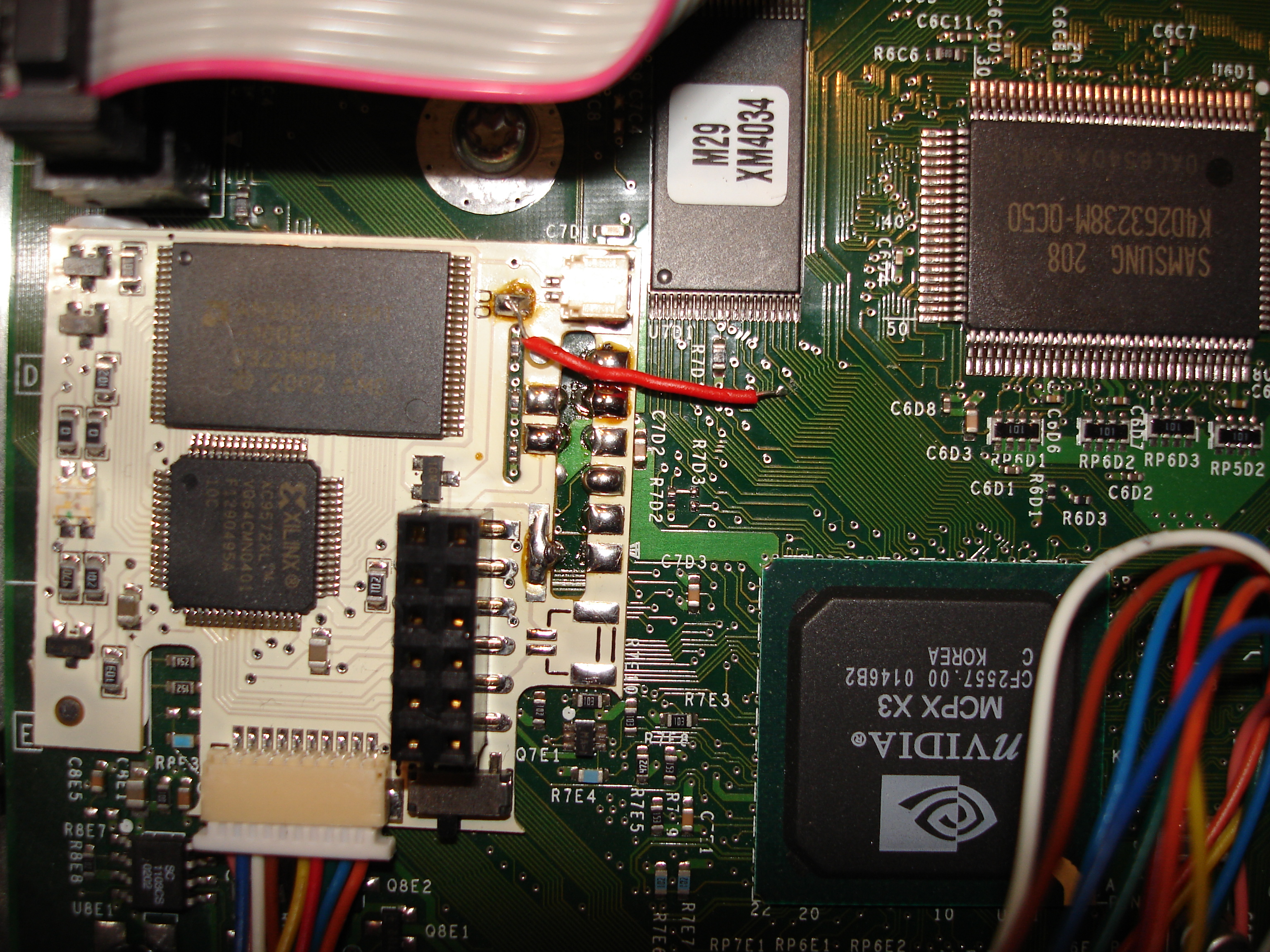
The motherboard of an original Xbox, with a Xenium ICE modchip installed

Modded consoles have been cited as an avenue for video game piracy, both by allowing unauthorized copies to be played, and by circumventing DRM. Legal homebrew video games and backup copies can be played on modified systems, but the argument of piracy remains. A notable example of console modding is the original Microsoft Xbox, of which tutorials still exist to this day. By introducing softmod installation files via one of the four controller ports, players could overhaul the system UI, install and play games directly off the internal hard disk drive, and even play TV shows and movies on the console. Some softmods even re-enable online play on the original Xbox, despite the first incarnation of Xbox Live having shut down in 2010. A handful of hardmod techniques also exist for the original Xbox, enabling hardware additions and upgrades to non-stock components.

Companies such as Nintendo have coordinated with law enforcement agencies to track down and seize modchips for their consoles, such as in the 2007 Operation Tangled Web. The same year, Nintendo also began a crackdown against merchants of R4 flash cartridges, which could be used to play pirated ROMs on the Nintendo DS. In 2009, the device was declared illegal to sell or import into Japan, among other countries. In 2018, a man was arrested in the United Kingdom, for allegedly running a Nintendo Switch modding operation out of his house. Furthermore, in 2020, two prominent members of the hacking group Team Xecuter were arrested and indicted by the Department of Justice. The indictment detailed their creation of modded consoles, which were "designed to be circumvention devices that had the purpose of allowing users to play pirated ROMs."

== See also ==
- Online piracy
