= Modding =

Customization of a product by the end user

Modding (from "modifying") is the act of modifying hardware, software, or anything else to perform a function not originally intended by the designer, or to achieve bespoke specification or appearance. The term is often used in reference to video game modding, particularly in regard to creating new or altered content and sharing that via the web. It may be applied to the overclocking of computers in order to increase the frequency at which the CPU operates. Case modding is a popular activity amongst many computer enthusiasts which involves the customization of a computer case or the installation of water cooling technology. In connection with automobiles, modding can connote engine tuning, remapping of a vehicle's engine control unit or customization of the coachwork.

== Computers and digital equipment ==
=== Legal issues ===
Modding may sometimes infringe the legal rights of the copyright owner. Some nations have laws prohibiting modding and accuse modders of attempting to overcome copy protection schemes. In the United States, the DMCA has set up stiff penalties for mods that violate the rights of intellectual property owners. In the European Union, member states have agreed the EU Copyright Directive and are transposing it into national law. A 22-year-old man was convicted by Caerphilly Magistrates' Court in the United Kingdom in July 2005 for selling a modded Xbox with built in software and games. However it is also worthy of note that some other European countries have not interpreted the legal issues in the same way. In Italy a judge threw out a Sony case saying it was up to owners of a console what they did with it. Similarly in Spain, mod chips have been ruled as legal despite the EU copyright legislation. Modding may be an unauthorized change made to a software or hardware to a platform in gaming. Case mods are modifications to a device with the altering of certain styles. For example, people who mod a Microsoft Xbox 360 can alter the LED lights on the controller to glow different colors.

On August 5, 2009, Matthew Crippen, a 27-year-old student at California State University, Fullerton, was arrested for modifying game consoles including the Xbox 360, PlayStation 3, and Nintendo Wii for profit. Crippen testified that it was so owners could play their backup discs of DRM-laden gaming software that they legally own. However, the DMCA states that it is illegal to circumvent copyright protection software, even for non-infringing uses such as backing up legally owned games. In December 2010 the prosecutors dropped all charges against Crippen because of inadmissible evidence obtained through an audio-less video recording deemed illegal by California law.

=== Video game consoles ===
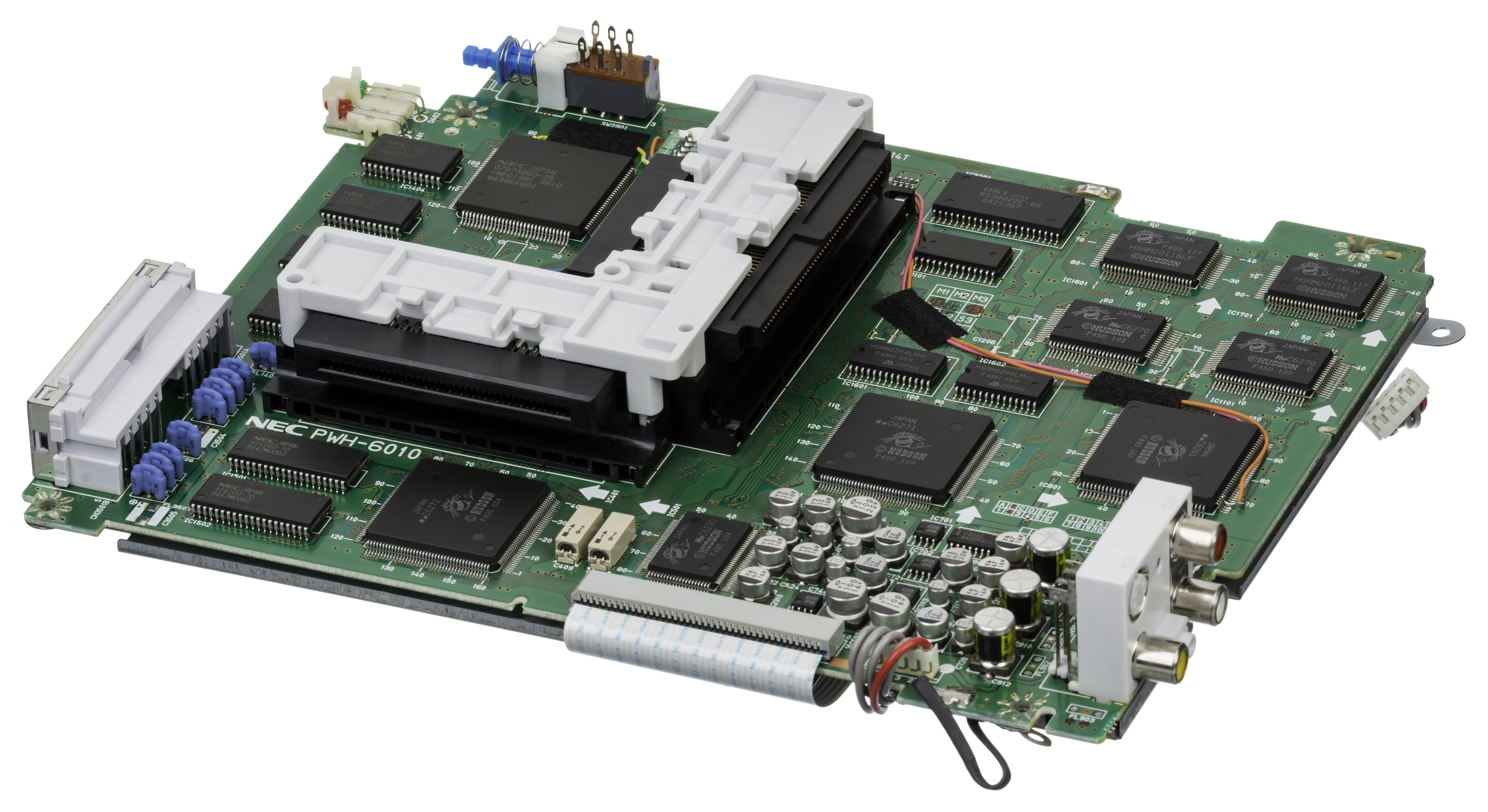
An NEC PC-FX motherboard with a modding chip

A common example of one kind of modding is video game console mod chips, which can allow users to play homemade games, games legitimately purchased in other regions, or legal backup copies, but can also allow illegal unauthorized copies by allowing the player to play personally recorded CD or DVD copies of video games. Modchips, in their current form, were first available for the Sony PlayStation (and later the PlayStation 2). Various other types of copyright circumvention systems also existed for the Nintendo 64 and the older Game Boy consoles (though neither include actual modding, but instead backup devices). Modding a console can also allow it to run games for other consoles, through emulation.

==== Types of modding ====
There are two different ways of running unsigned code on a game console. One is through soft modding (modifying software, normally using a softmod) to allow the user to change data contained on its hard drive in the case of the Xbox. Another type of modding, known as hard modding, is done by modifying the hardware, such as components connected to the Hypervisor in order to run exploits to the BIOS of the console or to run unsigned code and games. This form of 'modding' (more correctly termed as hacking), while not as popular as softmodding, is mostly done as it is able to 'run' many different types of software. Soft modding is more popular because of its ease of installation and its relatively low price (it can even be done for free with the right tools).

Another type of console modding is about appearances, much like computer case modification. Which includes, adding lights (most likely LEDS, cathodes or other electro-luminescent lighting). Cutting the game system case, to fit hardware and/or expose the internal systems. Cooling is a large part of console hard 'modding', including: heat sink upgrades, more powerful or quieter fans, some even go so far as to abandon common heat exchange to air all together by liquid cooling a console (most notably in the Xbox 360, which initially had some heat problems).

=== Game software ===
On the other side, some companies actively encourage modding of their products. In cases such as TiVo and Google, there has been an informal agreement between the modders and the company in which the modders agree not to do anything that destroys the company's business model and the company agrees to support the modding community by providing technical specifications and information. Some commercial video games thrive through a modding community. In the case of Half-Life and Warcraft III, mods called Counter-Strike and Defense of the Ancients (DotA) respectively, drove sales of the original software for years.

=== Device drivers ===
Modded drivers are made for improved performance which official versions of drivers do not offer or in cases where there are no official versions of drivers for new hardware designed for older operating systems such as Windows 98.

=== Computer hardware ===
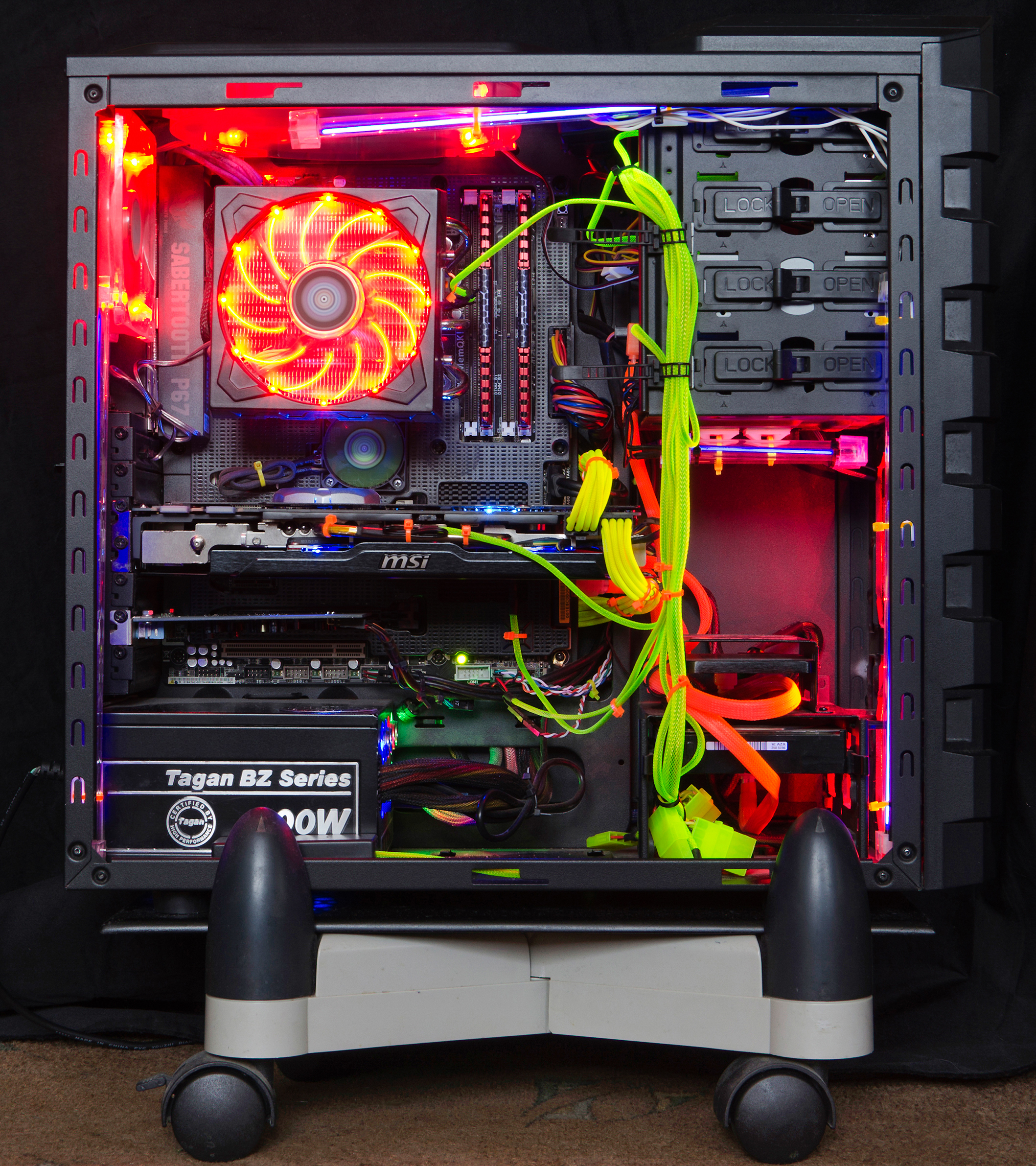
A desktop computer modded to have wires that fluoresce under UV light

Case modding may range from simple case (or chassis) painting, to extensive case modifications with custom-fabricated pieces. The terms modding and modder have expanded to encompass a broad range of customization by personal-computer enthusiasts, especially in gaming PCs, including: custom and homemade hard- and soft-line liquid cooling loops; installation of LED strips and other lighting effects; replacement of stock cooling fans with high-performance ones (on CPU coolers, power supplies, cases, drive bays, and other components); "delidding" of CPUs and GPUs to replace their stock thermal paste and pads with high-thermal-conductivity ones; addition of individually sleeved (and often color-coordinated) cabling; replacement of various heat sinks with custom liquid-cooling water blocks on components normally air-cooled (e.g. RAM, GPUs, and SSDs); addition of new components not usually found in PCs, such as electronic timers or temperature and humidity alarms; custom soldering to replace or change the behavior of components; expansion of the motherboard's capabilities with PCIe add-in cards and risers (the latter also used to mount graphics cards sideways to show them off better); addition of server hardware into a consumer-grade system; and extensive overclocking through detailed benchmarking that seeks to squeeze out every last percentage of performance improvement without the system becoming unstable.

== Cars and vehicles ==
=== Orthopedic ===
Ortho-modding is the car adaptation (seats, pedals, etc.) to help drivers to prevent, correct and diminish light orthopedic and backbone/spine problems.

=== Eco-modding ===
Eco-modding is the reduction of drag, petroleum car adaptation to use renewable energy (generally, changing or adding a new engine or motor), generally hydrogen or electricity. See hybrid car. Occasionally, it has been known to run a Diesel engine on plant and animal oils. See Biodiesel.

=== Performance tuning ===
Car and engine tuning are modification of a car for enhanced performance, in engine power output, handling, aerodynamics, or cosmetic purposes. See also Category:Vehicle modification.

== Industrial machines ==
Factories get rather expensive machines that are used to mass-produce specialized parts. These machines can be altered to make parts other than how the manufacturers of the machines designed or intended them. The legality of doing this depends on who owns the machines, and whether the agreement, that supplied the machines to the factories, said anything about this, and what the laws are in the nation where this is being done.

For example, the machines might be leased from the manufacturer of the machines. If they are ever to be returned, they need to go back in the same kind of condition and engineering shape as when they were first delivered. There is an annual physical inventory to make sure the factory has everything that they are leasing. This audit might be done by representatives of the leasing company, who are looking to see recognizable machines, that match their models and safety rules.

== Pens ==
Pen-modding is the act of combining many pen parts either to help with pen spinning, in which a perfect balance is desired to create an ideal spinning pen, or simply for decoration. These pen mods can either be made by combining parts from different pens and/or mechanical pencils, or by buying modded pens online. In some cases, pen mods can exceed over $30–40 USD per pen.

== See also ==
- Body modification
- DIY audio Audio equipment modifications and construction.
- Firearm modification
- Hackerspace
- Holga An inexpensive brand of medium-format cameras that are often modded in numerous ways by their owners.
- Homebrew
- Modular design
- Video game art
