= Game development kit =

Kits that ease video game development

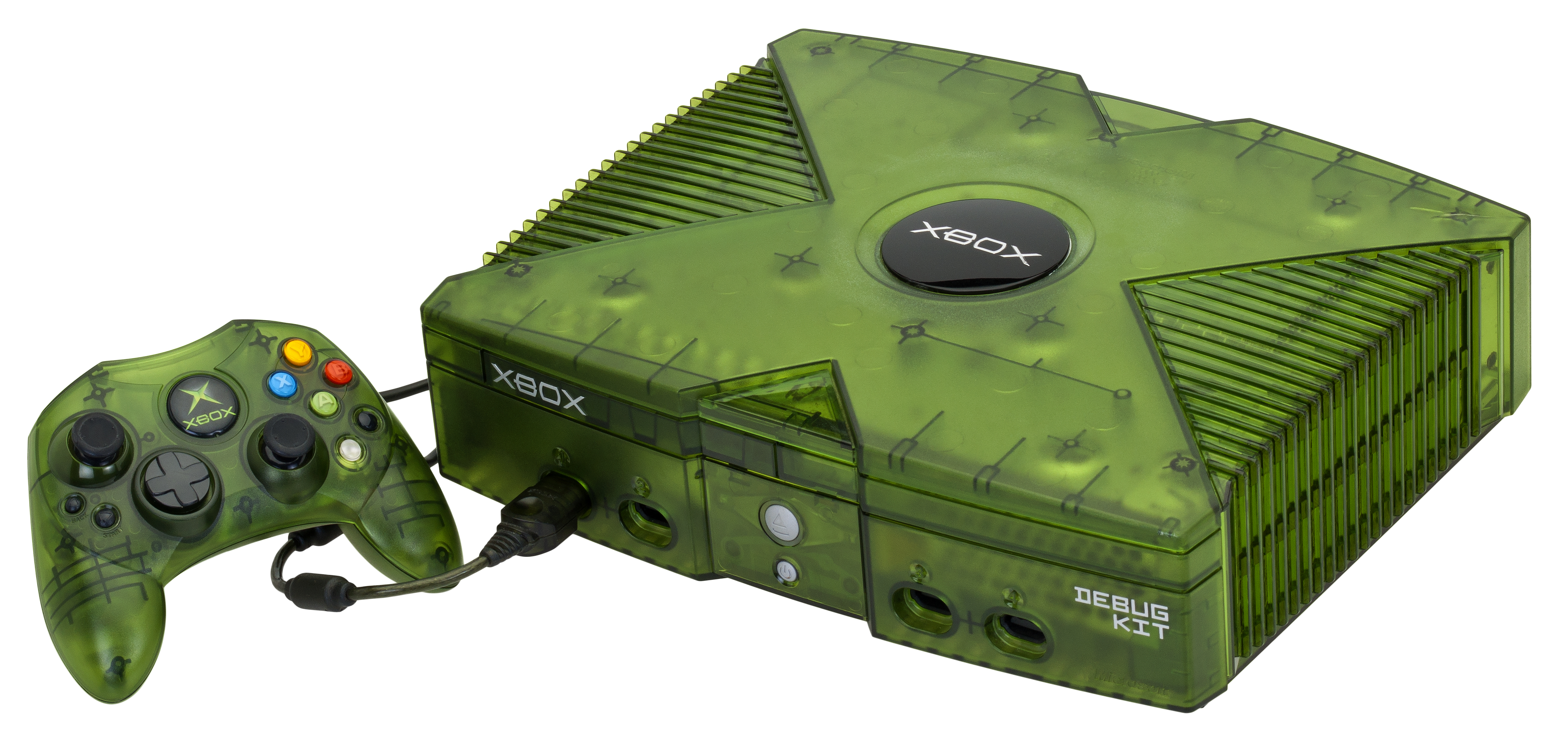
An Xbox Debug Kit, intended for game developers on porting PC games to the Xbox.

Game development kits (GDK) are specialized hardware and software used to create commercial video games for game consoles. They may be partnered with game development tools, special game engine licenses, and other middleware to aid video game development. GDKs are typically not available to the public, and require game developers to enter an agreement, partnership, or program with the hardware manufacturer to gain access to the hardware. As console generations pass, development kits often get sold through websites like eBay without repercussions. This is often because the console manufacturers discontinue certain development programs as time passes.

== Overview ==
In the 1980s, computing did not involve 3D modelling or any complex programming due to the limitations of hardware. This, combined with the hobbyist nature of early computer game programming, meant that not many individuals or smaller companies would develop for consoles. Even when consoles became mainstream (such as the Nintendo Entertainment System), there was no official or publicly available GDK since most console manufacturers would develop their games in-house. For example, Nintendo had internal development teams for both hardware and software.

By the fifth generation of consoles, game development kits were developed to encourage more developers to make console games and grow the videogame industry. Game development kits began as a simple way for developers to connect their computers to console hardware, allowing them to compile software on their PC and see it play directly on a console. Once most GDKs started becoming bundled with hardware-specific software, hobbyists or anyone not directly affiliated with a console manufacturer would have to write their games without the specialized software to access unique features such as the Xbox One's Kinect or the Wii U GamePad.

Modern game development kits often come bundled with the specialized software, and are much more formalized compared to previous-generation GDKs. In older generations of console gaming, developers had to make their own hardware and write games at various levels of programming (such as assembly). Today, programs such as Unity 3D provide a complete software environment and console manufacturers such as Nintendo provide polished & powerful development hardware through their developer programs. Other console manufacturers even allow the retail consoles to be used as development kits, provided that the development software is being used by the developer.

== Third generation ==
=== Nintendo Entertainment System ===
For a significant portion of the NES lifespan, there was no official development kit. Video game developers creating games for the NES would have to make their own development kits, such as Rocket Science Production with their "NES Mission Control" development system. At least two programs were used in conjunction with the NES Mission Control hardware; NESTEST.EXE which would be used to test and debug the development hardware, and HST.EXE which would be used for communication between a computer and the NES development hardware.

== Fourth generation ==
=== Super Nintendo Entertainment System ===
The Super Nintendo Entertainment System used specialized EPROM cartridges for development, as well as various software. Similar to the NES, developers often made their own development software or relied on middleware made by other developers.

== Fifth generation ==
=== PlayStation ===
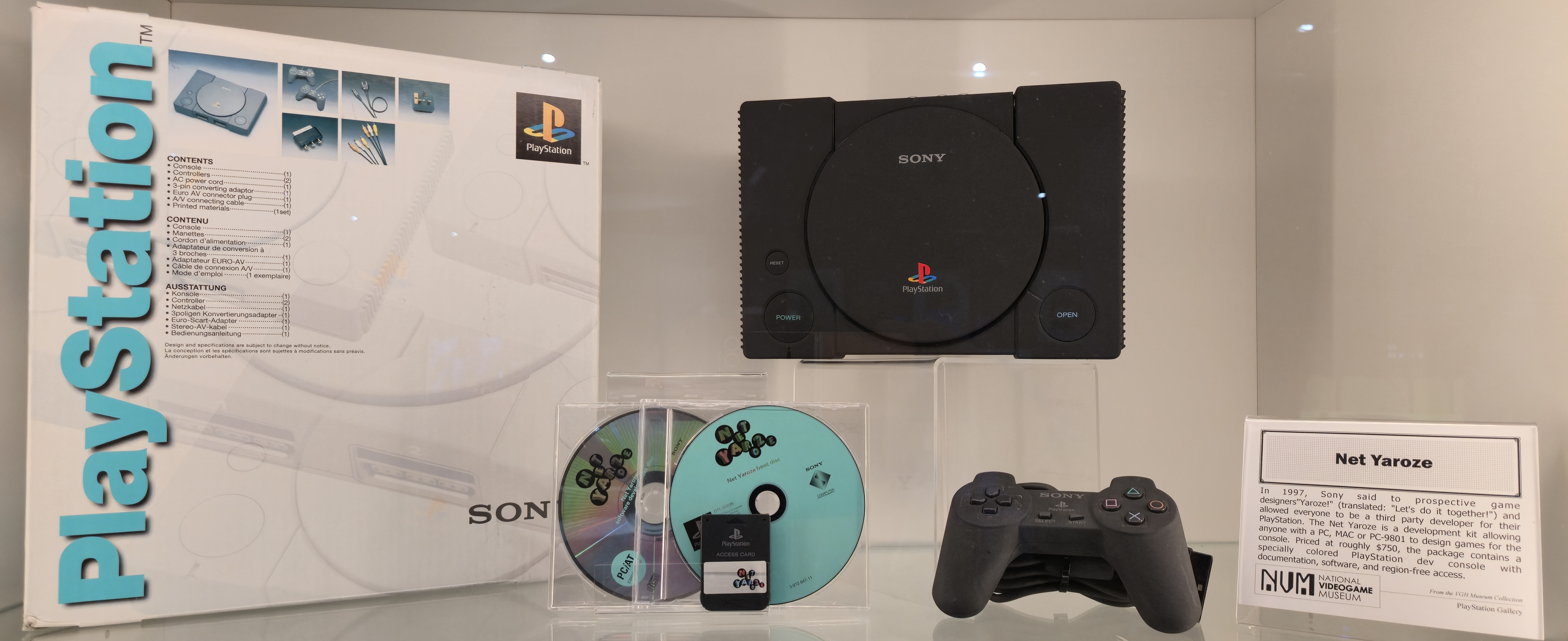
A 1997 Net Yaroze Development Kit, on display at the National Videogame Museum in Frisco, Texas

There are several variations of the PlayStation development kit used for game creation. One variation of the development kit had only three components, while the PlayStation Ultimate Development Kit included up to 26 components, including the complete Net Yaroze development kit.

The Net Yaroze version of the development kit was unique in that it had some features removed and added compared to the official (complete) PlayStation development kit. The Net Yaroze hardware was designed for hobbyists, while official developers would have access to the official PlayStation development kits. There was also a blue version of the PlayStation made for developers that would read burned discs to allow quick testing of imaged builds of their videogames. While there were official PlayStation-branded CD-Rs that could be used with the blue PlayStation, regular CD-Rs were also compatible with the system.

=== Nintendo 64/64DD ===
The Nintendo 64 development kit consisted of multiple components, both for the N64 and its add-on, the N64DD. The main hardware used in N64 game development was the Partner-N64 Development Kit, and used tall cartridges for game development/testing rather than the short cartridges that were sold with retail games. Another hardware component in N64 development was the NU64 Flash Gang Writer, which allowed developers to copy data from one cartridge to multiple cartridges simultaneously. This device was primarily used to create press and test copies of games, and also relied on tall cartridges instead of short retail cartridges.

Other versions of the Nintendo 64 GDK are the SN Systems development suite, as well as the SN Maestro 64 Music development system. The development suite allowed developers to run code from a computer directly to the console, and included a software package. The Maestro 64 Music system allowed developers to load music software on to the console, and play music through the Nintendo 64's hardware. another unofficial alternative to develop games for the N64 was the Doctor V64, made by Bung Enterprises.

== Sixth generation ==
=== Dreamcast ===
Sega Dreamcast units were unique in that they used GD-ROM discs; giga discs that held 1GB of data. This was slightly more than a typical CD, but less than a DVD. While GD-ROM burners were used by some developers, since the Dreamcast was compatible with CDs and since most games didn't take up 1GB of data at the time, GD-ROMs remained uncommon as developers opted to use the more-easily accessible CDs for their disc media. The console itself was white, like the retail version of the Dreamcast console, but unlike the retail console, the dev kit console looked like a typical desktop PC from the 1990s but shorter in height. The boot up screen of the dev kit console is also different, as it uses 3D graphics instead of the 2D graphics used in the retail console.

=== PlayStation 2 ===
The dev kit console for the PS2 looked like a retail PS2, but substantially thicker.

=== GameCube ===
GameCube NPDP-GDEV

The GameCube dev kit (NPDP-GDEV) appears significantly different than a retail GameCube, which the unit having a dolphin icon, in reference to the codename of the GameCube being "Dolphin". It ran on an Orca board, which was a very early prototype board used in game development. Interestingly, the NPDP-GDEV ran games on NPDP cartridges rather than the more known GameCube Game Disc and DPI switches that are able to change the region (PAL/NTSC-J). The dev kit was able to store up to 3 games simultaneously, with a button in the triggering a light that would glow, determining which one of the three games were selected.

=== Xbox ===
When developers were creating software for the original Xbox, a prototype of the controller was used in the early development kits. This controller was slimmer, had elongated sides, and used a USB cable instead of an Xbox port-compatible cable. The dev kit console was shaped like a tower desktop PC, was grey colored and had a green circle in the middle of the front of the console with an X inside the circle.

== Seventh generation ==
=== Xbox 360 ===
Microsoft manages the Xbox 360 Tools and Middleware Program, which licenses development kits (hardware and software) to professional software developers working on tools and technologies for games. Access to this program requires good industry references, prior experience in games tools and middleware development, and signing a non-disclosure agreement.

=== PlayStation 3 ===
The PlayStation developer program allows registered developers to publish their games across the PlayStation Network, making their games accessible on the PlayStation 3, PlayStation 4, PlayStation Vita, and PlayStation TV all through one program.

=== Wii ===
The Wii development kit was a bundle of the "NDEV" hardware – a big black box full of debugging/testing hardware bearing little resemblance to the official consumer release – and a disc containing the developer software tools.

== Eighth generation ==
=== Xbox One ===
Microsoft maintains multiple developer programs for people wanting to develop games for their platforms; ID@Xbox for Xbox One game development, and the Windows Dev Center for Windows 8, Windows 8.1, Windows 10, and Xbox One game and application development.

- The ID@Xbox program allows qualified game developers to self-publish their games to the Xbox One, as well as access free middleware and use two development hardware kits for free.
- The Windows Dev Center allows developers to create apps and games on Windows 8, Windows 8.1, and Windows 10 platforms as part of the Universal Windows Platform system.

=== PlayStation 4 and PlayStation Vita ===
The PlayStation developer program allows registered developers to publish their games across the PlayStation Network, making their games accessible on the PlayStation 3, PlayStation 4, PlayStation Vita, and PlayStation TV all through one program. The PlayStation 4 development kits were known as "Orbis", though this was just a codename. Academic institutions can register to receive PS4 development kits for educational use, and are not region-restricted unlike regular PlayStation Developer Program members.

=== Wii U ===
Nintendo maintained a unified developer program for both its Wii U and Nintendo 3DS families of platforms. This developer program provided software and middleware to developers, and allowed developers to self-publish their games to the Nintendo eShop. Games and applications published through this program are considered "third-party" and do not belong to Nintendo, allowing independent developers to publish their games on multiple different platforms. This service ended alongside the closure of the Wii U and 3DS eShops on the 27 March 2023.

The Wii U development hardware consists of a system called "CAT-DEV", with its accompanying peripherals such as the Display Remote Controller (presumably the Wii U GamePad) and sensor bar.

=== Nintendo 3DS Family ===
Nintendo's developer program allows developers to use Nintendo 3DS development kits, and allows developers to self-publish their games to the Nintendo eShop. As mentioned in the Nintendo Wii U section above, games and applications published through this program are considered "third-party" and do not belong to Nintendo, allowing independent developers to publish their games on multiple different platforms.

== Ninth generation ==
=== Xbox Series ===
Development kits for the Xbox Series X were released to developers in 2020. The device included support for loading software via USB-C and 10 Gigabit Ethernet to reduce development bottlenecks, programmable exterior buttons for debugging options (e.g., displaying a game's real-time frame rate on-screen), and a built-in LCD screen for displaying diagnostic information. Its hardware featured an 8-core AMD Zen 2-architecture CPU, an RDNA GPU with 56 Compute Units, and 40 GB of onboard RAM (compared to the consumer console's 16 GB). It had the physical appearance of an Xbox One X development kit.
