= Game backup device =

Device for backing up ROM information from a video game cartridge

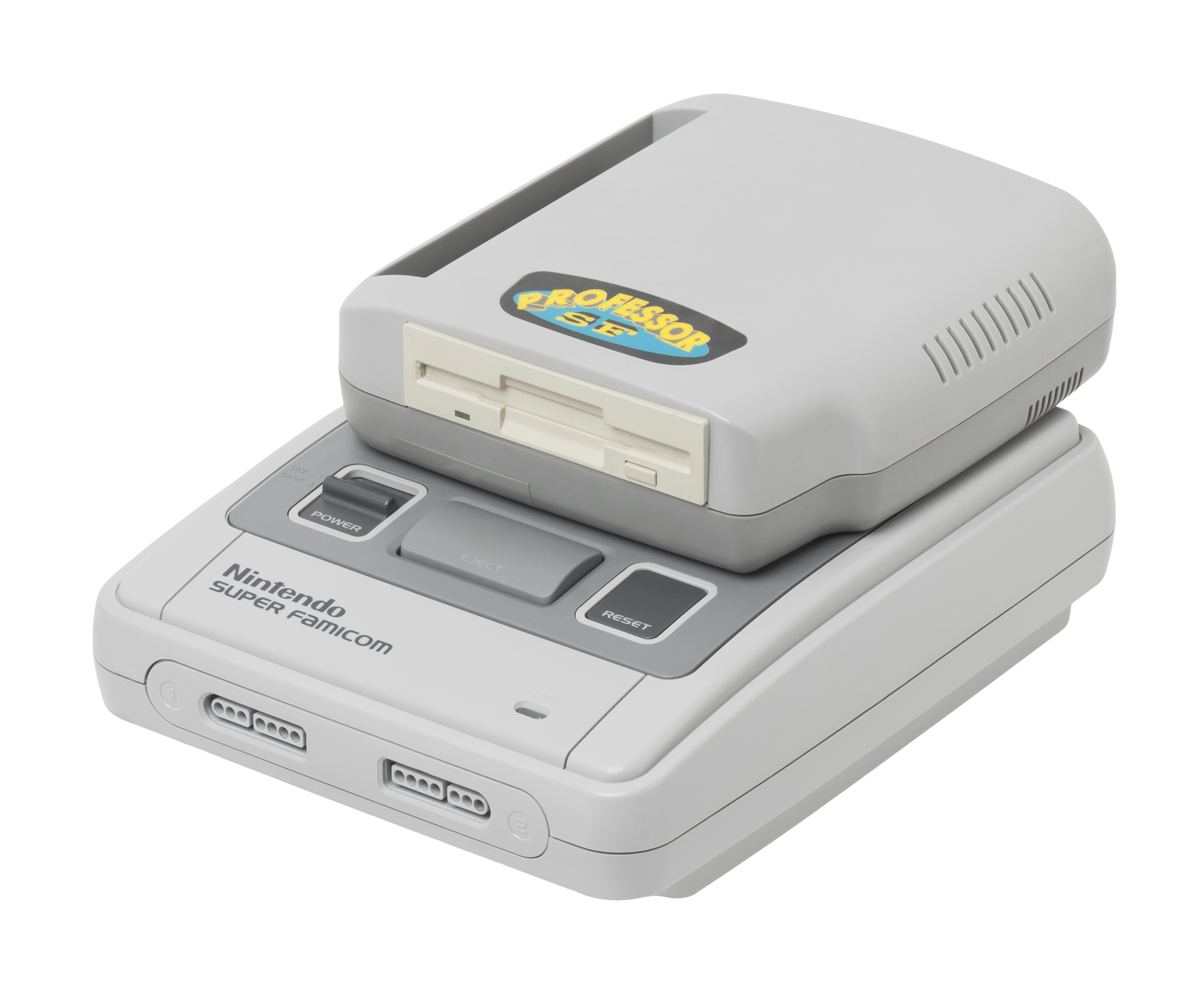
The Professor SF is a backup device for the Super Famicom and allows for saving games to floppy disks.

A game backup device, informally called a copier, is a device for backing up ROM data from a video game cartridge to a computer file called a ROM image and playing them back on the official hardware. Recently flash cartridges, especially on the Game Boy Advance and Nintendo DS platforms, only support the latter function; they cannot be used for backing up ROM data. Game backup devices also make it possible to develop homebrew software on video game systems. Some can also backup save data. Game backup devices differ from modchips in that modchips are used in conjunction with systems that use generally available media such as CDs and DVDs, whereas game backup devices are used with systems that use cartridges.

Video game companies consider these devices as a tool for reverse engineering to facilitate copyright infringement. Most of the devices are made in China, but they are available globally. Recently, legal action has been taken by companies such as Nintendo to remove these devices from the marketplace, but the easy dissemination of information and selling of products over the Internet has made it difficult to eradicate this problem. Hobbyists argue that these devices are legal and shouldn't be illegal because they fulfill the need to back up games in case the original is illegally sold or lost; and because they permit the private development of new software on the device.

In Japan, these devices are known as magicom (マジコン; "magic computer"), an umbrella term for any device that enables backups on game consoles.

== History ==
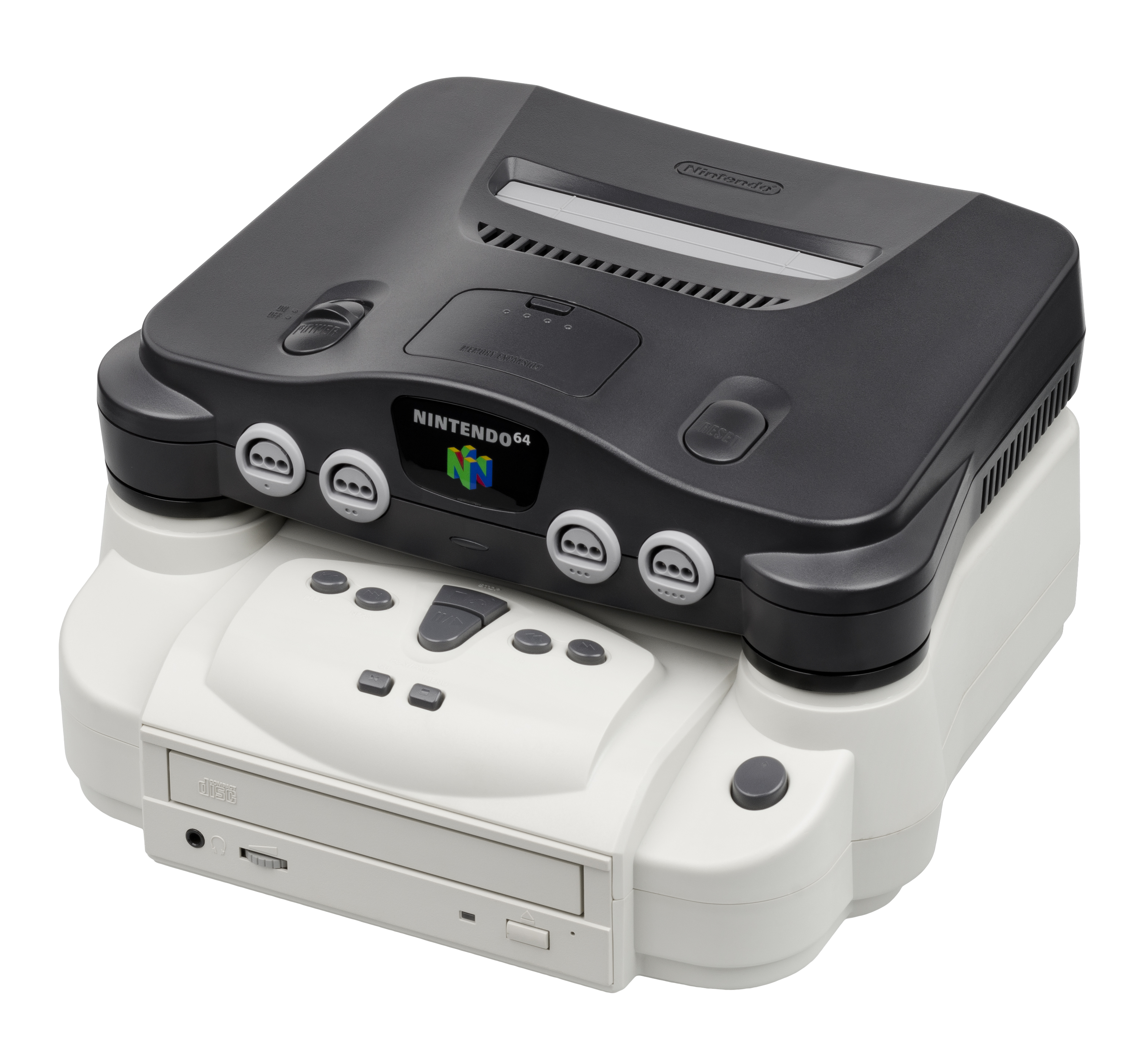
Doctor V64 installed in a Nintendo 64.

The spiritual forefather of copier devices can be traced back to the Famicom Disk System, an official add-on device for the Family Computer. Users quickly discovered ways to copy these disks with ordinary home computers of the time and transmit the copied data to others using the emerging electronic bulletin board systems. Nintendo attempted to counter piracy by slightly modifying the hardware in newer revisions, but they were unable to stop the unauthorized copying. Later, the Famicom Disk System was discontinued, supposedly because cartridge technology had caught up in capacity, but the influence of rampant piracy cannot be discounted.

When the Super Nintendo Entertainment System was released, Hong Kong based companies developed products with similar functionality. They produced cartridges that fit in the video game console's cartridge slot but were interfaced with a floppy disk drive through a connecting cable. The copier, as they were called, also had a passthrough slot into which a real game could be inserted. The device, once powered up, could be used to copy the cartridge's ROM data into files on ordinary MS-DOS formatted 3.5" floppy disks and thereafter to play the game from the same disks, without having to rely on the original cartridge being present.

When these devices were introduced to the United States and Europe, video game enthusiasts quickly started swapping the copied games over bulletin board systems. Release groups formed to cater to the need of fresh games, and also to crack the protection that was employed to thwart copying in several games released after copiers became available. Release groups would also add their own intros to games, to advertise their BBSes and new releases, and sometimes include a trainer to optionally start on later stages or with more lives.

The copier devices and dissemination of hardware information through BBSes made it possible to start developing software on the video game consoles. The software evolved from crack intros to demos, and finally to home-made games. The homebrew software development scene is still active on multiple contemporary platforms.

The availability of such ROM binary dumps also allowed the birth of video game console emulators.

== Legality ==
Similar to modchips, the legality of these methods is disputed. While they are often advertised for their ability to make legal backups and to be used to play legal homebrew software and are considered a cheap method of development compared to purchasing official development kits, a backup device's potential for software piracy is a major concern to hardware and software manufacturers.

Companies such as Nintendo have fought long legal battles against companies like Bung Enterprises and the makers of the R4DS on the grounds that their products are used primarily for piracy and qualify as theft.

== Backup devices for consoles ==
=== Super Nintendo Entertainment System ===
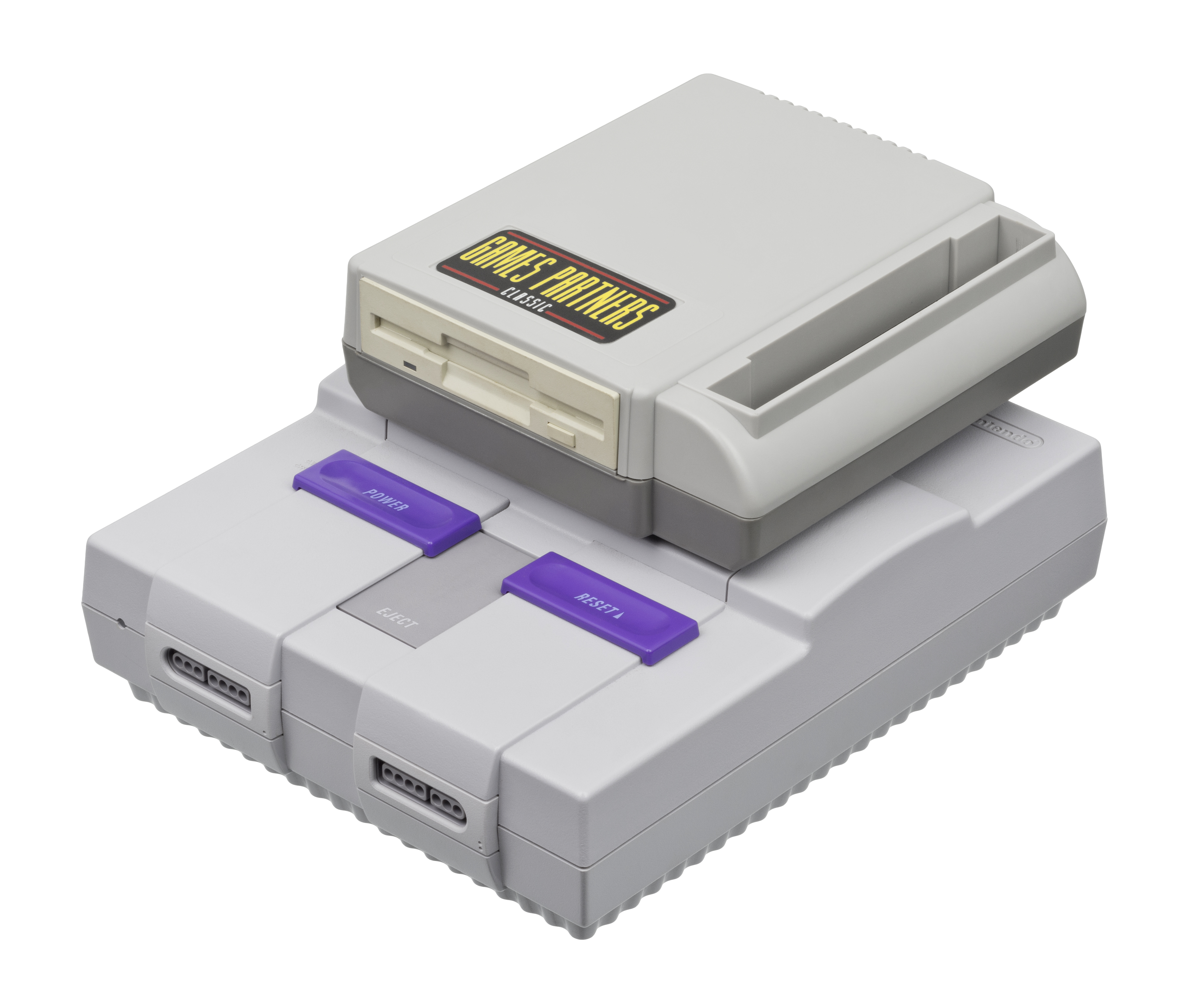
The Game Partners Classic, made by Bung for the Super NES Control Deck

16-bit game backup devices using floppy disks or USB.

- Super Magicom (8 or 16 Megabits) – by Front Fareast Industrial & programming / Firmware by Neil Gossage of S.N. Software Ltd. in the UK (who was also the European & North American Distributor for them), model MS-3201. Included an external 3.5" floppy drive and integrated parallel port. File format is *.SMC; for multi-disk images, *.SMC followed by *.001, *.002, .... The device that started the trend of calling game backup devices magicoms in Japan.
- Super Wild Card series (same as the Super Magicom but had an integrated 3.5" Floppy Drive – by Front Fareast Industrial & programming / Firmware by Neil Gossage of S.N. Software Ltd. in the UK (who was also the European & North American Distributor for them). File format extension is *.SMC or *.SWC; for multi-disk images, *.SMC followed by *.001, *.002, .... Available in several variations, all of which include an integrated 3.5" floppy drive for IBM-PC formatted disks, Neil Gossage of S.N. Software Ltd. also wrote a program called PCHD which allowed you to format and read the disk to 800k or 1.6mb., as well as parallel port:
  - Super Wild Card DX 32 (32 Megabits) (a.k.a. SWC DX/32 or SWC DX32), model number SWC3201DX
  - Super Wild Card DX2 (32 or 64 Megabits) (a.k.a. SWC DX2), model number SWC3201DX2. Expandable to 96 Megabits and supports alternate media such as a CD-ROM or Zip 100 MB drive via IEEE 1284 interface. This model of unit is known to have several hardware or firmware bugs.
- Super UFO Series – by UFO Enterprise. Available from 16 to 32 Megabits. Compatible with Pro Fighter and Game Doctor file formats. File format extension is *.1GM, *.2GM, ..., *.8GM.
- Game Doctor Series – by Bung Enterprise. Available up to 64 Megabits (and upgradable to 128 Megabits) with optional Digital Signal Processor cartridge to run games like Pilot Wings, Super Mario Kart, and many others. File format extension is *.078.
- Multi Game Hunter (MGH) by Venus Corp. A dual solution game copier for both Sega Genesis and SNES.
- Double Pro Fighter by China Coach Limited is a dual solution game copier for both Sega Genesis and SNES.
- Retrode by Retrode UG is a USB interface for both Sega Genesis and SNES cartridges and controllers. It can be extended via so-called plug-in adapters to accommodate games for other systems as well.

No commercially produced Backup Device for Super NES can play back games which use additional processing hardware in the cartridge, with the sole exception of DSP-1. This is due in part to the way in which these processors operate. It may be possible with some copiers to manage to back up a game using an extra coprocessor chip though. A relatively small number of games fall into this category, but there are notable games included, for example Mega Man X2, Mega Man X3, Star Fox, Kirby's Dream Land 3, Super Mario RPG, and Super Mario World 2: Yoshi's Island.

=== Nintendo 64 ===
There are two devices for the Nintendo 64 that plug into the extension port on the bottom of the system, initially intended for the 64DD: the Doctor V64 and the CD64. In addition to playing backups from a CD, they can both be used to create them by copying the information from a cartridge that is plugged into the Nintendo 64. They store the ROM image in internal memory and can be transferred to a computer via a parallel port for distribution elsewhere. The Z64 uses the cartridge slot on the top of the N64 and has a cartridge slot itself for booting backups as well as making backups. It reads from and stores backups on zip diskettes. The NEO N64 Myth Cart was released in December 2009, long after the Nintendo 64 had been discontinued, and is marketed for retro gamers. The NEO N64 Myth Cart connects to a PC using USB, and ROM images are stored in flash memory.

Schematics, PCB designs and source code for a cartridge emulator known as "PVBackup" were released by Valery Pudov.

Modern day devices include the Everdrive 64 and the 64drive. The Everdrive loads ROM images from either USB or from an SD card inserted into the top of the cartridge. The 64Drive also uses USB but can also load games from either SD card or CompactFlash card. Both units require a CIC chip soldering into the board and the plastic casing from a donor cartridge. Neither unit has the ability to backup cartridges. Users can however backup cartridges using a device called Retrode, a USB powered device that installs itself as a mass storage device in Windows, allowing the cartridge information to be backed up.

== Backup devices for handhelds ==
=== Game Boy ===
For the original Game Boy and its color successor there are numerous external copiers, such as GB Xchanger, which can back up an inserted Game Boy or Game Boy Color cartridge. The GB Xchanger plugs into a computer in order to copy the games, which can later transfer the game(s) back through the copier to a blank flash cartridge.

=== Game Boy Advance ===
Early copiers for the Game Boy Advance, Game Boy Advance SP, and Game Boy Micro, like the Flash Advance Xtreme are similar to those used for the original Game Boy, as they are external copiers that use parallel ports to communicate with personal computers.

The copiers eventually made use of USB with products like first generation XG-Flash carts, which also used external copiers, but benefited from faster write speeds than its parallel port predecessors. This technology evolved into onboard external copiers like the EZFlash Advance that used the Game Boy Advance itself as a copier. These USB cables would plug into the GBA's proprietary port used for Game Link Cables or accessories like the e-Reader and when booted while holding Start and Select, would connect to a PC. These versions are not compatible with the Game Boy Micro because it uses a different port than the GBA and GBA SP.

=== Nintendo DS and 3DS ===
There are not any commercial backup devices for the Nintendo DS and Nintendo 3DS that are widely available, yet many devices exist to play backups on a DS or 3DS. These flashcarts are capable of using specific software to backup both DS and 3DS or Game Boy Advance games. There is the possibility to create backups using a 3DS with custom firmware (with DS and 3DS).

=== Other handhelds ===
Bung released a copier for the Neo Geo Pocket and the Neo Geo Pocket Color. It resembled their GB Xchanger and it served the same function.

A copier for the Japan-only handheld, the Wonderswan, as well as the Wonderswan Color and to a lesser extent, the SwanCrystal, was released called the WonderMagic. It uses a parallel port for communication with a PC.

== See also ==
- Modchip
