= Doctor V64 =

Development and backup device made for the Nintendo 64

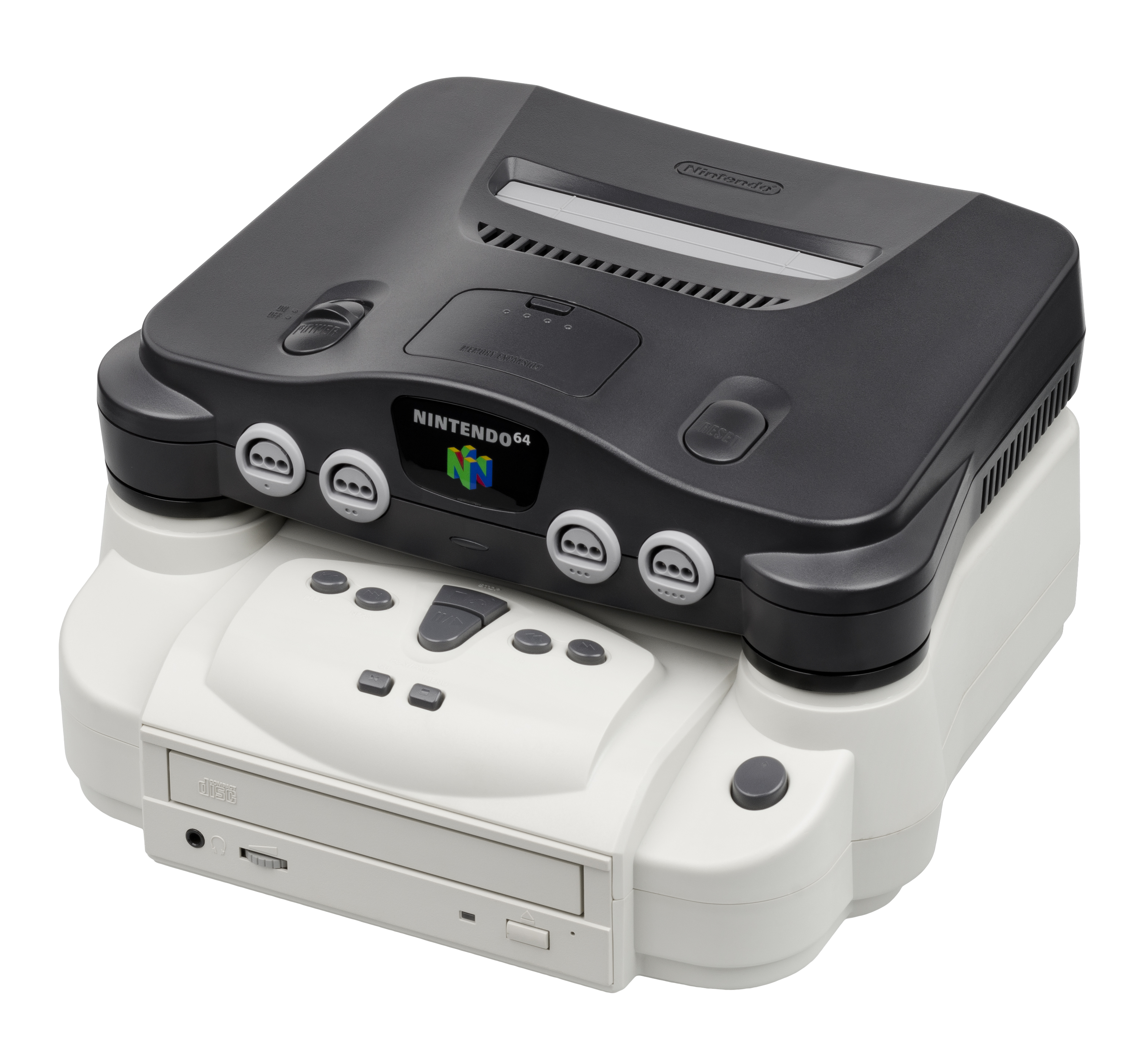
The Doctor V64 attached to an N64

The Doctor V64 (also referred to simply as the V64) is a development and backup device made by Bung Enterprises Ltd that is used in conjunction with the Nintendo 64. The Doctor V64 also had the ability to play video CDs and audio CDs. Additionally, it could apply stereo 3D effects to the audio.

== History ==
The V64 was released in 1996 and was priced around US$450. It was one of the first commercially available backup devices for the Nintendo 64, appearing not long after the console's international release. The Partner-N64 development kit, which was manufactured by Kyoto Microcomputer Co., Ltd. and sold officially by Nintendo, was a comparatively expensive development machine. The V64 served as a lower-cost development machine, though its unofficial status would later lead to conflict with Nintendo. Some third-party developers used a number of V64s in their development process, with games such as Turok: Dinosaur Hunter utilizing the device during development.

=== Specifications ===
The CPU of the V64 is a 6502, and the operating system is contained in a BIOS.

The V64 unit contains a CD-ROM drive which sits underneath the Nintendo 64 and plugs into the expansion slot on the underside of the Nintendo 64. The expansion slot is essentially a mirror image of the cartridge slot on the top of the unit, with the same electrical connections; thus, the Nintendo 64 reads data from the Doctor V64 in the same manner as it would from a cartridge plugged into the normal slot.

== Usage ==
=== Game booting ===
In order to get around Nintendo's lockout chip, when using the V64, a game cartridge is plugged into the Nintendo 64 through an adapter which connects only the lockout chip. The game cart used for the operation had to contain the same lockout chip used by the game back up.

=== Saving game progress ===
The second problem concerned saving progress. Most N64 games are saved to the cart itself instead of external memory cards. If the player wanted to keep their progress, then the cartridge used had to have the same type of non-volatile memory hardware. Alternatively, Bung produced the "DX256" and "DS1" add-ons to allow (EEPROM and SRAM respectively) saves to be made without using the inserted cartridge. These devices were inserted into the top-slot of the N64 with the game cartridge being then inserted into the top of them to just provide the security bypass. Save slots on the DX256 were selected using an alpha and numeric encoder knobs on the front of the device.

=== Uploading game images ===
The Doctor V64 could be used to read the data from a game cartridge and transfer the data to a PC via the parallel port. This allowed developers and homebrew programmers to upload their game images to the Doctor V64 without having to create a CD backup each time. It also allowed users to upload game images taken from the Internet.

== Doctor V64 Jr. ==
Following the Doctor V64's success, Bung released the Doctor V64 Jr. in December 1998. This was a condensed, cost-efficient version of the original V64. The Doctor V64 Jr. has no CD drive and plugs into the normal cartridge slot on the top of the Nintendo 64. Data is loaded into the Doctor V64 Jr.'s battery-backed RAM from a PC via a parallel port connection. The Doctor V64 Jr. has up to 512 megabits (64 MB) of memory storage. This was done to provide for future Nintendo 64 carts that employed larger memory storage, but the high costs associated with ordering large storage carts kept this occurrence at a minimum. Only a handful of 512-megabit games were released for the Nintendo 64 system.

== Promotions ==
In 1998 and 1999, there was a homebrew competition known as "Presence of Mind" (POM), an N64 demo competition led by dextrose.com. The contest consisted of submitting a user-developed N64 program, game, or utility. Bung Enterprises promoted the event and supplied prizes (usually Doctor V64 related accessories). Though a contest was planned for 2000, the interest in the N64 was already fading, and so did the event. POM contest demo entries can still be found on the Internet.

== Legal issues ==
=== Role in piracy ===
The Doctor V64 unit was the first commercially available backup device for the Nintendo 64 unit. Though the unit was sold as a development machine, it could be modified to enable the creation and use of commercial game backups. Unlike official development units, the purchase of V64s was not restricted to software companies only. For this reason, the unit became a popular choice among those looking to proliferate unlicensed copies of games.

Original Doctor V64 units sold by Bung did not allow the playing of backups. A person would have to modify the unit by themselves in order to make it backup friendly. This usually required a user to download and install a modified Doctor V64 BIOS. Additionally, the cartridge adapter had to be opened and soldered in order to allow for the operational procedure. Though Bung never sold backup enabled V64s, many re-sellers would modify the units themselves.

=== Conflicts with Nintendo ===
During the N64's lifetime, Nintendo revised the N64's model, making the serial port area smaller. This slight change in the N64's plastic casing made the connection to the Doctor V64 difficult to achieve without user modification. This revision may have been a direct reaction from Nintendo to discourage the use of V64 devices, and may also explain why Bung decided to discontinue the use of this port in the later Doctor V64 Jr. models.

Nintendo made many legal efforts worldwide in order to stop the sale of Doctor V64 units. They sued Bung directly as well as specific store retailers in Europe and North America for copyright infringement. Eventually, Nintendo managed to have the courts prohibit the sale of Doctor V64 units in the United States.

== Main menu ==
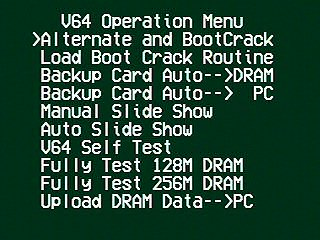
V64 menu screen

The Doctor V64 implemented text-based menu-driven screens. The menus consisted of white text superimposed over a black background. Utilizing the buttons on the V64 unit, a user would navigate the menus and issue commands. Though the menu was mainly designed for game developers, it is possible to back up cartridges with it (through the use of an unofficial V64 BIOS). Some of the menu items related to game backups were removed from the V64's BIOS near the end of its life due to pressure from Nintendo. These items are only available by obtaining a patched V64 BIOS.

Complete V64 menu listing
Menu option	Effect
Alternate and BootCrack	This option would load a workaround for booting games. It only worked on certain types of game images.
Load Boot Crack Routine	An advanced option that allowed uploading of program code for the use of boot related problems.
Backup Card Auto → DRAM	This option would read a game cartridge and store it in the V64's RAM.
Backup Card Auto → PC	Same as the previous option, but would transfer the data to a PC through the V64's parallel port.
Manual Slide Show	Switch manual between Screenshots the user made in VCD Movie.
Auto Slide Show	Switch automatic between Screenshots the user made in VCD Movie.
V64 Self Test	Diagnostics routine; would check all of V64's subsystems.
Fully Test 128M DRAM	Diagnostics routine; would check only the first 128Mb of memory.
Fully Test 256M DRAM	Diagnostics routine; specifically for units with 256Mb of memory.
Upload DRAM Data → PC	Used in conjunction with the option "Backup Card Auto → DRAM", this option would transfer the contents of Doctor V64's RAM to a PC through the use of V64's parallel port.
Fix CRC Code → run game	Another boot-related command to enable the playing of game images. It would only work on certain types of backups.
Show Game Name in DRAM	An advanced option that would read the backup image and extract the game's name, displaying it on the screen.
Upload V64 BIOS to PC	Another advanced option for DV64 developers. It would transfer the Doctor V64's own program code to the PC through a parallel connection.
DX256 Upload to PC	This command allowed the operation of specific features of the DX256 cartridge adapter (an alternate cartridge adapter sold by Bung).
PC Download to DX256	This command allowed the operation of specific features to be downloaded onto the DX256 cartridge adaptor.
Swap Byte Order in DRAM	This command would convert the game image's endianness of a game image already loaded in RAM. Later bios revisions would do this automatically, deprecating this option.

== Detailed specifications ==
=== CD-ROM access speed ===
Most early V64 models shipped with a standard IDE 8X CD-ROM . During the manufacturing lifetime of the device, latter V64 models shipped with 16X and eventually 20X drives. V64 units could be purchased without a CD-ROM drive. It is possible to replace the unit with a faster IDE CD-ROM unit (such as the 52X model in the image on this page).

Many Doctor V64s shipped internationally were ordered without an installed CD-ROM drive, to save on shipping costs associated with weight, to avoid import duty on the drive, and to allow users to customize the units in response to the ever-increasing speeds of drives available. The variance in the power draw of different manufacturers drives at different speeds caused issues with disc spin-ups exceeding the wattage rating of the included Bung PSU. This led to users swapping out the Bung PSU for a more powerful model, or selecting low draw drives (mainly Panasonic drives sometimes badged as Creative).

=== CD-Media ===
V64s can read CD-Rs and CD-RWs (provided the installed CD-ROM unit supports rewritable media). Supported media has to be recorded in Mode 1, ISO 9660 format. Doctor V64s only support the 8.3 DOS naming convention. As such, Joliet file system is not supported.

=== RAM ===
Depending on the model, V64s came with either 128 megabits (16 MB) or 256 megabits (32 MB) of RAM. Original V64 units shipped with 128 megabits of RAM. V64 units started shipping with 256 megabits when developers started using bigger sized memory carts for their games. Users had the option of buying a memory upgrade from Bung and other re-sellers.

=== Power supply ===
The Doctor V64 uses a 4 Pin MiniDIN jack (as used for S-Video) for connecting the power supply cord. Power supplies included with Doctor V64s were very unreliable. Bung replaced the power supply with a sturdier version in later V64 units. Replacing broken power supplies became one of the most common maintenance problems with the V64. It is possible to modify an AT PC power supply for V64 use. Only 4 cables have to be connected to the V64 for it to function.

== Additional information ==
- The ROM extensions ".v64" and ".z64" started out as the preferred naming conventions by Doctor V64 and Z64 users, respectively. It would also imply the file's "endianness" as those units employed little endian (V64) and big endian (Z64) byte alignment. ".n64" was used as well but not as much (it became more popular as N64 emulators began to appear). The terms ".v64" and ".z64" are still widely used today by the emulation community.
- Acclaim Entertainment subsidiary Iguana Entertainment used Doctor V64 units as their development hardware of choice during the N64 era. They were best known for developing the Turok, NBA Jam, NFL Quarterback Club, and South Park video games.
