= Retrode =

USB adapter for console controllers and cartridges

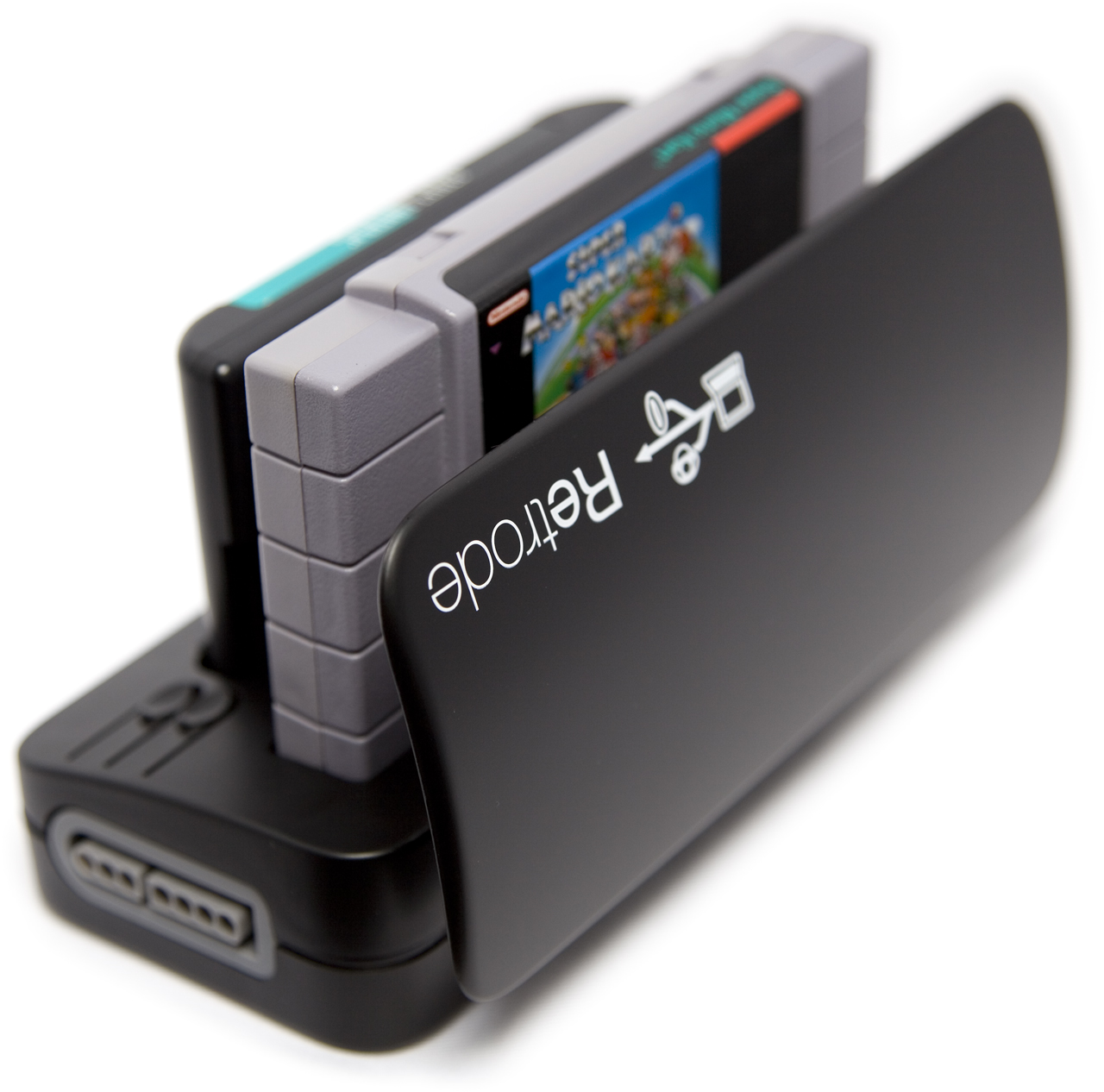
- Retrode 2 with two game cartridges inserted
- Manufacturer: Matthias Hullin / Retrode UG (haftungsbeschränkt)
- Type: USB adapter / Game controller / Game backup device hybrid
- Connectivity: USB 2.0
- Website: www.retrode.com

The Retrode is a USB adapter for legacy video games that enabled the use of game cartridges and controllers with emulators. Technically, the Retrode could be considered a ROM dumper in that it could create a copy of the cartridge content. Unlike most such devices, the Retrode could be operated without drivers or special software under the most popular operating systems. It further allowed the emulator to directly access the game data through the file system, eliminating the need to create a ROM image as a separate step. By default, the Retrode was equipped with cartridge slots and controller ports for the SNES and Sega Genesis (also known as Mega Drive outside North America) game consoles; support for cartridges and controllers for other systems could be added via so-called plug-in adapters that users can buy online or make themselves.

== History ==
The device was originally conceived by Matthias Hullin in 2009 during a discussion on USB accessories in a user forum for the Pandora handheld gaming console. Hullin prototyped the envisioned operation principle by wiring an edge connector to an AT90USBKey evaluation board running a custom firmware, and prepared a demonstration video. After receiving significant coverage through various press outlets, Hullin developed the proof-of-concept (working title "snega2usb") into a product that was later manufactured by Retrode UG in Germany. Retrode UG ceased manufacturing the Retrode in the summer of 2013. The Retrode got licensed to OpenPandora GmbH in Germany and is available again since March 2015. The Retrode from 2015 is the second hardware revision.

For each of the two hardware revisions, the transition from prototype to mass production was enabled through crowdfunding (pre-ordering). A comprehensive write-up by a Retrode user documents the history of the project.

== Technical properties ==
The Retrode was based on an Atmel AVR microcontroller (AT90USB646) with an integrated USB interface, connecting to cartridge slots and game controller ports via the microcontroller's GPIO pins. Its updateable firmware was based on the LUFA library by Dean Camera, and was developed mainly by Hullin with the help of a few users.

The device enumerated as a composite USB device consisting of a USB mass storage endpoint and one or several USB game controllers. Access to the cartridge contents (typically a ROM chip with the game itself and optionally also a battery-backed SRAM to store game progress) was provided through files on the USB medium. A number of device parameters could be edited through a configuration file.

The first commercial version of the Retrode featured an aluminum profile enclosure with two slots to accommodate SNES and Sega Genesis game cartridges. Internal soldering pins allowed users to retrofit up to four ports for SNES controllers. The successor model, the Retrode 2, used a plastic enclosure with a dust cover, and had four controller ports built in—two for each system, SNES and Sega Genesis.

== Consoles supported ==
Console(s)	DIY Provisions	Production Run	Slot	Voltage Required
Super Nintendo Entertainment System	None; Built-in support in Retrode 1 and 2	Ongoing batches of production of Retrode 2	N/A	5V
Mega Drive/Genesis	None; Built-in support in Retrode 1 and 2	Ongoing batches of production of Retrode 2	N/A	5V
Nintendo 64	PCB layout and schematic soon	Ongoing production	Mega Drive/Genesis	3.3V
Game Boy variants	PCB layout and schematic soon	Ongoing production	Mega Drive/Genesis	3.3V for Game Boy Advance; 5V for Game Boy and Game Boy Color
Sega Master System and Game Gear	Wiring key, design and build write-up/rough guide (for original prototype); PCB layout and schematic soon	Ongoing production (without Game Gear slot, but space provided to solder your own on)	Mega Drive/Genesis	5V
Atari 2600	PCB layout and schematic	Previous sold out; none planned	SNES	5V
TurboGrafx16/PC Engine	Wiring key	None planned	SNES	5V
Virtual Boy	Wiring key; design and build write-up/rough guide	None planned	Mega Drive/Genesis	5V
Neo Geo Pocket variants	Wiring key; Japanese design and build write-up/rough guide	None planned	SNES	3.3V
Sega Pico	Wiring key; design and build write-up/rough guide	None planned	Mega Drive/Genesis	5V
V.Smile	Wiring key; brief build notes	None planned	Sega Genesis	Unknown (5V?)

== See also ==
- Game backup device
- ROM image
- Pandora (console)
