= Bung Enterprises =

Hong Kong electronics company

- Founded: 1994; 32 years ago British Hong Kong
- Defunct: March 2000
- Website: www.bung.com.hk (archived version from April 1998)

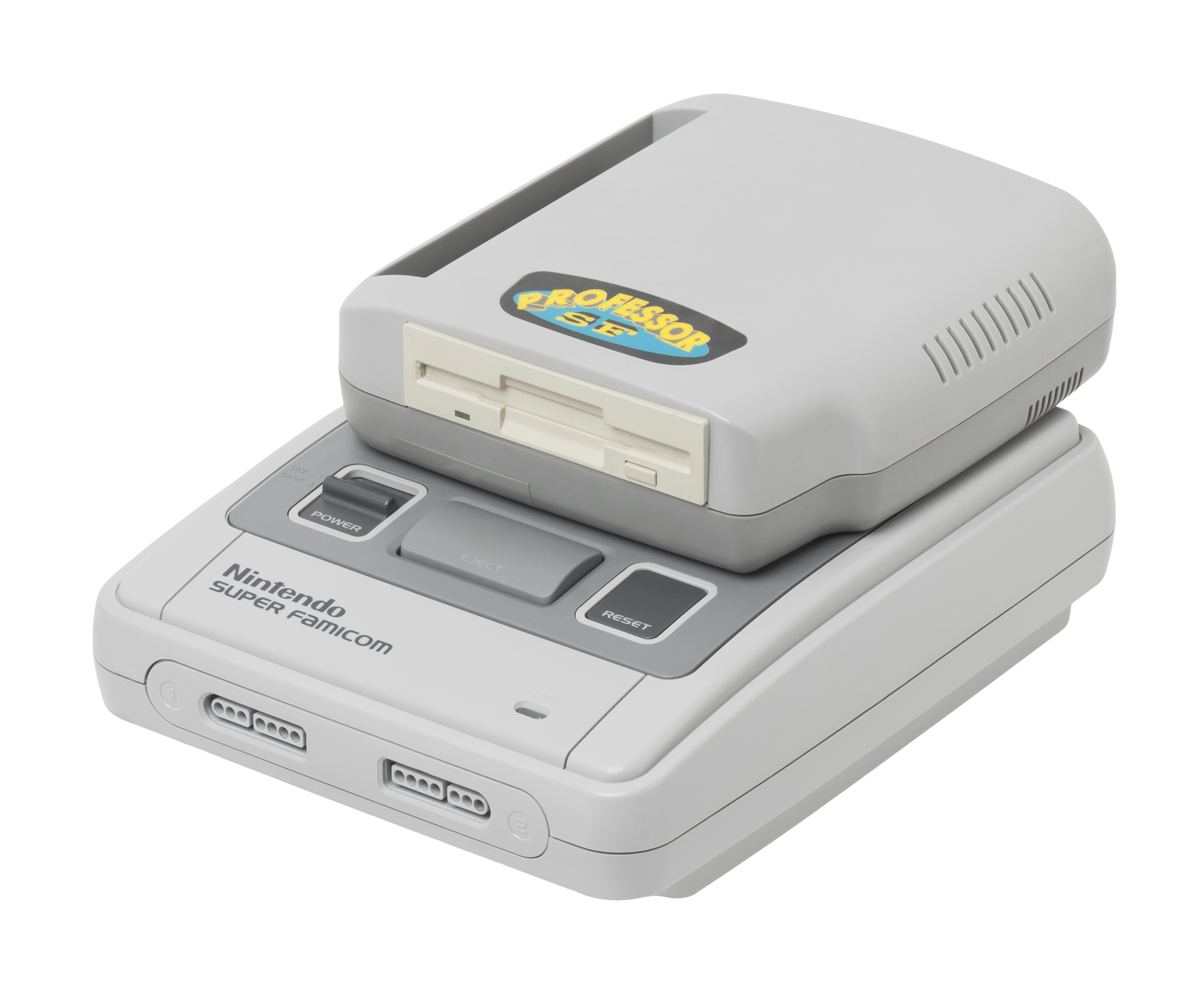
The Professor SF, made by Bung, was a backup device for the Super Famicom.

Bung Enterprises Ltd. was an electronics company based in Hong Kong. Its products were controversial backup and development units for videogame consoles, which could allow the user to play a game without owning the original cartridge. Backup units for Nintendo Entertainment System, Super NES, Neo-Geo, Neo Geo Pocket, Genesis, Game Boy and Nintendo 64 were developed and produced by Bung.

"Bung" is the approximate pronunciation of the company's Chinese name (Chinese: 邦谷; pinyin: bānggǔ). Both written forms were used in product packaging and marketing literature, and the somewhat crude connotation of the English word appears to have been an unintended coincidence. Although in business for more than a decade, the company was relatively unknown in the West until the late 1990s. In 1997 it began selling the Doctor V64, the first commercially available copier for the Nintendo 64, which quickly gained popularity in the United States and Europe. The following year, it released the V64 Jr, a lower cost model without a CD-ROM drive. The company also began selling rewritable flash memory cards for the Game Boy, and a programming interface called the GB Xchanger.

During this time period, Nintendo became increasingly aggressive at trying to stop Bung and the sale of its products. Nintendo first filed lawsuits in the United States against retailers Carl Industries and Upstate Games, accusing them of contributory copyright infringement for selling Bung products. This was initially a somewhat difficult case for Nintendo, as under the Betamax precedent, copying devices were legal in the United States if they had non-infringing uses. It turned out that due to a severe shortage of official development hardware from Nintendo, many game developers had been buying from Bung instead. When Bung became aware of this, they began promoting their products for this purpose, and even sponsored a coding competition for amateur game developers. The US lawsuits were eventually settled, with the retailers agreeing to stop selling the copying devices.

Nintendo tried a different tactic to stop sales in Europe by reporting Bung products as not being CE mark certified. This resulted in Bung having their power adapters certified, and sales continued. Nintendo next filed a lawsuit against Bung in Hong Kong. The owners of Bung Enterprises responded by dissolving the corporation in March 2000. A few months later they formed a new company under the name First Union Technology, and began selling the same products with different labeling, using the brand name Mr. Flash. The V64 Jr. was sold as the E64, and the GB Xchanger became the Flash Linker.

After Nintendo succeeded in having shipments of the new "Mr. Flash" products confiscated by US Customs, the company stopped selling directly to US residents, but sales through third parties continued. Nintendo next focused on Hong Kong retailer Lik Sang, which Microsoft and Sony were also targeting due to sales of modchips. This led to a slightly embarrassing incident in February 2002 in which US Customs intercepted a rather innocuous package containing a serial cable. Package seizures apparently ceased after this incident. In October 2002, Nintendo, Sony, and Microsoft jointly filed suit against Lik-Sang, resulting in the company shutting down for two weeks, and then reopening sans the disputed products.

== Products ==
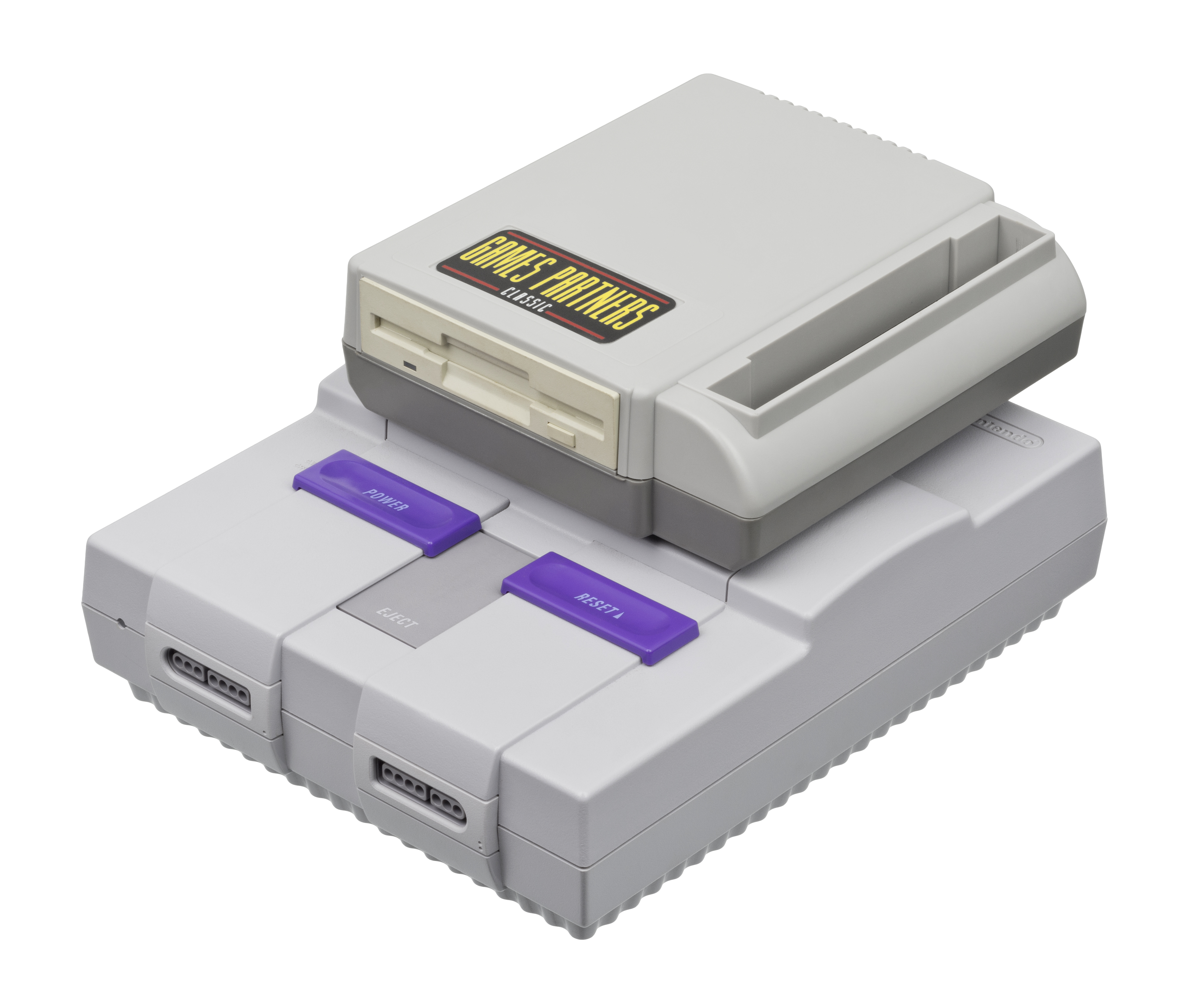
The Game Partners Classic, a game copier for the North American market.

=== Game Doctor/Professor SF ===
Known in Hong Kong as "超任博士" (literally means Super Nintendo Doctor), this unit was designed for the backing up of Super Famicom/Super NES games.

=== GB Xchanger ===
This unit was designed for the backing up of Game Boy and Game Boy Color games. It was also used to write said backups onto a flash cartridge for use on the consoles in question. The unit was designed with a Game Boy-specific slot on the top of the unit and took 6 AAA batteries or a 9 V adapter for power, and it connected to a PC via a parallel port.

=== Neo Flash Linker ===
This unit was designed for the backing up of Neo-Geo Pocket and Neo-Geo Pocket Color games. The physical construction was identical to that of the GB Xchanger unit, save for the Neo-Geo Pocket slot on top, as opposed to the Game Boy slot. NGP flash carts were also available.

=== Doctor V64 ===
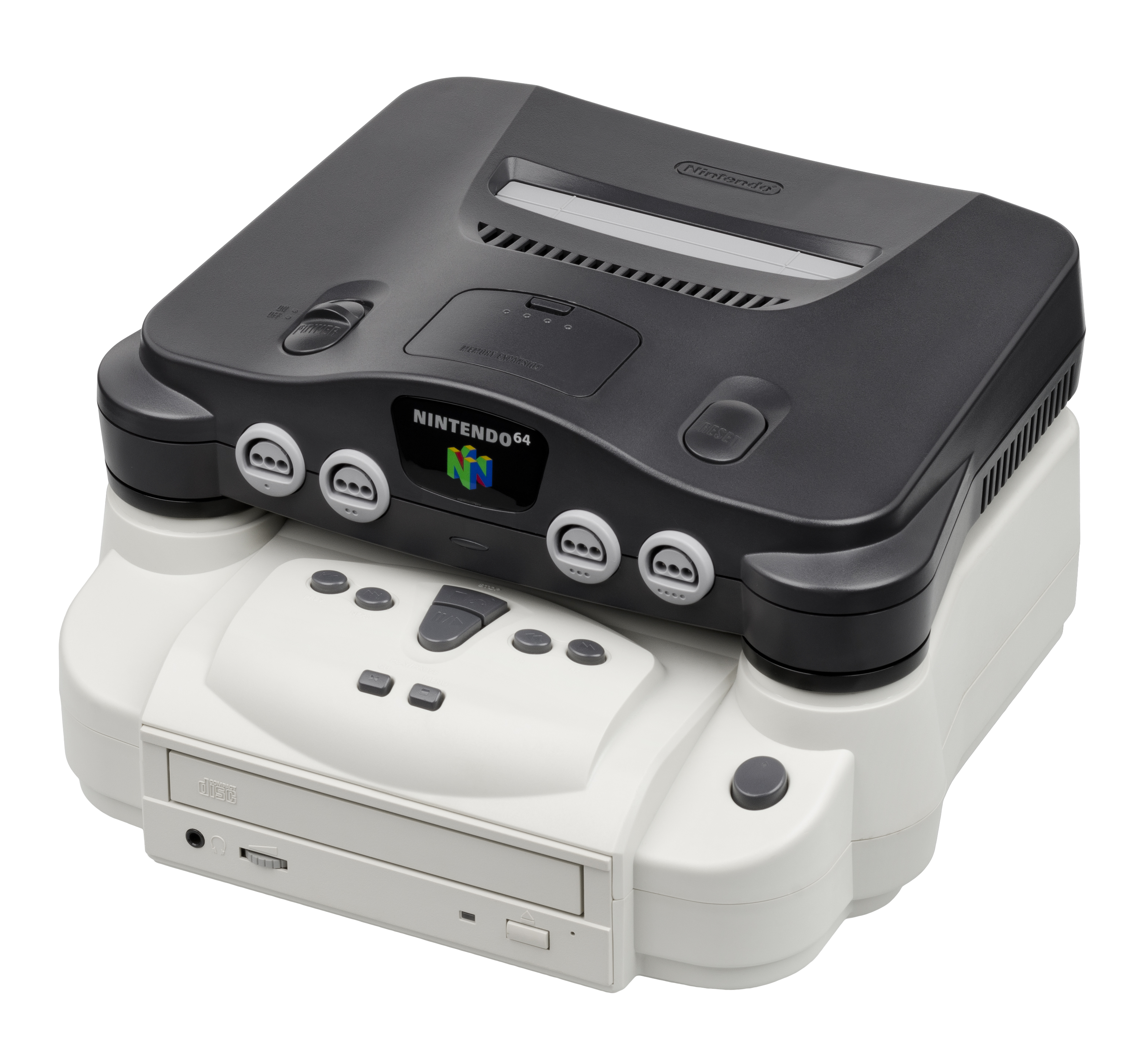
Doctor V64
