= Team Xecuter =

Game console hacker group

Team Xecuter is a hacker group that makes mod chips, cartridges, and jailbreaking software for game consoles. Among console hackers, who primarily consist of hobbyists testing boundaries and believe in the open-source model, Team Xecuter was controversial for selling hacking tools and their CFW for the Nintendo Switch "SX OS" for profit. Console systems targeted by the group include the Nintendo Switch, Nintendo 3DS, GameCube, NES Classic Edition, PlayStation, Xbox and the Xbox 360.

== Legal issues ==
In September 2020, Canadian national Gary Bowser was arrested in the Dominican Republic and French national Max "MAXiMiLiEN" Louarn, who was also active in the warez–demogroup Paradox, was detained in Tanzania by order of American authorities to face charges relating to designing and selling "circumvention devices", specifically products to circumvent Nintendo Switch copy protection, and were named, along with Chinese citizen Yuanning Chen, in a federal indictment filed in U.S. District Court in Seattle, Washington on August 20 of the same year. Each of the three men named in the indictment faced 11 felony counts, including conspiracy to commit wire fraud, conspiracy to circumvent technological measures and to traffic in circumvention devices, trafficking in circumvention devices, and conspiracy to commit money laundering. Bowser handled public relations for the group, which has been in operation since "at least" 2013.

On October 16, 2020, the Dar es Salaam district court dismissed the extradition request for Max Louarn to the United States on the grounds that his arrest had been illegal. Louarn thereafter traveled to Reunion Island (which is an overseas department of France) by private jet to avoid any further attempts to apprehend him by the American authorities, before finally returning to mainland France itself. While there is still an outstanding international warrant for his arrest, Louarn remains a free man as French law does not allow the extradition of its own citizens.

By October 2021, Bowser pled guilty to conspiracy to circumvent technological measures and trafficking in circumvention devices, agreeing to pay a $4.5 million penalty and to continue to work with authorities in their continued investigation of Team Xecuter in exchange for dropping the other nine charges against him. In December, he was ordered to pay another $10 million to Nintendo. On February 10, 2022, Bowser was sentenced to 40 months in prison. He was subsequently granted an early release due to his old age, health issues which were exacerbated in prison, and his status as Canadian-born.

Nintendo separately filed a civil lawsuit against Bowser in April 2021 related to three counts of copyright infringement, seeking damages of $2500 per trafficked device, and $150,000 for each copyright violation.

Nintendo has also successfully prevailed in another lawsuit involving resellers of Team Xecuter devices, winning $2 million with a settlement. According to Bowser, the terms of his verdicts result in him indefinitely paying Nintendo 25 to 30% of his gross income each month for the rest of his life.
