= Operation Tangled Web =

Raid by the United States government to enforce copyright laws pertaining to video games

Operation Tangled Web is the name of a raid conducted in 2007 by the U.S. Immigration and Customs Enforcement as part of a crackdown on modchips and copyright circumvention devices. These devices allowed third-party software or unauthorized copies of video games to be played on video game systems. Agents raided 30 businesses and homes that distributed or used these devices. The use of copyright circumvention devices and arguably modchips is a violation of the Digital Millennium Copyright Act.

== Raid Locations ==
The raids were carried out in 16 U.S. states. The states are California, Florida, Hawaii, Idaho, Illinois, Maryland, Massachusetts, Michigan, Minnesota, New York, North Carolina, Ohio, Pennsylvania, South Carolina, Texas and Wisconsin. The names of the businesses and individuals raided were not released.

== Reactions ==
The Entertainment Software Association commended the work of the U.S. Law Enforcement agents and prosecutors that made the raid possible. Nintendo and its game publishers have claimed to have lost over 762 million USD, and have sought to help law enforcement agents to crack down on unlicensed video game distribution. Their efforts have resulted in 61,000 modchips being seized worldwide. The modding community's response was typically that one function of a device that has legitimate uses should not illegalize the entire device especially if "the circumvention of copy protection mechanisms" has legitimate uses such as archiving legally purchased media.
