= Modchip =

Device used to disable artificial restrictions in video game consoles

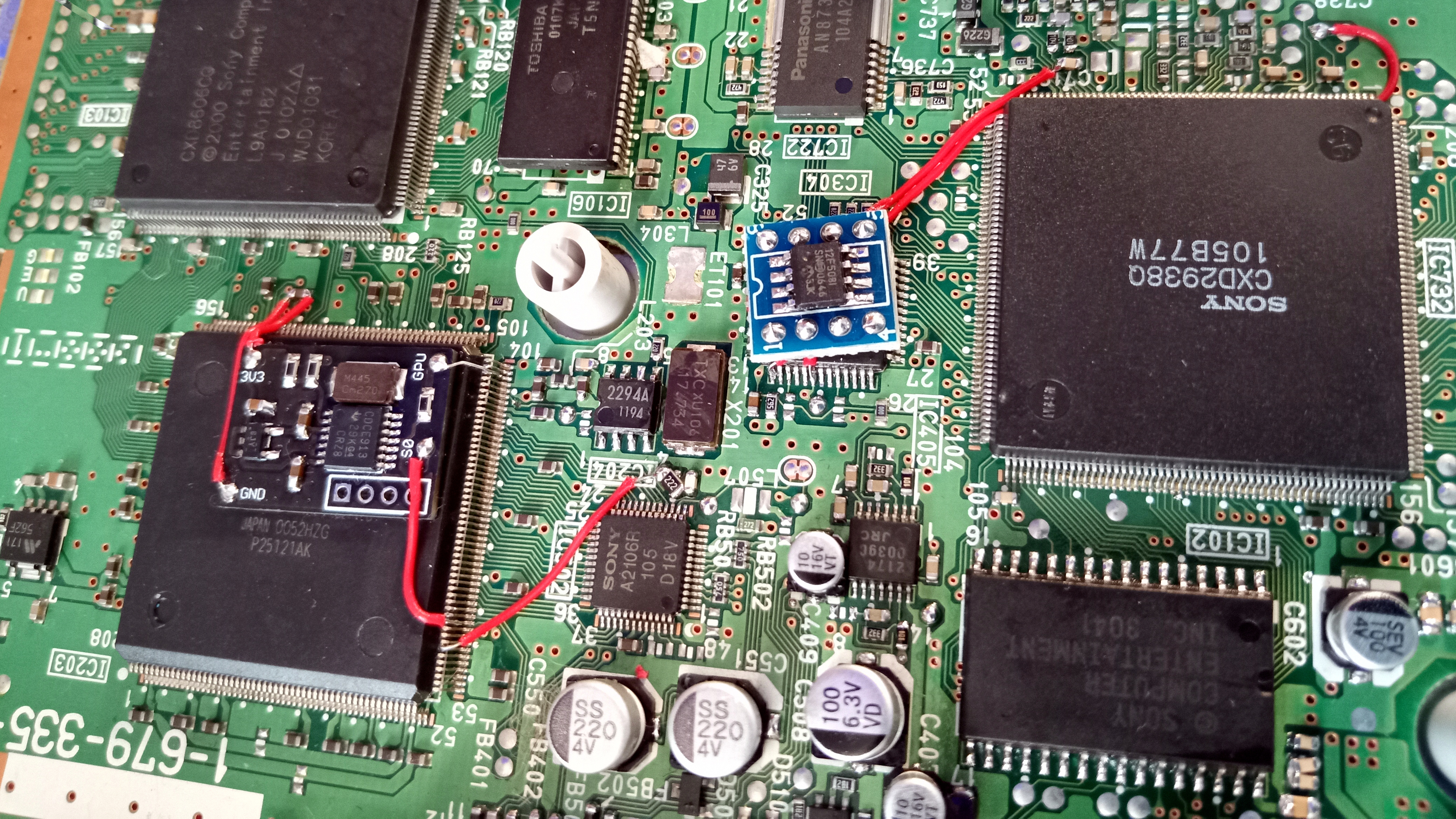
A modchip, the blue circuit board, attached to a PlayStation mainboard

A modchip (short for modification chip, sometimes known as a hardmod) is a small electronic device used to alter or disable artificial restrictions of computers or entertainment devices. Modchips are mainly used in video game consoles, but also in some DVD or Blu-ray players. They introduce various modifications to its host system's function, including the circumvention of region coding, digital rights management, and copy protection checks for the purpose of using media intended for other markets, copied media, or unlicensed third-party (homebrew) software.

== Function and construction ==
Modchips operate by replacing or overriding a system's protection hardware or software. They achieve this by either exploiting existing interfaces in an unintended or undocumented manner, or by actively manipulating the system's internal communication, sometimes to the point of re-routing it to substitute parts provided by the modchip.

Most modchips consist of one or more integrated circuits (microcontrollers, FPGAs, or CPLDs), often complemented with discrete parts, usually packaged on a small PCB to fit within the console system it is designed for. Although there are modchips that can be reprogrammed for different purposes, most modchips are designed to work within only one console system or even only one specific hardware version.

Modchips typically require some degree of technical skill to install since they must be connected to a console's circuitry, most commonly by soldering wires to select traces or chip legs on a system's circuit board. Some modchips allow for installation by directly soldering the modchip's contacts to the console's circuit ("quicksolder"), by the precise positioning of electrical contacts ("solderless"), or, in rare cases, by plugging them into a system's internal or external connector.

Memory cards or cartridges that offer functions similar to modchips work on a completely different concept, namely by exploiting flaws in the system's handling of media. Such devices are not referred to as modchips, even if they are frequently traded under this umbrella term.

The diversity of hardware modchips operate on and varying methods they use mean that while modchips are often used for the same goal, they may work in vastly different ways, even if they are intended for use on the same console. Some of the first modchips for the Wii, known as drive chips, modify the behaviour and communication of the optical drive to bypass security. On the Xbox 360, a common modchip took advantage of the fact short periods of instability in the CPU could be used to fairly reliably lead it to incorrectly compare security signatures. The precision required in this attack meant that the modchip had to make use of a CPLD. Other modchips, such as the XenoGC and clones for the GameCube, invoke a debug mode where security measures are reduced or absent (in which case, a stock Atmel AVR microcontroller was used). A more recent innovation are optical disk drive emulators or ODDE, which replace the optical disk drive and allow data to come from another source bypassing the need to circumvent any security. These often make use of FPGAs to enable them to accurately emulate timing and performance characteristics of the optical drives.

== History ==
Most cartridge-based console systems did not have modchips produced for them. They usually implemented copy protection and regional lockout with game cartridges, both on hardware and software level. Converters or passthrough devices have been used to circumvent the restrictions, while flash memory devices (game backup devices) were widely adopted in later years to copy game media. Early in the transition from solid-state to optical media, CD-based console systems did not have regional market segmentation or copy protection measures due to the rarity and high cost of user-writable media at the time.

Modchips started to surface with the PlayStation system, due to the increasing availability and affordability of CD writers and the increasing sophistication of DRM protocols. At the time, a modchip's sole purpose was to allow the use of imported and copied game media.

== Anti-modchip measures ==
Most modchips open the system to copied media, therefore the availability of a modchip for a console system is undesirable for console manufacturers. They react by removing the intrusion points exploited by a modchip from subsequent hardware or software versions, changing the PCB layout the modchips are customized for, or by having the firmware or software detect an installed modchip and refuse operation as a consequence. Since modchips often hook into fundamental functions of the host system that cannot be removed or adjusted, these measures may not completely prevent a modchip from functioning but only prompt an adjustment of its installation process or programming, e.g. to include measures to make it undetectable ("stealth") to its host system.

With the advent of online services to be used by video game consoles, some manufacturers have executed their possibilities within the service's license agreement to ban consoles equipped with modchips from using those services.

In an effort to dissuade modchip creation, some console manufacturers included the option to run homebrew software or even an alternative operating system on their consoles, such as Linux for PlayStation 2. However, some of these features have been withdrawn at a later date. An argument can be made that a console system remains largely untouched by modchips as long as their manufacturers provide an official way of running unlicensed third-party software.

== Legality ==
One of the most prominent functions of many modchips—the circumvention of copy protection mechanisms—is outlawed by many countries' copyright laws such as the Digital Millennium Copyright Act in the United States, the European Copyright Directive and its various implementations by the EU member countries, and the Australian Copyright Act. Other laws may apply to the many diversified functions of a modchip, e.g. Australian law specifically allowing the circumvention of region coding.

The ambiguity of applicable law, its nonuniform interpretation by the courts, and constant profound changes and amendments to copyright law do not allow for a definitive statement on the legality of modchips. A modchip's legality under a country's legislature may only be individually asserted in court.

Most of the very few cases that have been brought before a court ended with the conviction of the modchip merchant or the manufacturer under the respective country's anti-circumvention laws. A small number of cases in the United Kingdom and Australia were dismissed under the argument that a system's copy protection mechanism would not be able to prevent the actual infringement of copyright—the actual process of copying game media—and therefore cannot be considered an effective technical protection measure protected by anti-circumvention laws. In 2006, Australian copyright law has been amended to effectively close this legal loophole.

In a 2017 lawsuit against a retailer, a Canadian court ruled in favor of Nintendo under anti-circumvention provisions in Canadian copyright law, which prohibit any breaching of technical protection measures. The court ruled that even though the retailer claimed the products could be used for homebrew, thus asserting exemptions for maintaining interoperability, the court ruled that because Nintendo offers development kits for its platforms, interoperability could be achieved without breaching TPMs, and thus the defence is invalid.

In Japan, modchips were outlawed as part of new legislation in 2018 which made savegame editing and console modding illegal.

== Modchips for video game consoles ==
=== Fifth generation ===
==== PlayStation ====
- MM3 (Multi-Mode 3), an open-source, PIC microcontroller based modchip used to bypass region coding and copy protection on the original PlayStation.

=== Sixth generation ===
==== Xbox ====
- Aladdin, a popular series of low cost LPC bus modchips designed for the original Xbox.
- Xecuter 3 (X3), a high end, feature rich fourth generation modchip for the original Xbox featuring an external LCD panel interface and multi-BIOS banking.

==== PlayStation 2 ====
- Modbo, a widely cloned series of modchips based on the Matrix Infinity architecture used for direct booting homebrew on the PlayStation 2.

=== Seventh generation ===
==== Xbox 360 ====
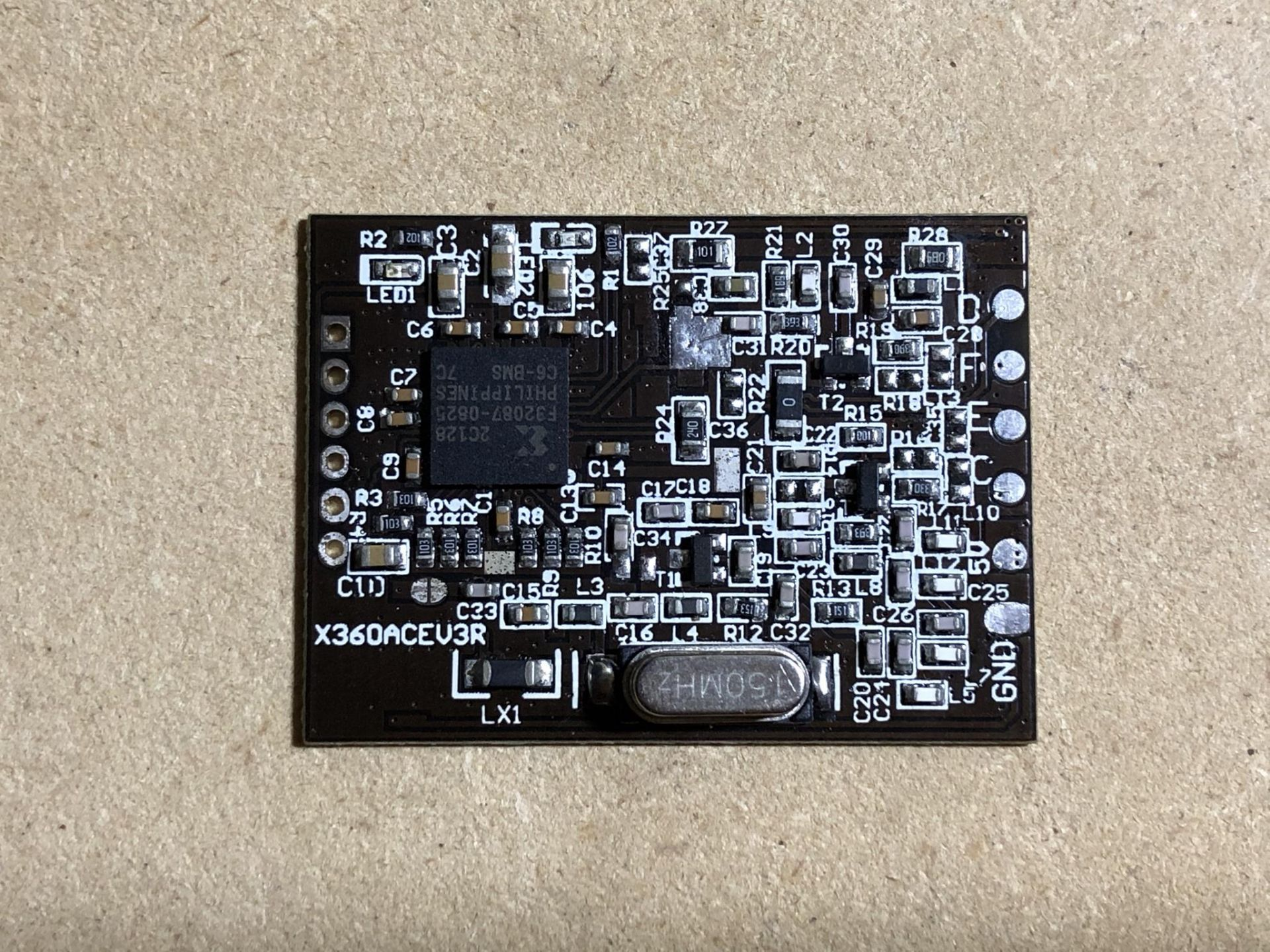
An example of the X360ACE v3R modchip

- X360ACE, an RGH (Reset Glitch Hack) modchip for the Xbox 360.
- Team Xecuter CoolRunner, a family of CPLD-based glitch chips widely used in early Xbox 360 RGH1 and RGH2 installations.

==== PlayStation 3 ====
- BadHTAB, a RP2040-based modchip for the PlayStation 3.
- BadWDSD, a RP2040-based modchip compatible with any NOR-based PlayStation 3.

==== Wii ====
- Wiikey, a prominent first generation drive firmware emulating modchip for the Wii.
- Wasabi DX, a solderless drive bus modchip that bypassed the optical disc drive controller on the Wii.

=== Eighth generation ===
==== Nintendo Switch ====
- SAMD21, a series of modchips that enable "V1 Unpatched" Nintendo Switch consoles to boot via the Fusée Gelée softmod, removing the need to have another device that would normally inject a payload.
- Picofly, a modern, low cost modchip utilizing the RP2040 microcontroller, that hijacks the eMMC bus of the Nintendo Switch during the boot sequence via voltage glitch.

==== Xbox One ====
- Bliss, a voltage glitch hack for earlier models of the Xbox One.

== Alternatives ==
An alternative of installing a modchip is a process of softmodding a device. A softmodded device does not need to permanently have any additional hardware pieces inside. Instead, the software of a device or its internal part is modified in order to change the device's behaviour.

== See also ==
- Game backup device
- Operation Tangled Web
