= List of Dreamcast online games =

This is a comprehensive list of online Dreamcast games, including those that could be played on SegaNet, an online gaming service by Sega.

== Games with online multiplayer support ==
Availability of online features may vary depending on the region. Games with release dates displayed in green backgrounds indicate that they have online support, while those with light grey backgrounds were released without online capabilities in that particular region.

Title	Developer(s)	Publisher(s)	Release date			Ref.
Title	Developer(s)	Publisher(s)	JP	NA	PAL	Ref.
4x4 Evo	Terminal Reality	Gathering of Developers	Unreleased	October 30, 2000	Unreleased	
Aero Dancing F: Todoroki Tsubasa no Hatsu Hikō	CRI	CRI Middleware	February 24, 2000	Unreleased	Unreleased	
Aero Dancing i	CRI	CRI Middleware	February 15, 2001	Unreleased	Unreleased	
Aero Dancing i: Jikai Saku Made Matemasen	CRI	CRI Middleware	August 23, 2001	Unreleased	Unreleased	
Alien Front Online	Sega	Sega	Unreleased	August 9, 2001	Unreleased	
Atsumare! GuruGuru Onsen	Overworks	Sega	September 23, 1999	Unreleased	Unreleased	
Atsumare! GuruGuru Onsen BB	Overworks	Sega	October 31, 2000	Unreleased	Unreleased	
Bomberman Online	Hudson Soft	Sega	Unreleased	October 30, 2001	Unreleased	
Capcom vs. SNK	Capcom	Capcom	September 6, 2000	November 8, 2000	December 15, 2000	
Capcom vs. SNK Pro	Capcom	Capcom	June 14, 2001	Unreleased	Unreleased	
Capcom vs. SNK 2	Capcom	Capcom	September 13, 2001	Unreleased	Unreleased	
ChuChu Rocket!	Sonic Team	Sega	November 11, 1999	February 29, 2000	June 9, 2000	
Culdcept Second	OmiyaSoft	Media Factory	July 12, 2001	Unreleased	Unreleased	
Cyber Troopers Virtual-On Oratorio Tangram	Sega AM3	Sega	December 9, 1999	June 7, 2000	Unreleased	
Daytona USA 2001	Amusement Vision	Sega, Hasbro Interactive	December 21, 2000	March 12, 2001	May 11, 2001	
Dee Dee Planet	Sega	Sega	Prototype	Unreleased	Unreleased	
Driving Strikers	WAVE Game Studios	WAVE Game Studios	Unreleased	July 2023	July 2023	
Frame Gride	FromSoftware	FromSoftware	July 15, 1999	Unreleased	Unreleased	
Gundam Battle Online	Bandai	Bandai	June 28, 2001	Unreleased	Unreleased	
Guruguru Onsen 2	Overworks	Sega	August 9, 2001	Unreleased	Unreleased	
Guruguru Onsen 3	Overworks	Sega	March 14, 2002	Unreleased	Unreleased	
Hanagumi Taisen Columns 2	Sega	Sega	January 6, 2000	Unreleased	Unreleased	
Heavy Metal: Geomatrix	Capcom	Capcom	July 12, 2001	September 12, 2001	April 26, 2002	
Hundred Swords	Capcom	Capcom	February 8, 2001	Unreleased	Unreleased	
Internet Game Pack	Visual Concepts	Sega	Unreleased	Prototype	Unreleased	
JoJo's Bizarre Adventure: For Matching Service	Capcom	Capcom	November 25, 1999	Unreleased	Unreleased	
Kitahei Gold	SPS	NetVillage	November 18, 1999	Unreleased	Unreleased	
Marvel Vs. Capcom 2	Capcom	Capcom	March 30, 2000	June 27, 2000	July 16, 2000	
Maximum Pool	Dynamix	Sierra Sports	Unreleased	December 4, 2000	Unreleased	
Mobile Suit Gundam: Federation vs. Zeon DX	Capcom	Bandai	April 11, 2002	Unreleased	Unreleased	
Monaco Grand Prix Online	Ubi Soft Paris	Ubi Soft	Unreleased	Unreleased	November 23, 2001	
NBA 2K1	Visual Concepts	Sega	March 29, 2001	November 1, 2000	Unreleased	
NBA 2K2	Visual Concepts	Sega	May 23, 2002	October 24, 2001	March 8, 2002	
NCAA College Football 2K2	Visual Concepts	Sega	Unreleased	August 29, 2001	Unreleased	
The Next Tetris: On-line Edition	Blue Planet Software	Crave Entertainment	Unreleased	December 15, 2000	May 4, 2001	
Net de Para: Nekosogi Paradise	Takuyo Co Ltd	Takuyo Co Ltd	December 1, 2000	Unreleased	Unreleased	
Netto de Tennis	Capcom	Capcom	October 9, 2000	Unreleased	Unreleased	
Nettou Golf	Sega	Sega	October 19, 2000	Unreleased	Unreleased	
NFL 2K1	Visual Concepts	Sega Sports	Unreleased	September 7, 2000	Unreleased	
NFL 2K2	Visual Concepts	Sega Sports	Unreleased	September 19, 2001	Unreleased	
Nippon Pro Mahjong Renmei Dankurai Nintei: Heisei Mahjong-Shou	Micronet	Micronet	October 26, 2000	Unreleased	Unreleased	
Net Versus: Chess	Atmark	Atmark	May 24, 2001	Unreleased	Unreleased	
Net Versus: Hanafuda	Atmark	Atmark	May 24, 2001	Unreleased	Unreleased	
Net Versus: Igo	Atmark	Atmark	May 24, 2001	Unreleased	Unreleased	
Net Versus: Mahjong	Atmark	Atmark	May 24, 2001	Unreleased	Unreleased	
Net Versus: Renju Gomoku Narabe	Atmark	Atmark	May 24, 2001	Unreleased	Unreleased	
Net Versus: Reversi	Atmark	Atmark	May 24, 2001	Unreleased	Unreleased	
Net Versus: Shogi	Atmark	Atmark	May 24, 2001	Unreleased	Unreleased	
Ooga Booga	Visual Concepts	Sega	Unreleased	September 13, 2001	Unreleased	
Outtrigger	Sega AM2	Sega	August 2, 2001	July 24, 2001	August 3, 2001	
PBA Tour Bowling 2001	Bethesda Softworks	Bethesda Softworks	Unreleased	Prototype	Unreleased	
Phantasy Star Online	Sonic Team	Sega	December 21, 2000	January 29, 2001	February 23, 2001	
Phantasy Star Online Ver. 2	Sonic Team	Sega	June 7, 2001	September 24, 2001	March 1, 2002	
Planet Ring	Sega	Sega	Unreleased	Unreleased	December 4, 2000	
POD: Speedzone	Ubisoft Romania	Ubisoft	Unreleased	December 5, 2000	December 15, 2000	
Power Stone 2	Capcom	Capcom	April 27, 2000	August 23, 2000	August 24, 2000	
Project Justice	Capcom	Capcom	December 17, 2000	May 16, 2001	April 13, 2001	
Propeller Arena	Sega AM2	Sega	Unreleased	Prototype	Unreleased	
Pro Yakyuu Team de Asobou NET!	Sega	Sega	August 10, 2000	Unreleased	Unreleased	
Quake III Arena	Raster Productions	Sega	Unreleased	October 22, 2000	December 8, 2000	
QuakeWorld	Titanium Studios	Id Software	Unreleased	Prototype	Unreleased	
Rune Jade	Hudson Soft	Hudson Soft	Unreleased	August 24, 2000	Unreleased	
Sakura Taisen Online: Paris no Nagai Hibi	Overworks	Sega	December 20, 2001	Unreleased	Unreleased	
Sakura Taisen Online: Teito no Yuugana Hibi	Overworks	Sega	December 20, 2001	Unreleased	Unreleased	
Sega Rally 2	Sega AM Annex	Sega	January 28, 1999	November 30, 1999	October 14, 1999	
Sega Swirl	Tremor Entertainment	Sega	February 23, 2000	February 23, 2000	February 23, 2000	
Sega Tetris	WOW Entertainment	Sega	November 23, 2000	Unreleased	Unreleased	
Spawn: In the Demon's Hand	Capcom	Capcom	August 10, 2000	October 18, 2000	January 19, 2001	
Speed Devils: Online Racing	Ubisoft Montreal	Ubisoft	Unreleased	December 13, 2000	February 2, 2001	
StarLancer	Digital Anvil	Crave	Unreleased	November 27, 2000	March 30, 2001	
Street Fighter III: 3rd Strike	Capcom	Capcom	June 29, 2000	October 4, 2000	2000	
Street Fighter Zero 3: For Matching Service	Capcom	Capcom	July 8, 1999	Unreleased	Unreleased	
Super Puzzle Fighter II X: For Matching Service	Capcom	Capcom	July 5, 2001	Unreleased	Unreleased	
Super Street Fighter II X: For Matching Service	Capcom	Capcom	December 22, 2000	Unreleased	Unreleased	
Taisen Net Gimmick: Capcom & Psikyo All Stars	Psikyo	Capcom	June 28, 2001	Unreleased	Unreleased	
Tech Romancer: For Matching Service	Capcom	Capcom	January 13, 2000	Unreleased	Unreleased	
Toukon Retsuden 4	Yuke's	Tomy Corporation	September 2, 1999	Unreleased	Unreleased	
Toy Racer	No Cliche	Sega	Unreleased	Unreleased	December 22, 2000	
Treasure Strike	h.a.n.d. Inc.	Kid	February 17, 2000	Unreleased	Unreleased	
Unreal Tournament	Secret Level, Inc.	Infogrames	Unreleased	March 13, 2001	June 29, 2001	
Vampire Chronicle: For Matching Service	Capcom	Capcom	August 10, 2000	Unreleased	Unreleased	
Virtua Tennis	Hitmaker	Sega Sports	November 23, 2000	July 11, 2000	September 8, 2000	
World Series Baseball 2K2	Visual Concepts	Sega Sports	April 18, 2002	August 2001	Unreleased	
Worms World Party	Team17	Titus Interactive	Unreleased	June 3, 2001	April 27, 2001	

== Games with additional online features ==
Title	Developer(s)	Publisher(s)	Online Features	Notes	Ref.					
Title	Developer(s)	Publisher(s)	Online Features	Notes	Ref.	18 Wheeler: American Pro Trucker	Sega AM2	Sega	Leaderboards	JP version only
4x4 Evo	Terminal Reality	Gathering of Developers	DLC	Additional tracks						
ChuChu Rocket!	Sonic Team	Sega	DLC	User-created levels						
Crazy Taxi 2	Hitmaker	Sega	Leaderboards, DLC	Additional modes						
Daytona USA 2001	Amusement Vision	Sega, Hasbro Interactive	Leaderboards							
Derby Tsuku 2	Smilebit	Sega	Leaderboards							
F355 Challenge	Sega AM2	Sega	Competitive Time Trial							
Floigain Bros.	Visual Concepts	Sega	Chat, DLC	Minigames, mail, outfits						
Golf Shiyouyo 2: The New Challenge	SoftMax	SoftMax	Leaderboards							
Jet Grind Radio	Smilebit	Sega	Leaderboards, DLC	Graffiti						
Metropolis Street Racer	Bizarre Creations	Sega	Leaderboards, DLC	Ghosts						
Monaco Grand Prix Online	Ubi Soft Paris	Ubi Soft	Leaderboards							
Nettou Golf	Data East	Sega	Leaderboards							
POD: Speedzone	Ubisoft Romania	Ubisoft	Leaderboards							
Rayman 2	Ubi Pictures	Ubi Soft	DLC	Mini games						
Samba de Amigo	Sonic Team	Sega	Leaderboards, DLC	Additional Songs						
Samba de Amigo V2000	Sonic Team	Sega	Leaderboards, DLC	Additional Songs						
San Francisco Rush 2049	Midway	Midway	Leaderboards, DLC	Ghosts						
Sega GT	Wow Entertainment/Tose	Sega Sports	Leaderboards							
Sega Marine Fishing	Wow Entertainment	Sega Sports	Leaderboards, Messaging							
Sega Swirl	Tremor Entertainment	Sega	Email Challenge							
Skies of Arcadia	Overworks	Sega	DLC							
Sonic Adventure	Sonic Team	Sega	Leaderboards, DLC	Special Events, Sound Files, Kart Race Tracks, Chao						
Sonic Adventure 2	Sonic Team	Sega	DLC	Themes, Kart Race Tracks, Chao						
Star Wars Episode I: Racer	LucasArts	LucasArts	Leaderboards							
Tokyo Xtreme Racer 2	Genki	Crave Entertainment	Leaderboards, DLC							
Toukon Retsuden 4	Yuke's	Sega	Leaderboards							
Toy Racer	No Cliche	Sega	Leaderboards							
Vanishing Point	Clockwork Games	Acclaim Entertainment	Leaderboards							
Virtua Athlete 2000	Hitmaker	Sega	Leaderboards							
Visual Park	Sega	Sega	Video Calling, Email							
World Neverland Plus	Riverhillsoft	Riverhillsoft	Chat, Mail, DLC							
World Neverland 2 Plus	Riverhillsoft	Riverhillsoft	Chat, Mail, DLC							
World Series Baseball 2K2	Visual Concepts	Sega Sports	Leaderboards							

== See also ==
- List of Dreamcast games
