= Dreamcast online functionality =

Sega gaming console with internet access

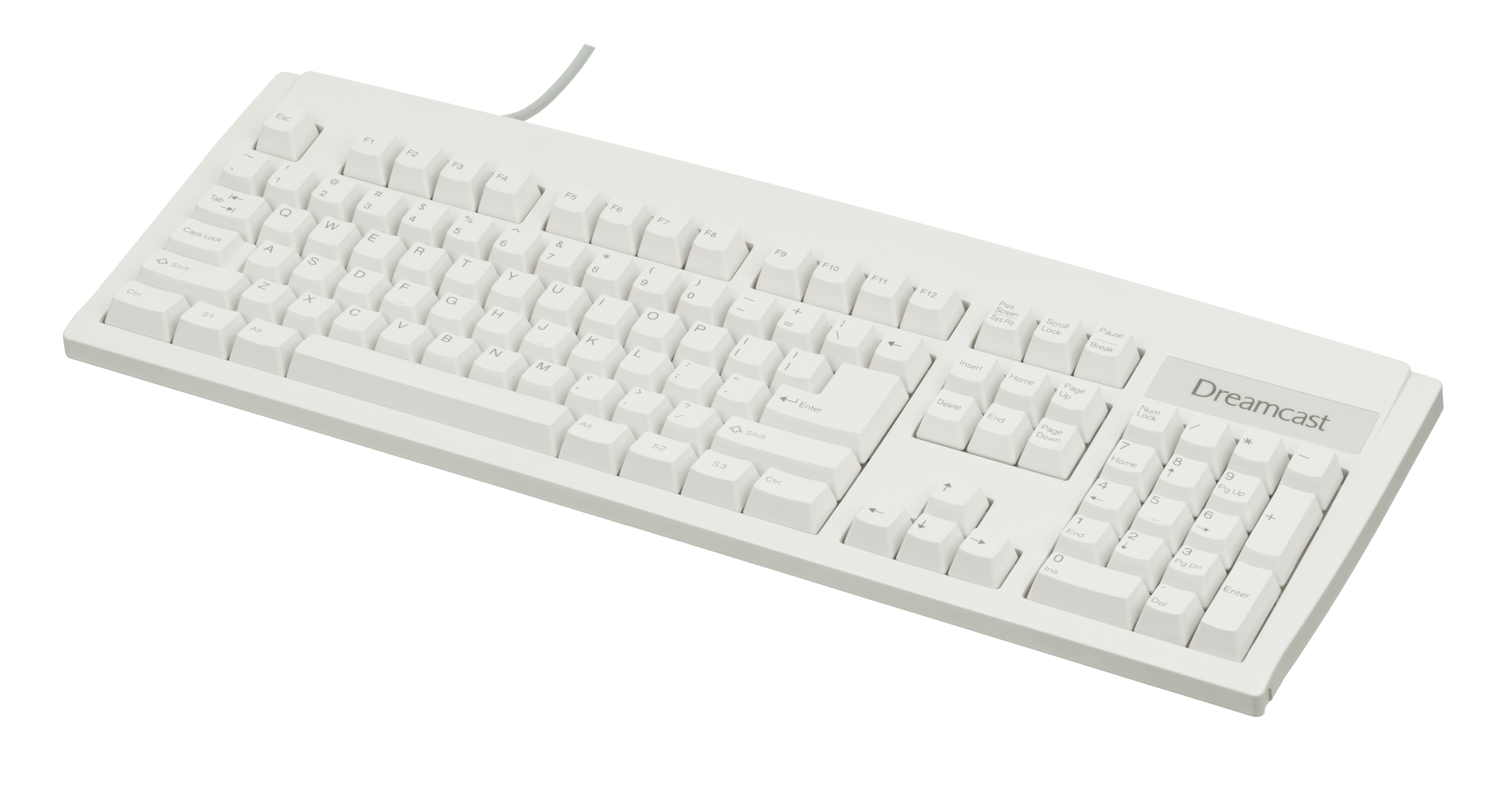
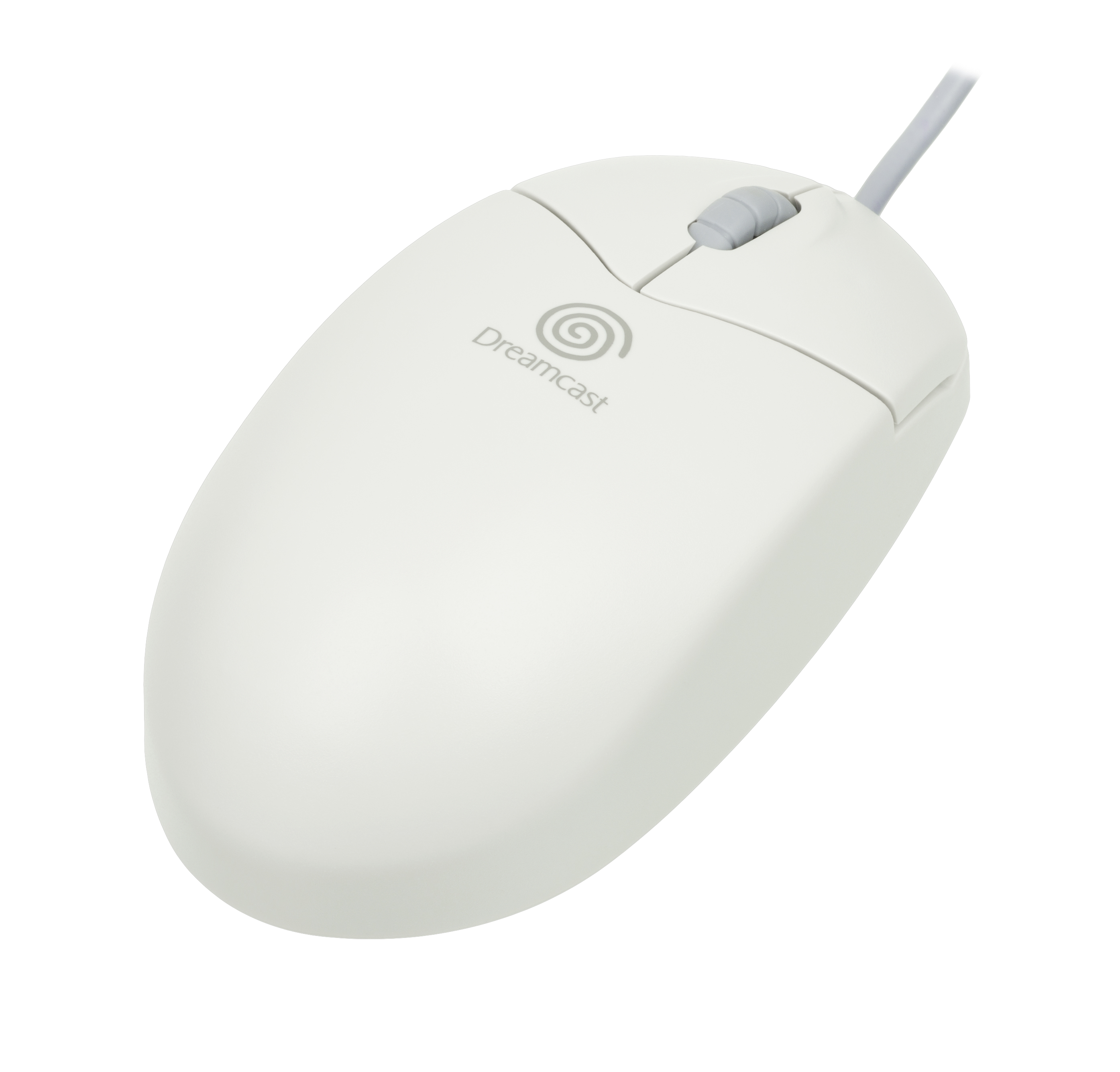
The keyboard and mouse produced by Sega for the Dreamcast. While both were intended for navigating and communicating on the Internet, many games supported them as alternate control methods, especially ports of PC games such as Quake III Arena.

The Dreamcast is a home video game console by Sega, the first one introduced in the sixth generation of video game consoles. With the release of the Dreamcast in 1998 amid the dot-com bubble and mounting losses from the development and introduction of its new home console, Sega made a major gamble in attempting to take advantage of the growing public interest in the Internet by including online capabilities in the console as a selling point. As such, the Dreamcast was the first console to include a built-in modem for Internet support and online play. (Note: The Apple Bandai Pippin, released in 1996, included a 14.4 kbit/s external modem that plugged into a GeoPort-capable serial port.) Sega would end up leaning heavily into the online capabilities to sell the Dreamcast as hype grew for Sony's then-upcoming competitor, the PlayStation 2, which also promised online gaming in addition to its DVD capabilities.

To create further incentive for use of the Dreamcast's online capabilities, Sega went beyond the scope of their prior online ventures and invested heavily in the development of unified online services for it, a concept that predated former partner Microsoft's Xbox Live service by a few years. Sega also predated Microsoft in pioneering the concept of downloadable content for games released on a console, though it was hampered by the small memory of the VMU. Despite the foresight Sega had in the emergence of broadband Internet access by making the modem modular and upgradeable with a broadband adapter, the services mainly supported dial-up Internet access throughout their lifetimes; only in Japan did broadband service arrive for the Dreamcast before Sega discontinued it in 2001, abandoning the console business altogether with its transition to third-party publishing. The services were gradually discontinued by Sega in the subsequent years; the last remaining service lingered on in Japan before it was shut down in 2007. In response, hobbyists have revived parts of the online services by creating private servers for a handful of games that had their official servers shut down.

== Hardware ==
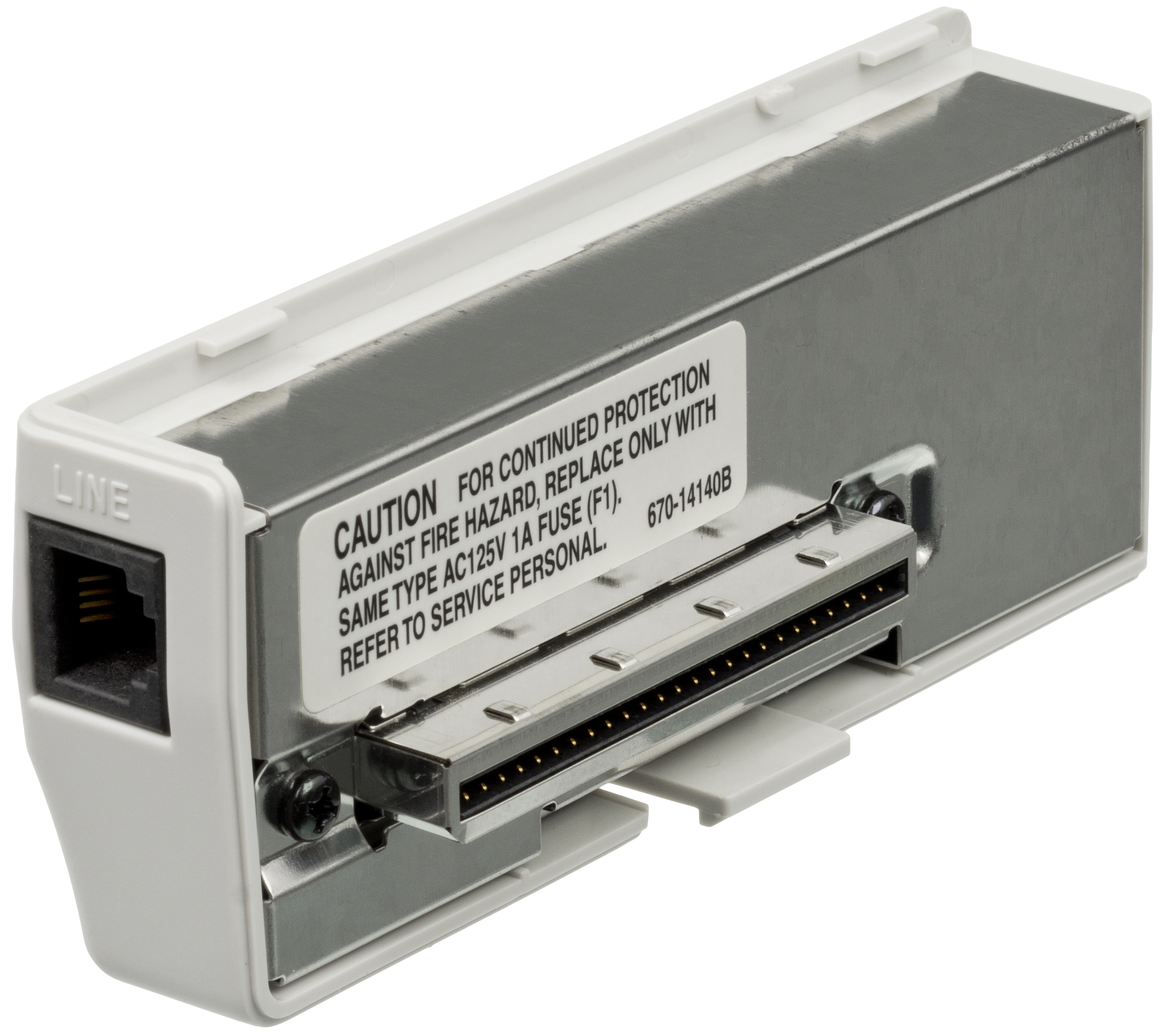
The 56K modem that was included with the Dreamcast

Sega produced two networking accessories for the Dreamcast worldwide, one for dial-up connections and one for broadband connections. A third accessory, also intended for broadband connections, was only available in Japan. All adapters are visually similar to each other; however, the first accessory includes a telephone jack while the latter two accessories include an RJ45 jack for Ethernet instead. The adapters attach flush to an expansion port on the side of the Dreamcast. Sega also produced a keyboard and a computer mouse for easier navigation of the Internet on the Dreamcast.

=== Modem Adapter ===
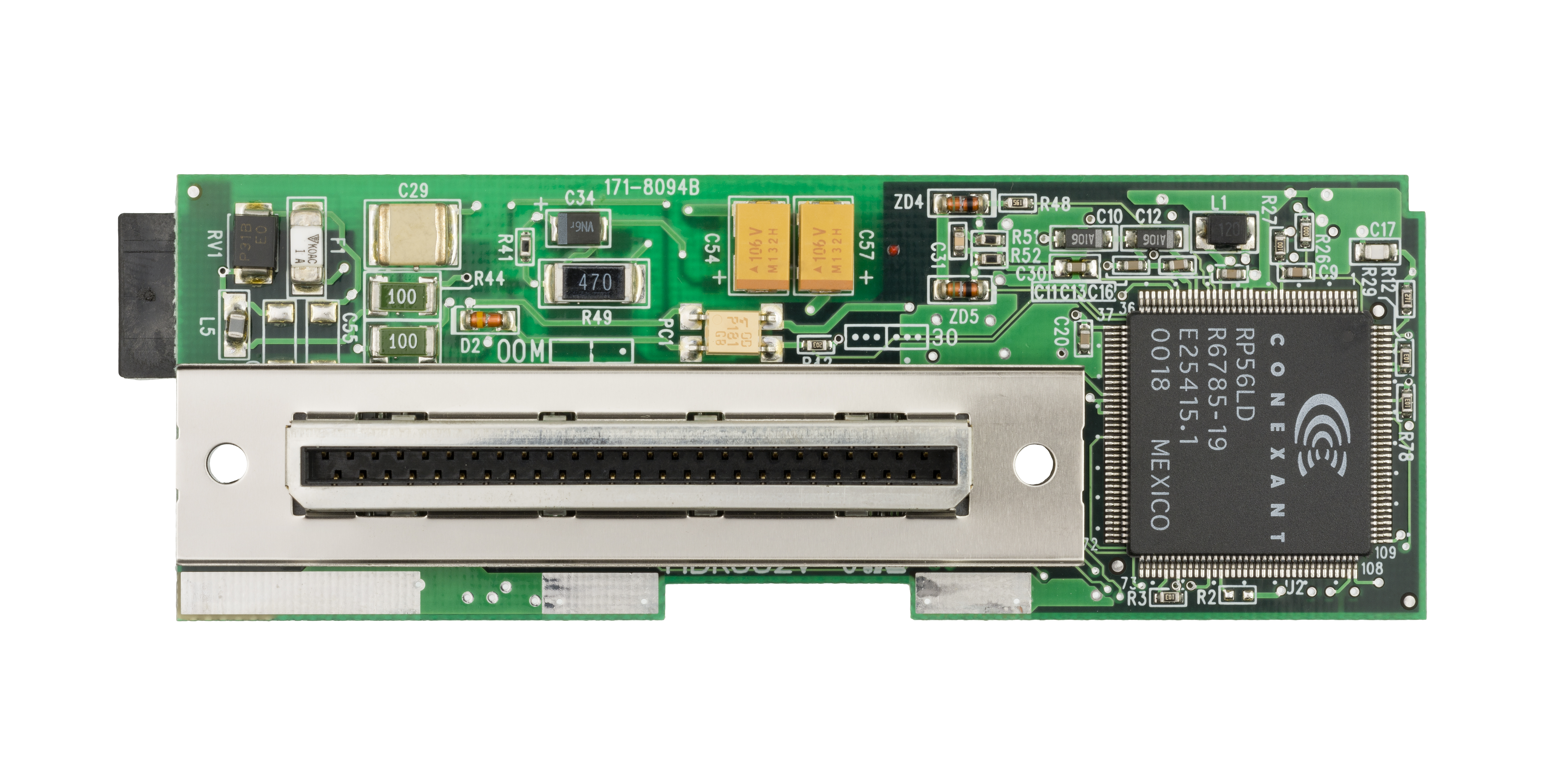
The motherboard for the dial-up modem, which shows a Conexant chip

The Modem Adapter is a dial-up modem that was included with most Dreamcast consoles sold worldwide, excluding Brazil and regions of Asia outside Japan. In Brazil, where the adapter was excluded due to the high price of the console there, it was sold separately for R$49.99 as the Dreamcast Link. European, Australian, and early Japanese models came with a 33.6 kbit/s modem, while North American and later Japanese models included a 56 kbit/s modem. However, with no region lock present, it is possible for models bundled with the 33.6 kbit/s modem to use the 56 kbit/s one instead for faster Internet access. To produce the modem, Sega partnered with Rockwell International through its semiconductor division, which was spun off as Conexant on January 4, 1999.

There are two models of the modem adapter, 670-14140A and 670-14140B. The "A" model can use power from the Dreamcast game console to allow it to operate without the need of power from the telephone line. The "B" model does not use power from the Dreamcast; thus, it is dependent on the power from the telephone line or a modem that runs power through the telephone line.

==== Custom dial-up server ====
There are multiple ways to create a server between a Dreamcast and a personal computer (PC) using the standard modem which allows the Dreamcast to share the PC's network connection.

- PC-DC Server using Windows 95/98.
- PC-DC Server using a Linux distribution like Ubuntu.
- Dial-up Network by using a LAN modem (like a Netopia R2020) with a telephone line simulator.
- PC-DC Server using Dreamcast Now software on a Raspberry Pi.

=== Broadband Adapter ===
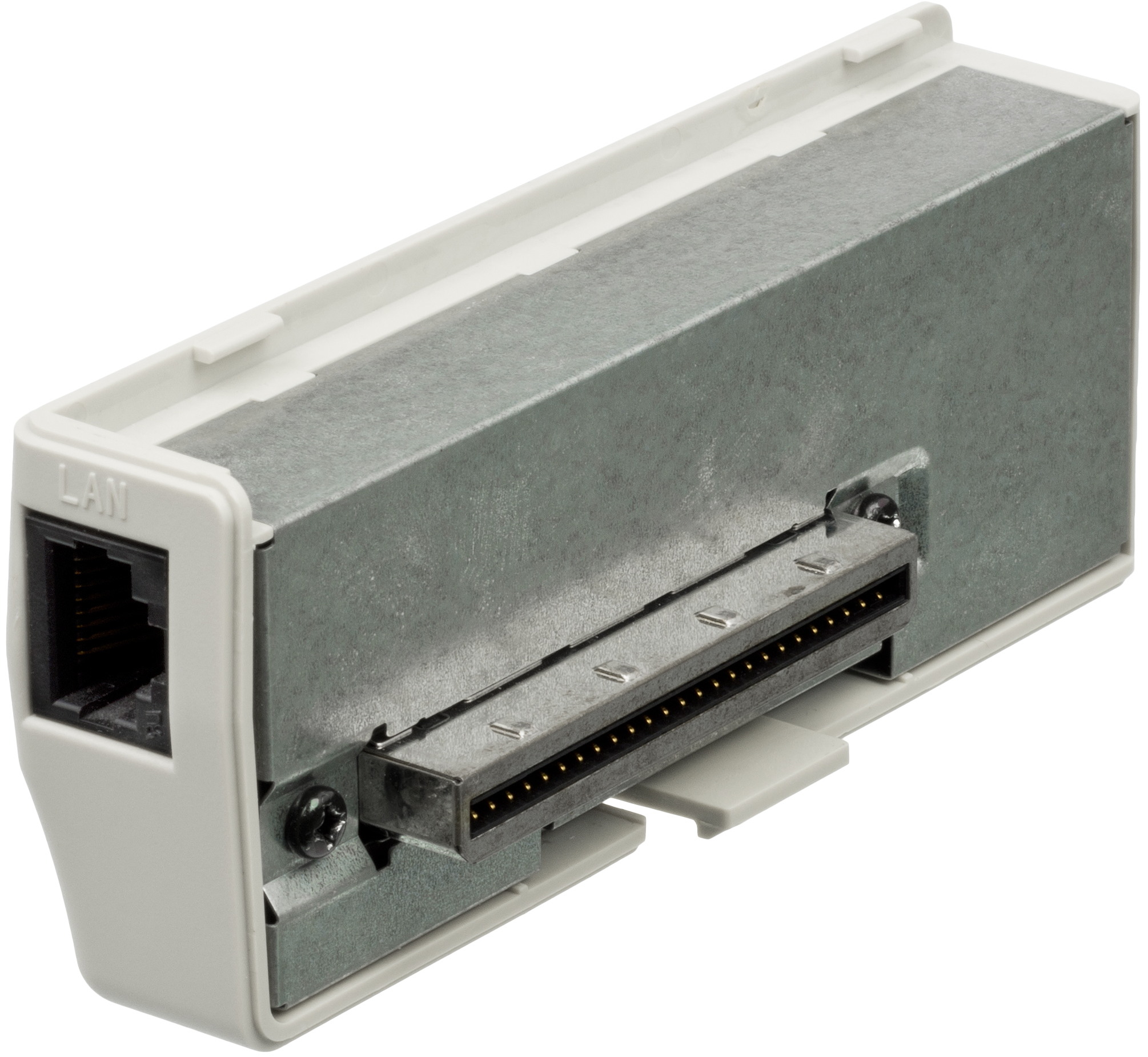
The HIT-0400 broadband adapter

The Broadband Adapter is a network adapter that was released as a separate accessory for the Dreamcast in Japan on July 15, 2000, retailing at ¥8,800; the United States followed suit on January 9, 2001, with a retail price of $59.95. CSI Co., Ltd. manufactured the adapter in Japan. The adapter was never bundled with any console; it was sold in Japan through CSI's website and cable Internet access providers, while the adapter was sold in the United States exclusively through Sega's online store from launch until March 2001, when it started appearing in retail stores. A European release for the adapter was planned for early 2001, but it ultimately did not materialize with the Dreamcast's discontinuation; despite that, use of an American (or Japanese) adapter on a PAL system is possible since the adapter is not region locked.

Only a few hundred thousand units of the Broadband Adapter were produced as worldwide broadband adoption was still poor at the time. While it was solely mass produced in white to match the console's default model color, a black model was produced on a limited build to order basis; orders were accepted throughout much of December 2001, with a minimum of 2,000 units produced from February to March 2002. Due to the adapter's launch late in the lifespan of the Dreamcast, only a handful of games supported the adapter as developers had to explicitly include support for the adapter in their games; the games that did support it were able to take advantage of the 10 and 100 Mbit speeds provided by the adapter. However, it also had an unintended consequence of much faster Dreamcast GD-ROM copying, leading to a dramatic increase in game piracy towards the end of the console's North American lifespan. CSI announced that it would discontinue production of the adapter on April 24, 2002, citing Sega's discontinuation of Dreamcast production and transition to third-party development.

It is a common misconception that the Broadband Adapter was released with two model numbers (HIT-0400 for the US, and HIT-0401 for Japan); in actuality, both Japan and US models have the code HIT-0400 and use a Realtek 8139 chip. The code HIT-0401 refers to the Japanese model's packaging and documentation, while the code HIT-0400 refers to the adapter hardware. Besides the Broadband Adapter, Sega also released the LAN Adapter in 1999 for sale in Japan only. The LAN Adapter is technically inferior compared to the Broadband Adapter as it supports only the low 10 Mbit speed with the use of a Fujitsu MB86967 chip; it is practically inferior as well since it is not compatible with any online Dreamcast games and works only with the included Japanese browser disk.

Due to the decline of dial-up networking and the rise of the more modernized, faster LAN connection, the Broadband Adapter has reached very high demand over the pre-packaged Modem Adapter. Combined with the scarcity of the adapter, this has resulted in highly inflated prices for it; as early as 2004, third-party retailers such as eBay sold the adapter alone for around $100 to $150, and it still regularly sells for more than the Dreamcast itself. Some games are still playable online via the Broadband Adapter through private servers, such as Phantasy Star Online, Toy Racer, and Quake III Arena.

== Online services ==
Unlike the Xbox Live service launched by Microsoft in 2002, Sega never had a unified worldwide service for the Dreamcast. Instead, Sega created separate regional services that were developed independently of each other, with different companies from different regions participating in the development of the services in their respective regions. Former Microsoft executive Sam Furukawa recalled in 2010 that Sega chairman Isao Okawa proposed adding Dreamcast compatibility into the Xbox several times to Microsoft chairman Bill Gates as Sega explored a sale to Microsoft after the launch of the PlayStation 2, though negotiations ultimately failed due in part to the latter balking at the former's insistence on including online gaming with supported Dreamcast titles.

=== Dricas (Japan) ===
Dricas
- Developer: Sega, ISAO Corporation
- Type: Online service
- Launched: October 28, 1998; 28 years ago
- Discontinued: September 28, 2007; 19 years ago
- Platform: Dreamcast
- Website: dricas.com at the Wayback Machine (archived October 19, 2000)

Dricas was an Internet service intended for Dreamcast consoles in Japan. The service launched the week of October 28, 1998, with only a few features such as e-mail available; the feature set expanded in the weeks preceding the Dreamcast's launch in Japan on November 27, 1998. Much of its infrastructure was developed by ISAO Corporation, which was spun-off from Sega on November 26, 1999. Its accompanying web browser, Dream Passport, provided the ability to connect via dial-up, browse the Internet, receive and send e-mail, chat with other users, and so on. The Dreameye accessory, which was only sold in Japan, added the ability to send images and videos through e-mail and video chat.

On March 30, 2000, Sega announced that Dream Passport 3, which was due for release on April 29, would include an online rental service called Dream Library, where users could download and play emulated Mega Drive and PC Engine games; a small fee was charged daily throughout the rental period of each title. Initially scheduled to launch with the browser, Sega delayed it to May 30, then delayed it again for two days due to "final testing"; the service went live at 18:00 JST on June 1 with 17 Mega Drive and 13 PC Engine titles available. Five Mega Drive titles were added to the service the same month along with 15 PC Engine titles. The service was temporarily suspended from January 27, 2001, to March 2001 due to Sega implementing compatibility with the Broadband Adapter through server modifications.

Dricas persisted until March 7, 2000, when the service was consolidated into ISAO's multi-platform online service, isao.net. Broadband support arrived for the service a few months later on July 15 of that year, launching with the debut of the Broadband Adapter in Japan. Isao.net maintained online services and game servers for the Dreamcast until Sega ceased the online servers for the last remaining Dreamcast game, Phantasy Star Online, along with its GameCube port on March 31, 2007. Sega ultimately terminated the Dreamcast-dedicated portion of the isao.net service on September 28, 2007, officially eliminating the last remaining vestige of its ambitious plan for online gaming with the Dreamcast.

=== SegaNet (United States) ===
SegaNet
- Developer: Sega, Genuity
- Type: Online service
- Launched: September 7, 2000; 26 years ago
- Discontinued: July 20, 2001; 25 years ago (online service); September 30, 2003; 23 years ago (online game servers)
- Platform: Dreamcast
- Website: sega.net at the Wayback Machine (archived June 2, 2001)

SegaNet was a short-lived Internet service geared for dial-up-based online gaming on the Dreamcast game console in the United States. The service was created by Sega in collaboration with GTE through its GTE Internetworking division, which was spun-off from GTE and renamed Genuity in the midst of development as GTE merged with Bell Atlantic to form Verizon Communications on June 30, 2000. As such, it was Genuity that ended up providing the dial-up service and network infrastructure. Sega also announced a partnership with AT&T on August 4, 1999, making the AT&T WorldNet service the preferred Internet service provider (ISP) to connect the Dreamcast online in the United States. Sega additionally announced an agreement to have Excite@Home as the exclusive portal partner for SegaNet on December 14, 1999, bringing Excite's services and content to the online platform. Microsoft participated somewhat in the development of the service, but they terminated their relationship with Sega just a few months before its launch over differences in its direction.

As a replacement for Sega's original PC-only online gaming service, Heat.net, SegaNet was initially quite popular when it launched on September 7, 2000. Just over a month after launch, by October 27, 2000, SegaNet had 1.55 million Dreamcast consoles registered online, including 750,000 in Japan, 400,000 in North America, and 400,000 in Europe. This was somewhat surprising given that Sega initially set a monthly subscription fee of $21.95, relatively expensive compared to other ISPs of the time. However, it was unavailable outside of the contiguous United States; support for Canada, Alaska, and Hawaii was planned, but never realized. Unlike a standard ISP, game servers were connected directly into SegaNet's internal network, providing very low connection latency between the consoles and servers along with standard Internet access via the included PlanetWeb browser. The browser doesn't support Adobe Flash or Java applets.

SegaNet originally offered a rebate for a free Dreamcast with a two-year contract along with a free keyboard to encourage sales of the console. However, with pressure mounting from Sony's PlayStation 2 and the announcements of Microsoft's Xbox and Nintendo's GameCube, sales of the Dreamcast continued to drop and, on July 20, 2001, Sega announced they would discontinue the service just less than 11 months after launch. At this point, all subscribers were given the option to transfer their accounts to EarthLink. Sega continued to operate the online game servers, initially removing the subscription fee for accessing them before reinstating it, albeit reduced to $9.95 per month, on November 1 of that year. They permanently eliminated the required subscription at the beginning of August 2002 with the intention of shutting down the servers by the end of that year; however, they decided to extend the service by six months, officially ending online support for most Dreamcast games effective June 2003. Sega continued to provide online support for Phantasy Star Online and Phantasy Star Online Ver. 2 until September 30, 2003; the online servers for both games were shut down at that point, officially ceasing online gaming on the Dreamcast in the United States.

=== Dreamarena (Europe) ===
Dreamarena
- Developer: Sega, BT
- Type: Online service
- Launched: October 14, 1999; 27 years ago
- Discontinued: February 28, 2003; 23 years ago
- Platform: Dreamcast
- Website: dreamarena.co.uk at the Wayback Machine (archived June 9, 2003)

Dreamarena was a free dial-up-based online gaming service provided for all Dreamcast consoles in Europe, launching with the debut of the Dreamcast in Europe on October 14, 1999. The service was created and operated for Sega Europe by a partnership between ICL, BT and various ISPs; ICL developed the web sites and software, with BT providing the dial-up capabilities and network infrastructure, and the ISPs (one for each country) providing the Internet dial-up connection and telephone service. The service was initially available in France, Germany, Italy, Spain, and the United Kingdom; it was expanded in December 2000 to include Belgium, Finland, the Netherlands, Sweden, and Switzerland. Although the service was free to access in the United Kingdom, ISPs in other European countries placed different requirements and prices for accessing it; the game servers hosted within the service were not accessible elsewhere on the Internet. Dreamarena Ltd was formed as a subsidiary of Sega Europe with around 20 staff to focus on development of the service. Some games released in Europe after the Dreamcast was discontinued did not include the online functionality present in other regions, infuriating some consumers who anticipated using the online features. The service was accessed via the DreamKey browser, which was also built into some games such as Sonic Adventure 2. As of September 2000 Sega had passed 300,000 registrations in Europe on Dreamarena, with "more than half" deemed "active or very active users".

The first three versions of DreamKey (1.0, 1.5, and 2.0) did not allow users to enter their own ISP phone number and login details, locking them with the ISPs that partnered with Sega; this resulted in Dreamarena being an expensive affair for many of the users. After the discontinuation of the Dreamcast and its transition away from console hardware, Sega closed Dreamarena on February 28, 2002; subsequent online access required version 3.0 of DreamKey, which was released on February 1 and provided users the ability to access the Internet via an ISP of their choice. Users ordering DreamKey 3.0 after the Dreamarena closure had to use a PC to visit Sega of Europe's website and order it there with their service credentials; European Dreamcast customers that failed to register for the service by its closure were completely unable to go online with the console. Online functions for the Dreamcast continued to run for another year until they were shut down on February 28, 2003.

=== Comma (Australia) ===
On November 2, 1999, Sega announced its partnership with Telstra to develop an online service for the Dreamcast in Australia through regional distributor Ozisoft. This was just weeks before the Dreamcast was supposed to launch there on November 30; the online service was ultimately unavailable at launch due in part to the signing of the ISP contract only occurring the previous day. However, it was an ironic inconvenience as the consoles initially did not ship with Internet access discs; they were detained the previous week along with much of the other supplied launch software by customs officers for lack of information about the country of origin on the packaging. Ozisoft claimed that the delay in the network launch was due to the time required for developing and testing the network on the Dreamcast hardware, which was compounded by the Dreamcast's use of a proprietary web browser. The network finally went live in mid-March 2000, with Internet access discs sent to registered Australian Dreamcast users that filled out a reply paid card shipped with the console.

To gain access to the network, Australian Dreamcast users were forced to use Telstra's Big Pond service; the Internet access disc, which had Dreamkey software similar to the European version, was bundled with a voucher for 150 hours of free Internet access that users were required to use within three months of activation. Upon connecting, the browser went to the default Comma web portal, which Sega hoped would develop similarly to Yahoo! as an all-encompassing destination for users' Internet needs; LookSmart powered the portal's search engine.

== Supported games ==
Despite the emphasis of online gaming by Sega, no games supported online play at launch despite a handful of games offering free downloadable content (DLC) to store on a VMU, including Sonic Adventure. This caused much ire among consumers such that complaints were filed to the BBC's Watchdog programme and the Independent Television Commission (ITC) in the United Kingdom, accusing Sega of misleading advertising. The ITC subsequently forced Sega to remove references to online gaming in Dreamcast advertisements, with Sega deciding to switch European advertising agencies from WCRS to Bartle Bogle Hegarty as a result of the controversy. The first game to support online play was ChuChu Rocket!, which first released in Japan on November 11, 1999.

Online games on the Dreamcast initially allowed free access to their game servers with expectations of cost offsetting through SegaNet subscriptions and game sales. Phantasy Star Online Ver. 2 was one of the exceptions to the free access, charging a monthly fee throughout the existence of its official servers. There are some private servers still online that are playable with the following games: Phantasy Star Online Ver. 1 and Phantasy Star Online Ver. 2, Sega Swirl, 4x4 Evolution, Quake III Arena, Maximum Pool, Planet Ring, Toy Racer, Starlancer, ChuChu Rocket!, The Next Tetris On-line Edition, PBA Tour Bowling 2001, Sonic Adventure, Alien Front Online, Worms World Party, Racing Simulation 2 On-line: Monaco Grand Prix, POD: Speedzone, Ooga Booga, World Series Baseball 2K2, Jet Set Radio, NCAA College Football 2K2: Road to the Rose Bowl, NFL 2K1, NFL 2K2, NBA 2K1, NBA 2K2, Internet Game Pack and Mobile Suit Gundam: Federation vs. Zeon DX, with more games upcoming.

== See also ==
=== Competing online services ===
- GameCube online functionality
- PlayStation 2 online functionality
- Xbox network

=== Prior online ventures by Sega ===
- Sega Meganet for the Mega Drive (Japan, Brazil)
- Sega Channel for the Genesis (United States)
- Sega NetLink for the Saturn
