= Voice chat in online gaming =

Real-time voice communication over a network used for gaming

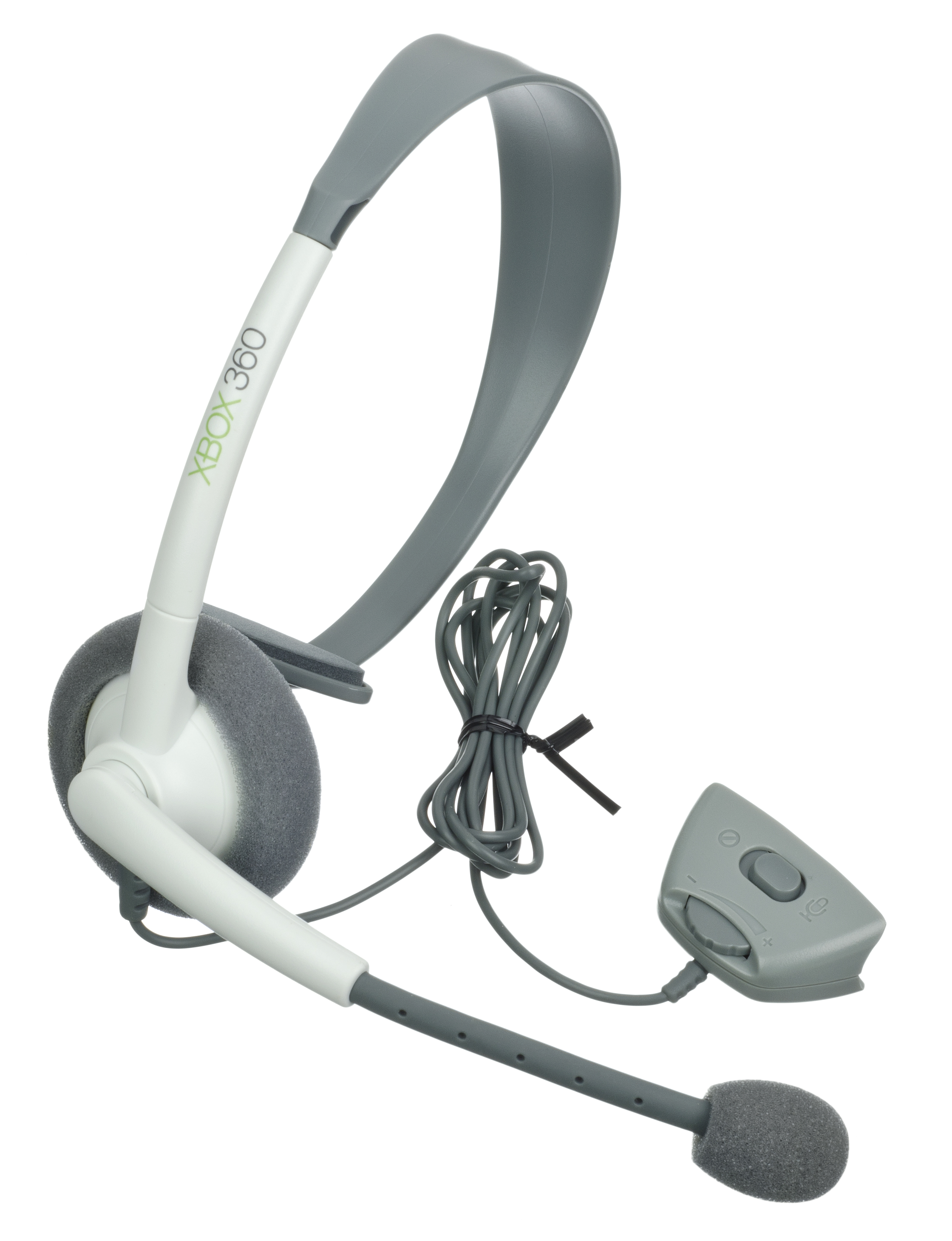
An Xbox 360 wired headset

Voice chat is telecommunication via voice over IP (VoIP) technologies—especially when those technologies are used as intercoms among players in multiplayer online games. The VoIP functionality can be built into some games, be a system-wide communication system, or a third-party chat software.

== History ==
Voice chat in video games began in the sixth generation with the Sega Dreamcast (circa 1999). Some games, including Seaman and Alien Front Online included built in voice chat functionality, though it required an active subscription to the Dreamcast's online service, SegaNet.

In 2001, Sony released the Network adapter for their PlayStation 2 video game console, which allowed voice chatting with a headset. In 2002, Microsoft launched the Xbox Live service, including support for voice chat. Later, Microsoft required all Xbox Live console game developers to integrate voice chat capability into their games and bundled a microphone and headset with the Xbox Live retail unit. In 2005, Nintendo launched the Nintendo Wi-Fi Connection, an online multiplayer service for both the Nintendo DS and for the Wii. Metroid Prime Hunters, which was released in March 2006, was the first game that allowed voice chatting through the Nintendo DS's microphone. Nintendo also released a Nintendo DS headset for voice chat alongside the release of Pokémon Diamond and Pearl (2006).

=== 2010s ===
Starting in the 2010s, third-party software have become very popular among gamers, even when in-game VoIP services are available. Notable software includes Discord, Ventrilo, TeamSpeak, and Mumble. Support for Discord was added to the Xbox Series X|S and Xbox One consoles in 2022, with support added to PlayStation 5 in 2023.

== Modern voice chat technology ==
In modern online gaming, voice chat technology has advanced features, like proximity-based and spatial audio. This technology aims to create a more immersive and realistic communication environment for players. Instead of just relying on traditional voice channels, newer implications use special cues to indicate a player's location in the game world, enhancing the realism and interactions of the voice chat audio. When a player is near another player in the game world, their voice sounds closer and is directional, like how it would be in the real world, allowing gamers to navigate complex gameplay dynamics through audio. However, this type of voice system can face problems, one of those being ensuring audio is clear in a chaotic and noisy game environment. While the improvement of special voice chat offers technical improvements for gameplay immersion, its effective use depends on thoughtful design choices and the need for balancing realistic audio communication.

== Impact ==
In online gaming, voice chat has been a great contributor to strengthening social bonds, improving teamwork, and increasing the engagement of players. Studies have found that voice chat in online games allowed connections between players with real-time coordination for cooperative games, leading to the growth of better friendships. Games that use courtesy-based mechanics, in-game benefits that encourage good behavior, are seen to have higher rates of positive speech among their players. Players were also seen to have greater trust and cooperation with other players with those who used online voice chat as vocal cues, tone, emphasis, or emotional nuances in a player's voice adds emotional depth and clarity to interactions. When voice chat in online gaming is properly moderated, it can strengthen online gaming communities as it creates a safe and beneficial environment where players feel heard and valued.

However, voice chat gaming has also been a major problem for online toxicity and harassment. Research has indicated that women and racial minorities face higher levels of verbal abuse compared to others, many of whom are compelled to avoid voice chat to escape discrimination. Games with a lack of moderation in voice chat systems create an environment where offensive language and hate speech do not have any consequences for players. Voice chat that is not moderated can lead to player disagreement, increased stress, and mental health concerns for those regularly exposed to online verbal harassment. There are attempts to stop the toxicity, such as giving rewards for those who are polite or restricting the toxic players' ability to communicate with other players. However, these attempts have faced resistance from some players as they are seen to limit the free speech of the players.

The implementation of voice chat in online gaming has caused gaming to offer both beneficial social interactions and the potential for harmful experiences. While it does enhance teamwork, friendships, and immersion among players, unmoderated use can cause widespread toxicity and exclusion. There is still the challenge of balancing free communication while providing moderation to ensure a safe space for all gamers. The negative effects of voice chat gaming are being addressed, and the positive effects are being strengthened, by researchers and players investigating various approaches, such as implementing courtesy-driven mechanics, enhancing moderation tools, and supporting community-led projects.

== See also ==
- Audio headset
- Comparison of VoIP software
- Gamergate (harassment campaign)
- Glossary of video game terms
- Griefer
- Massively multiplayer online game
- Online game
- Proximity chat
- Video game culture
- Xbox 360 Wireless Headset
