= Kevin Cleary =

Kevin Cleary may refer to:

- Kevin F. Cleary, American sound engineer
- Kevin R. Cleary, American audio specialist
