= Kevin R. Cleary =

American television producer

Kevin R. Cleary is an American-born television technical producer and broadcast audio specialist who founded Cleary Sound in 1997.

Cleary got his start in technical management and sound production at the Roseland Ballroom in New York City and began working for ESPN in 2007. During his time at ESPN, Cleary has produced and supported the X Games, NASCAR, Major League Baseball, the Indy 500, the Breeders Cup, the Open Championship, the National Football League, NCAA college football, and the CFP national championship, and has garnered multiple awards including seven Emmy awards for his work as a technical supervisor as well as senior audio producer and director.

== Awards ==
- 2023 Sports Emmy Award – Outstanding Technical Team Studio Coverage 2023 NFL draft ABC/ESPN, technical supervisor
- 2022 Sports Emmy Award – Outstanding Technical Team Event 2022 College Football National Championship Alabama Crimson Tide vs Georgia Bulldogs ESPN, technical supervisor
- 2015 Sports Emmy Award – Outstanding Trans-Media Sports Coverage 2016 College Football Playoff National Championship” Megacast-ESPN/ESPN3/ESPNU/ESPN goal line, director
- 2013 International Television and Film Awards – Best Technical Production Team "X Games Aspen 2012" ESPN, senior audio producer
- 2012 Sports Emmy Award – Outstanding Technical Team Event "Winter X Games 16" ESPN 3D, technical supervisor
- 2011 Sports Emmy Award – Outstanding Technical Team Remote "Winter X Games 15" ESPN 3D, technical supervisor
- 2011 Eclipse Award – Outstanding National Television Live Racing Programming – "The Breeders Cup" ESPN, senior audio producer
- 2011 College Sports Media Awards – Professional Live Game or Event – "2011 Rose Bowl Wisconsin vs TCU" ESPN, senior audio producer
- 2010 Eclipse Award – Outstanding National Television – Live Racing Programming – "The Breeders Cup" ESPN, senior audio producer
- 2009 Global Media Awards for College Sports – Best Live Game – College Football "#1Texas vs #7 Texas Tech” ESPN/ABC, senior audio technician
- 2009 Eclipse Award – Outstanding National Television Live Racing Programming – "The Belmont Stakes on ABC", senior audio producer
- 2008 Sports Emmy Award – Outstanding Technical Team Studio "ESPN Nascar" ABC/ESPN/ESPN2, technical supervisor
- 2007 Sports Emmy Award – Outstanding Technical Team Remote "ESPN Nascar" ABC/ESPN/ESPN2, technical supervisor

Kevin is a member of the Advanced Television Systems Committee (ATSC), the Audio Engineering Society (AES), the International Alliance of Theatrical Stage Employees IATSE Local One), and The Society of Motion Picture and Television Engineers (SMPTE).
