= Vanishing Point (video game) =

2001 video game

- North American Dreamcast cover art featuring an Alfa Romeo GTV (left) and a Lotus Elise (right)
- Developer: Clockwork Games
- Publisher: Acclaim Entertainment
- Platforms: Dreamcast, PlayStation
- Release: Dreamcast: NA: January 3, 2001; EU: January 19, 2001; PlayStation: NA: February 6, 2001; EU: March 31, 2001
- Genre: Racing
- Modes: Single-player, multiplayer

Vanishing Point is a 2001 racing video game developed by Clockwork Games and published by Acclaim Entertainment for Dreamcast and PlayStation. The game aimed to be graphically impressive so that the "vanishing point" of the race-track would be visible, and as such it was praised for its technical implementation. However, some reviews of the game were ultimately less positive due to the vehicles' slippery controls and frequent collisions.

== Gameplay ==
The main mode which is Arcade Mode is where you race against opponents in circuit races, but the goal is to finish the race with the fastest lap time which is the Vanishing Point (hence the title). The game is provided with supposedly accurate car physics, which can be experienced through various game modes, tracks and cars. The majority of content is initially locked and is progressively unlocked as you play through the game, a fact the developers later described as a "mistake" and the result of rushed development. Stunt Mode is unique in that the player must complete short courses that involve a variety of jumps, barrel rolls, chicanes and collectable balloons against a time limit.

The game includes an "Internet Challenge mode", which allows players to record their best times and post them online on a user profile. Challenges were made available through this mode, and the instruction book said prizes were awarded for best challenge players.

== Development ==
Vanishing Point was first announced at the European Computer Trade Show, being self-funded by Clockwork Games until Acclaim licensed the game. The game was developed in 18 months with a team of eight people. Neil Casini, director of Clockwork Games, told Official Dreamcast Magazine that they had adopted the game's title as a reference to their efforts to "create a rendering engine that had no pop-up or 'fogging' as far as the eye could see, i.e. the vanishing point". Casini told the magazine that in developing the gameplay they had sought to "emulate and combine the driving model from Sega Rally with the exaggerated reality of Scud Race". The developers had three key features in mind when making the game: realistic vehicle dynamics, dynamically adapting artificial intelligence, and solid technical performance (which meant draw distance with no pop-in and 30 frames per second (FPS) rendering on the PS1 and 60 FPS on the Dreamcast).

== Reception ==
Reception

Aggregate score
Aggregator	Score	
Aggregator	Dreamcast	PS
Metacritic	80/100	68/100

Review scores
Publication	Score	
Publication	Dreamcast	PS
AllGame	3.5/5	2/5
CNET Gamecenter	8/10	N/A
Edge	3/10	N/A
Electronic Gaming Monthly	6/10 (Note: Three critics of Electronic Gaming Monthly gave the Dreamcast version each a score of 6/10, 5/10, and 7/10.)	6/10
EP Daily	8.5/10	N/A
Game Informer	7.5/10	N/A
GameRevolution	N/A	D+
GameSpot	8.1/10	7.4/10
GameSpy	89% (PD) 8/10	N/A
GameZone	N/A	6/10
IGN	8.6/10	4.5/10
Next Generation	3/5	N/A
Official U.S. PlayStation Magazine	N/A	3.5/5

The Dreamcast version of Vanishing Point received "favorable" reviews, while the PlayStation version received "average" reviews, according to the review aggregation website Metacritic. Greg Orlando of NextGen called the former console version "an example of fine craftsmanship." PlanetDreamcast gave the same console version a favorable review, over two months before the latter was released in the United States.

While writers for Electronic Gaming Monthly praised the game for its graphics and framerate, they considered the gameplay frustrating due to the slippery, floaty controls. The reviewers were discouraged at dealing with the slow-moving traffic in the game, particularly the slow Volkswagen bus and small Volkswagen beetle. Edge Magazine similarly noted that every car in the game has "a ridiculous amount of rear-end swing," making control impossible at speed, and too was frustrated by the AI-controlled vehicles frequently ramming into the player. Matt Grandstaff of Allgame said that players will inevitably only swerve back and forth while driving and that it is impossible to recover from a spin with the game's gear shifting system. Alex Tsotsos of SportPlanet said that "It takes a while to get used to the sloppy control of the vehicles you start the game with, but eventually you get used to it and get cars that handle better," and noted that the game physics shown off in collisions is where the game excels. GameSpot also noted the troublesome traffic and "hypersensitive" controls, but presented them as elements a player must adjust to.

Edge Magazine praised Vanishing Point's Stunt mode. While noted to be clearly inspired by Crazy Taxi, the magazine said that "fun gleamed from this mode eclipses that of the main game tenfold." Matt Grandstaff also said that Stunt mode is the most exciting part of the game, but that eventually it "is nothing more than an outlandish take on the objectives one goes through to achieve new licenses in Gran Turismo."

In 2006, Frank Provo of GameSpot said that the PlayStation version lacks the "crisp resolution" of the DreamCast original and that its sound-effects seem more "muffled," but that these faults do not get in the way of the overall experience. Provo called the game "one of the most original and enjoyable racing games to come around in a long time."
