= Xbox 360 Wireless Headset =

Wireless headset for the Xbox 360

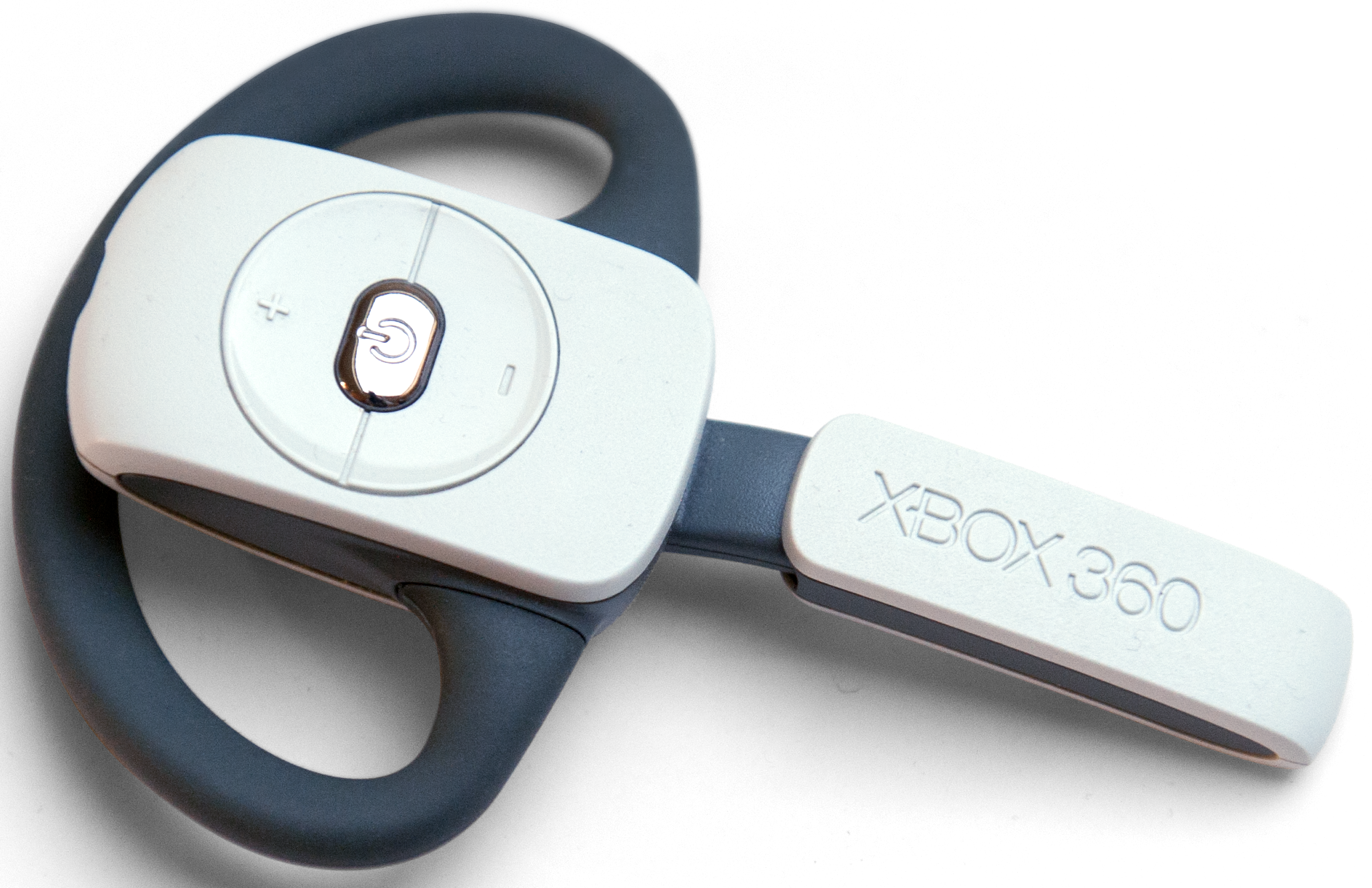
- An Xbox 360 Wireless Headset
- Manufacturer: Microsoft
- Type: Gaming headset
- Generation: Seventh generation era
- Lifespan: NA: November 22, 2005; EU: November 24, 2006
- Connectivity: Wireless (proprietary 2.4 GHz protocol)
- Power: NiMH battery
- Dimensions: 97 × 71 × 22 mm 3.82 × 2.8 × 0.87 inches (with "medium" earloop)

The Xbox 360 Wireless Headset is a wireless headset designed for the Xbox 360 and Xbox Live; it is manufactured by Microsoft. It can be used for in game voice chat, private chat, audio for video chat and in game voice recognition. Up to four wireless headsets can be used simultaneously on a single Xbox 360. The headset fits over either ear and comes with two sizes of removable earloops for a better fit. It uses the same 2.4 GHz wireless technology as the Xbox 360 Wireless Controller, so it will work within 30 feet of the console. It can achieve up to eight hours of battery life per charge, with an AC wall adapter or a USB DC charger for recharging. USB chargers are readily available from mobile phone accessory shops. The headset can be used with or without a controller. The headset also produces various beeps to signal different actions and give messages to the user. The headset is also compatible for use with a PC via the Microsoft Wireless Receiver. Up to 4 wireless headsets and wireless controllers can be used in conjunction at any one time. The number lit up on the headset will correspond to the quadrant lit up on the controller.

== Features ==
- Buttons to control volume, power and mute functions
- Sync Button to connect to an Xbox 360 console or (Crossfire) Wireless Gaming Receiver
- Port to connect to the AC or DC Adapter (included in package)
- 4 LEDs used to indicate which controller the headset is associated with and its status during charging.
- Volume level of headset is noticeably louder at its highest volume than the wired Xbox 360 headset.

== Versions ==
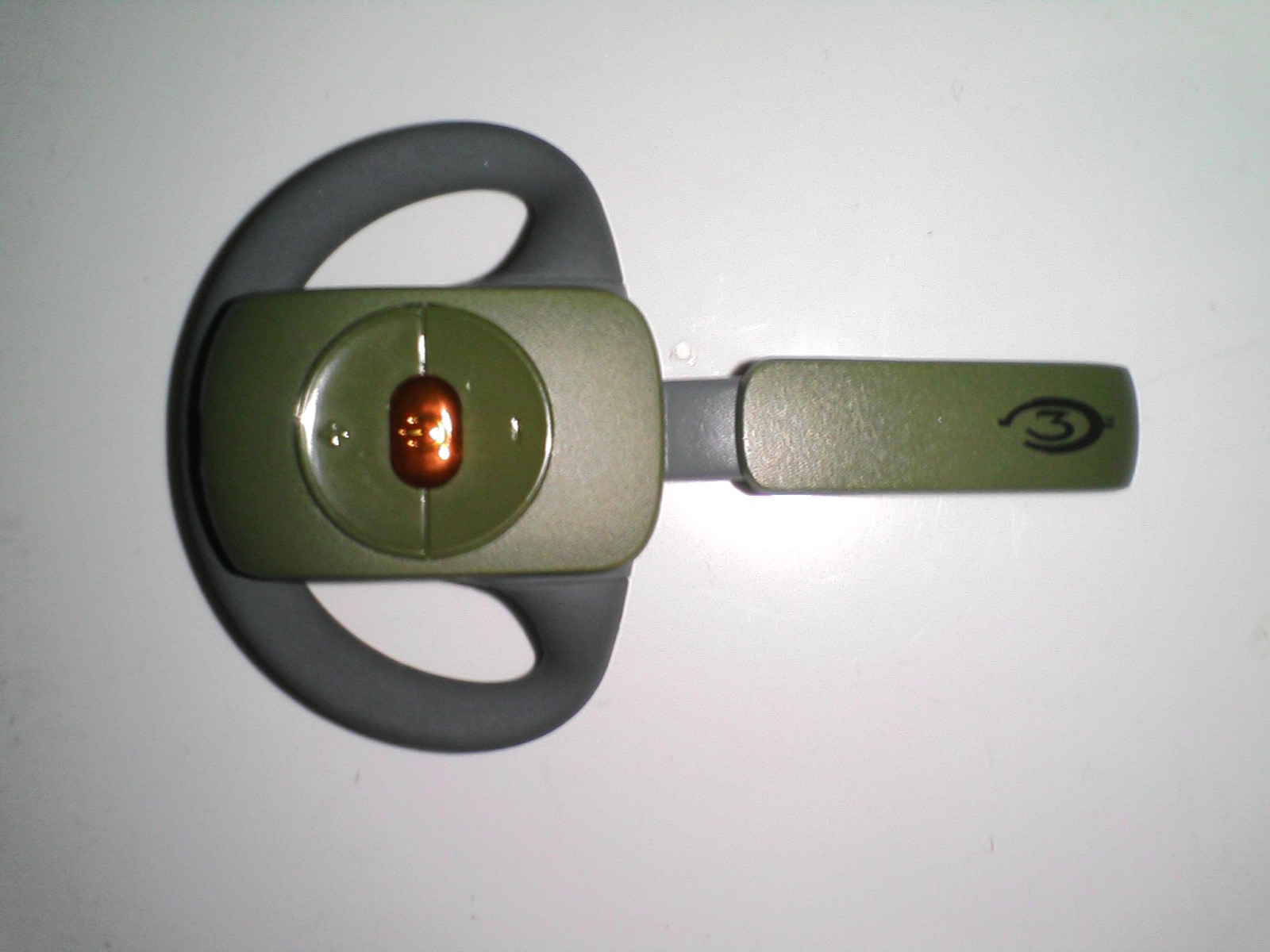
Halo 3 Wireless Headset

The wireless headset is available as standard in white/grey. In conjunction with the release of Halo 3, Microsoft released a Halo 3 themed Wireless Headset. To coincide with the launch of the Xbox 360 S a black Wireless Headset was made available, and Halo: Reach themed Wireless Headsets were released alongside the game.

Another headset, Microsoft's LifeChat ZX-6000, is based on the same design and hardware as the Xbox 360 wireless headset. It differs only in that it has noise-canceling microphones, a black case and slight shape differences in the buttons and branding. The LifeChat ZX-6000 ships with a black Wireless Gaming Receiver.

== Issues ==
Some problems have been reported by users of the headsets. One issue reported is that the headset may not be able to be used with some controllers. Other users have reported the headset losing its connection with the console during use.

Microsoft has issued a statement saying that they are aware of some problems and that users should contact Xbox Support for help. Despite this, many consumers have found that call centre staff at Microsoft are not instructed on how to resolve these issues.

== See also ==
- Xbox 360 accessories
- Xbox 360
- Xbox 360 controller
- Bluetooth
