= Ray Cox (gamer) =

American video game player

- Born: Livonia, Michigan
- Other name: Stallion83
- Years active: 2006–present
- Known for: Xbox Gamerscore

Ray Cox IV, known online as Stallion83, is a video game player known for his high Xbox Gamerscore, points for completing in-game challenges known as achievements. He was the first player to reach 1,000,000 points in early 2014. He held the position as early as 2008 and was later recognized as the Guinness World Record holder. Microsoft presented him with a lifetime Xbox Live subscription in late 2013. He livestreamed his 1,000,000 milestone to 8,000 viewers online. As his next goal, Cox wanted to pursue every Xbox One achievement. After a decade atop the leaderboard, he was overtaken in mid-2017 by another user known as Stephen “smrnov” Rowe near the 1.6 million point mark. Cox reached 2,000,000 Gamerscore, a world record, in late 2018. Since April 2019, he no longer holds the Guinness World Record for the highest Xbox Gamerscore.
