= NCAA College Football 2K3 =

2002 video game

- Xbox box art
- Developers: Visual Concepts; Avalanche Software
- Publisher: Sega of America
- Platforms: GameCube, PlayStation 2, Xbox
- Release: PlayStation 2: NA: August 6, 2002; Xbox: NA: August 13, 2002; GameCube: NA: September 3, 2002
- Genre: Sports football
- Modes: Single-player, multiplayer

NCAA College Football 2K3 is a 2002 American football video game published by Sega. The cover athlete is former Nebraska Cornhuskers quarterback Eric Crouch. It is the second college football game by Visual Concepts and Avalanche Software (the first being NCAA College Football 2K2: Road to the Rose Bowl).

== Reception ==
Reception

Aggregate score
Aggregator	Score		
Aggregator	GameCube	PS2	Xbox
Metacritic	70/100	71/100	70/100

Review scores
Publication	Score		
Publication	GameCube	PS2	Xbox
Electronic Gaming Monthly	N/A	6.5/10	N/A
GamePro	N/A	4.5/5	N/A
GameSpot	7.8/10	7.9/10	7.9/10
GameSpy	3.5/5	3.5/5	4/5
GameZone	8/10	N/A	N/A
IGN	6.4/10	6.8/10	6.8/10
Nintendo Power	3.8/5	N/A	N/A
Official U.S. PlayStation Magazine	N/A	2.5/5	N/A
PlayStation: The Official Magazine	N/A	7/10	N/A

The game received "average" reviews on all platforms according to the review aggregation website Metacritic.
