= Official Dreamcast Magazine (UK magazine) =

Video game magazine

- Categories: Video games magazines
- Frequency: Monthly/bimonthly
- First issue: September 1999
- Final issue Number: July/August 2001; 21
- Company: Dennis Publishing
- Country: United Kingdom
- Language: English
- ISSN: 1467-6265

Official Dreamcast Magazine (commonly abbreviated as ODM) was a video game magazine published by Dennis Publishing in the United Kingdom between 1999 and 2001. The magazine held the license for the Sega Dreamcast console in the UK and featured a DreamOn demo disc on almost every cover. The magazine also featured complete games Sega Swirl and Planet Ring on its front cover. Early issues also covered fashion related to Dreamcast.

== History ==
London-based Dennis Publishing won the licence to publish the official Dreamcast magazine in the UK in 1999, taking over from EMAP who held the licence for the official magazine for Sega's previous console, the Sega Saturn.

The magazine launched with a "special issue" on 2 September 1999, a month before the European launch of the Dreamcast in October 1999. Writing his column in this issue Editor-in-Chief Mark Higham stated his intent to "create a stylish magazine that reflects the stylish nature of the Dreamcast", with an emphasis on reader interaction "inspired by the multiplayer side of the console". Before launch Dennis Publishing stated that their intended target market was "predominantly, but not exclusively, 22–30 year old males, who may or may not have an existing interest in gaming." Issue 1, which was published on 30 September 1999, featured Shenmue and Ready 2 Rumble Boxing on its cover.

Mark Higham resigned his position as Editor-in-Chief in February 2000 to launch media magazine Create, and was replaced by Warren Chrismas, who had served as Features Editor with the magazine since its launch.

In July 2001 Chrismas announced the intention for future issues to publish on "flexible release schedule", with the next issue in two months time, but Dennis Publishing discontinued the title before this reached market. The magazine's circulation peaked at 52,157 between July–December 2000, but by the time of its discontinuation had fallen to 46,294.

== Planet Ring ==
Planet Ring is a video game developed and published by Sega for the Dreamcast home game console on 4 December 2000 in Europe only. The disc was distributed for free in the United Kingdom through the Official Dreamcast Magazine and was one of the few games released in PAL regions to support the Dreamcast Microphone as well as the Dreamcast Keyboard.

The Planet Ring game experience is like an online community as it is one of the first video games to require the user to be connected to the internet at all times, predating Microsoft's Xbox Live. The game contains four online minigames to help promote the Dreamcast's internet features. These minigames include "Dream Dorobo", "Ball Bubble", "SOAR" and "Splash". Up to 32 players could compete in online events. Before being allowed to play online for the very first time, the player must design a small character with various specifics like sex, hair design, clothing, age, intelligence and a few other factors. This character represents the player in the world of Planet Ring. The character can be seen on the planet surface and can run around the entire globe visiting the varying attractions.

Unlike other games that allowed the use of the Dreamcast Broadband Adapter (BBA), this game was dial-up only. The game was playable across the whole continent of Europe so players in the UK could play people from France, Spain, Germany, etc. Although the original Dreamcast online servers were shut down in 2002, the game has been brought back online due to a homebrew server development in June 2013. This new server was due to an open-source server project called Earthcall which was developed by using the SDL.net library.

== See also ==
- DC-UK
