= Ooga Booga =

2001 video game

- Developer: Visual Concepts
- Publisher: Sega
- Producer: John Race
- Programmers: Nathan Bamberger; Evan Harsha; Mark Roberts
- Artists: Collin Fogel; Leandro Peñaloza; Marten Lundsten
- Composers: Brian Luzietti; Larry Peacock
- Platform: Dreamcast
- Release: NA: September 11, 2001
- Genres: Action, party
- Modes: Single-player, multiplayer

Ooga Booga is a 2001 online party video game developed by Visual Concepts and published by Sega for the Dreamcast. It focuses on the combat of "Kahunas" using thrown shrunken heads, riding animals, staffs, or using spells. The game received positive reviews from video game critics.

== Gameplay ==
Gameplay screenshot.

The storyline is that Ooga Booga is a volcano goddess that creates islands, and has leaders of tribes, the Kahunas, that battle for her favour. It has a distinct Polynesian style and tone, and has many multiplayer islands and characters which can be unlocked. It was one of the last online games for the Dreamcast. There are four basic Kahunas that the player can use: Hottie (balanced), Fatty (strong), Twitchy (fast), and Hoodoo (spells). There are other unlockable Kahunas based on the main four. Some of them include Death, Abe (former U.S. President Abraham Lincoln), Superguy (superhero), disco guy, a leprechaun, and a dwarf.

The game has multiple creatures which players may take advantage of: boars and birds, which can be ridden on; and Tikis, which attack other players and their Tikis, once claimed.

=== Game types ===
The game has three different game modes, which the manual refers to as game types. The types are as follows:

- Smakahuna, in which players earn points for attacking other players in various ways.
- Rodeo, in which players can only earn points for attacking players while riding a boar.
- Boar Polo

== Development and release ==
Ooga Booga was developed by Visual Concepts and published by Sega. The game started out as a real time strategy game about a horse-man converting village tribes to your side through magic spells, It was later made into an arena fighter instead. The game was first announced during Sega Gamer's Day 2000. It previously had the tentative title of "Resurrection". The game was showcased at Sega's E3 2001. The title included copy protection.

On January 26, 2018, private server support was enabled by the Dreamcast Live community, making it possible to play the game online once again.

== Reception ==
Reception

Aggregate score
Aggregator	Score
Metacritic	81/100

Review scores
Publication	Score
Electronic Gaming Monthly	7/10 (Note: Three critics of Electronic Gaming Monthly gave the game each a score of 8/10, 6/10, and 7/10.)
EP Daily	7.5/10
Game Informer	6/10
GameSpot	7.2/10
GameSpy	80%
IGN	9.4/10
Next Generation	4/5
X-Play	4/5
Playboy	70%

Ooga Booga received "generally favorable" reviews according to the review aggregation website Metacritic. The Los Angeles Times compared the game to Ico for the PlayStation 2. Gary Whitta of NextGen called it "A tasty slice of lightweight party fun that proves there's life in Dreamcast yet." Star Dingo of GamePro said, "Ooga Booga's spell unleashes more chaos than strategy, yet the sheer cartoonish energy of it all could easily turn these island festivities into a regular tribal custom." (Note: GamePro gave the game three 3.5/5 scores for graphics, sound, and control, and 4/5 for fun factor.)
