= PBA Tour Bowling 2001 =

2000 video game

- Developer: Bethesda Softworks
- Publisher: Bethesda Softworks
- Platforms: Dreamcast, Windows
- Release: 2000
- Modes: Single-player,multiplayer

PBA Tour Bowling 2001 is a 2000 bowling sports-based video game developed and published by Bethesda Softworks. The game is licensed by the Professional Bowlers Association.

== Gameplay ==
The game features 3D full-motion computer generated skeletal models with the likenesses of actual veteran and star professional PBA bowlers using motion captured movements, available as playable characters and AI opponents. This game was designed to help both novices and professionals improve their bowling skills by playing against the AI computer models. Players can create and customize their own bowlers and balls by features such as appearance, strike ball, and spare ball using an extensive "Create-A-Bowler" feature in the options menu. The physics model allows the bowler and ball to react and move as they would in real life, and while the players have full control over the spin, aim, and power of the ball, the bowler's technique affects the direction and effectiveness. The interface of the game uses a system that sets power, accuracy, and backspin variables.

The lanes are modeled after real PBA alleys, which will degrade as play continues over time, which will require players to adjust to the wear and tear. The game uses fly-by cameras to show several different camera angles including overhead or third-person, so players can study their technique using replays at different positions including execution and follow-through.

The game includes practice games, team games, tournaments, and versus modes, and supports single-player and multiplayer online games. The game supports multiplayer play over the Internet for up to four players, using GameSpy technology intended to allow players using either PC or Sega Dreamcast to compete against each other. Players on PC link up through LAN/TCP-IP support, while players on Dreamcast engage in online play via its 56k modem. Inclusion of network support allows players to track world rankings, championships, and more.

== Development ==
The game was announced in May 2000 for the Sega Dreamcast. The PC version of the game went gold in November 2000.

== Reception ==
Reception

Review scores
Publication	Score
All Game Guide	2/5
IGN	5.6/10

IGN rated the game a 5.6 out of 10 stating"Granted, that's more than a certain predecessor can claim, but as the situation stands, it ain't a ballsy enough proposition to convince enthusiastic bowlers to part with their precious pesos"
