= NCAA College Football 2K2: Road to the Rose Bowl =

2001 video game

- North American Dreamcast cover art
- Developers: Visual Concepts; Avalanche Software
- Publisher: Sega of America
- Platform: Dreamcast
- Release: NA: August 28, 2001
- Genre: Sports
- Modes: Single player, Multiplayer

NCAA College Football 2K2: Road to the Rose Bowl, also known as simply NCAA College Football 2K2, is an American football video game developed by Visual Concepts and Avalanche Software, in association with Sega. It was released in 2001 for the Sega Dreamcast. The cover athlete is former Purdue standout quarterback Drew Brees.

The game was the first of two college football games developed by Visual Concepts and Avalanche Software, the second being NCAA College Football 2K3. The game features season mode, hopefully leading up to the Rose Bowl, and Legacy Mode, where the player can follow their team for a few years. It also features online play and customizable plays, players, and teams. The Sugar, Orange, and Fiesta bowls are not licensed although all other bowls represented are.

The game and the rest of the 2K titles on the Dreamcast have had their online components revived and are completely playable online.

== Reception ==
Reception

Aggregate score
Aggregator	Score
Metacritic	78/100

Review scores
Publication	Score
Electronic Gaming Monthly	7.5/10
Game Informer	8/10
GameSpot	8.5/10
GameSpy	8/10
IGN	7.8/10

The game received "generally favorable reviews" according to the review aggregation website Metacritic.
