= Mobile Suit Gundam: Federation vs. Zeon =

2001 video game

- Developer: Capcom
- Publishers: Arcade; Banpresto; Consoles; Bandai
- Designer: Atsushi Tomita
- Composer: Etsuko Yoneda
- Series: Mobile Suit Gundam
- Platforms: Arcade (NAOMI), Dreamcast, PlayStation 2
- Release: Arcade: JP: March 26, 2001; PlayStation 2: JP: December 6, 2001; NA: September 9, 2002; EU: November 29, 2002; Dreamcast: JP: April 11, 2002
- Genres: Action, Mecha simulation, Third-person shooter, Hack and slash, Air combat simulation (for air-type Mobile Armors only) and Naval combat simulation (for Grublo only)
- Modes: Arcade, Versus Mode, Mission/Campaign and Network (Japan only)
- Arcade system: Sega NAOMI

Mobile Suit Gundam: Federation vs. Zeon (Note: Japanese: 機動戦士ガンダム 連邦VS.ジオン, Hepburn: Kidō Senshi Gandamu Renpō VS. Jion) is a 2001 arcade video game based on the anime television series Mobile Suit Gundam. An upgraded compilation of the game, called Kidō Senshi Gundam: Renpō vs. Zeon & DX (Note: Japanese: 機動戦士ガンダム 連邦VS.ジオン&DX, Hepburn: Kidō Senshi Gandamu Renpō VS. Jion & DX) includes 360-degree, zero-G space battlefields. Both versions were later ported to home video game consoles, the Dreamcast receiving a two-in-one pack of both the original and DX and PlayStation 2 only receiving a port of DX.

== Gameplay ==
The game follows the Universal Century (UC) Gundam time line and takes place during the infamous One Year War. The player is able to pilot various mobile suits and characters from the original Mobile Suit Gundam television series. There are three gaming modes: Arcade mode, Versus mode, and Campaign mode. Arcade mode allows to select two mobile suits depending on the side of the conflict chosen (Earth Federation or Principality of Zeon).

The first mobile suit chosen is used for ground combat, while the second one is used in space environments. Versus mode allows two players to play on the same or opposing sides, with various maps and mobile suits available to choose from. The Campaign mode is centered on a player named soldier in the One Year War who combats the opposing side. Although in Campaign mode different mobile suits are unlocked as the campaign progresses. New mobile suits can be received by participating in test missions that involve that particular mobile suit. Exceptions are any captured enemy mobile suits, the Project V units (Gundam, RX-75 Guntank, and Guncannon), as well as all of Char Aznable's custom mobile suits (MS-06S Zaku II, MSM-07S Char's Z'Gok, MS-14S Char's Gelgoog, and MSN-02 Zeong).

Once Campaign Mode is defeated once, Extra Mode is unlocked, in which the player is granted top-notch allied mobile suits and all mobile suits from the opposing side as well (i.e. a Zeon pilot can use GM, a Federation suit). However, the AI becomes much harder than normal mode and if a suit is destroyed, it is not replaced. Also awarded when beating the regular Campaign Mode is the availability of all Mobile Suits in Versus and Arcade Modes.

== Characters ==
=== Playable pilot characters ===
There are a total of default playable 15 pilot characters in Arcade and Versus modes.

Earth Federation Space Forces	Principality of Zeon
Amuro Ray	Char Aznable
Kai Shiden	Ramba Ral
Hayato Kobayashi	Gaia
Ryu Jose	Mash
**Sayla Mass**	Ortega
Sleggar Law	M'Quve
	Lalah Sune
	Dozle Zabi
	Garma Zabi

=== Supporting crew characters ===
There are a total of 10 supporting crew characters Arcade, Campaign and Versus modes.

Earth Federation Space Forces	Principality of Zeon
Bright Noa	Crowley Hamon
**Sayla Mass**	Kycilia Zabi*
Fraw Bow	Gihren Zabi*
Mirai Yashima	Dren*
Matilda Ajan	
Johann Abraham Revil*	

* Denotes only available in the Campaign mode
Bold denotes double roles (playable pilot and supporting crew)

== Playable stages ==
The game features 23 official stages based on the Mobile Suit Gundam animation series are:

No.	Type	Country/Galaxy	Stage	Arcade mode	Versus and Campaign mode
1	Colony	Side 7 Galaxy	Inside Side 7	Yes	Yes
2	Space	Luna Galaxy	Luna II	No	Yes
3	Space	Satellite Orbit Galaxy	Satellite Orbit 1	Yes	Yes
4	Earth	United States	Great Canyon	Yes	Yes
5	Earth	United States	New Yark	Yes	Yes
6	Earth	United States	Seattle	No	Yes
7	Earth	Japan/Pacific Community	Doan's Island (Pacific Ocean)	No	Yes
8	Earth	People's Republic of China	Taklamakan Desert	Yes	Yes
9	Earth	Nepal	Himalayas	No	Yes
10	Earth	Turkey	Forest In Eastern Europe	Yes	Yes
11	Earth	Ukraine	Odessa	Yes	Yes
12	Earth	United Kingdom/ Northern Ireland	Belfast	Yes	Yes
13	Earth	NATO	Atlantic Ocean	No	Yes
14	Earth	Brazil	Outside Jaburo	Yes	Yes
15	Earth	Brazil	Inside Jaburo	Yes	Yes
16	Space	Satellite Orbit Galaxy	Satellite Orbit 2	Yes	Yes
17	Space	Side 6 Galaxy	Side 6 Space	Yes	Yes
18	Space	Solomon Galaxy	Solomon Space	Yes	Yes
19	Space	Solomon Galaxy	Solomon	Yes	Yes
20	Colony	Texas Galaxy	Texas Colony	No	Yes
21	Space	A Baoa Qu Galaxy	A Baoa Qu Space	Yes	Yes
22	Space	A Baoa Qu Galaxy	Outside A Baoa Qu	Yes	Yes
23	Space	A Baoa Qu Galaxy	Inside A Baoa Qu	Yes	Yes

== Reception ==
Reception

Aggregate score
Aggregator	Score	
Aggregator	Dreamcast	PS2
Metacritic	N/A	73/100

Review scores
Publication	Score	
Publication	Dreamcast	PS2
Edge	N/A	8/10
Electronic Gaming Monthly	N/A	8/10
Famitsu	32/40	32/40
Game Informer	N/A	8/10
GamePro	N/A	4/5
GameSpot	N/A	7.4/10
GameZone	N/A	6/10
IGN	N/A	7/10
Official U.S. PlayStation Magazine	N/A	3.5/5
X-Play	N/A	3/5

The PlayStation 2 version received "average" reviews according to the review aggregation website Metacritic.

In Japan, Famitsu gave both the PS2 and Dreamcast versions each a score of 32 out of 40. Game Machine listed the arcade version of Mobile Suit Gundam: Federation vs. Zeon in their May 1, 2001, issue as the most popular arcade game of the month; twelve issues later, it also listed Mobile Suit Gundam: Federation vs. Zeon DX in the same way in their November 1, 2001, issue. It went on to be the fourth highest-grossing arcade software of 2001 in Japan. Mobile Suit Gundam: Federation vs. Zeon also ranked tenth placed for the Japanese overall highest-grossing arcade game of 2001, blocked from the top five by Virtua Striker 2 ver. 2000, Shakatto Tambourine, and Time Crisis 2.
