= Xbox network =

Online multiplayer gaming and digital media delivery service by Microsoft

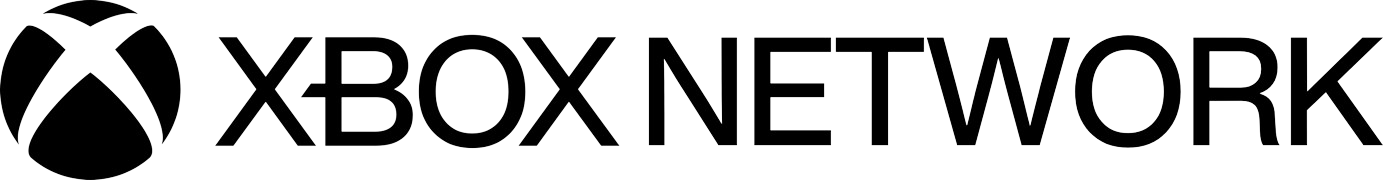
- Developer: Xbox (Microsoft)
- Type: Online service
- Launched: November 15, 2002; 24 years ago
- Platforms: Current: Xbox 360; Xbox One; Xbox Series X/S; Windows 10/11; iOS; iPadOS; Android; Discontinued: Xbox (April 15, 2010); Windows XP/Vista/7 (August 9, 2022); Windows Phone (May 16, 2022); Windows 8.x (2023)
- Status: Active
- Members: 120 million (as of January 2023)
- Pricing model: Free for Xbox network $9.99/month for Xbox Game Pass Essential $14.99/month for Xbox Game Pass Premium $22.99/month for Xbox Game Pass Ultimate
- Website: xbox.com/live

The Xbox network, formerly known and commonly referred to as Xbox Live, is an online multiplayer gaming and digital media delivery service created and operated by Xbox for the latter's brand. It was first made available to the original Xbox console on November 15, 2002. An updated version of the service, adding the Xbox Live Marketplace, became available with the Xbox 360 console launch in November 2005, and a further enhanced version was released in 2013 with the Xbox One. The service is used on the latest Xbox Series X and Series S and, in addition to a Microsoft account, is the account for Xbox ecosystem; accounts can store games and other content.

The service was extended in 2007 across the Windows platform, named Games for Windows – Live, now defunct, which made most aspects of the system available on Windows computers. The Microsoft Store and Xbox app are now used to cross over the Xbox ecosystem into PC gaming, in addition to handhelds and mobile phones as part of the Play Anywhere initiative. Microsoft's former mobile operating system, Windows Phone, included full Xbox Live functionality until it was discontinued. The service shut down for the original Xbox on April 15, 2010, and original Xbox Games are now only playable online through Insignia, an unofficial Xbox Live replacement service, or through local area network (LAN) tunneling applications.

Xbox network service is available as both a free service and a subscription-based service known as Xbox Game Pass Essential. In 2021, Microsoft renamed Xbox Live as simply the "Xbox network" to cover all of its services related to Xbox, and began slowly phasing out all "Live" branding until it was fully removed in 2023.

== Availability ==
Worldwide Xbox network availability

The Xbox network is available in the following 41 countries and territories:

seven in the Americas:

- Argentina*
- Brazil
- Canada
- Chile*
- Colombia*
- Mexico
- United States

one in Africa:

- South Africa

nine in the Asia-Pacific region:

- Australia
- China
- Hong Kong
- India
- Japan
- New Zealand
- Singapore
- South Korea
- Taiwan

21 in Europe:

- Austria
- Belgium
- Czech Republic
- Denmark
- Finland
- France
- Germany
- Greece
- Hungary
- (Republic of Ireland) Ireland
- Italy
- Netherlands
- Norway
- Poland
- Portugal
- Slovakia
- Spain
- Sweden
- Switzerland
- Turkey
- United Kingdom

three in the Middle East

- Israel
- Saudi Arabia*
- United Arab Emirates*

'*' = Country where Xbox network and Store are officially available, but the Store is in Global currency USD, not in local currency.

Users from other countries are not officially supported, although it is possible for them to access Xbox network if they provide an address located in a country where Xbox network is officially available. The country selected during account creation affects the payment options, content, and services available to the user. Previously, users were unable to change their account region, but in October 2012, Microsoft introduced an account migration tool as a pilot project, which allows the user to change their region and maintain their Xbox network profile. Subscriptions, such as that for Xbox Music, cannot be transferred with this method.

On May 18, 2011, Microsoft announced that it planned to launch Xbox network in the Middle East within the next twelve months, but it never occurred during that time period. However, on October 20, 2012, Microsoft officially announced the service would be launching in the United Arab Emirates and Saudi Arabia in three days. On November 4, Microsoft announced that the service would be launched on November 29 in Argentina and Israel. The service also appeared in the following month in Slovakia and Turkey. The service was launched in China without Game Pass in late 2014.

On March 5, 2022, the Xbox team announced that it suspended all Xbox network services in Russia in response to the 2022 Russian invasion of Ukraine.

== History ==
=== Launch with the original Xbox ===
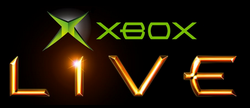
The first Xbox Live logo, used from 2002 until 2010

As Microsoft developed the original Xbox console, online gaming was designated as one of the key pillars for the greater Xbox strategy. Sega had made an attempt to capitalize on the ever-growing online gaming scene when it launched the Dreamcast video game console in 1999, including online support as standard, with the SegaNet service in North America and Dreamarena in Europe. Nevertheless, due to lack of widespread broadband adoption at the time, the Dreamcast shipped with only a dial-up modem while a later-released broadband adapter was neither widely supported nor widely available. Downloadable content was available, though limited in size due to the narrowband connection and the size limitations of a memory card. The PlayStation 2 did not initially ship with built-in networking capabilities.

Microsoft, however, hoped that the Xbox would succeed where the Dreamcast had failed. The company determined that intense online gaming required the throughput of a broadband connection and the storage space of a hard disk drive, and thus these features would be vital to the new platform. This would allow not only for significant downloadable content, such as new levels, maps, weapons, challenges and characters, to be downloaded quickly and stored, but also would make it possible to standardize bandwidth-intensive features such as voice communication. Steve Ballmer and Bill Gates both had a vision of making premium downloadable content and add-ons that would attract many new customers. Based on this reasoning, the console included a standard Ethernet port (10/100) in order to provide connectivity to common broadband networks, but did not include a modem or any dial-up support, and its online service was designed to support broadband users only. Critics scoffed at it, citing poor broadband adoption at the turn of the century.

When the Xbox launched on November 15, 2001, the as-yet unnamed online service was destined for a Summer 2002 deployment. Xbox Live was finally given a name at E3 2002 when the service was unveiled in its entirety. Sound-dampened booths and broadband-connected Xbox consoles—featuring an early version of Unreal Championship—demonstrated the service on the show floor. The Epic title was one of the flagship titles for the service, which was slated for a debut on November 15, 2002, marking the anniversary of the Xbox launch. Microsoft announced that 50 Xbox Live titles would be available by the end of 2003. Utilizing the required broadband bandwidth, Xbox Live featured a unified gaming "Friends List", as well as a single identity across all titles (regardless of the publisher), and standardized voice chat with a headset and communication, a feature that was still in its infancy.

Leading up to the launch, Microsoft enlisted several waves of beta testers to improve the service and receive feature feedback. The first wave of beta testers were given Re-Volt (which was never released officially) and NFL Fever 2003 to beta test. Once beta testing concluded, Microsoft sent these beta testers a translucent orange memory card, a headset carrying case, and a beta tester t-shirt with the slogan "I've got great hands". When the service debuted, it lacked much of the functionality that later titles included, but Xbox Live grew and evolved on the Xbox and many aspects of the service were included with the Xbox 360 console out of the box, rather than through a later update. Microsoft granted Live-related patent that gives Xbox 360 users access to watch other gamers compete against each other over Xbox Live.

The packaging for playable Xbox Live titles on the original Xbox console featured a trademark luminescent orange-gold bar underneath the Xbox header. Tom Clancy's Splinter Cell and Brute Force sported a Live "bubble" design, as they only featured downloadable content. It was changed later, wherein all Xbox Live titles included the universal orange-gold Live bar. By the time of the Xbox 360, all titles were required to provide at least a limited form of Xbox Live "awareness". In July 2004, Xbox Live had reached 1 million online users. In July 2005, Xbox Live had reached 2 million online users.

=== Subsequent growth ===
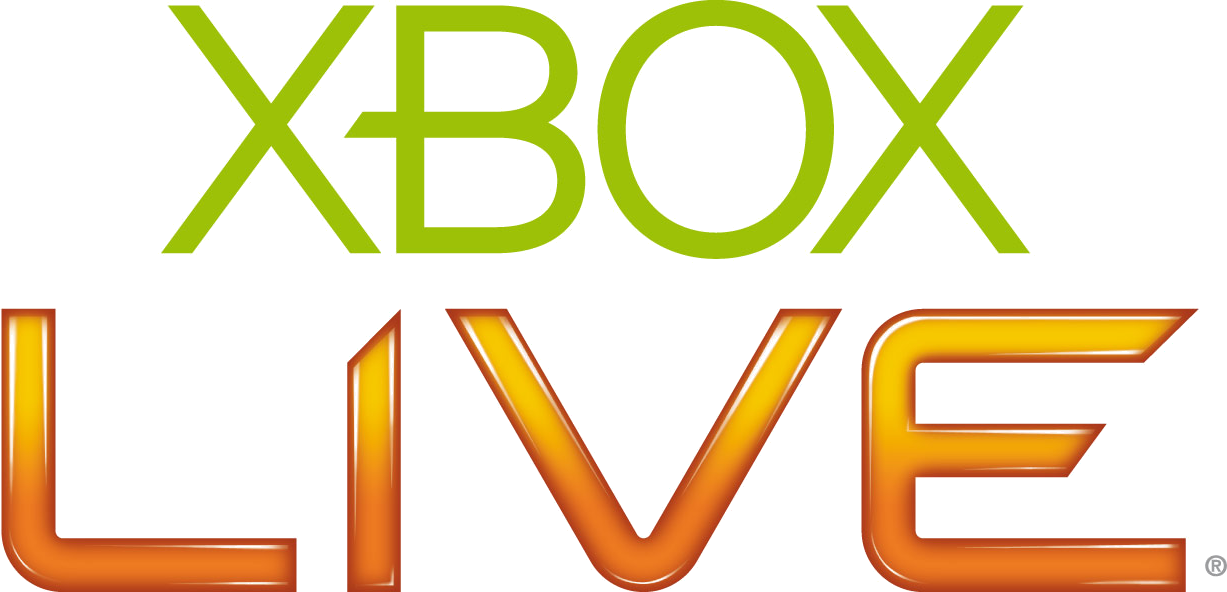
The second Xbox Live logo, used from 2005 until 2013

On November 15, 2007, Microsoft celebrated Xbox Live's 5th anniversary by offering its then over 8 million subscribers the title Carcassonne free of charge and awarding gamers who had subscribed to Live since its inception 500 free Microsoft Points. Due to intermittent service interruptions during late December 2007 and early January 2008, Microsoft promised to offer a free Xbox Live Arcade game to all Xbox Live users as compensation, in an open letter to all Xbox Live members from Marc Whitten, Xbox LIVE General Manager. Increased demand from Xbox 360 purchasers (the largest number of new user sign-ups in the history of Xbox Live) was given as the reason for the downtime. On January 18, 2008, Microsoft announced Undertow would be offered free to both Gold and Free members for the week starting January 23 through January 27 as compensation.

On November 12, 2009, Dennis Durkin, COO of Microsoft's interactive entertainment business, announced that November 10, 2009, the release of Call of Duty: Modern Warfare 2 marked the busiest day ever on Xbox Live, with over two million active users simultaneously.

On February 5, 2010, Marc Whitten announced that Xbox Live had reached 23 million members. On the same day, Larry Hyrb, Xbox Live's Major Nelson, announced on his blog that Xbox Live support for the original Xbox would be discontinued on April 15, 2010, including online play through backwards compatibility on the Xbox 360 and all downloadable content for original Xbox games.

In August 2010, Microsoft announced an increase to the cost of Xbox Live Gold in several countries by 20%, for the first time since its inception. The basic service was also renamed. Before October 2010, the free service was known as Xbox Live Silver.

It was announced on June 10, 2011, that the service is going to be fully integrated into Microsoft's Windows 8.

In October 2011, Microsoft announced live streaming cable television with various providers.

The third Xbox Live logo, used from 2013 until 2021

In February 2013, Yusuf Mehdi, corporate vice president of Microsoft's Interactive Entertainment Business, shared that Xbox Live members now number 46 million, up 15 percent from a year ago, during the Dive into Media conference in Southern California.

In June 2014, Microsoft retracted the Xbox Live Gold requirements to access streaming media apps (including Netflix, Hulu, YouTube, Internet Explorer, Skype, and others), though various rental or subscription fees may still apply.

On December 25, 2014, both PlayStation Network and Xbox Live suffered network disruption after a denial-of-service attack. Functionality was restored on December 28, with some users experiencing difficulties in the days that followed. A group called, "The Phantom Squad" has threatened to disrupt the Xbox Live network through a denial-of-service attack on December 25, 2015.

In 2019, the Official Xbox Magazine revealed that Xbox Live would be made cross platform, and would serve Android, iOS and Nintendo Switch.

Microsoft added Xbox Live Gold to its Xbox Game Pass program as part of a new Xbox Game Pass Ultimate subscription tier in April 2019.

=== Rebranding ===
On January 22, 2021, Microsoft planned to increase the prices for the Xbox Live Gold subscriptions, as follows: by $1 for the monthly subscription ($10.99 from $9.99), by $5 for the 3-month subscription ($29.99 from $24.99), by $20 for the 6-month subscription ($59.99 from $39.99), and by $60 (double the price) for the 12-month subscription ($119.99 from $59.99). However, the 6-month and 12-month subscription price increases would not affect existing subscribers when they resubscribed at the same level, nor those already subscribed through the Xbox Games Pass Ultimate program. However, after complaints from the Xbox community, Microsoft announced on the same day that they revoked their decision, and that they would not increase the prices of any of the subscriptions, thus they would remain the same as they were.

Microsoft officially announced that they would be branding Xbox Live as "Xbox network" in March 2021 to cover all the services related to Xbox and not just Xbox Live. Xbox Live Gold would remain the same name to distinguish the subscription program from the set of services. Microsoft also stated that with this, it would eliminate the requirement to have Xbox Live Gold to play free-to-play games on Xbox consoles.

By January 2021, Microsoft reported that there were more than 100 million Xbox users (including those through the Xbox Game Pass subscription).

On September 14, 2023, Xbox Live Gold was discontinued and replaced by Xbox Game Pass Core, which carries most of the same benefits as Xbox Live Gold, while replacing the "Games with Gold" program with access to a limited rotation of Game Pass titles.

== User information ==
=== Gamertag ===
A gamertag is the universal name for a player's username on the Xbox network. A gamertag is a unique identifier, and can include numbers, letters, and spaces. Gamertags can be changed using an Xbox console (the first time is free; all other changes afterwards are charged), while the Xbox 360 supports eight Xbox network-enabled profiles per memory unit and thirty-two profiles on the hard drive.

A player's Gamertag account status can be checked using a variety of online tools, which is useful especially when looking for a new gamertag, or confirming that a gamertag exists. Using a valid gamertag, any player can be found and messaged from within the network. There are also several websites which allow users of gamertags to upload photos and information about themselves.

Gamertags also contain avatar images (or "gamer pictures"), with the stock images sometimes associated with certain games or game characters. On Xbox 360, individual gamerpics are available, but they are usually bundled into packs. It is also possible to take "Public" pictures (which are shown to all who view a profile, unless the user has a different "personal" picture set) which can be taken of avatars while using the avatar editor. On Xbox One and Xbox Series X|S, players are able to upload custom images of their choice through the Xbox app, subject to Xbox approval.

Users were formerly forbidden to use strings such as "gay" or refer to homosexuality in any way in their gamertag or profile due to it being considered "content of a sexual nature", even if the string occurs in a legitimate surname. Incidents where a woman was suspended from the service for identifying herself as a lesbian, and an incident where a male user was suspended for using his surname "Gaywood" in his username attracted controversy. In February 2009, Xbox Live Lead Program Manager for Enforcement Stephen Toulouse clarified the service's policy on sexual identification, stating that "Expression of any sexual orientation [...] is not allowed in Gamertags" but that the company is "examining how we can provide it in a way that won't get misused". Changes announced in March 2010 permit Xbox Live members to express sexual orientation in their gamertags and profiles.

=== Gamerscore ===
The Gamerscore (G) is an achievements point accumulation system that reflects the number of achievements accumulated by a user on Xbox through the display of the number of points accumulated. These Achievement points are awarded for the completion of game-specific challenges, such as beating a level or amassing a specified number of wins against other players in online matches and other various in-game challenges.

Initially, retail Xbox 360 games offered up to 1,000G spread over a variable number of Achievements, while each Xbox Live Arcade title contained 12 Achievements totaling 200G. On February 1, 2007, Microsoft announced on their Gamerscore Blog some new policies that developers must follow related to Gamerscore and Achievements in future releases. All regular disc-based games must have 1,000 Gamerscore points in the base game; the title can ship with fewer than 1,000 points, but anything added later must be free. Game developers also now have the option of adding up to 250 points via downloadable content every quarter after the first year of release (for a total of 1,750 points). Xbox Live Arcade titles also allowed players to obtain Gamerscore, initially up to 200 Gamerscore with additional points up to 50 Gamerscore via downloadable content (for a total of 250 points), but some XBLA games now contain up to 400 Gamerscore without DLC.

On March 25, 2008, Microsoft cracked down on "Gamerscore cheaters" (those who used external tools to artificially inflate their Gamerscore), and reduced their Gamerscores to zero without the option to recover the scores that had been "earned", and branded the player by denoting on their Gamertag that they were a "Cheater".

The development of the Gamerscore system had created a new niche in the internet economy. Many websites have been created to provide gamers with tips and tricks for getting achievement points. Some sites are solely devoted to these achievement guides, and some blogs provide gaming guides in addition to their other content.

On March 13, 2014, Ray Cox IV or "Stallion83" became the first player in history to reach 1 million Gamerscore.

=== Gamercard ===
The Gamercard is an information panel used to summarize one's user profile on Microsoft's Xbox network. The pieces of information on a Gamercard include:

- Gamertag
- Gamer picture (avatar)
- Reputation (only shown on Xbox One and Xbox Series X|S if the viewed player is constantly violating the Community Standards)
- Tenure (How many years you have been subscribed to Xbox Game Pass Core or Ultimate)
- Gamerscore
- Gamer Zone (Xbox 360 only)
- Recent games played

A player's Gamercard can be viewed via the guide, the Xbox app, or online through Xbox.com.

Similarly, Mac OS X users were able to download widgets that display their Xbox Live Gamercard within Mac OS X's Dashboard. These can be downloaded onto any Mac with OS X 10.4 or higher via Apple's widget download page.

On Xbox 360, there were four Gamer Zones; Recreation is for casual gamers, Family is for family-friendly gamers (without profanity, etc.), Pro is for competitive gamers who enjoy a challenge, and Underground is for no-holds-barred gaming where anything goes (as long as it does not violate the Xbox Live Terms of Use). However, in practice these gamer zones were displayed only on the Gamercard of the player, and did not tend to affect the gameplay experience or the matching of players in online games.

=== TrueSkill ===
TrueSkill is a ranking and matchmaking system which was first implemented as part of the Xbox 360's Live service. Developed at Microsoft Research Cambridge (United Kingdom), the TrueSkill ranking system is now used in over 150 titles for the Xbox 360 and was used in the Games for Windows – Live game Warhammer 40,000: Dawn of War II. It uses a mathematical model of uncertainty to address weaknesses in existing ranking systems such as Elo. For example, a new player joining million-player leagues can be ranked correctly in fewer than 20 games. It can predict the probability of each game outcome, which enhances competitive matchmaking, making it possible to assemble skill-balanced teams from a group of players with different abilities.

When matchmaking, the system attempts to match individuals based on their estimated skill level. If two individuals are competing head-to-head and have the same estimated skill level with low estimate uncertainty, they should each have roughly a 50% chance of winning a match. In this way, the system attempts to make every match as competitive as possible.

In order to prevent abuse of the system, the majority of ranked games have relatively limited options for matchmaking. By design, players cannot easily play with their friends in ranked games. However, these countermeasures have failed due to techniques such as alternate account(s) and system flaws where each system has its own individual TrueSkill rating. To provide less competitive games, the system supports unranked Player Matches, which allow individuals of any skill level to be paired (often including "guests" on an account). Such matches do not contribute to the TrueSkill rating.

== Microsoft Store ==
The Microsoft Store is the current digital marketplace for the Xbox ecosystem starting in 2017 for the Xbox One. It is available on consoles and on Xbox's website (as well as its own website), offering games from across all of Xbox's generations, in addition to movies, television shows, and multiple apps available as streaming services for music or television.

=== Xbox 360 stores ===
Xbox Games Store (formerly Xbox Live Marketplace) was a unified storefront for the Xbox 360 and Xbox One which offered both free and premium content for download including Xbox Live Arcade titles, Xbox indie games, original Xbox games, Xbox 360 game demos, game expansion material (e.g. extra maps, vehicles, songs), trailers, gamer pictures and themes, television shows, music videos, movie rentals, Apps and games and more.

On November 6, 2006, Microsoft announced Microsoft Movies & TV (Microsoft Films & TV in other supported countries) (formerly Xbox Video Marketplace, Xbox Video and Zune Video), an exclusive video store accessible through the Xbox 360. Launched in the United States on November 22, 2006, the first anniversary of the Xbox 360's launch, the service allows users in the United States to download high-definition and standard-definition television shows for purchase and movies for rental onto an Xbox 360 console for viewing. Except for short clips, content is not currently available for streaming and must be downloaded. Movies are available for rental from the Video Marketplace. They expire in 14 days after download or at the end of the first 24 hours after the movie has begun playing, whichever comes first. Television episodes can be purchased to own, and are transferable to an unlimited number of consoles. Downloaded files use 5.1 surround audio and are encoded using VC-1 for video at 720p, with a bitrate of 6.8 Mbit/s. Television content is offered from MTV, VH1, Comedy Central, Turner Broadcasting and CBS; and movie content is Warner Bros., Paramount and Disney, along with other publishers.

== Xbox Play Anywhere ==
Xbox Play Anywhere logo

Originally called Live Anywhere, Play Anywhere is a cross-platform service allowing owners of Xbox and Windows games the ability to use said games on either operating system. Under the scheme, supported games purchased digitally on Microsoft Store for Xbox One can also be downloaded on a Windows 10 PC (running Windows 10 Anniversary Update or later) through Microsoft Store using the same Microsoft account at no additional charge, and vice versa. The scheme also promotes the ability to synchronize save data, achievements, and downloadable content between Windows 10 and Xbox One versions of a game.

Microsoft announced in March 2019 that it would be providing Xbox Live SDKs for iOS and Android mobile devices, allowing developers on those platforms to integrate most services of the Xbox network into their applications and games. Microsoft also stated that they were looking to bring this functionality to the Nintendo Switch, anticipating this to be a post-launch feature for the Switch port of Cuphead.

=== History ===
Play Anywhere was originally released as Live Anywhere as a cross-platform initiative to bring the Xbox network to a wide variety of Microsoft platforms and devices, including Xbox, Xbox 360, Microsoft Windows (Vista and 7), Windows Phone, and Zune. Microsoft's Chris Early said of Live Anywhere in 2006 that "it [was] a long-term project expected to be rolled out over several years". While a concept service for mobile devices was demonstrated at E3 2006 and CES 2006 on a Motorola Q mobile phone, it never released.

On February 15, 2010, Microsoft announced its new mobile operating system, Windows Phone. With Windows Phone 7 and Windows Mobile 10, Microsoft integrated full Xbox Live functionality. Windows Phone has since been discontinued.

At E3 2016 on June 14, 2016, Play Anywhere was announced, rebranding Live Anywhere, and releasing on September 13, 2016.

== Xbox Game Pass ==
Signing up for the Xbox network is free, but a recurring subscription to Xbox Game Pass is required to access community features such as online multiplayer for paid games, game recording, and media sharing. The service includes access to a library of games which can be downloaded and played at no additional charge; they become locked and unplayable if the subscription lapses, or the title is no longer available to Game Pass. While initially requiring a subscription, online multiplayer on free-to-play titles, as well as the party chat feature on Xbox consoles, no longer need a subscription to use as of April 2021.

The service is available in multiple tiers:

- Game Pass Essential launched on September 14, 2023 with the name Game Pass Core. It subsumed and replaced the former Xbox Live Gold service with a basic version of the Xbox Game Pass service that originally launched in 2017. Game Pass Core was functionally identical to Xbox Live Gold, except that the former "Games with Gold" program (which offered a free game per-month to subscribers) was replaced with access to a rotation of Game Pass titles available on Xbox consoles. This feature launched with 36 games, with plans to occasionally add more. On October 1st, 2025, the plan was renamed alongside Game Pass Standard with large updates to the service. The plan keeps the functionality of Game Pass Core while also affecting gaming on Windows PCs.
- Game Pass Premium (previously known as Game Pass Standard) offers the full Game Pass library on Xbox consoles, but does not include "day-one" access to first-party Microsoft Gaming releases; it launched in 2025 to replace a previous iteration of the base Game Pass service which did not include access to Xbox Live Gold features. On October 1st, 2025, the plan was renamed alongside Game Pass Core with large updates to the service. The plan keeps the functionality of Game Pass Standard while also affecting gaming on Windows PCs.
- Game Pass Ultimate offers the full Game Pass library on Xbox consoles, Microsoft Windows PCs, and Xbox Cloud Gaming.

== Programs ==
=== Former ===
The "Game with Fame" initiative was Microsoft's way to connect Xbox Live members with celebrities and game developers. Notable participants of "Game with Fame" include Shia LaBeouf, Jack Black, Rihanna, Velvet Revolver, Victoria Justice, Shaun Wright-Phillips, Scissor Sisters, Paramore, Korn, OK Go, Red Jumpsuit Apparatus, Dream Theater, Linkin Park, Green Day and Insane Clown Posse.

"Xbox Rewards" was a promotion designed to provide gamers with incentives to play on the Xbox network by subsidizing achievement points earned with actual rewards. Gamers were required to register for specific challenges which, if successfully completed, would yield a challenge-specific reward.

"Xbox Live Labs" was a program found in the community section and was available from March 10 to 27, 2011 for members in the United States. If a player chose to participate, they were rewarded with avatar items and 3 zero-point achievements.

Metamessage was a show which aimed to answer questions sent in by viewers on anything related to the world of Xbox. The show ran for four series and was released every other Saturday. The show was driven entirely by user-generated questions. To ensure the volume of questions remained high, fans could contact the show in a variety of ways, including sending questions to the Metamessage Gamertag over Xbox LIVE, writing an email, or using social network websites.

"Games with Gold" was a program in which digital downloads of games were offered at no charge to Xbox Live Gold subscribers. Games with Gold initially launched with the Xbox 360 in July 2013, while Xbox One games were added in June 2014. After October 2022, Games with Gold no longer offered Xbox 360 games, with future releases being Xbox One games only. Games downloaded through the program on Xbox 360 were free to own with no further restrictions. Xbox One Games with Gold titles required an active Gold subscription to use, and became locked and unplayable if the subscription lapsed. As of November 2015, all Games with Gold titles for Xbox 360 were backwards compatible on Xbox One. The service was discontinued on September 14, 2023 as part of the Xbox network rebranding and focusing on a base-level Game Pass tier.

=== Current ===
Microsoft Rewards is a current promotion providing Xbox network members with Reward Points (not to be confused with the defunct Microsoft Points) when they achieve Game Pass goals, buy something on the Marketplace, etc.

"Xbox Ambassadors" are Xbox network members selected by Microsoft who have proven themselves to be helpful towards others, and are willing to assist new Xbox users and answer their questions. As of March 2009, there are ambassadors representing 18 countries in more than 30 languages.

== Security ==
Microsoft implements a number of different security measures on its Xbox network service. One of these takes the form of a proactive security check that assures that only unmodified machines may access their service. On May 17, 2007, Microsoft banned consoles with modified firmware from Xbox Live. A Microsoft representative indicated that the action was taken to assure "the integrity of the service and protect our partners and users." According to Microsoft, consoles with firmware of unknown origin, quality or intent were banned permanently from the Xbox network.

It has been discovered that pretexting has been used to impersonate an Xbox network user for sabotage. Microsoft subsequently implemented greater security to decrease the service's susceptibility to social engineering.

In early November 2009 Microsoft banned approximately 1 million consoles with modified firmware from Xbox Live.

In October 2011, users of Xbox Live reported having unauthorized access to their Xbox Live accounts, with Microsoft points subsequently being used and/or bought to purchase various in-game items for FIFA 12. Microsoft responded to such incidents by restricting access to the account for 25 days while the fraud team investigated. Both EA and Microsoft denied the existence of a wider security breach.

On December 25, 2014, both PlayStation Network and Xbox Live suffered network disruption after a denial-of-service attack. Functionality was restored on December 28, with some users experiencing difficulties in the days that followed.

== First-generation Xbox Live shutdown ==
Xbox Live for the original Xbox was discontinued by Microsoft on April 15, 2010, encouraging gamers to upgrade to the Xbox 360. Through loopholes and flaws, however, users were still able to play after the provided time and date Microsoft announced the shutdown. Users could continue interacting in the network; new users, however, could not enter the system. Notably, 14 users played Halo 2 until May 11, 2010. Though the official Xbox Live service has been discontinued for the original Xbox, a replacement service for the original Xbox called Insignia has returned online functionality including online multiplayer, scoreboards, content download and more features to currently supported games.

As an alternative to Insignia, LAN tunnelling software exists, allowing original Xbox users to play system link games such as Halo 2 with other people from around the world.

=== The "Noble 14" ===
The Noble 14 were a band of users who continued to play Halo 2 until May 11, 2010, 26 days after the service was officially discontinued by Microsoft. The users would play custom games together, with all attempting to stay on for as long as possible. An Xbox spokesperson made a statement regarding the Noble 14, "A small band of a committed few, engaged in a battle against insurmountable odds. It's not Noble team from Halo: Reach, it's the final, passionate few who are still playing Halo 2. We wish them the best in their battle against time." The last 12 users were offered Halo: Reach Beta Codes by GamesRadar.com, as well as having their Xbox Live memberships extended by Microsoft. Eventually "Agent Windex" and "Apache N4SIR" were the final two users on the service, however two days after the third user "Lord Odysseus11" was disconnected by an internet drop, user Agent Windex was booted on May 10, stating "Good job Apache, you're the last one." The next day, May 11, Apache N4SIR was booted offline after many hours since Agent Windex was disconnected. He stated that he wanted to play 15 hours, 14 for each member, then one final hour for the community.

== Revenue ==
Bloomberg has estimated that Xbox network likely generated over $1 billion in revenue in the 2010 fiscal year, which ended on June 30, 2010.

== See also ==
- Nintendo Network
- Nintendo Switch Online
- PlayStation Network
- Windows Live
