= POD 2 =

2000 video game

- Developers: Ubi Soft Bucharest
- Publisher: Ubi Soft
- Platform: Dreamcast
- Release: NA: December 6, 2000; EU: December 14, 2000
- Genre: Racing
- Modes: Single player, multiplayer

POD 2: Multiplayer Online (released under the title POD: Speedzone in North America) is the sequel to the 1997 racing game POD, made by Ubisoft and available for Dreamcast in 2000.

== Gameplay ==
In POD 2 the player had the option of connecting to the Internet to play against other people. The game takes place on a terraformed version of Saturn's largest moon Titan where a planet-wide viral outbreak has taken place. The premise of the game is that the only person who knows how to contain the virus will only assist the player if they race against him. There are a variety of courses that include volcanoes and deserts.

== Development and release ==
A PlayStation 2 and a Microsoft Windows version were also planned for release in 2001, both developed by Ubisoft UK, but were scrapped.

In October 2017 the online portions of the game were brought back online thanks to fans.

== Reception ==
Reception

Aggregate score
Aggregator	Score
Metacritic	69/100

Review scores
Publication	Score
AllGame	2.5/5
Electronic Gaming Monthly	4.33/10 (Note: Three critics of Electronic Gaming Monthly gave the game each a score of 5.5/10, 3/10, and 4.5/10.)
EP Daily	6/10
Game Informer	3.5/10
Gamekult	3/10
GameSpot	6.1/10
GameZone	6/10
IGN	6.6/10
Jeuxvideo.com	13/20
Next Generation	2/5

The game received "average" reviews according to the review aggregation website Metacritic. Blake Fisher of NextGen said that the game was "As mediocre a racing experience as you can possibly buy." Lamchop of GamePro said, "If you're looking for some racing combat fun, this pod is for you." (Note: GamePro gave the game 4.5/5 for graphics, 3/5 for sound, and two 4/5 scores for control and fun factor.)
