= Alien Front Online =

2001 video game

- Developer: Wow Entertainment
- Publisher: Sega
- Producers: Makoto Uchida; Kevin Klemmick; Gerardo Sprigg
- Designer: Makoto Uchida
- Composers: Howard Drossin; Makito Nomiya
- Platforms: Arcade, Dreamcast
- Release: Arcade: NA: January 2001; JP: September 2001; Dreamcast: NA: August 7, 2001
- Genre: Vehicular combat
- Modes: Single-player, multiplayer
- Arcade system: Sega NAOMI

Alien Front Online is a 2001 video game released for the Dreamcast. It is an online version of the arcade game Alien Front, where it was bundled with the Microphone accessory. It was only released in North America.

The game was brought back online by fans through private servers in 2016.

== Gameplay ==
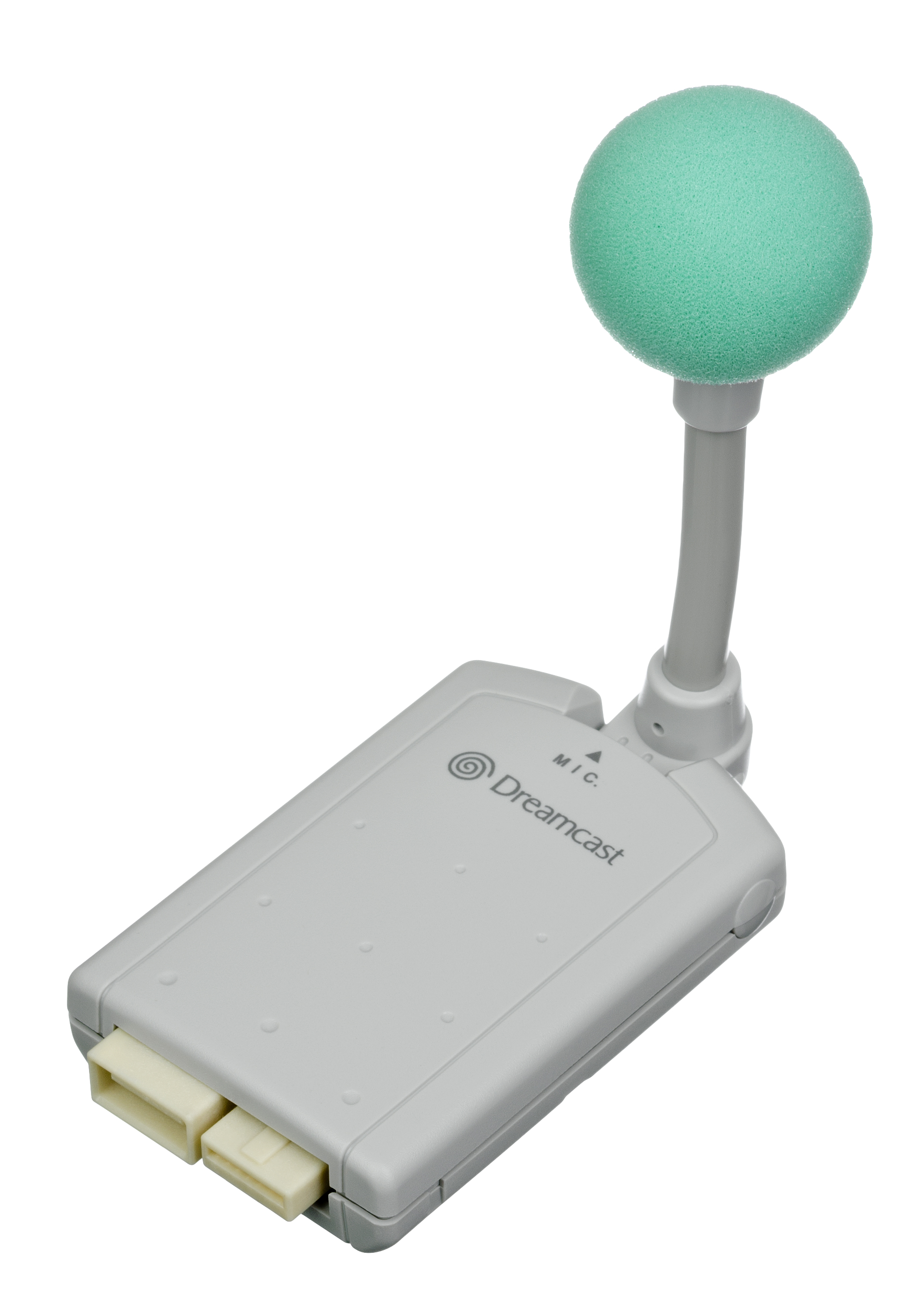
The Microphone accessory, which is compatible with the game

In the game, players use armored vehicles to fight battles staged in arenas. Players can choose which side to fight for; the Triclops or the military. Players can also choose one of three different vehicles, each having its own advantages and disadvantages. Although the game is fully playable for one person, it was primarily designed as an online game in which up to 8 players (up to 4 on each side) can play. Players move around the arena attempting to shoot each other, while also looking for power-ups for their vehicles. The game is played for a set number of minutes, after which the team with the most kills are declared the winners.

== Development ==
Art director Gerardo Sprigg was working at Acclaim's struggling coin-op division on Magic: The Gathering: Armageddon, and before the studio closed, Sega employees paid a visit looking to buy arcade projects or people to recruit. Several months passed, when Sprigg received an email from Makoto Uchida, who had a small Japanese development team that were living in the US and working at Sega of America. Uchida's boss had mandated him to find some Americans to work with, with the idea to make their titles feel more American. Sprigg and Uchida met, where it was decided that the old Acclaim art team would reunite and join Wow Entertainment in the US to work on a new project that would appeal to American audiences. Uchida was a big fan of Tokyo Wars which was popular in arcades, and wanted to create a vehicle game as he noticed that people enjoyed cabinets with steering wheels and pedals. In contrast to Tokyo Wars, Uchida was adamant on including destructible environments. During development, someone had suggested a premise of the US military fighting off an alien invasion, which the Americans liked but the Japanese were somewhat sceptical. Once a functional demo was running, testing for the Alien Front arcade game began in several California locations, and the game was brought to E3 2000, where it appeared to be fairly popular, despite being in the back corner of the Sega booth. Following the success of the cabinet, a home port was planned. New levels were added to the Dreamcast version, and online connectivity between the arcade and Dreamcast versions was even considered, but because the arcade never released outside Japan, the feature was scrapped.

== Release ==
Alien Front was released exclusively in Japanese arcades on January 23, 2001, and Alien Front Online was released on the Dreamcast exclusively in North America August 7, 2001. It was originally slated for release in Japan, but was cancelled. Copies of Alien Front Online were packaged with the Microphone accessory due to poor sales of Seaman. A related game, simply titled Alien Front, was announced by Sega for the N-Gage in 2004, but was eventually cancelled. A prototype ROM image of the N-Gage version was leaked online in 2019.

== Reception ==
Reception

Aggregate score
Aggregator	Score
Metacritic	76/100

Review scores
Publication	Score
Electronic Gaming Monthly	6.5/10
Game Informer	8/10
GamePro	3.5/5
GameRevolution	B−
GameSpot	7.6/10
GameSpy	7.5/10
IGN	8.5/10
Next Generation	3/5
X-Play	4/5

The game received "generally favorable reviews" according to the review aggregation website Metacritic. Rob Smolka of Next Generation said that the game was "not terribly original, but the basics are solid enough to make it fun, especially when you can taunt your foes and coordinate your attack with teammates online".
