= Ghost Blade =

2015 video game

- Developer: HUCAST Games (Note: HD version developed by 2Dream.)
- Publisher: HUCAST Games (Note: HD version published by 2Dream and Eastasiasoft, Dreamcast re-release by JoshProd.)
- Producer: Tulio Gonçalves
- Designer: René Hellwig
- Programmer: Daniel Lancha
- Artist: René Hellwig
- Composer: Rafael Dyll
- Platforms: Dreamcast, PlayStation 4, Wii U, Xbox One, PC, Nintendo Switch
- Release: 2015: Dreamcast; WW: September 16, 2015 PlayStation 4; NA/EU: February 28, 2017; AS: July 14, 2017; JP: September 1, 2017; HK: March 1, 2018 Wii U; NA/EU: February 28, 2017 Xbox One; WW: February 28, 2017 PC; WW: March 8, 2017 Switch; NA/EU: October 24, 2019
- Genre: Vertically scrolling shooter
- Modes: Single-player, multiplayer

Ghost Blade is a 2015 vertically scrolling shooter video game developed and originally published by German studio HUCAST Games as an independent commercial release for the Dreamcast. It was re-released between 2017 and 2018 by JoshProd. A high-definition version titled Ghost Blade HD was also released for PlayStation 4, Wii U, Xbox One, PC, and Nintendo Switch. Controlling one of three fighter crafts, the player fights to protect Mars against the corrupt artificial intelligence Shira. Its gameplay consist of five stages, with players gathering collectible items and defeating enemies to build combos and maintain a high-score, while avoiding collision with their projectiles and obstacles.

Ghost Blade was created in conjunction with Neo XYX (2013) and Redux: Dark Matters (2014) by a separate team at HUCAST that branched off to work on the project. It was produced by Tulio Gonçalves, one of the creators of Pier Solar and the Great Architects (2010), with NG:Dev.Team co-founder and HUCAST founder René Hellwig serving as game designer. The soundtrack was composed by Rafael Dyll, who had collaborated on other NG:Dev.Team projects. The game is heavily inspired by the Star Soldier series, while its art design was inspired by Halo 4 (2012). The original Dreamcast release was met with average reception from critics, while the PS4 and Xbox One version garnered mixed or average reviews.

== Gameplay ==
Gameplay screenshot

Ghost Blade is a vertical-scrolling shooter video game. The plot revolves around an ancient artificial intelligence known as Shira, which became corrupt and started terrorizing the residents of Mars. The Earth Defense Force is called upon for help, sending one of their pilots to fight against Shira. Gameplay is compared to shooters by Cave such as Mushihimesama (2004). There are two modes of play: arcade and training. Controlling one of three fighter crafts, the player fights through five stages over a constantly scrolling background and the scenery never stops moving until a boss is reached, which must be defeated in order to progress further.

Players have only two weapons at their disposal: the main gun that travels a max distance of the screen's height that can be held down to concentrate fire but reduces the ship's movement, and bombs capable of obliterating any enemy caught within its blast radius. By destroying enemies with concentrated fire, enemies drop grey orbs when defeated, which grants an extra bomb stock when a gauge is filled. There are multiple scoring methods for reaching high-scores: points can be gained from collecting gold medals scattered. Destroying an enemy or part of an enemy increases the combo by 1 and builds up a combo gauge that constantly drains, and the combo is broken when it empties. Getting hit will result in losing a life, and the game is over once all lives are lost. The HD version, titled Ghost Blade HD, introduces a timed score attack mode akin to shooters by Hudson Soft, where the player is tasked with scoring as many points before the time runs out.

== Development ==
Ghost Blade was created by independent German studio HUCAST Games, which had previously made DUX (2009) and its remake Redux: Dark Matters (2014) for Dreamcast. The game was developed in conjunction with Neo XYX (2013) and Redux by a separate team at HUCAST that branched off to work on the project. It was produced by Tulio Gonçalves, one of the creators of Pier Solar and the Great Architects (2010). René Hellwig, co-founder of NG:Dev.Team and founder of HUCAST, served as the game's designer and graphist. Daniel Lancha, who had also worked on Pier Solar and other titles, acted as the game's sole programmer. The soundtrack was composed by Rafael Dyll, who had collaborated on other NG:Dev.Team projects. Other staff members also collaborated in the game's creation. The staff recounted the project's development cycle in interviews.

Hellwig revealed that he set up a prompt at the "SHMUPS!" forum in early 2015 when the original programmer became occupied with other issues, being approached by Lancha due to his past works. Hellwig claimed that the game was heavily inspired by the Star Soldier series, while the art design was inspired by Halo 4 (2012). Hellwig also cited Ghost in the Shell as inspiration for his work. The in-game and title cover artworks were handled by pseudonymous artists "Genzoman" and "Henzo" respectively. Dyll described the game's sound design as Japanese with European elements. Development of the Dreamcast version finished in September and production of a high-definition version began afterwards. Titled Ghost Blade HD, this version was developed 2Dream, a studio founded by Gonçalves.

== Release ==
Ghost Blade was first unveiled by HUCAST Games in 2013 and initially listed for a summer 2013 launch. Pre-orders officially opened in 2014, listing the game with a vague 2015 date. HUCAST later announced the game would launch on September 17, while also launching a gameplay teaser trailer later that year. The Dreamcast version was published on September 16, in a Japanese-style DVD packaging as three editions; a regular edition, a deluxe edition limited to 1000 copies containing a soundtrack enclosed with the game, as well as a collector edition limited to 500 units featuring an alternate cover art, a superplay DVD, and other additional extras.

In 2017, a high-definition version titled Ghost Blade HD was released by 2Dream in North America and Europe on February 28 for PlayStation 4, Wii U, and Xbox One. This version features remastered visuals, technical fixes, increased difficulty, new enemies, and caravan mode. The PS4 version was also released in Asia on July 14, then in Japan by Eastasiasoft on September 1, and later in Hong Kong on March 1, 2018. On March 8, 2017, a PC version was also released via Steam. Between 2017 and 2018, the Dreamcast version was re-released by JoshProd. On October 24, 2019, the HD version was released for Nintendo Switch as well by Eastasiasoft in physical and digital formats. In a 2020 interview, Gonçalves revealed that 2Dream also considered a PlayStation Vita release of the HD version.

== Reception ==
Reception

Aggregate score
Aggregator	Score			
Aggregator	Dreamcast	PS4	Wii U	Xbox One
Metacritic	N/A	62/100	N/A	72/100

Review scores
Publication	Score			
Publication	Dreamcast	PS4	Wii U	Xbox One
Destructoid	N/A	6/10	N/A	N/A
Hardcore Gamer	3/5	2.5/5	N/A	N/A
M! Games	N/A	70/100	N/A	N/A
Nintendo Life	N/A	N/A	7/10	N/A
Push Square	N/A	8/10	N/A	N/A
Retro Gamer	5/10	N/A	N/A	N/A
VentureBeat	70/100	N/A	N/A	N/A
Cubed3	7/10	7/10	N/A	N/A
Digitally Downloaded	N/A	3/5 stars	N/A	N/A
The Guardian	N/A	5/5 stars	5/5 stars	5/5 stars
Metro	7/10	N/A	N/A	N/A
Oprainfall	N/A	N/A	3.5/5 stars	N/A
TrueAchievements	N/A	N/A	N/A	7/10

Ghost Blade on Dreamcast garnered average reception from critics. Hardcore Gaming 101's Kurt Kalata felt that it was a good entry point for players inexperienced with titles such as Mushihimesama (2004), citing its straightforward scoring system, but remarked that it lacked in originality and refinement. Kalata found the overall visual design to be cool but "muddy", and Rafael Dyll's electronica-style music standard fare, but criticized its technical issues and noted the lack of caravan mode. Hardcore Gamer's Bradly Halestorm concurred with Kalata, finding the game's graphical presentation middling and inconsistent, and the audio fidelity unimpressive. Halestorm also criticized several aspects such as its short length, lack of extra modes, difficulty to distinguish enemy bullets on-screen, and inconsistent frame rate. Despite finding its gameplay easier compared to Bullet Soul (2011), he nevertheless regarded it to be an enjoyable and accessible vertical-scrolling shooer.

Metro's Roger Hargreaves commended the level design, impressive visuals for Dreamcast standards, and soundtrack, but saw its simplistic gameplay, short length, and occasional slowdown as negative points. In contrast to the other reviewers, VentureBeat's Stephen Kleckner gave positive remarks to the game's straightforward design, pacing, audiovisual presentation, but noted its lack of additional modes and higher difficulty levels. Cubed3's Az Elias shared similar thoughts as Kleckner, commending its "lush" backgrounds, colorful enemy sprites, music, and balanced stage designs, but faulted its short length and underwhelming bosses. Retro Gamer's Nick Thorpe wrote that "Ghost Blade isn't awful by any means, but between performance problems, a lack of replay value and a dearth of originality, it will fail to hold the attention of all but the least demanding players."

Ghost Blade HD on PlayStation 4 and Xbox One version garnered "mixed or average" reviews, according to review aggregator site Metacritic. Gabriel Jones of Cubed3 felt that the HD version compared favorably to the Dreamcast original, highlighting the lack of slowdown as well as the additions of score attack mode and online leaderboards. Jones also commended its gameplay loop and balanced difficulty. Push Square's Brandon Marlow agreed with Jones, praising the difficulty progression, gameplay, and score attack mode, labelling it as a "brilliant entry into the shoot-'em-up genre for both newcomers and veterans alike." However, Marlow felt let down with its multiplayer mode. TrueAchievements' Sam Quirke praised its retro-style presentation and replay value, but found the game occasionally overwhelming visual-wise and criticized its short length.

Destructoid's Chris Carter wrote that "Ghost Blade HD has the makings of a classic shoot-'em-up, but ends up coming off like a half-measure." However, Carter singled out the soundtrack as its standout feature. Jason Bohn of Hardcore Gamer wrote that the game was devoid of personality, comparing its enemy designs unfavorably with Deathsmiles (2007) and finding its electronic music to be generic. Reviewing the Wii U release, Nintendo Life's Lee Meyer labelled it as a good bullet hell shooter, lauding its training mode as a solid addition for newcomers. Meyer also commended HUCAST Games and 2Dream Corporation for the amount of polish and professionalism in the game, as well as the anime aesthetic. MAN!AC's Sascha Göddenhoff regarded it as "a decent shoot'em up that doesn't bring anything new to the genre." Oprainfall's Justin Guillou also reviewed the Wii U release, highlighting its low difficulty, techno music, score attack mode, and replay value, but expressed disappointment with the limited artwork. Digitally Downloaded's Clark A. thought of it as an entertaining game.
