= Homebrew (video games) =

Hobbyist-developed games for closed systems

Homebrew, when used in the context of video games, refers to unofficial software produced by hobbyists for proprietary video game consoles, which are not intended to be user-programmable. The official documentation for many video game consoles is often only available to licensed developers, and these systems may use storage formats that make distribution difficult, such as ROM cartridges or encrypted CD-ROMs. Many consoles also have hardware restrictions to prevent unauthorized development.

Targets for homebrew games are typically those which are no longer commercially relevant or produced and with simpler graphics and/or computational abilities. These include consoles and handhelds such as the Atari 2600, Nintendo Entertainment System, Game Boy, Genesis, Super Nintendo Entertainment System, PlayStation, Nintendo 64, Dreamcast, PlayStation 2, Xbox, Game Boy Advance, Nintendo DS, Xbox 360, Wii, PlayStation 3, Nintendo 3DS, PlayStation Vita, and Wii U, however more recent consoles like the PlayStation 4 and Nintendo Switch have also received support for homebrew. Development can use unofficial, community maintained toolchains or official development kits such as Net Yaroze, Linux for PlayStation 2, or Microsoft XNA.

There are several groups within the hacking and homebrew community that are focused on circumventing the hardware and software restrictions imposed on them to allow for the use of homebrew, as well as creating software for consoles that are opened up for homebrew such as emulators.

== Development ==
New games for older systems are typically developed using emulators. Development for newer systems usually involves actual hardware, given the lack of accurate emulators. However, efforts have been made to use actual console hardware for many older systems. Atari 2600 programmers may burn an EEPROM to plug into a custom cartridge board or use audio transfer via the Starpath Supercharger. Game Boy Advance developers have several ways to use GBA flash cartridges in this regard.

== First generation consoles ==
=== Odyssey ===
In 2009, Odball became the first game for the Magnavox Odyssey since 1973. It was produced by Robert Vinciguerra who has since written several other Odyssey games. On July 11, 2011, Dodgeball was published by Chris Read.

Since the Odyssey is built from discrete electronics to generate square shapes with only rudimentary collision detection, the console depends on physical "game cards" acting as jumpers to manipulate its functionality depending on the style of the game, and plastic overlays for use on a television as well as accessories and game pieces — akin to a tabletop board game — to make up for the lack of active circuitry to facilitate gameplay. As such, "developing" games for the platform rely more on defining gameplay rules and producing physical accessories than any actual "programming" unlike later video game consoles.

== Second generation consoles ==
=== Channel F ===
A handful of games have been programmed for the Fairchild Channel F, the first console to use ROM cartridges. The first known release is Sean Riddle's clone of Lights Out which included instructions on how to modify the SABA#20 Chess game into a Multi-Cartridge. There is also a version of Tetris and in 2008 "Videocart 27: Pac-Man" became the first full production game for the system since it was discontinued.

== Third/fourth generation consoles ==
=== NES / Famicom ===
Several compilers are available for the Nintendo Entertainment System, but like the Atari 2600, most development is done in 6502 assembly language. One impediment to NES homebrew development is the relative difficulty involved with producing physical cartridges, although third-party flash carts do exist, making homebrew possible on original NES hardware.

In April 2023 NESFab, a new programming language for the NES, was released. The programming language is based upon C# and C++ making the development of software for the system relatively fast and efficient. Its release consequently witnessed the increment of homebrew games for the NES, amongst them being Mosh-Lift by Morphcat Games and Ballooney by Nikusoft.

Several varieties of custom processors are used within NES cartridges to expand system capabilities; most are difficult to replicate except by scavenging old cartridges unless the mapper in question was commonly used and thus cloned a lot, as is the case with the MMC3, or is simply consisted of discrete logic. One of the unofficial games that uses the MMC5 chip is Street Fighter II: Nostalgic Edition (titled Street Fighter II NE), an unofficial port of Street Fighter II: The World Warrior to the NES by Parisoft.

While the original Famicom and its clones can play unlicensed games, the Checking Integrated Circuit (CIC) hardware lock-out mechanism of the original model NES historically complicated the production of physical cartridges by unlicensed publishers who previously resorted to workarounds such as negative voltage spikes or passthrough dongles built into unlicensed cartridges where an officially licensed retail cartridge is used to pass authentication checks; Atari Games subsidiary Tengen on the other hand produced a hardware clone of the CIC called the "Rabbit" chip, based on a description of the code in the lockout chip from the United States Copyright Office by claiming that it was required to defend against present infringement claims in a legal case. Tengen then used these documents to design their Rabbit chip, which duplicated the function of the 10NES. In response, Nintendo sued Atari for copyright infringement. Later advancements by homebrew and aftermarket game developers resulted in third-party and open hardware clones of the CIC such as the Ciclone and multi-region CICs on AVR microcontrollers.

Although it took years for the CIC and its protocol to be completely reverse-engineered and made publicly available, it can be easily bypassed by cutting or lifting a pin on the CIC chip, the instructions of which were included in some unlicensed games such as Wally Bear and the NO! Gang. However, some games such as Firehawk and Quattro Adventure by Codemasters will not work on a modified NES with the CIC disabled. The redesigned NES (model NES-101, also known as the New-Style NES or the New Famicom) lack the CIC chip.

=== Genesis / Mega Drive ===
The Sega Genesis has no physical lockout mechanism (instead relying on software encoding), making it easier to release software for the system. Various flash cartridges are available, including the Everdrive and Mega Everdrive line of flash cartridges produced by Ukrainian developer krikzz (the former being the first product in the Everdrive series of flash cartridges), the Mega SD by TerraOnion, and others.

Pier Solar and the Great Architects, Paprium, and a port of Teenage Queen are examples of games that were released as physical cartridges. Other games include Sacred Line Genesis, Coffee Crisis, and Frog Feast for the Genesis and Mighty Mighty Missile for the Sega CD.

The 2018 game Tanglewood was notable in that it was developed using original Sega Genesis development hardware.

=== TurboGrafx-16 / PC Engine ===
The TurboGrafx-16/PC Engine has a comparatively small homebrew scene. The first homebrew title was MindRec's Implode in 2002, a few years after the system's last official release (Dead of the Brain I & II for the PC Engine in 1999). The title was released on CD-ROM. Two years later, MindRec released Meteor Blaster DX on CD-R. Their official word on the change of CD format was that they were unable to be pressed to CD-ROM proper due to the glass mastering software suddenly unable to handle the unorthodox style of CD structure that the system expects. Five years later, Aetherbyte Studios released Insanity, a Berzerk clone, on pressed CD-ROMs, quelling the notion of unpressable CDs. Aetherbyte later went on to prototype and produce a new HuCard design called "AbCARD", which was fully compatible with the console. Aetherbyte celebrated the 30th Anniversary of the PC Engine since its release in 1987.

There is one C compiler for the console known as HuC, however it has not been officially updated since 2005. The MagicKit assembler is generally considered the de facto assembler for the console, and comes included with HuC. Additional libraries for HuC/MagicKit include Squirrel, a sound engine developed by Aetherbyte Studios, and the SGX/ACD library, developed by Tomatheous, that gives the developer easy access to the SuperGrafx video hardware as well as the Arcade Card.

The cc65 C compiler is compatible with the console, although there is no development library supported for it.

There are a few original TurboGrafx CD games being made such as FX Unit Yuki: The Henshin Engine and a port of Mysterious Song in 2012. In 2025, Special Ninja Squad's demo was released for the system, coming out on HuCard format.

=== SNES / Super Famicom ===
Bung Enterprises released the Game Doctor SF hardware series. It allows users to copy games and run new games on SNES hardware. ROMs can be converted into the Game Doctor SF format and put onto a 3 1/2" floppy. Games as large as twelve megabits can be put on floppy disks formatted to 1.6 megabytes. An alternative device is the Super Flash, by Tototek, which allows multiple games to be burned onto a flash memory chip in a cartridge. This allows games as large as 48 megabits. The system can also program compatibility with a C compiler. The language program interest growth from French fans, porting Konami's Asterix beat 'em up.

The run and gun game Alisha's Adventure used original Super Famicom development hardware. WaterMelon's action role-playing game codenamed ProjectN is a brand-new homebrew game for the SNES that is currently in development. Dottie -dreads nought- has been released for the 2021 SNESdev Game Jam, among Supercooked in 2022.

=== Neo-Geo MVS, AES, and CD ===
The Neo-Geo Home Cart and Arcade Systems can be tough candidates for homebrew development. Neo-Geo AES (Advanced Entertainment System) and MVS (Multi-Video System) cartridges have two separate boards: one for video, and one for sound. If programming a cartridge for the system were to occur, it would involve replacing the old ROM chips with one's newly programmed ones as the cartridges are in a sense, Arcade boards. NGDevTeam, who have released Fast Striker and Gunlord, simply printed out their own board and soldered their own ROM chips onto it; this, however, can cause the Universe Bios logo to look corrupted if a custom BIOS were to be programmed. Programming for the Neo-Geo CD, however, is easier than programming for cartridges. The CDs themselves can actually contain both sound and video respectively. Depending on the Megabit count for a game program, load times will vary. A CD game with low Megabit counts will load only one time, whereas a CD game with higher megabit counts could load in between scenes, or rounds. As of 2014, other full games have been scheduled for release in physical form, such as Neo Xyx.

Razoola, programmer of the Neo-Geo Universe Bios, was working on January 23rd, 2019 on a "Skeleton Game Driver" that supports two players. This ROM is meant to remedy the corrupted Universe Bios Screens, as well as work with an unmodified/stock Neo-Geo MVS or AES.

Razion is an example of an original Neo Geo game ported over to modern consoles, in this case the Nintendo Switch.

=== Game Boy ===
There are many toolkits and utilities available to program homebrew on the Game Boy. ROM hacks of games on the handheld are available for the system, as well as new games such as Tobu Tobu Girl. There are also unofficial ports and demakes of games from other home consoles and handhelds made for the Game Boy, some examples are a demake of the PlayStation game Castlevania: Symphony of the Night, a port of the infamous Philips CD-i game Zelda's Adventure, and a port of Stunt Race FX.

=== Lynx ===
Very soon after the release of the Lynx was the first homebrew devkit release which was later named BLL (as it was done by the same developers as BJL for the Atari Jaguar). At the beginning, game development on BLL used 65C02 assembly much like on the Atari ST, but soon cc65 support was added. In the recent years, the homebrew scene developed a number of new games.

== Fifth generation consoles ==
=== PC-FX ===
There is only one Homebrew development kit known for the PC-FX, which is based on the GNU Compiler Collection version 2.95.1. The Mednafen author began work on a library for the compiler called pcfxlib but it was discontinued due to lack of interest until trap15 started development of a new library called liberis. The toolchain is designed for a Linux environment, although it can also be used with cygwin. To date, no Homebrew titles for the PC-FX have been released, although Aetherbyte Studios and Eponasoft have both expressed interest in developing new software for the console.

=== PlayStation ===
Making games on the PlayStation is possible with any model of the system through the use of a modchip or the double 'Swap Trick'. There is also a softmod/save game exploit called "tonyhax". Requirements consist of a PC, SDK, and a 'Comms Link' device to upload and download files to and from the console.

Another way of starting homebrew on the PlayStation is 'UniROM', which is a Softmod. UniROM works by being installed onto a cheat-device, which is connected via the parallel-port (on old consoles) and allows loading of custom code via burned CDs and the serial port.

Homebrew was originally promoted by Sony with the Net Yaroze, which had a large scene for quite some time. However, the official Net Yaroze site was shut down in mid-2009, and Sony stopped supporting the system as well as the users who still owned the console.

=== Saturn ===
All models of the Sega Saturn can be used for hobbyist development. Modchips for the Saturn Model 1 have been scarce for some time, as it seems that no one has produced any new modchips in years. As such, the only two options left are to either perform the swap trick or extensively modify a Saturn Model 2 modchip.

Running homebrew on the Model 2 can be accomplished by bridging two points on the modchip, soldering a wire from the modchip to the Saturn power supply, and inserting it where the CD-ROM ribbon cable inserts. Performing a swap trick on the Model 2 is more difficult than the Model 1 version due to the lack of an access light.

Another method is what is known as the "PseudoSaturn" unlocking method. It is a program created by CyberWarrior2000 that abuses the "Pro Action Replay" cartridge's firmware. It unlocks region, frequency, and CD protection of most Saturn models. Either a modded Saturn or a swap trick is required to run the installer, which loads the code in the FlashROM of the cartridge. Afterwards, the cartridge unlocks everything and most software can be run, from backups to homebrews.

There is also now a new engine for development called the Jo-Engine created by Johannes Fetz to allow easy development of 2D games. This engine is currently able to compile 2D games without the Sega Graphic Libraries (SGL). Another engine by XL2, called the Z-Treme engine, led to the creation of a fully 3D Sonic the Hedgehog game called Sonic Z-Treme. Z-Treme uses Sega Basic Libraries (SBL) and Sega Graphic Libraries (SGL).

=== Virtual Boy ===
Nintendo's Virtual Boy has no region lock, but it was not until the flash carts FlashBoy and FlashBoy+ were released that the homebrew scene began to grow. Two previously unreleased games, Bound High! and Niko-Chan Battle (the Japanese version of Faceball) have been released.

In 2015, a dedicated fan ported Konami's cyberpunk point-and-click Snatcher over to the Virtual Boy platform. Red Square, a Yume Nikki fan game was created in six weeks for the 2019 Dream Diary Jam.

=== Nintendo 64 ===
Bung Enterprises released the Doctor V64 shortly after the launch of the Nintendo 64 in 1996, which was originally a CD-based unit that acted both as a game backup device and a development kit for the system. It provided a cost-effective solution for game development on the platform, as Nintendo's official development units and tools for the system were too expensive to obtain at the time, though this status would eventually lead to legal issues and conflict with Nintendo, which led to the units becoming illegal for sale in the United States. Despite this, the V64 (as well as the redesigned Doctor V64 Jr. in 1998) was popular with homebrew developers for many years, with the homebrew and demoscene for the system beginning as early as 1997. The V64 was also used by some official developers for the system, which was used to create games such as Turok: Dinosaur Hunter.

Between 1998 and 1999, "Presence Of Mind" (POM) contests were held by the now-defunct website Dextrose, which was an N64 demoscene competition where hobbyists can submit their N64 program, game, or utility. Each entrant participating in the competition used V64 units. Bung Enterprises promoted the event and supplied prizes (usually Doctor V64 related accessories). Though a POM competition was planned in 2000, interest in the system was starting to wane at that time, and so it was never held. Entries submitted during these competitions can still be found online in an archived form.

From 2000 to 2006, homebrew development on the N64 has remained stagnant after the console lost interest and was eventually discontinued in April 2002, however it was revitalized by the development and release of flash cartridges for the N64 that allowed homebrew and ROM hacks for the console to be run natively on the hardware. In May 2006, the NeoMyth flash cartridge was released as one of the earliest flash cartridges to be developed for the N64. Ukrainian developer krikzz, later to be known for his Everdrive line of flash cartridges, began to develop a flash cartridge for the N64 as early as July 2009 before releasing it as the Everdrive 64 in June 2011; this flash cart was also used for homebrew development. In April 2010, the 64drive, a developer-friendly flash cartridge for running custom programs and code, was released by developer Marshall H. Hobbyist Jennifer Taylor also started work on an open-source SDK for N64 homebrew development known as "LibDragon" beginning in May 2009.

In August 2020, members of the N64 homebrew scene established a wiki known as the N64Brew Wiki, providing accurate documentation of the N64, its peripherals, and related software. The site also hosted annual game jam development competitions since its inception, which focused on game creation rather than the demoscene of the old POM competitions in the late 1990s. It also held interviews with the judges and developers behind the games they worked on, including former N64 developers such as Allan Findlay, David Doak, Neil Voss, and Giles Goddard.

A tech demo for the Nintendo 64 showing clipmapping, which allows 40 MB of texture data to be rendered using the console's built-in 4 MB of RAM

Junk Runner 64, an open world tech demo by James Lambert

As of December 2022, the N64 still has an active homebrew community, moreso than its early days in the late 1990s and early 2000s, and continues to receive various games and utilities created by members of the community, with over 6,000 members being active in the hacking and homebrew scene. Prominent tech demos for the N64 have also been created by a handful of homebrew and demoscene members that pushed the limits of the console as well as showcasing some technical feats running on stock hardware, including those by hobbyist James Lambert, who implemented clipmapping (including MegaTextures), virtual reality headset support and a modern-sized open world comparable to that of The Elder Scrolls V: Skyrim.

A number of homebrew emulators for older gaming systems and computers are also available for the N64, including the NES, SNES, Neo Geo, Game Boy and Game Boy Color. ScummVM also received a port for the N64.

The 16-bit top-down shooter Xeno Crisis has received a version for the N64, released on physical ROM cartridge.

== Sixth generation consoles ==
=== Dreamcast ===
Despite its short commercial lifespan of less than two years in North America, the Dreamcast benefits from an active homebrew scene even ten years after its discontinuation. Due to a flaw in the Dreamcast's BIOS, which was intended for use with MIL-CD's, the console can run software from a CD-R without the use of a modchip. Sega responded to this by removing MIL-CD support from the BIOS on all Dreamcast consoles manufactured from November 2000 onwards.

The console is especially notable for its commercial homebrew scene. One notable project was the Bleemcast! emulator, which was a series of bootdisks made to play PlayStation games on the system, featuring visual enhancements over the original console. Newer independent releases include Last Hope, released by RedSpotGames, and DUX, both Shoot 'em up style games. These releases were written using the KallistiOS development system. A port of the freeware high-level development language Fenix and BennuGD is available for use in game development; many DIV Games Studio games have been ported and others were originally written for the system.

=== PlayStation 2 ===
Early versions of the PlayStation 2 have a buffer overflow bug in the part of the BIOS that handles PS1 game compatibility; hackers found a way to turn this into a loophole called the PS2 Independence Exploit (released in August 2003), allowing the use of homebrew software. Other options for homebrew development would be the use of a modchip or the utilization of a PS2 hard drive and HD Loader. In Europe and Australia, the PS2 came with a free Yabasic interpreter on the bundled demo disc for some time. This allows simple programs to be created for the PS2 by the end-user. This was included in a failed attempt to circumvent a UK tax by defining the console as a "computer" if it contained certain software. A port of the NetBSD project and BlackRhino GNU/Linux, an alternative Debian-based distribution, are also available for the PS2.

Sony released an official Linux-based operating system for the PS2 in 2002, with the contents of the kit including a keyboard, mouse, Network Adaptor and HDD. The North American versions were discontinued a year after the kits quickly went out of stock not too long afterwards, however the European version was still available for quite some time. The kit boots by installing a proprietary interface (the run-time environment) from a region-encoded DVD, meaning that the North American and European kits would only work with PS2 systems from their respective regions.

A more recent development called Free McBoot or FMCB (first released in May 2008) allows homebrew programs to be launched without a trigger disc required by the older exploit (Independence Exploit), and also allows the use of homebrew on unmodded systems without a functional disc drive. Installation of the exploit to each individual memory card however requires either an already exploited/modded system in order to launch the installer, or a boot image that can load an app to boot into Executable and Linkable Format (ELF) binaries (a network adapter and HDD is also required). The installation is keyed to the Memory Card and will only be usable on the same version consoles that it was originally installed on, unless a Multi-Install is performed. The only drawback to this exploit is that it needs to be installed/compiled on each individual memory card. Simply copying from one memory card to another will not work. This exploit does not work on the latest slimline PS2s manufactured since late 2008 (the later SCPH-9000x models with BIOS 2.30 and newer), but will work on all models prior to that. The newest versions of Free McBoot (version 1.90 and newer) also have the ability to install and boot from both Sony and non-Sony HDDs when using an original "fat" model PS2 and network adapter; this support is called Free HDBoot or FHDB. With a few minor issues, it is now possible to play games entirely from the HDD without the need to use an optical disc drive nor a physical memory card. Free McBoot and Free HDBoot is also notable for allowing the user to copy PS1/PS2 save files from a Memory Card to a USB drive, a functionality normally only possible with tools such as DexDrive.

After installing an exploit, unsigned executables (in ELF format) may be launched from a Memory Card or a USB drive. Such programs include emulators, media players, hard drive management tools, and PC-based or NAS-based file shares. Using homebrew programs (e.g. 'SMS Media Player') it is possible to listen to various audio file formats (MP3, OMA, Ogg Vorbis, AAC, FLAC, AC3), and watch various video formats (DivX/XviD, MPEG1, MPEG2, MPEG4-ASP in AVI Container) using the console. Games and other unsigned software can also be played and run on any device connected to the console (i.e. external USB/FireWire thumb drive/hard disk drive (FAT32 and exFAT only), internal hard disk drive on early revision consoles, network shares (Windows Network or PS2 host: protocol), and CD-R(W)/DVD±R(W) optical discs (modded systems or patched discs)). A number of homebrew emulators of older computer and gaming systems have also been developed for the PS2.

=== GameCube ===
Homebrew development on the Nintendo GameCube tended to be difficult, since it uses a proprietary MiniDVD-based drive and media as opposed to the standard DVD drives of the PS2 and Xbox for piracy protection. Also, its connectivity is limited, as it does not feature a USB port or an HDD port like the PlayStation 2.

The barrier to burning Nintendo GameCube discs with a consumer DVD burner is the Burst Cutting Area, a "barcode" in the innermost ring of the disc, an area inaccessible to most burners and writeable only by very expensive disc pressing machines. For a long time, the only way to run homebrew software on Nintendo GameCube was through a patching-system exploit of Phantasy Star Online Episode I & II, requiring users to find the game and a Broadband Adapter. Both of these are difficult to find because a follow-up has been released (under the name Phantasy Star Online Episode I & II Plus) and thus the original PSO was rarely sold after then, and because the Broadband Adapter was not often carried in stores due to the Nintendo GameCube's very limited selection of online games.

In August 2019, a method that uses an Action Replay in conjunction with an SD card adapter inserted into the memory card slot allowed the user to run homebrew from the SD card or over Ethernet. Another method involved using a modchip to allow the GameCube to run homebrew from a MiniDVD-R via the disc drive. Another method used a save game exploit which involves transferring modified game save files to a GameCube memory card that triggers arbitrary code execution when loaded by an official game, allowing custom software to be run from a memory card, SD card, or other media. As the Nintendo GameCube's case does not fit a full-size DVD-R, third party replacement cases are available.

As of November 2026, the most common methods include modchips such as Picoboot, which uses a Raspberry Pi Pico as a cost-effective modchip, while other mod chips such as Team OffBroadway's FlippyDrive, which uses a flex ribbon cable placed in between the optical drive and optical drive connector inside the console to connect to a custom board with a microSD Card slot as a solder-free solution. Another way is using the PicoLoader, another modchip that uses the solder-free style cable of the FlippyDrive and the cost effective Raspberry Pi Pico as a cheap and solderless solution.

Homebrew software for the Nintendo GameCube mainly consist of emulators for other systems, as well as several popular homebrew utilities. Swiss is an "all-in-one homebrew utility" that has a file browser, as well as the ability to force software to use different video modes that aren't officially supported such as progressive scan or 16:9 widescreen. The Game Boy Interface is a homebrew software frontend for the Game Boy Player peripheral, often used for capturing high-quality footage from Game Boy, Game Boy Color, and Game Boy Advance games.

The 16-bit top-down shooter Xeno Crisis has received a version for the GameCube, released on physical optical disc and playable on modded systems only.

=== Xbox ===
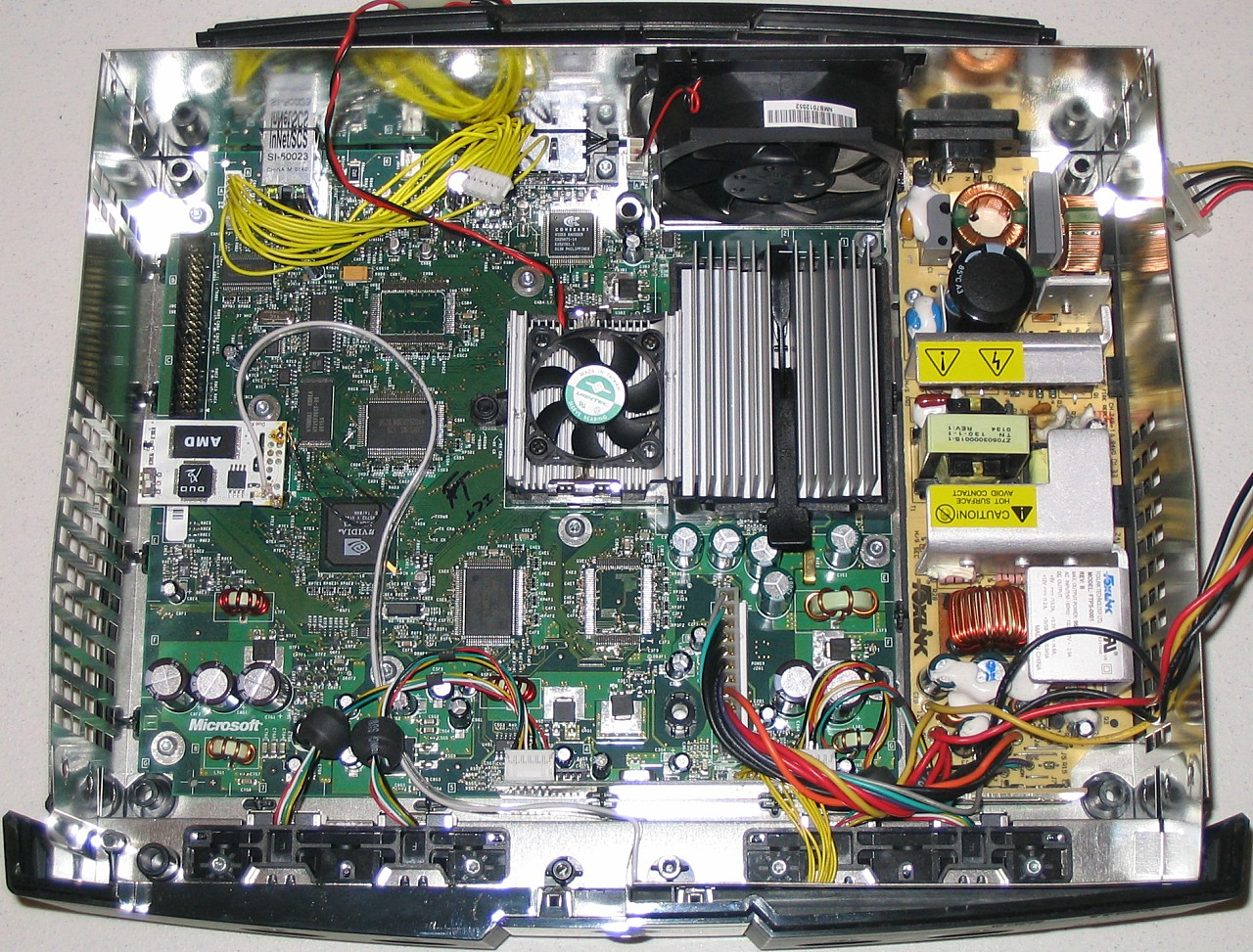
Microsoft Xbox with a modchip installed

The Xbox console uses several measures, including cryptographically signed code to obfuscate firmware. The primary method of executing homebrew code required installing a mod chip which could be flashed with a modified Microsoft BIOS. This BIOS allowed the system to boot unsigned executables (XBEs) and control several hardware variables, such as region coding and video mode. With the leak of Microsoft's official development kit (XDK), homebrew coders were able to write replacement Xbox GUIs (known as dashboards), games and applications for the Xbox.

A softmod, which uses a commercial game such as 007: Agent Under Fire, Mech Assault, or Tom Clancy's Splinter Cell, had been created to execute a persistent softmod installer without modification of the hardware. This method utilizes modified font and sound files to cause the Xbox to cause a stack buffer overflow and load a homebrew dashboard. Once in this condition, the Xbox is able to execute homebrew games and applications upon boot up. Such softmods include the Rocky5 soft modding tool (which has methods that the retail games needed are optional).

Due to the Xbox using standard PC libraries, writing homebrew games is relatively easy and the vast majority of libraries available for a PC programmer are available to an Xbox homebrew programmer.

One of the more common type of homebrew games for the Xbox are ports of PC games whose source has been publicly released or leaked. Many classic PC games have been released for Xbox, but most are created with the XDK which limits their availability. The only places to find these ports are through IRC or peer-to-peer browsers.

The Xbox system is also very adept at running emulators ported from the PC given its high processing power. It is able to emulate systems up to the previous generation, including the Nintendo 64 and the PlayStation. For this reason, many different emulators have been created for or ported to the Xbox.

A community-run replacement for its now-discontinued Xbox Live service is known as Insignia, which provides many of the features that were supported by the former service in select games (see below).

=== Game Boy Advance ===
Homebrew development for the Game Boy Advance has been popular due to the availability of C compilers and ready-made, high-quality code libraries, as well as debugging features for several Game Boy Advance emulators such as VisualBoyAdvance (including VisualBoyAdvance-M), mGBA, NO$GBA, and Mesen. The Pokémon ROM hacking community and the wide availability of flash cartridges and ROM copiers for the system also influenced homebrew development for the system.

== Seventh generation consoles ==
=== Nintendo DS ===
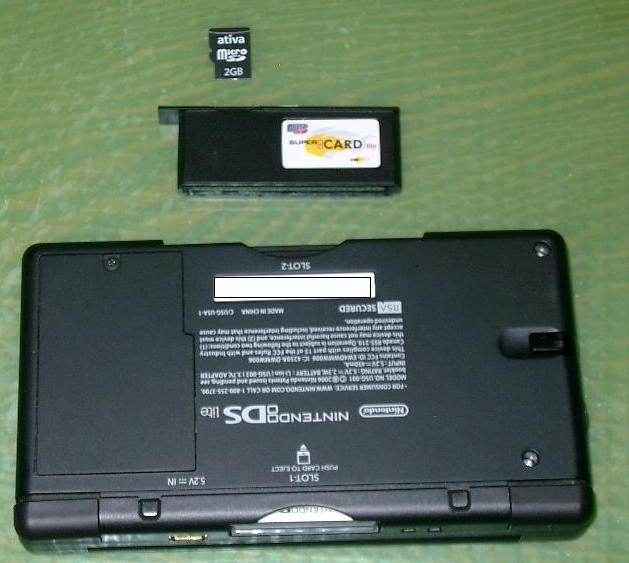
Nintendo DS Lite with SuperCard DS Lite flash cartridge and microSD card

Since the release of the Nintendo DS, a great deal of hacking has occurred involving the DS's fully rewritable firmware, Wi-Fi connection, flash cartridges with support for SD storage (such as R4 cartridges), and software use. There are now many emulators for the DS, as well as the NES, SNES, Sega Master System, Sega Mega Drive, Neo-Geo Pocket, the Neo-Geo MVS arcade platform, and older handheld consoles like the Game Boy Color.

There are a number of flash cartridges or cards which either have built-in flash memory or an SD card slot (in both standard and "micro" formats). These typically enable DS gamers to use their system to play MP3s and videos, as well as other non-gaming functions traditionally reserved for separate devices.

In South Korea, many video game consumers exploit illegal copies of video games, including for the Nintendo DS. In 2007, 500,000 copies of DS games were sold, while the sales of the DS hardware units was 800,000.

Another modification device called Action Replay, manufactured by the company Datel, is a device which allows the user to input cheat codes that allows it to hack games, granting the player infinite health, power-ups, access to any part of the game, infinite in game currency, the ability to walk through walls, and various other abilities depending on the game and code used.

Photographer Steve Chapman, looking for other ways to continue his photography work with smaller equipment, created DS-DSLR, an application that allowed him to control his camera without his bulky laptop. When his camera was connected to the DS through the GBA cartridge slot, DS-DSLR allowed him to execute many tasks, including controlled bracketing, custom interval shots, and timed long exposures. DS-DSLR even had a noise-activated shutter control which was activated when the DS mic detected noise.

The DSi also has some homebrew exploits, some of which use DSiWare apps such as Flipnote Studio (aka ugopwn), sudokuhax, using a game called Sudoku by EA Games, grtpwn, exidiahax, fieldrunhax, 4swordhax, UNO*hax, and an exploit using Petit Computer called petit-compwner. There is also systemflaaw, which uses the DSi-exclusive game System Flaw.

A user by the name of shutterbug2000 on GBAtemp has released two DSi exploits, one being called Memory Pit, an exploit using the DSi Camera app, and the other known as the Flipnote Lenny exploit (aka ugopwn), using Flipnote Studio.

=== Xbox 360 ===
Microsoft has released a version of its proprietary Software Development Kit (SDK) for free, to would-be homebrew programmers. This SDK, called XNA Game Studio, is a free version of the SDK available to professional development companies and college students. However, to create Xbox 360 games one must pay for a premium membership to the XNA Creators Club. Once the games are verified, the games written with XNA Studio can be made available for 80, 240, or 400 Microsoft Points to all Xbox 360 owners (through Xbox Live). This allows creators of homebrew content access to their target audience of Xbox 360 owners. This content is available under the Indie Games section of the New Xbox Experience.

On March 20, 2007, it was announced that a hack using the previously discovered hypervisor vulnerability in the Xbox 360 kernel versions 4532 and 4548 had been developed to allow users to run XeLL, a Linux bootloader. The initial hack was beyond the average user and required an Xbox serial cable to be installed and a flashed DVD Drive firmware. Felix Domke, the programmer behind XeLL, has since announced a live bootable Linux CD suitable for novice users, with the capabilities to be installed to the SATA hard drive of the Xbox 360. Despite the availability of such a distribution, the Xbox 360 still isn't considered a popular platform for homebrew development, given the dependence of the exploit on the DVD-ROM being able to load a burnt DVD game, a modified version of the game Peter Jackson's King Kong, and two older kernel revisions of the console itself. A group independent of Microsoft was working on the means to run homebrew code, as part of the Free60 project.

Note: The hypervisor vulnerability in the Xbox 360 kernel versions 4532 and 4548 was addressed by Microsoft with the release of the NXE system and dashboard update in 2008.

Homebrew was since re-enabled on any Xbox 360 with dash 2.0.7371.0 or lower via an exploit referred to as the JTAG / SMC hack but was promptly patched again by Microsoft with the 2.0.8495.0 update.

Homebrew has now become available on most Xbox 360 consoles due to the Reset Glitch Hack. It works on all current dashboards up to the latest revision. Because the Reset Glitch Hack required a modchip, soldering skills are a necessity when attempting to use this exploit. It was patched in the Winchester revisions of the Xbox 360 with mitigations in the hardware.

In early 2025, a software-based exploit known as Bad Update was introduced, which involves a race condition with the hypervisor in software. It depends on an exploit found in Tony Hawk's American Wasteland and Rock Band Blitz, and works on all Xbox 360 consoles up to the latest Winchester revisions without the need of a modchip or directly modifying the console's hardware (as what was previously done with the JTAG and Reset Glitch Hack exploits). A fork of Bad Update, ABadAvatar, was introduced later that year, which involves a race condition with the Xbox Live Avatar sign-in system after the console has booted up rather than the hypervisor, and does not depend on a game to trigger the exploit. Both Bad Update and ABadAvatar are non-persistent exploits however, and will revert back to a stock configuration once it has been turned off, meaning that the exploit must be rerun every time the Xbox 360 is turned on.

Though hardware-based exploits such as the JTAG and Reset Glitch Hack are still the preferred methods of hacking the Xbox 360 for homebrew, Bad Update and ABadAvatar allowed for easier accessibility to homebrew for users who are not experienced with hardware modding or soldering skills, and also allowed homebrew to work on the later Winchester revisions of the console which patched out the Reset Glitch Hack exploit.

=== PlayStation 3 ===
The PlayStation 3 was designed to run other operating systems from day one. Very soon after launch, the first users managed to install Fedora Linux Core 5 onto the PlayStation 3 via the "Install Other OS" option in the system's XrossMediaBar (XMB), which also allows configuring the PlayStation 3 to boot into the other OS installed by default. So far, several Linux distributions have been made to install successfully on the PlayStation 3, including Fedora Core 5 and 6, Gentoo, Ubuntu, and Yellow Dog Linux (YDL). The latter comes installed with the Cell SDK by default, allowing a low cost entry into Cell programming.

Originally, graphics support was limited to framebuffer access only, with no access to the RSX Reality Synthesizer graphics processor chip, however some access to the RSX was achieved, which was blocked with firmware update 2.10. Homebrew developers do have access to the Cell microprocessor, including 6 of its 7 active Synergistic Processing Elements (SPEs). The Game OS resides under a hypervisor and prevents users from taking full control of the PlayStation 3's hardware. This is a security measure which helps Sony feel secure enough to allow users to install other operating systems on the PS3.

The Sixaxis controller has also been exposed to Linux and Windows, but no driver seems to have been successfully created yet that exposes its accelerometer functions, except for Motioninjoy. However, other drivers have successfully used it as a controller for gaming and other uses. The DualShock 3 controller has drivers made available by software such as DsHidMini and DS4Windows (initially created for the DualShock 4). The Steam client also features built-in support for the controller.

In May 2008, a vulnerability was found in the PlayStation 3 allowing users to install a partial debug firmware on a regular console. However, the debug functions are disabled, so homebrew applications and backup games cannot be run yet.

Another exploit was found on August 14, 2008, allowing users to boot some backup games from the PlayStation 3's HDD, although the exact instructions on how to do this were not released at that time. However, a different person posted instructions 10 days later, which explained the exploit.

On January 6, 2009, a hacking ring named Sh4d0ws leaked the jig files needed to launch the PlayStation 3 into service mode. Although the PlayStation 3 can be triggered into service mode, it is not yet of any use because the files needed to make changes to the console have not been leaked.

"Other OS" functionality was removed in firmware update 3.21 in April 2010, with Sony stating that it was removed in response to several "security concerns"; this led to a lawsuit in 2011, which was ultimately settled in 2016.

On August 31, 2010, PSGroove, an exploit for the PS3 through the USB port, was released and made open source. This exploit works on all of the PS3 models released up until then. A guide for the creation of the PSGroove is available through several online sources.

George Hotz, better known under his nickname "geohot", appeared on Attack of the Show! because he released the PlayStation 3's encryption keys, therefore any homebrew or custom firmware can be signed. Once signed, homebrew can be natively run. It would be difficult for Sony to fix this because it would most likely require a voluntary recall and the costliest parts would need replacing. In 2011, Sony, with help from law firm Kilpatrick Stockton, sued Hotz and associates of the group fail0verflow for their jailbreaking activities. Charges included violating the DMCA, CFAA, copyright law, and California's CCDAFA, and for breach of contract (related to the PlayStation Network User Agreement), tortious interference, misappropriation, and trespass.

Recent homebrew efforts included the development of PS3HEN, which allows for the execution of homebrew. It exploits certain unpatched system files that are installed through the system updater, and must be re-enabled after powering off the system. PS3HEN is compatible with all PlayStation 3 models, including later patched Slim and Super Slim models, as an alternative for those that cannot install conventional custom firmware.

=== Wii ===
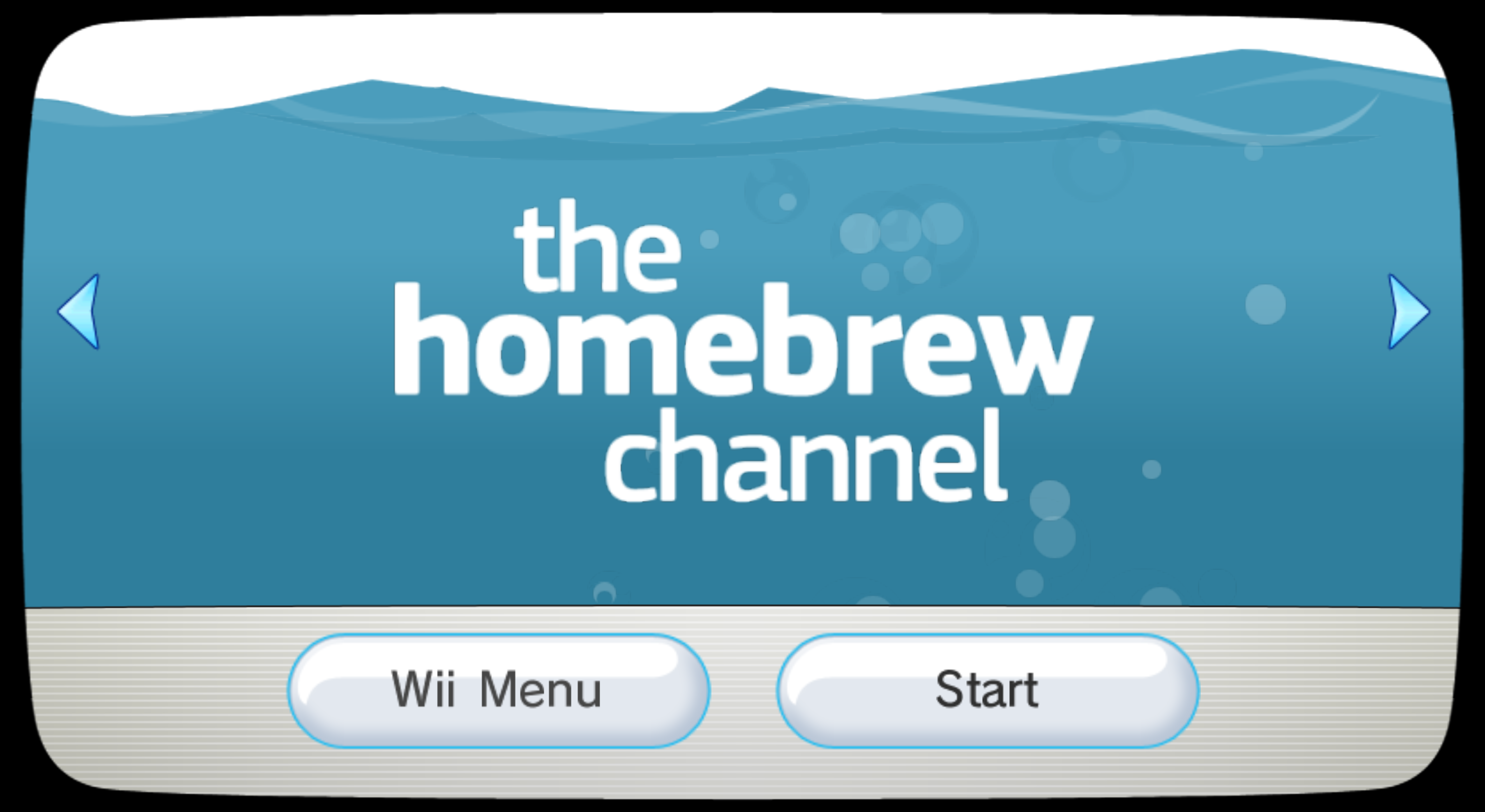
The Homebrew Channel banner appearing on the Wii Menu

In advance of the Wii's release, WiiCade was the first site to host Adobe Flash homebrew games specifically designed for the Wii and its remote, which could be played without any exploits using the Wii's Opera web browser. The Wii Opera software development kit lets developers make their own games for the Wii via JavaScript.

The Wii was hacked in December 2007, via a method that involves a pair of tweezers to bridge pins in the Wii's memory module in order to access parts of Wii system memory in GameCube mode and obtain the console's encryption keys, as well as a custom serial interface. In 2008, Team Twiizers (named after the aforementioned hack, now known as fail0verflow) released an exploit called the Twilight Hack which takes advantage of a buffer overflow vulnerability found in the Wii version of The Legend of Zelda: Twilight Princess that utilizes a malformed save file to load an ELF file (boot.elf) into memory (if present in the root directory of the SD card), which will then run unsigned code.

The goal of most Wii exploits today is to install The Homebrew Channel, a custom channel that lets users run homebrew software on the console. Its first full release was in December 2008. Though Nintendo has successfully patched various older exploits to install The Homebrew Channel, many exploits to run the channel on current firmware exist. Note that only exploits that use disc games are compatible with installing The Homebrew Channel on the vWii (virtual Wii) mode on a Wii U (with the exception of "wuphax", an exploit that installs the channel via Wii U-specific system permission exploits). The console's controller was also a popular target for modification.

As of 2025, various other exploits other than the Twilight Hack exist that can hack the Wii for homebrew and allow for the installation of The Homebrew Channel from supported games and on specific system software revisions, including (but not limited to) Smash Stack (using an exploit found within the game's stage editor in NTSC releases of Super Smash Bros. Brawl), BannerBomb (using a malformed Channel; patched in firmware version 4.3), LetterBomb (using the Wii's Messaging Board), WilBrand (LetterBomb alternative that supports firmware versions 3.0 to 4.3), FlashHax (using the Internet Channel), str2hax (using a DNS exploit in the Wii's EULA), and BlueBomb (using Bluetooth).

Most exploits for the console typically requires the use of an SD card as they expect the ELF loader file (boot.elf) to be present on the root of the medium. However, some exploits such as FlashHax, str2hax and BlueBomb do not require the use of an SD card in order to exploit the Wii as they can download the ELF loader file directly off the internet (depending on the console model) if the SD card itself or the ELF loader file on the SD card is not present. BlueBomb in particular also allowed for the Wii Mini to become hackable for the first time, which was a hardware revision of the Wii released late in its lifecycle that was deemed "unhackable" by many users prior to the exploit's release, mainly due to the lack of an SD card slot and internet connectivity on the Wii Mini.

== Eighth/ninth generation consoles ==
=== Nintendo 3DS ===
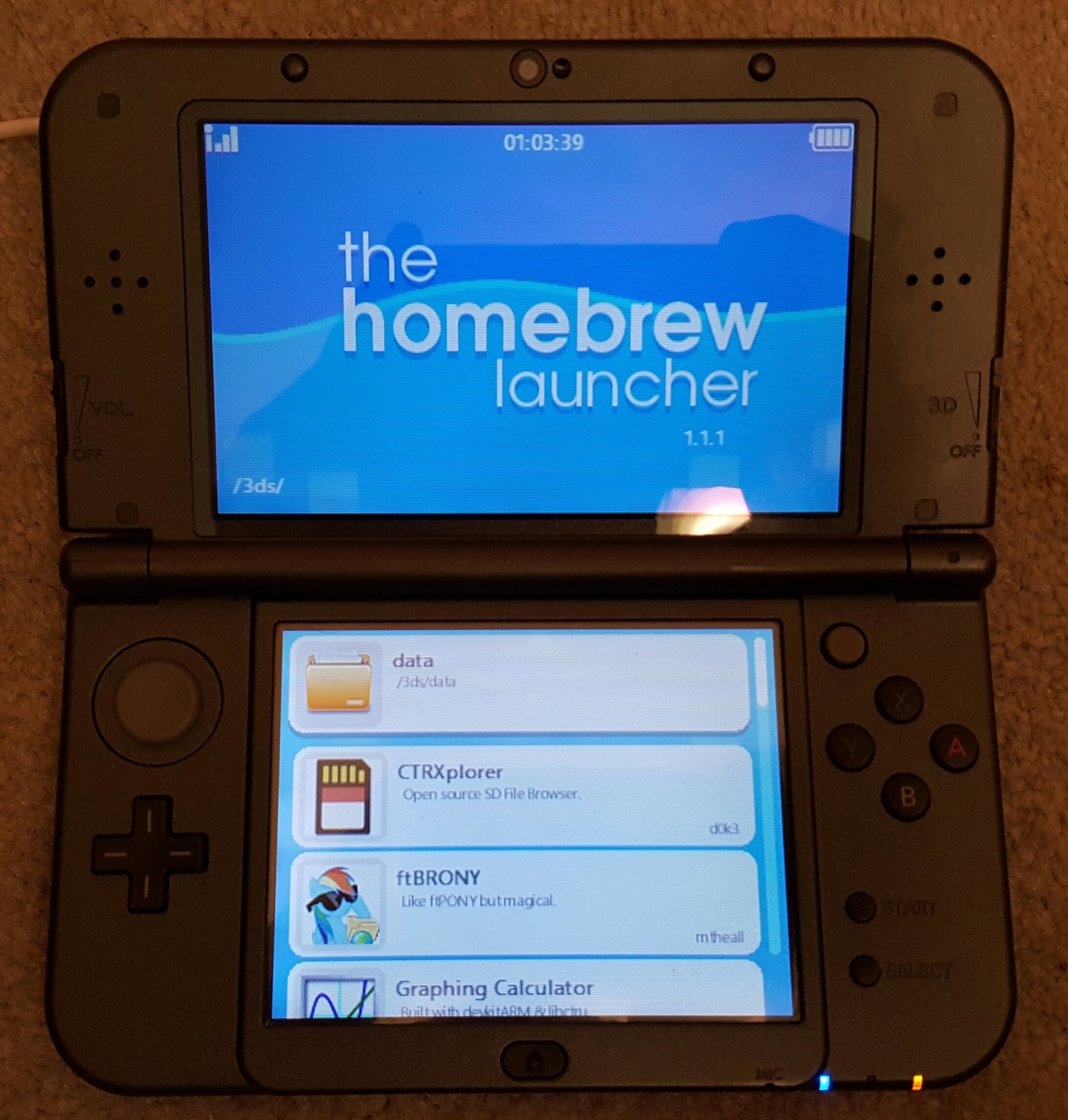
A New Nintendo 3DS XL running The Homebrew Launcher

To directly install custom software onto the Nintendo 3DS' home menu, custom firmware is needed. There are several custom firmware releases available, the most popular being Luma3DS. Requirements to install custom firmware involve using various exploits to run a boot ROM exploit called boot9strap, which executes custom code before boot ROM lockout. Similar to Wii, the 3DS has its own custom software known as The Homebrew Launcher, which allows homebrew software to run on the system. The Homebrew Launcher can be installed after performing an exploit.

The first public homebrew exploit for the 3DS, ninjhax, originally called ssspwn, allowed the user to scan a QR Code to exploit the game Cubic Ninja. Other ways to run The Homebrew Launcher have been discovered since then, including (but not limited to) freakyhax, an exploit in the Deluxe edition of Freakyforms: Your Creations, Alive!; Doodlebomb, an exploit in the 1.1.1 and older versions of Swapdoodle; browserhax, broswerhax-xl, SSloth browser, and super-skaterhax (all of which used the 3DS' Internet Browser with the latter exclusive to New 3DS models); soundhax, using the Nintendo 3DS Sound app; pichaxx, using Pokémon Picross; unSAFE_MODE, which injects a corrupted WiFi profile into the SAFE_MODE firmware; kartdlphax and Kartminer7, both using Mario Kart 7; MSET9, which utilizes an exploit in the System Settings application; ntrboot, using an NDS/DSi flash cart; and smashbroshax, a New 3DS exclusive exploit for Super Smash Bros. for Nintendo 3DS.

After installing custom firmware, several things can be done on the system, such as being able to play games that were region-locked on any regional system, install and launch games, homebrew apps, emulators and other unsigned software directly from the home menu, and also obtain ROM images of games from game cards inserted directly into the system. Homebrew applications for the 3DS often include features that are only available on exploited/modded systems; for instance, PC games can be streamed on the 3DS via a homebrew streaming application called Moonlight, which is built on an open-source version of the Nvidia GameStream protocol, allowing games to be controlled via the system with the top screen acting as a computer display, the bottom screen as a keyboard, and the buttons acting as the buttons on a game controller. Other homebrew applications can also allow for the 3DS to be used as a game controller for the same reason as well. Various homebrew emulators are also available for the 3DS, including the RetroArch frontend and Red Viper, the latter of which is a Virtual Boy emulator for the 3DS.

Unsigned software can be launched from the SD card without having to install custom firmware on the device by using an exploit to run The Homebrew Launcher. The Homebrew Launcher itself can be launched on system versions 9.0-11.16 on any 3DS system. However, without installing custom firmware, the user will need to run the exploit each time they want to access The Homebrew Launcher.

The majority of system updates that have "Further improvements to overall system stability and other minor adjustments have been made to enhance the user experience" in their changelog are simply to patch Homebrew Launcher (userland) exploits. Those that require a specific version of a game or application are often patched in these updates by adding exploited application versions to the "IsTitleAllowed" blacklist, which prevents outdated applications on the list from launching and forces users to update those applications to the latest version to launch the application. For example, notehax only works on outdated versions of Flipnote Studio 3D. In the 11.6.0-39 system update, all regions of Flipnote Studio version <=1.0.1 in USA, <=1.2.0 in EUR, and <=1.3.1 in JPN were blocked from launching the application, patching the exploit on current firmware.

In December 2020, an exploit was released that used an oversight in DSiWare, which can run custom code from the DSiWare menu in the 3DS settings app to install the 3DS hacks. The majority of exploits for the system were patched out by the 11.17.0-50 system update as of May 2023, with the exception of MSET9 (for all 3DS models), super-skaterhax (for New 3DS models) and ntrboot (for all 3DS models as a fallback for the MSET9 and super-skaterhax exploits).

=== PlayStation 4 ===
In 2015, an exploit for the PlayStation 4 was released for firmware 1.76 and below which grants kernel access. It was the first known public exploit for the PS4. The userland exploit targeted the native PlayStation web browser and was colloquially referred to as a "webkit exploit". This was chained with the kernel exploit named "BadIRET" allowing it to execute unsigned code and access the kernel through exploiting the PS4's kernel vulnerabilities previously discovered in Linux and FreeBSD. This exploit took advantage of the webkit entrypoint and its "just-in-time" execution to gain kernel access to the PS4 and enable homebrew.

Over time, further exploits have been found that grant kernel level modifications to the system. All firmware versions except the latest that being 13.02 and 13.04 have been exploited to enable homebrew. Most of these use a webkit exploit as the entry point, but the PPPwn exploit targeting firmwares up to 11.00 uses a vulnerability found in the PlayStation 4 network settings and a computer to send payloads. The PSVue userland exploit targets the discontinued Sony streaming app PlayStation Vue and works by bridging the gap between low-privilege application code and high-privilege kernel memory, using the initial user-mode access to trigger vulnerabilities within kernel-mode drivers or system calls to enable homebrew. The exploit targets all firmware up to 13.02 and enables homebrew on all firmwares except 13.02 due to it not having a kernel exploit available. The PPPwn and PSVue exploits were patched in 11.02 and 13.04 respectively.

Homebrew on the PS4 includes being able to boot the PS4 into a Linux distribution, although this is not permanent and the console will revert to Orbis OS on reboot. Some payloads can patch games on the fly, such as 60 FPS for games that were never given official patches, character mods, and removal of intros and cutscenes. These patches can even work on physical retail discs inserted into the console; they are done at runtime in RAM and such leave the physical disc data intact.

=== PlayStation Vita ===
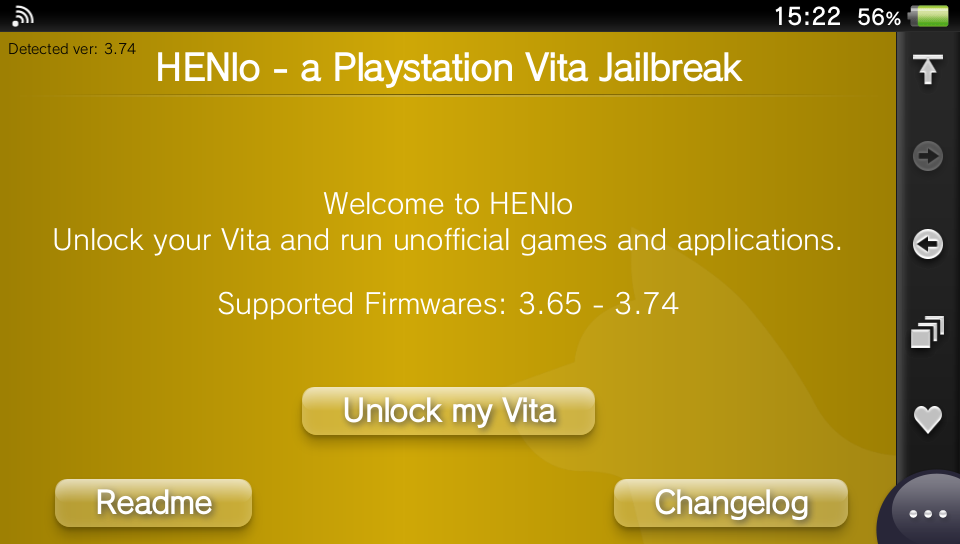
Screenshot of HENlo, a WebKit-based jailbreak for the PlayStation Vita

In 2016, an exploit for the PlayStation Vita was released named "HENkaku". This exploit used a bug found on the 3.60 system firmware, allowing users to run unsigned software. It was installed by visiting a website and clicking on the install button on the PlayStation Vita web browser. This had to be done every time the user turned the system on, and was patched in firmware version 3.61. However, in 2018, computer science student TheFloW (Andy Nguyen) found a kernel bug in firmware versions 3.65, 3.67, and 3.68 that allowed unsigned code to be run. Eventually, he developed an exploit called "h-encore" which allowed one to install the HENkaku hack on later PS Vita versions. The kernel bug was patched in firmware version 3.69, but the userland bug still works. Because HENkaku needs to be reinstalled every time the device is turned on, a program named ensō, which permanently flashes any custom firmware (including HENkaku) into the software, was created.

On February 13, 2019, TheFloW released a downgrader tool that can downgrade any Vita console to an older firmware down to its factory firmware.

On December 26, 2022, TheFloW released HENlo, a WebKit-based exploit chain for developers and security researchers on his GitHub page; a working implementation of the exploit which can be used on all Vita firmware versions was released by SKGleba.

=== Wii U ===
The most common way to execute code on the Wii U for 5.5.6 and below is through vulnerabilities in the Wii U's built-in web browser. Websites specifically made to exploit these vulnerabilities usually use them to run the Homebrew Launcher from the user's SD card, allowing for other unsigned programs to be run. The Homebrew Launcher could also be used to run or install custom firmware, such as Mocha or Haxchi. Haxchi could optionally be enabled on boot using Coldboot Haxchi, a modified version of Haxchi that runs the Virtual Console game it is installed to on boot.

In January 2022, Tiramisu and the EnvironmentLoader were released. EnvironmentLoader allows custom firmware, such as Tiramisu, to be automatically loaded on boot (similar to Coldboot Haxchi), but uses the console's Health and Safety Information app to run the exploit instead of a Virtual Console game. This removes the requirement to purchase a compatible Virtual Console game as well as reducing the risks of bricking the console. Later in September of that year, Aroma received its first public beta release, which uses the same exploit that EnvironmentLoader used, allowing for easier migration between the two. It also introduced modules, a new plugin system, and a new homebrew app format known as WUHB (shorthand for "Wii U HomeBrew") and RPX, the latter two of which negated the need for the Homebrew Launcher as ELF binaries are unsupported under Aroma. As such, unsigned software (in WUHB and RPX format) can only be installed and run via the Wii U's home menu, in a similar manner to the custom firmware on the 3DS. Many homebrew applications that run via the Homebrew Launcher (or by the Wii U's home menu in the case of Aroma) have been collected and hosted on fortheusers.org. These hosted applications can be downloaded directly on the Wii U using The Homebrew App Store app in the repository.

The Wii U's built-in Wii sandbox environment (often nicknamed vWii or Wii Mode) is capable of running Wii homebrew, such as The Homebrew Channel. However, due to changes made to the Wii operating system that runs in vWii mode, previous exploits that utilized the Wii Menu to load the HackMii Installer, such as Letterbomb, do not work. The only way to hack the vWii without using one of the exploit games is by using Wii U homebrew applications, such as wuphax or Compat Installer. The operating system changes also prevent some homebrew applications from functioning properly, requiring developers to create alternate versions to run on vWii.

=== Nintendo Switch and Nintendo Switch 2 ===
On March 14, 2017, 11 days after the release of the Nintendo Switch, the console was exploited by a team named ReSwitched with their exploit called PegaSwitch. It did not allow true homebrew to run on the system at the time, but it did let developers look for other security bugs in the system. Later on October 1 of that year, ReSwitched announced new exploits and tools that allowed homebrew developers to start working on homebrew programs for the system before they could be launched. At the 34th Chaos Communication Congress, hackers Plutoo, Derrek, and Naehrwert announced a kernel exploit for the system (which they explicitly said they would not release it to the public) and said that a homebrew launcher was coming soon.

The Nintendo Switch has both a homebrew launcher and custom firmware. The most notable, Atmosphère, is being developed alongside new system updates. The ability to install homebrew on the Nintendo Switch is dependent on the version of the console; access to a Japanese copy of Puyo Puyo Tetris was needed to install CFW on version 1.0.0. Original Switch models released before June 2018 had a full control TrustZone exploit that allows a custom-made RCM jig to be inserted into the right Joy-Con rail, allowing the system to enter a recovery mode that would otherwise not be accessible to regular users and thus access custom payloads that are sent through another device. Consoles that were released after June 2018 with version 4.1.0 shipped have their boot ROMs patched against this exploit that would allow for homebrew to be installed, so it is currently not possible to install homebrew to the original HAC-001 Nintendo Switch models with version 4.1.0 or higher installed (units manufactured after June 2018), the HAC-001(-01) revision of the Nintendo Switch (newer models with the Tegra X1+ SOC which patched the TrustZone exploit completely), the Nintendo Switch Lite and the OLED model of the Nintendo Switch officially known as the "Nintendo Switch – OLED Model" without the purchase and installation of a specialized modchip which replicates the vulnerability of the Tegra X1 chip. The installation requires soldering the modchip as opposed to utilizing an RCM jig on earlier models. In addition to running game backups, homebrewed Switches allow for the execution of homebrew, Android (up to Android 15 through LineageOS), and Linux distributions, allowing the system to be used as a fully-fledged Android tablet or ARM64 Linux computer - the latter in the same vein as the Steam Deck, though requiring extra software to run Windows games - respectively.

The succeeding Nintendo Switch 2 features hardened security measures that makes it significantly more difficult to install homebrew.

=== Xbox One, Series X, and Series S ===
The Xbox One and Series X/S have a Dev Mode which, though intended to be used for retail game development, can be used to run unsigned homebrew software. It can be enabled on any retail Xbox console. Dev Mode disables retail games and software while enabled. Homebrew software can be developed as Universal Windows Platform applications, allowing many programs designed to run on desktop editions of Windows 10 to run on the console including console emulators. In order to activate developer mode, one has to first register for an app developer account, which has a fee of $19.

=== PlayStation 5 ===
The PlayStation 5 is capable of running unsigned code on earlier firmware versions. A userland, kernel (and optionally hypervisor) exploit chain is required to be able to load homebrew on the PS5. As of April 2024, firmwares 3.00 to 4.51 is exploitable using an IPv6 kernel exploit that was originally patched on the PS4 but later resurfaced on the PS5. This exploit chain does not contain a hypervisor exploit, although a payload was created that works as a partial bypass to defeat enough security to run homebrew, dubbed libhijacker. Homebrew on the console includes patches (including unofficial 60/120 FPS patches for backwards-compatible PS4 games), cheats and fan speed adjustments, as well as the ability to temporarily boot into a Linux distribution similar to the PS4.

== Unofficial online services ==
In recent years, there have been efforts to restore old and defunct online services and servers for some online-capable game consoles and video games, typically those from the sixth generation onward. As many of these were shut down over time, hackers and modders have attempted to unofficially restore these via private, community-run servers or projects that are aimed at replicating or restoring online functionalities to various discontinued services and servers.

Access to these services typically requires a homebrew-enabled system to work, however there are some that can be accessed on an unmodified system such as private servers which can be accessed by adjusting DNS settings. For instance, several online-capable games for the PlayStation 2 and Dreamcast had their online functionalities restored via private servers, some of which require bypassing of authentication services such as the DNAS (Dynamic Network Authentication System) used on most online-capable PlayStation 2 games.

=== Xbox (original) ===
Insignia is a community-run online server for the original Xbox consoles in 2022 that served as a replacement for its now-defunct Xbox Live service (which was shut down in April 2010). It aims to replicate many of the features that were previously available on the now-discontinued service for the platform, and can be accessed by adjusting DNS settings on the console.

=== Wii ===
The Wii has its now-discontinued WiiConnect24 service (which was shut down in June 2013) restored by a project known as RiiConnect24 in 2015 that primarily aims to restore the WiiConnect24 service for Wii consoles that have been opened up for homebrew. WiiLink was another project in 2020 that restores WiiConnect24 as well as other online functionalities to homebrewed Wii consoles, of which was eventually merged with RiiConnect24 in 2023.

=== Nintendo 3DS and Wii U ===
Ahead of the discontinuation of the Nintendo Network for the Nintendo 3DS and Wii U in 2024, an unofficial fan-made project aimed at preserving most functionalities of the now-discontinued service known as the Pretendo Network or simply Pretendo emerged, providing several features such as online multiplayer, friends list, matchmaking and other online services such as Miiverse, and remains in active development. Initially, access to Pretendo requires a homebrew-enabled system (which is still the case for the 3DS as of 2026), as of April 2024 that is no longer the case, specifically in the case of the Wii U. The most notable games currently supported by Pretendo are Mario Kart 7, Mario Kart 8, Splatoon and Kid Icarus: Uprising, with other titles such as Steel Diver: Sub Wars, Pikmin 3 and Pokémon Rumble World being worked on for Pretendo support.

Pretendo's version of Miiverse contains a different interface that is not identical to the original service; as a result, another Miiverse revival project called Roseverse was created, which aimed at preserving Miiverse functionality as close as possible to the official (and now discontinued) service and is generally preferred to be the "better" version over Pretendo's version.

== See also ==
- Fangame
- Hacking of consumer electronics
- Jailbreak (computer science)
- Mod (video gaming)
- Modchip
- ROM hacking
- Softmod
