= Razion =

2014 video game

- Developer: NG:Dev.Team
- Publisher: NG:Dev.Team
- Designer: Timm Hellwig
- Artist: René Hellwig
- Composer: Andre Neumann
- Platforms: Neo Geo, Nintendo Switch
- Release: Neo Geo MVS: WW: December 1, 2014; Neo Geo AES: WW: July 2015; Nintendo Switch: WW: June 17, 2021
- Genre: Horizontally scrolling shooter
- Mode: Single-player
- Arcade system: Neo Geo MVS

Razion is a 2014 horizontally scrolling shooter video game developed and published by German indie team NG:Dev.Team for the Neo Geo. It is the fourth shoot 'em up title from NG:Dev.Team and their sixth game overall. Controlling a space fighter craft, the player must fight endless waves of enemies while avoiding collision with their projectiles and other obstacles.

First announced in mid-2014 for the Neo Geo, Razion bears resemblance to Fast Striker (2010), another shoot 'em up designed by NG:Dev.Team, due to its bullet hell-style approach. The music was composed by Andre Neumann, who previously scored music for DUX. Neumann was interested to score music for the game once he finished his work on Redux: Dark Matters, after René Hellwig told him that his brother Timm was looking for a musician who could make a psytrance soundtrack. A port for the Nintendo Switch under the title Razion EX was released in 2021, featuring several design changes compared to the original Neo Geo version.

== Gameplay ==
Neo Geo version screenshot

Razion is a science fiction-themed horizontally scrolling shoot 'em up game in which the player take control of a space fighter craft through six increasingly difficult stages in order to defeat an assortment of enemy forces and bosses. At the start, there are three difficulty modes to choose from: Novice, Original and Maniac. The player has only two weapons at their disposal: the main gun that travels a max distance of the screen's height and a powerful beam capable of dealing high-damage to any enemy caught within its blast radius.

The player can slowdown the ship's movement to avoid incoming bullets more precisely by pressing the A button in the Neo Geo version, which also produces a focused horizontal autofire shot. Tapping the A button enables the ship to fire bursts shots as well. The scoring system revolves around collecting gold cubes from destroyed enemies to charge up the beam. By shooting a charged up beam, gold cubes are turned green and grants higher score bonuses when picked up in this state. Getting hit by enemy fire will result in losing a life and once all lives are lost, the game is over unless the player inserts more credits into the arcade machine to continue playing.

== Development and release ==
Razion was first announced by NG:Dev.Team in mid-2014 for the Neo Geo and slated for an Autumn 2014 launch. NG:Dev.Team was responsible for the game's design, which bears resemblance to Fast Striker (2010) due to its bullet hell-style approach in contrast to Last Hope (2006) and DUX (2009), though the graphics were outsourced. Timm Hellwig served as both programmer and designer, while René Hellwig acted as art director and graphist. The soundtrack was composed by Andre Neumann, who previously scored music for DUX. According to Neumann, René told him that his brother Timm was looking for a composer who could make a psytrance soundtrack when working on the project, and he was interested to score the music after finishing his work on Redux: Dark Matters. Neumann stated that he used FL Studio, a Korg M50 and the Virus TI2 analog synthesizer when producing music for the game by observing its visuals.

Razion was released for the Neo Geo MVS on December 1, 2014, as two editions; a collector's edition limited to 100 units and a limited edition of 50 copies. At 1560 megabits of data, it is one of the largest games developed for the Neo Geo platform. The MVS release supports software updates via a USB port. In July 2015, a Neo Geo AES version was also released by NG:Dev.Team. Around the same time period, a music album was released by NG:Dev.Team and a digital album was distributed by Neumann through Bandcamp on September 12 the same year. A version for the Nintendo Switch titled Razion EX was released on June 17, 2021, while a digital release via Nintendo eShop launched on September 16 in North America and Europe. The Switch version features several changes compared to the original Neo Geo releases such as reworked gameplay, redesigned stages and improved visuals, among other features. Like the Neo Geo versions, the Switch version is available in both standard and limited editions, with the latter having 1500 copies manufactured and a second batch of 700 physical copies for the Switch version was produced by NGDEV.

== Reception ==
Reception

Review score
Publication	Score
TouchArcade	(NS) 4/5

Prior to launch, Razion was compared by gaming outlets such as RetroManiac and Retro Gamer with both Pulstar, Blazing Star and DUX due to its pre-rendered graphical style and bright color palette. Reviewing Razion EX, TouchArcade's Shaun Musgrave regarded it as a "high-quality shoot-em-up" on Nintendo Switch in vein of Blazing Star, commending the balanced difficulty modes, scoring system, vintage-style visuals and soundtrack.
