= Sturmwind =

2013 video game

- Developer: Duranik (Note: EX remaster co-developed with B-Alive Entertainment Software)
- Publisher: RedSpotGames (Note: Re-released by Duranik, JoshProd and RushOnGame without the original RedSpotGames branding, EX remaster published by B-Alive Entertainment Software)
- Designer: Johannes Graf
- Programmer: Roland Graf
- Artist: Johannes Graf
- Composers: Nils Feske; Henrik Jakoby
- Platforms: Dreamcast, Microsoft Windows, Nintendo Switch, Xbox One
- Release: Dreamcast: WW: April 24, 2013; Windows: WW: September 30, 2019; Switch, Xbox One: WW: November 08, 2019
- Genre: Scrolling shooter
- Mode: Single-player

Sturmwind is a 2013 scrolling shooter video game developed by German studio Duranik and originally published by RedSpotGames as an independent commercial release for the Dreamcast. It was re-released in 2016 and 2017, without the original RedSpotGames branding. A remastered version titled Sturmwind EX was also released for Microsoft Windows, Nintendo Switch and Xbox One. Controlling a space fighter craft, the player must fight endless waves of enemy forces while avoiding collision with their projectiles and other obstacles. The gameplay consist of vertical-scrolling and horizonal-scrolling stages, with players collecting three different weapon types in the vein of Thunder Force and Axelay.

Sturmwind garnered critical acclaim from reviewers since its release on Dreamcast; praise was given to its presentation, pre-rendered pseudo-3D visuals, responsive controls, accessible gameplay, balanced difficulty, boss encounters, weapon system, unlockable content and avoidance of European shoot 'em up tropes, but reviewers felt mixed regarding its Euro-style techno soundtrack, while criticism was geared towards its prolonged length in Normal Mode, sound design and difficulty to visually distinguish hazard elements on-screen. The EX remaster was also criticized for its lack of multiplayer mode and online leaderboards.

== Gameplay ==
Dreamcast version screenshot.

Sturmwind is a scrolling shoot 'em up game set in a futuristic science fiction setting. Prior to starting, an options menu can be accessed at the game's title screen, where any of the three available difficulty settings can be selected. There are also two game modes to choose: "Normal" and "Arcade". Normal mode has 16 levels and allows the player select any stage reached during a playthrough to resume progress, while Arcade mode only has 6 stages but continues are not allowed. The player takes control of a space fighter craft over a constantly scrolling background, populated with an assortment of enemy forces and obstacles, and the scenery never stops moving until a boss is reached, which must be fought in order to progress further. The game primarily scrolls horizontally, but there are also sections where the scrolling is vertical, and uses various visual effects such as pre-rendered sprites and backgrounds with 3D elements.

The weapon system is reminiscent of Thunder Force and Axelay; There are three types of weapon units in the game the player's ship can acquire by collecting their respective colors via containers dropped by certain enemies when defeated and alternate between each one at any given time during gameplay, ranging from Lichtblitz (blue), Nordwest (red) and Rudel (green). The weapon containers start as bonus points, and shooting them cycles through the three weapon types instead. Collecting the same weapon type upgrades the player's ship with one of two satellite-like options that add firepower. These options can also be switched between back and forth positions by pressing the left shoulder trigger, as well as block incoming enemy shots.

Each selectable weapon in Sturmwind also operate like shields; The game eschews the standard one-hit-kill model prevalent in space shooters, instead simply disabling the currently selected weapon and reducing the player to a weak default version of that weapon type when hit by an enemy. Sustaining a second hit while using the ship's last available weapon will destroy the player's ship. However, directly colliding into an enemy or an obstacle only disables the selected weapon instead of destroying the ship instantly. Every weapon can be charged for a more powerful attack, but they can also become disabled when overheated.

The scoring system is determined by enemy waves; After defeating an enemy wave, the words "Wave Bonus" appear on screen and shooting every letter before they disappear rewards the player with a star, acting as a score multiplier. Various other items can also be picked up along the way such as 1Ups, smart bombs capable of obliterating any enemy caught within its blast radius and bonus points. Collecting these bonus points are also crucial to reach high scores. By completing certain objectives during gameplay, the player can obtain trophies to unlock additional in-game content. Sturmwind employs a respawn system where the player's ship immediately starts at the location they died at. The game is over once all lives are lost. The player is given a unique code to input their scores via an online leaderboard at the game's official website.

== Development ==
Gameplay screenshot from the demo of Native for the Atari Jaguar and Jaguar CD.

Sturmwind began development in 1997. The game first surfaced under the name Native, an Atari Jaguar CD demo featuring just one playable level. The graphics were regarded as impressive for Jaguar standards, but the demo had no audio. Development was eventually resumed and shifted for Dreamcast.

== Release ==
Sturmwind was first unveiled on December 5, 2010, on 3sat's television show neues, as part of RedSpotGames' upcoming plans of reporting news through each Sunday of the month. The game's reveal received coverage from gaming publications in the United States, Europe, and Japan for being on a discontinued console, with German online publication Chip calling its graphical effects as "very amazing" in relation to the Dreamcast's age. In March 2011, Sega of America member Fabian Döhla promoted the title by playing a work-in-progress build on Destructoid's online show Mash Tactics. It was also showcased at the 2011 Spanish gaming expo "RetroEncounter". In July 15, RedSpotGames announced that its original launch window was postponed to November 11, in response to feedback from the announcement trailer to revise the weapon system and increase the game's quality. On December 19, 2011, the company later announced that the game had been delayed indefinitely due to the disc pressing plant they had contracted to manufacture copies filed for bankruptcy, while a deal was made with a new pressing plant but the release date had then been set as 'TBA'.

During an official press release issued on March 14, 2013, RedSpotGames confirmed that Sturmwind would be launched on April 24 in both regular and limited editions. It is the first original game released for Dreamcast since 2009's Rush Rush Rally Racing and IRiDES: Master of Blocks, as other more recent releases have all been ports such as Fast Striker. Between 2016 and 2017, the title was re-released by Duranik, JoshProd and RushOnGame without the original RedSpotGames branding, after the publisher closed its doors. On September 30, 2019, a remastered version titled Sturmwind EX was released for Microsoft Windows via Steam by B-Alive Entertainment Software. The remastered version was later ported to Nintendo Switch and Xbox One by B-Alive Entertainment on November 8. In 2022, publisher Pix'n Love also made the Switch version available as a physical release in two editions; a regular edition and a collector's edition limited to 2000 units.

== Reception ==
Reception

Review scores
Publication	Score
4Players	(DC) 80%
IGN	(DC) 8.0/10
Jeuxvideo.com	(DC) 17/20
Retro Gamer	(DC) 88%
Chip Power Play	(DC) 80%
GamesTribune	(DC) 85/100
RetroManiac	(DC) 4/5
Video Chums	(XONE) 8.1/10

Sturmwind garnered critical acclaim from reviewers since its release on Dreamcast. RedSpotGames' CEO Max Scharl declared that the game gained nearly as many pre-orders as Last Hope. According to VentureBeat's Dan Crawley, both the regular and limited editions were sold out at the official websites of RedSpotGames and PlayAsia. Maximiliano Baldo of Argentinian website Malditos Nerds ranked the original Dreamcast version as number six on their top ten games for discontinued consoles.

Hardcore Gaming 101's Sam Derboo praised the pre-rendered pseudo-3D visuals, accessibility, weapon system, boss fights and techno music but criticized its prolonged length in Normal Mode. Jeuxvideo.com's Dominique Cavallo highly commended visual presentation compared to other homebrew releases on Dreamcast with its use of special graphical effects and background animations, stage and enemy variety, accessible gameplay and unlockable secrets but criticized the uninspired soundtrack and redability of patterns. IGN Italia's Vincenzo Ercole gave high remarks to the presentation reminiscent of Xbox Live Arcade and PlayStation Network titles, backgrounds, gameplay structure and longevity but criticized the visibility of stage and boss elements on-screen, as well as sound design. Carlos Oliveiros of Spanish magazine GamesTribune highlighted its design, technical quality, amount of gameplay content and techno soundtrack but criticized the occasional difficulty to distinguish harmful objects on-screen.

4Players's Michael Krosta regarded Sturmwind as a throwback to titles like R-Type and X-Out, praising the varied backgrounds, weapon system, challenging bosses and level design but criticized its technical performance. Retro Gamer's Darran Jones praised the gameplay mechanics, detailed graphics, imaginative boss encounters and its avoidance of European shoot 'em up tropes but noted that the Euro-style soundtrack does not match the gameplay and occasional difficulty to distinguish stage hazards on-screen. David Borrachero of Spanish magazine RetroManiac commended its Axelay-esque weapon system, use of pre-rendered and polygon graphics, responsive controls, numerous secrets and gameplay content but criticized the sound design.

A reviewer of German publication Chip Power Play stated that it was "simply impressive what Duranik conjures up out of a 15-year-old console", giving high remarks to the backdrops and balanced difficulty. Mark Bussler of Classic Game Room praised the game's music, level design and presentation, eventually naming it the "2013 Game of the Year". Reviewing the Xbox One version of Sturmwind EX, Video Chums' A.J. Maciejewski commented in a positive light about the weapon and scoring systems, detailed visuals, energetic music and length but criticized the generic sound effects, lack of multiplayer mode and online leaderboards, as well as the difficulty to distinguish hazards and obstacles.
