= Xeno Crisis =

2019 video game

- Developer: Bitmap Bureau (Note: Ported to Nintendo Switch, PlayStation 4, and Xbox One by DO Games)
- Publisher: Bitmap Bureau (Note: Nintendo Switch, PlayStation 4, and PlayStation Vita versions published in Japan by Eastasiasoft)
- Directors: Matthew Cope; Mike Tucker
- Programmers: Matthew Cope; Mike Tucker
- Artists: Henk Nieborg; Catherine Menabde
- Composer: Daniel Bärlin
- Platforms: Sega Mega Drive/Genesis, Linux, macOS, Microsoft Windows, Nintendo Switch, PlayStation 4, PlayStation 5, Xbox One, Dreamcast, PlayStation Vita, Neo Geo, Neo Geo CD, Nintendo 64, GameCube, Super Nintendo Entertainment System, Game Boy Advance, PlayStation, Evercade
- Release: October 28, 2019: Mega Drive/Genesis, PC; WW: October 28, 2019 NS, PS4; WW: October 28, 2019; JP: September 17, 2020 Xbox One; WW: October 30, 2019 Dreamcast; WW: June 16, 2020 PS Vita; JP: September 17, 2020; NA: September 22, 2020 Neo Geo, Neo Geo CD; WW: October 2021 N64, GameCube; WW: April 2023 SNES; WW: April 2024 GBA; WW: November 8, 2024 PlayStation; WW: TBA
- Genre: Multidirectional shooter
- Modes: Single-player, multiplayer

Xeno Crisis is a 2019 multidirectional shooter video game developed and published by Bitmap Bureau. It is well known for its homebrew releases on a plethora of retro consoles, in addition to official releases on personal computers and current home consoles. The premise takes place in Outpost 88, a scientific research facility overrun by aliens. The facility sent a distress signal, leading Commander Darius dispatching space marines John Marsh and Sarah Ridley to confront the aliens. Gameplay revolves around players defeating enemies, rescuing survivors, collecting in-game currency for upgrades, and facing against bosses.

Critical reception for Xeno Crisis has varied depending on the version; the Mega Drive/Genesis release garnered generally favorable reviews, while the Switch port received average reviews. Praise was given to its graphical presentation, soundtrack, arcade-style gameplay, controls, and cooperative multiplayer, but some reviewers felt mixed regarding the bosses and certain design decisions. Criticism was geared towards its difficulty, short length, and issues when playing with the Mega Drive's three-button controller.

== Gameplay ==
Gameplay screenshot (Sega Mega Drive/Genesis version shown)

Xeno Crisis is a multidirectional shooter game similar to Robotron: 2084 and Smash TV. The premise begins with Commander Darius receiving a distress signal from Outpost 88, a scientific research facility overrun by aliens. The space marines John Marsh and Sarah Ridley are dispatched on a drop ship to confront the aliens at the facility. One or two players control either Marsh or Ridley, and work their way through seven procedurally generated levels. There are a number of enemies of various difficulty in each room, concluding with a boss battle at the end of most levels. After enemies onscreen are killed, a chance of an item, a weapon drop, health, or dogtags are dropped to aid the player. Dogtags are used as in-game currency to buy upgrades such as additional health or increase the player character's speed. The starting machine gun has limited ammunition, and weapon pickups have a time limit, requiring players to stay on the move and on the lookout for ammunition boxes. Along the way, players will come across with survivors of the facility that can be rescued and released to safety.

The game employs a twin-stick control scheme, which allows for an eight-way input direction; the d-pad or left joystick controls the on-screen character's movement, while the buttons or right joystick controls the direction the character's weapon fires. The player character is equipped with a limited supply of grenades, capable of obliterating any enemy caught within its blast radius. If a player character runs out of bullets and grenades, they can perform a close-range melee attack against enemies. The player character can also perform an evasive roll maneuver to dodge enemies and enemy fire. There are over ten weapon pickups, each with their own characteristics, ranging from flamethrowers, homing shots, lasers, rocket launchers, and shotguns. The characters can withstand a limited number of enemy hits but the game is over once their health are depleted, though players have the option to continue playing using elixirs that can also be purchased. The player can access the game's options screen to change configurations such as controls, difficulty, among other settings.

== Development ==
Xeno Crisis was developed by Bitmap Bureau.

== Release ==
Xeno Crisis was launched by Bitmap Bureau via Kickstarter in December 2017, and met its initial £18,261 ($20,000) funding goal days later. The game was initially in development for Sega Mega Drive/Genesis, but ports for Dreamcast, Linux, macOS, Microsoft Windows, and Nintendo Switch were confirmed after the funding reached previously established stretch goals. The campaign ended on January 10, 2018, raising £72,569 ($92,271) in total. It was first slated for October 2018, coinciding with the 30th anniversary of the Mega Drive's Japanese launch, but Bitmap Bureau later announced that the game would not be ready by 2018, due to production slowing down. Ports for Neo Geo, PlayStation 4, and Xbox One were later confirmed. Physical copies for Switch and PlayStation 4 were confirmed in partnertship with Strictly Limited Games. In December 2018, pre-orders for digital and physical editions of the Mega Drive, Dreamcast, and Neo Geo versions opened up. The Neo Geo port was available in MVS (arcade), AES (home), and CD (Neo Geo CD) formats.

Xeno Crisis was published by Bitmap Bureau for the Mega Drive, Linux, macOS, Windows, Switch, and PlayStation 4 on October 28, 2019. The Xbox One port was published two days later. The Switch, PlayStation 4, and Xbox One ports were handled by DO Games. Strictly Limited Games later opened up pre-orders for physical copies of the Switch and PlayStation 4 ports as two editions: a regular edition and a collector's edition, featuring an artbook, a CD album containing the original soundtrack, among other extras. The Dreamcast port went gold and was published on June 16, 2020, featuring additional content including a narrated introductory sequence and support for the VMU. Eastasiasoft published PlayStation Vita port, and opened up pre-orders via online retailer Play-Asia. The Vita port was first published in Japan on September 17, 2020, and later in North America on September 22, as a limited edition of 2000 copies. Eastasiasoft also distributed the Switch and PlayStation 4 ports in Japan.

The Mega Drive version was included as part of the Xeno Crisis & Tanglewood compilation for Evercade, released by Blaze Entertainment on November 6, 2020. The Neo Geo and Neo Geo CD versions were completed and published in October 2021, but their retail price was increased due to the global chip shortage as a result of the COVID-19 pandemic. Xeno Crisis became available via Xbox Game Pass on August 6, 2020 for PC and Xbox consoles, but was later delisted in January 2022. On April Fools' Day 2023, Nintendo 64 and GameCube ports were confirmed and published that same month. The GameCube port requires a modded system in order to boot the disc. A Super Nintendo Entertainment System port was later unveiled and released in April 2024. A Game Boy Advance port is set for release in November 2024, with a PlayStation port nearing completion as well.

== Reception ==
Reception

Aggregate score
Aggregator	Score
Metacritic	(NS) 74/100

Review scores
Publication	Score
4Players	70/100
M! Games	(NS) 82/100
Nintendo Life	(NS) 8/10
Retro Gamer	(SMD) 87% (N64) 85%
Vandal	8/10
Wireframe	(SMD) 81%

Xeno Crisis on Nintendo Switch garnered "mixed or average" reviews, according to review aggregator site Metacritic. Nintendo Life's Jason Brown reviewed the Switch port, praising the game's design, fast-paced gameplay, and cooperative mode, but criticized its difficulty for being off-putting for inexperienced players. Vandal's Ramón Nafria praised the game's graphical presentation, audio, and two-player mode, but noted that it can be difficult for one player. 4Players' Matthias Schmid highlighted the game's visuals, controls, soundscape, challenge, and rudimentary character leveling system. Nevertheless, Schmid saw aspects such as the "down-to-earth" playability, scope, and bosses as shortcomings. Sega-16's Ken Horowitz gave the Sega Mega Drive/Genesis version positive remarks for its engrossing arcade-style gameplay, artwork by Henk Nieborg, and soundtrack by Daniel Bärlin (Savaged Regime), but noted its difficulty and faulted its short length.

M! Games' Thomas Nickel reviewed the Switch port, commending the game's frenetic action, large bosses, difficulty, controls, multiplayer, and pixel art. Retro Gamer's Darran Jones regarded it as one of the best arena shooters on the Mega Drive, highlighting its "ridiculous" action, co-op play, and bosses, but noted its difficulty and issues when playing with the Mega Drive's three-button controller. Jones also called the Nintendo 64 version "superb", comparing it favorably with the Dreamcast version, but felt that an option for customizable controls would have been a nice addition. Reviewing the Mega Drive version, Wireframe's Ryan Lambie praised the game's polish and gameplay, but criticized some design decisions like the weapon upgrades and the melee attack feature. Hardcore Gamer's Marcus Estrada analyzed the Mega Drive version as part of the Xeno Crisis & Tanglewood compilation for Evercade, stating that the difficulty and random-generated stages made it a replayable title.
