= Gunlord =

2012 video game

- Developer: NG:Dev.Team
- Publisher: NG:Dev.Team
- Designer: René Hellwig
- Programmer: Timm Hellwig
- Artists: Andrew Bado; Henk Nieborg; Konstantin Karpenyuk; Perry Sessions
- Composer: Rafael Dyll
- Platforms: Dreamcast, Neo Geo, Nintendo Switch, PlayStation 4
- Release: WW: 26 March 2012
- Genre: Run and gun
- Mode: Single-player
- Arcade system: Neo Geo MVS

Gunlord is a 2012 single-player run and gun video game developed and published by German indie NG:Dev.Team for the Neo Geo MVS. It is the first run and gun title from NG:Dev.Team and their third game overall. Taking place after the events of Last Hope, the player assume the role of Gordian Gaiden facing against an evil lord called "The Master" on planet Kairos II while searching for his wife Vanessa, who went missing after defeating the evil empire. Inspired by 16-bit titles such as Turrican, the game originally started development in 2003 but was postponed for various years until the project was resumed in 2010, lasting eighteen months in production.

Gunlord garnered positive reception from critics since its release; praise was given to the audiovisual presentation and exploration-based gameplay but criticism was geared towards several aspects such as the expansive level design, difficulty and technical issues on the Dreamcast version. An updated version with new content titled Gunlord X was released in 2019 for Nintendo Switch and PlayStation 4.

== Gameplay ==
Neo Geo version screenshot

Gunlord is a run and gun game reminiscent of Turrican where players assume the role of Gordian Gaiden across nine non-linear stages set in the planet Kairos II. Its plot takes place after the events of Last Hope, where the evil empire was destroyed by pilot Vanessa Gaiden and although she escaped, her victory was short-lived as she never made it home and was declared missing in action. Meanwhile, a new evil appeared and began to terrorize the galaxy, a planet lord called "The Master" that can create beings of steel and enslave humans by absorbing their souls. Gordian, Vanessa's newlywed husband, is out to search for her when he feels the presence of evil and dons his Gunlord suit.

During gameplay, the player must explore each large and branching stage using abilities such as a morph-ball function like Metroid to find new weapons, of which there are seven weapon types in total, crystals for points and power-up items to upgrade each weapon while fighting against enemies and bosses. In addition to the main platforming segments, there is also a shoot 'em up segment similar to R-Type. The title includes two game modes; arcade and original. The Dreamcast version features VMU support for saving progress.

== Development ==
Gunlord was developed over the course of eighteenth months by NG:Dev.Team, serving as their first run-and-gun title and their third game overall. Its development was helmed by a crew of seven members, four of which were artists, with René and Timm Hellwig acting as designer and programmer respectively. Former WayForward and Thalion Software members Andrew "DarkFalzX" Bado and Henk Nieborg, as well as Konstantin Karpenyuk and Neo XYX designer Perry "Gryzor/Rozyrg" Sessions, were responsible for the pixel art. The music was scored by Last Hope composer Rafael Dyll, who was contracted earlier during development. Its existence was first hinted upon by René during a joint interview with various Dreamcast fan sites in September 2010 and most of the staff recounted the project's development process and history through various interviews.

René stated that development of Gunlord began in 2003 but was paused for several years so the team could work on other projects until production resumed in 2010. René also stated that the project was inspired by their favorite 16-bit games such as Turrican, Metroid and Contra but production and cartridge manufacturing for the game was expensive, as he claimed that an "initial five-figure investment was necessary" and NG:Dev.Team invested the entire revenue obtained from sales of Fast Striker into the game. Timm stated that the title was written for Neo Geo in C and Assembler languages, using a reverse engineered Neo Geo system and their own development kit. Perry Sessions said that his role was to fill remaining contents of the project, creating cutscenes alongside Timm and completing the horizontal-scrolling shooter segment. Sessions also drew and animated new enemies and an Alien-influenced boss, which was later animated by another artist. When composing the soundtrack, Rafael Dyll said that the work of Chris Huelsbeck was an influence and aimed to emulate the atmosphere of Turrican while creating "something new".

== Release ==
Gunlord was first announced in late 2011 for Neo Geo and Dreamcast. Neo Geo MVS version was originally slated for a December 2011 launch but was quietly delayed until it was published on 26 March 2012. The Dreamcast version was published on 21 June 2012 in a Japanese-style DVD packaging as three editions; a regular edition, a limited edition featuring an alternate cover art and a soundtrack enclosed with the game, as well as a collector "Dragon Box" edition containing both releases. The Neo Geo AES version was released on 25 April 2013, complete with packaging mimicking officially licensed Neo Geo releases. In May 2017, a second run of the AES version was made available on the official page of NG:Dev.Team.

In 2013, NG:Dev.Team became an authorized Nintendo developer and the company launched an Indiegogo campaign to raise funds to bring Gunlord to the Nintendo 3DS and Wii U via the Nintendo eShop as well as PC in September of the same year but despite the fundraiser receiving press across publications such as Destructoid and Joystiq, the project was cancelled within the same month and proved unsuccessful in reaching its funding goal of €40,000. The game was also slated to be in development for the Coleco Chameleon before the console was cancelled. An updated version titled Gunlord X was first released by NG:Dev.Team for Nintendo Switch on 22 May 2019 and later in Japan on 12 December of the same year, featuring extended stages and new bosses not found in the original versions, among other additions. The Switch version was also published by NG:Dev.Team in a physical format as two releases; a regular release and a collector release limited to 999 copies. Gunlord X was later ported to PlayStation 4 on December 10 of the same year.

== Reception ==
Reception

Aggregate score
Aggregator	Score
Metacritic	(NS) 79/100

Review scores
Publication	Score
Eurogamer	(DC) 8/10
Famitsu	(NS) 28/40
GamesTM	(DC) 5/10
Jeuxvideo.com	(DC) 14/20
M! Games	(NS) 83/100
Nintendo Life	(NS) 8/10
Retro Gamer	(DC) 69%
Metro	(DC) 8/10
RetroManiac	(NG) 4/5
The Games Machine	(NS) 8.4/10

Gunlord and its update, Gunlord X, were met with positive reception from critics since their release. Classic Game Room's Mark Bussler called the game "unbelievably good" and "an obvious 2012 game of the year contender", before achieving the feat on 13 December of the same year. The A.V. Club's Anthony John Agnello ranked the original Neo Geo version as number two on their top ten of games released for discontinued consoles. According to Hardcore Gamers, 10,000 copies of the Dreamcast release were sold as of May 2019. According to review aggregator site Metacritic, the Nintendo Switch version of Gunlord X received "generally favorable" reviews.

Eurogamer's Simon Parkin praised its '90s-style visual presentation, gameplay and balance but criticized various technical issues in the Dreamcast version. Jeuxvideo.com's Dominique Cavallo commended NG:Dev.Team for creating a Turrican-like experience, praising the arcade-like presentation, Mega Drive-like graphics, fast gameplay, large stages and audio design. When reviewing Gunlord X on Switch, Thomas Nickel of MAN!AC gave positive remarks to the atmospheric pixel art, action, balanced difficulty, secrets and soundtrack but criticized the level design for being long and branched. Nintendo Life's Ollie Reynolds also reviewed the Switch version of Gunlord X, commenting in a positive about the exploration-based gameplay, combat, expansive stages design and overall audiovisual presentation. Reviewing the Dreamcast version, Metro's Roger Hargreaves regarded the game as a "love letter" to Turrican and European 16-bit action games of the '90s, commending the Roger Dean-style visuals reminiscent of Psygnosis titles, boss encounters, level design and presentation but criticized the lack of new ideas and high difficulty.

In contrast to other critics, Retro Gamer's Darran Jones and Stuart Hunt reviewed the Dreamcast version and gave positive remarks to the audiovisual presentation, atmosphere, large stages and hidden secrets that encourages exploration but criticized the controls for being clunky, technical issues, weapon design and gameplay. RetroManiac Magazine's David Borrachero reviewed the original Neo Geo release, commenting in a positive light about the graphics reminiscent of Shadow of the Beast, modes of play, gameplay and music. The Games Machine's Danilo Dellafrana reviewed the Switch release of Gunlord X, giving positive remarks for being a successful conversion of the original Neo Geo version, Dyll's soundtrack, the "old school" audiovisual presentation and balanced difficulty but criticized the autosave feature for lowering its challenge level and short length.
