= NGDEV =

German video game company

- Industry: Video games
- Founded: 2001; 25 years ago
- Founders: Timm and René Hellwig
- Headquarters: Germany
- Products: Video games
- Website: ngdevteam.com

NGDEV, formerly NG:Dev.Team, is a German video game developer and publisher. Founded in 2001 by brothers Timm and René Hellwig, it is known for developing 2D homebrew games with arcade gameplay for the Neo Geo and Dreamcast.

== History ==
German brothers Timm and René Hellwig began developing doujin video games in 2000. Being fans of the Neo Geo, they started reverse engineering the hardware and were able to start developing prototypes. They founded NG:Dev.Team in 2001. In 2006, NG:Dev.Team released their first game, Last Hope. Only 60 copies were produced for the Neo Geo. Realizing an opportunity for greater commercial success, they signed with homebrew publisher RedSpotGames in 2007 to release copies for the Dreamcast. Surprised by the success of the Dreamcast version, the Hellwigs turned their game development hobby into full-time work, and began development on their next game Fast Striker. NG:Dev.Team use KallistiOS to develop Dreamcast games, an open source development environment for making Dreamcast homebrew. While the cost of producing Neo Geo carts is expensive and the community is small, the team considers this when planning their business.

In 2011, Timm Hellwig claimed roadblocks with publishing on modern consoles, saying it requires publisher and hardware manufacturer approval, while that is not necessary for publishing on old consoles. He also claimed the market for homebrew on retro consoles was declining, noting that sales of Fast Striker only totaled to 60% of Last Hope before it. In an effort to compromise, they expanded to more active platforms like the Wii and iPhone. Max Scharl of RedSpotGames disagreed with Timm's assessment, saying NG:Dev.Team does not promote their games well, and cited the commercial success of his Dreamcast game Sturmwind as further evidence. In 2012, Timm stated that Fast Striker was not successful on the iOS marketplace and blamed its niche appeal. He also claimed that retro-style games on Xbox and PlayStation marketplaces were only popular if they had a "hipster feel" which their team was not interested in exploring. In 2019, the company rebranded themselves from NG:Dev.Team to NGDEV.

== Games ==
Year	Title	Original platform(s)	Publisher	Ref.
2006	Last Hope	Dreamcast, Neo Geo, Neo Geo CD	NG:Dev.Team, RedSpotGames	
2009	Last Hope: Pink Bullets	Dreamcast, Neo Geo	NG:Dev.Team	
2010	Fast Striker	Dreamcast, iOS, Neo Geo, PlayStation 4, PlayStation Vita	NG:Dev.Team, Eastasiasoft	
2012	Gunlord	Dreamcast, Neo Geo	NG:Dev.Team	
2013	Neo XYX	Dreamcast, Neo Geo	NG:Dev.Team	
2014	Razion	Neo Geo	NG:Dev.Team	
2019	Kraut Buster	Neo Geo	NGDEV	
2019	Gunlord X	Nintendo Switch, PlayStation 4	Eastasiasoft	
2021	Razion EX	Nintendo Switch	NGDEV	
2022	Gunvein	Microsoft Windows, Nintendo Switch, PlayStation 4, Xbox One	NGDEV	
