= Rainbow Moon =

2012 video game

- Developer: SideQuest Studios
- Publisher: Eastasiasoft
- Composer: Rafael Dyll
- Platforms: PlayStation 3, PlayStation Vita, PlayStation 4, Nintendo Switch
- Release: July 10, 2012: PlayStation 3; NA: July 10, 2012; EU/AU: September 5, 2012; JP: April 3, 2014; PlayStation Vita; NA: December 3, 2013; EU/AU: December 4, 2013; JP: April 3, 2014; PlayStation 4; NA: February 16, 2016; EU/AU: February 17, 2016; JP: June 30, 2016; Nintendo Switch; WW: March 15, 2024
- Genre: Tactical role-playing
- Mode: Single-player

Rainbow Moon is a tactical role-playing game developed by SideQuest Studios and published by Eastasiasoft. It was released through the PlayStation Network for PlayStation 3, PlayStation Vita and PlayStation 4. The game borrows heavily from the dungeon crawling genre while the player traverses the game world, but incorporates elements from tactical role-playing games when enemies are engaged in battle.

A successor titled Rainbow Skies was released in June 2018 for PlayStation 3, PlayStation 4, and PS Vita.

Originally a digital-only title, a limited physical run of the PlayStation 4 and PlayStation Vita versions was released on August 19, 2016 through Limited Run Games.

On March 15, 2024, Rainbow Moon was released on the Nintendo Switch.

== Reception ==
Reception

Aggregate score
Aggregator	Score		
Aggregator	PS Vita	PS3	PS4
Metacritic	70/100	70/100	70/100

Review scores
Publication	Score		
Publication	PS Vita	PS3	PS4
Destructoid		6/10	
Eurogamer		7/10	
GameSpot		6/10	
GamesRadar+		2.5/5	
IGN	8.0/10	8.0/10	
Joystiq		3/5	

Upon release, Rainbow Moon received generally positive reviews. Praise was directed toward the complete feel of the game's mechanics, length of the main storyline and the graphics, while complaints centered on content that reviewers felt forced the player to grind.
