= FreeShop =

Defunct piracy software for the Nintendo 3DS

freeShop
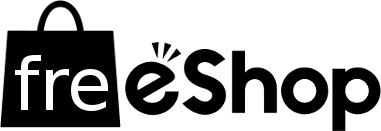
- Original author: Thomas Edvalson (TheCruel)
- Release: May 28, 2016; 10 years ago
- Final release: 5.0.1 / December 17, 2025; 11 months ago
- Written in: C++
- Platform: 3DS
- Type: Piracy, homebrew
- License: MIT
- Website: freeshop.pw (archived 2017)
- Repository: notabug.org/evi/freeShop

freeShop was a homebrew application for the Nintendo 3DS that allowed games to be downloaded from the Nintendo eShop's servers without being previously purchased. freeShop was first released in April 2016, before being removed from GitHub following a DMCA takedown notice sent in late December 2016.

== History ==
freeShop was created by Thomas Edvalson, known online as TheCruel, in 2016. freeShop used a user-submitted database of "tickets" to decrypt games downloaded from Nintendo's servers, which were available without any authentication.

The software was taken down from GitHub after Nintendo sent a DMCA takedown notice requesting its removal on December 27, 2016, claiming that "the freeShop application provided at https://github.com/Cruel/freeShop/releases infringes Nintendo's copyrights, because the application circumvents Nintendo's technological protection measures in violation of the Digital Millennium Copyright Act."

Following its removal from GitHub, freeShop was distributed via other means, and piracy of 3DS games directly from Nintendo's servers continued. In 2018, Nintendo began requiring authentication for downloads of 3DS games, making freeShop and similar tools non-functional.
