= Neo XYX =

2013 video game

- Developer: NG:Dev.Team
- Publisher: NG:Dev.Team
- Designers: Perry Sessions; Timm Hellwig
- Composer: Rafael Dyll
- Platforms: Dreamcast, Neo Geo
- Release: WW: October 28, 2013
- Genre: Vertically scrolling shooter
- Mode: Single-player
- Arcade system: Neo Geo MVS

Neo XYX is a 2013 single-player vertically scrolling shooter video game originally developed and published by German indie NG:Dev.Team for the Neo Geo MVS. It is the third shoot 'em up title from NG:Dev.Team and their fifth game overall. Controlling a space fighter craft, the player must fight endless waves of enemies while avoiding collision with their projectiles and other obstacles.

Developed in conjunction with Redux: Dark Matters and The Ghost Blade, Neo XYX originated as a GameMaker prototype inspired by Toaplan shoot 'em ups titled XYX that was distributed for PC in 2012 by designer Perry "Gryzor/Rozyrg" Sessions, who had previously helped with development of Gunlord before NG:Dev.Team became involved after the project caught their interest and worked alongside Sessions, suggesting him to refine aspects of his project into a Neo Geo game. The title was later ported to Dreamcast and Neo Geo AES, each one featuring minimal changes and additions compared to the original version.

Neo XYX was met with positive reception from critics. Reviewers drew comparison with Toaplan and Cave shooters, praising its fast-paced action, hand-drawn visuals, soundtrack, gameplay and difficulty but others criticized the lack of innovation compared to other games in the same genre and lack of two-player mode, as well as the lack of additional options on the Dreamcast version, among other aspects. A follow-up, titled Super XYX, was developed by Team Grybanser Fox and released in 2020 for PC on Steam.

== Gameplay ==
Neo Geo version screenshot

Neo XYX is a science fiction-themed vertically scrolling shoot 'em up game reminiscent of Toaplan and Cave shooters such as Batsugun and DoDonPachi respectively, in which the player take control of a space fighter craft through six increasingly difficult stages in order to defeat an assortment of enemy forces and bosses. Before starting a game in the Neo Geo version, the player have the option to change the display and control settings between vertical (TATE) and horizontal (YOKO), while two additional display settings are introduced in the Dreamcast version. Its gameplay uses a main three-button configuration.

During gameplay, power-up items are drop randomly from enemies and certain setpieces, along with medals to build up a chain. Every time the player collects a medal, the next one that spawns will be worth more but if a medal falls off the screen, the next one to spawn will be of the lowest value and breaking the chain, but the player can activate a bomb to fling falling medals from reaching the bottom of the screen. The player has only two weapons at their disposal: the main gun that travels a max distance of the screen's height and a bomb capable of obliterating any enemy caught within its blast radius, while more bombs are obtained by collecting six fragments through levels or a full bomb stock. The player can also slowdown the ship's movement to avoid incoming bullets more precisely by pressing the C or R button in the Neo Geo and Dreamcast versions respectively. If both fire and slowdown buttons are held down, the ship produces a focused vertical shot, providing more firepower than the standard shot. Getting hit by enemy fire will result in losing a life, as well as a penalty of decreasing the ship's firepower and once all lives are lost, the game is over unless the player inserts more credits into the arcade machine to continue playing but in the Dreamcast version, the player are forced to restart from the beginning after losing all available continues.

== Development ==
Screenshot from XYX. Neo XYX originated as a GameMaker prototype on PC created solely by art designer Perry "Gryzor/Rozyrg" Sessions before NG:Dev.Team became interested and worked together with Sessions to refine his project into a Neo Geo game.

Neo XYX was developed in conjunction with Redux: Dark Matters and The Ghost Blade using a Neo Geo development kit, serving as the third shoot 'em up title from NG:Dev.Team and their fifth game overall. Timm Hellwig helmed its production, serving as both producer and director, as well as its sole programmer. Designer Perry "Gryzor/Rozyrg" Sessions, who had previously helped with development of Gunlord at NG:Dev.Team with René Hellwig, acted as art director and graphic artist. Rafael Dyll and a member under the pseudonym "Raigon" co-composed the soundtrack. Two other members, "Plasmo" and "Runefaust", collaborated in its development phase as beta testers. Both Sessions and Dyll recounted the project's development process and history through various publications.

Neo XYX originated as a GameMaker prototype for PC titled XYX created by Perry Sessions before NG:Dev.Team became involved after the project caught their attention and started working together in early 2013, suggesting Sessions to refine various aspects of his work into a Neo Geo game. Sessions stated that his main influences were Toaplan shoot 'em ups such as Twin Cobra, Truxton and Fire Shark, as well as other games in the genre like Super Star Soldier, Gate of Thunder, Soldier Blade, and Lords of Thunder, all of which he regards as his favorites. He was also inspired by other titles such as those by Llamasoft. Sessions also stated that work on the project took longer than expected and proved difficult, as creating level artwork was a "weak spot" for him but regards it as some of his best for any project he worked on.

When asked about the differences between the game and the original XYX, Sessions stated that they came from him and NG:Dev.Team working separately, as he did not have any means to playtest the project on his part while Timm had a "final say on everything"; Timm did not like the mixture of science fiction and fantasy elements, requesting to change elements such as dragons that later became cyborgs, while the team also lowered the planned number of playable ships. Sessions also claimed he had no saying over difficulty balancing issues, as the original XYX was used as a basis for most enemies. When composing the soundtrack for Neo XYX, Rafael Dyll stated that NG:Dev.Team wanted him produce music that were short and looped without noticeable breaks, creating something fresh but based on retro sounds, using instruments akin to arcade games from late 1980s or 16-bit consoles such as Sega Mega Drive.

== Release ==
Neo XYX was first announced in late 2012 for Neo Geo as a limited run and Dreamcast but prior to the announcement, a demo of the original XYX containing an unfinished level editor for Windows was made available as freeware at Sessions' personal website earlier on April of the same year. The game was first slated for an April 2013 launch on Neo Geo and a June 2013 launch on Dreamcast, but was quietly delayed until it was published on October 28 of the same year for Neo Geo MVS. Around the same time period, a music album was released by NG:Dev.Team and a digital album was later distributed by Rafael Dyll through Bandcamp in October 2014. In July 2014, a Neo Geo AES version was also released by NG:Dev.Team.

The Dreamcast version of Neo XYX was then slated for a holiday 2013 launch but remained in development due to internal issues until it went gold in January 2014. The Dreamcast version was published the following month on February 17, in a Japanese-style DVD packaging as three editions; a regular edition, a deluxe edition limited to 1000 copies featuring an alternate cover art and a soundtrack enclosed with the game, as well as a collector edition limited to 300 units containing both releases. This version has no regional protection but only works using Dreamcast units built prior to October 2001. A second run of the regular edition for Dreamcast was made available on the official page of NG:Dev.Team in March 2014.

== Reception and legacy ==
Reception

Review scores
Publication	Score
Destructoid	(DC) 8/10
Jeuxvideo.com	(DC) 15/20
Retro Gamer	(DC) 80%
neXGam	(DC) 8.2/10
RetroManiac	(NG/DC) 3/5

Neo XYX was met with positive reception from critics. According to Hardcore Gamers, all editions of the first Dreamcast release were sold out as of February 2014. Maximiliano Baldo of Argentinian website Malditos Nerds ranked the game as number eight on their top ten of games released for discontinued consoles. Destructoid's Chris Carter praised its complexity, boss fights, game modes, hand-drawn artwork and soundtrack by Rafael Dyll. Jeuxvideo.com's Dominique Cavallo commended the fast-paced action, learning curve, display options and graphical effects but criticized its lack of innovation, short length and omission of a multiplayer mode.

Heiko Poppen of German website neXGam commented in a positive light about the scoring system, varied and colorful graphical design of levels and bosses, Dyll's music and learning curve but criticized the Dreamcast version for being sparse with option settings, lack of two-player mode and other aspects. David Borrachero of Spanish magazine RetroManiac compared the game with shooters such as Truxton and Raiden, praising the Japanese-style aesthetic, performance, sound design, gameplay and controls but noted that its high difficulty level was not recommended for newcomers, the lack of a two-player mode and technical bugs. Retro Gamer's Darran Jones stated that the title captured the feel of Toaplan shoot 'em ups like Truxton, commending its colorful presentation, boss fights, scoring mechanic and intense gameplay but criticized certain technical issues present in the Dreamcast port.

A year after the launch of Neo XYX on the market, Perry Sessions and Jack "Kaiser" Darx began development of a follow-up at Team Grybanser Fox, titled Super XYX, once Sessions made an agreement with NG:Dev.Team. It was released on August 10, 2020, for PC on Steam.
