= Fast Striker =

2010 video game

- Developer: NG:Dev.Team
- Publisher: NG:Dev.Team
- Designers: René Hellwig; Timm Hellwig
- Artists: Antone Pires; Steven Wen
- Composers: Christian Werdehausen; Ronny Leuendorf
- Platforms: Dreamcast, iOS, Neo Geo, PlayStation 4, PlayStation Vita
- Release: WW: June 30, 2010
- Genre: Scrolling shooter
- Mode: Single-player
- Arcade system: Neo Geo MVS

Fast Striker is a vertically scrolling shooter developed and published by German developer NG:Dev.Team in 2010 for the Neo Geo MVS. The player flies a space fighter craft through levels to shoot waves of enemies. The game was ported to Dreamcast, iOS, Neo Geo AES, PlayStation 4, and PlayStation Vita.

Fast Striker was developed in conjunction with HUCAST's DUX over the course of six years after the Hellwig brothers founded NG:Dev.Team and development of their first video game, Last Hope, was completed. The team went with a different approach for their vertical-scrolling shooter project compared to the level memorization focus of Last Hope, emphasising fast-paced reflex action and an elaborate scoring system. The staff also received support from German shooter communities during beta testing, advising from Twinkle Star Sprites designer Yoshiyasu Matsushita and approval from SNK Playmore.

Fast Striker was met with mixed reception from critics. Reviewers praised its fast action, scoring system, techno soundtrack, speed, and adjustable difficulty levels that alters each playthrough but others criticized the gameplay, monochrome visual style, pacing and short length, as well as the lack of additional options on the PlayStation versions.

== Gameplay ==
Neo Geo version screenshot

Fast Striker is a science fiction-themed vertically scrolling shoot 'em up game in which the player take control of a space fighter craft through six increasingly difficult stages in order to defeat an assortment of enemy forces and bosses.

At the start, there are three difficulty modes to choose from (Novice, Original and Maniac), each one hosting unique scoring systems. In Novice mode, the enemies' color palette are altered to make them more visible and the player collects golden stars to gain points. In Original mode, the ship has a shield that can be activated for a brief protection time period against incoming enemy bullets and holding the down the spread fire button will also perform a short burst of rockets. Maniac mode introduces new strategies to obtain higher scores and the player can activate "Grind Mode" by concentrating the ship's laser on a large enemy, turning green and destroyed enemies will give high scores.

== Development ==
Fast Striker was developed by NG:Dev.Team in conjunction with HUCAST's DUX over the course of six years as their second project, after the brothers René and Timm Hellwig founded the company and development of Last Hope was completed, though René stated they considered game development as a hobby at the time. In various interviews, René stated that the team went with a different approach to the project, focusing on fast-paced reflex action and emphasis on an elaborate scoring system when compared Last Hope, which was more bulky and required players to memorize the level.

The team developed Fast Striker using a Neo Geo development kit and also took more time to test the game, with German shooter communities Triggerzone and Daddelking participating in the game's beta testing phase. Twinkle Star Sprites designer Yoshiyasu Matsushita also tested and liked the title, giving the team advices to improve the project. René claimed that the team also got quality approval from SNK Playmore for their project but did not get a license due to complications with reviving the Neo Geo platform. The title employs computer-generated imagery for stages, runs at 60 frames per second and displays up to 180 simultaneous enemy bullets on-screen. The music was co-composed by Christian Werdehausen and Ronny Leuendorf. Antone Pires and Steven Wen served as character artists. A two-player mode was planned but scrapped due to technical issues.

== Release ==
Fast Striker was first released by NG:Dev.Team for the Neo Geo MVS on June 30, 2010, while a limited edition included a soundtrack album. At 1560 megabits of data, it is one of the largest game developed for the Neo Geo platform. The MVS release supports software updates via a USB port and employs an anti-piracy system using proprietary hardware.

A Dreamcast version dubbed Fast Striker 1.5 featuring an "Omake" game mode was released in December 2010. It was released as a Japanese-style DVD packaging in three editions; a regular edition, a deluxe edition limited to 1000 copies featuring an alternate cover art and a soundtrack enclosed with the game, as well as a pack containing both editions. An iOS version based on the Dreamcast port was released in North America on March 27, 2011, and later in Europe on April 22 of the same year. In 2013, a Neo Geo AES version limited to 150-200 copies was also released.

In October 2018, Eastasiasoft published Fast Striker worldwide on PlayStation 4 and PlayStation Vita via PlayStation Network. Eastasiasoft also published a physical edition for both PS4 and PS Vita via Play-Asia in a special cardboard box with embossed art on the front.

== Reception ==
Reception

Aggregate score
Aggregator	Score
Metacritic	(PS4) 61/100

Review scores
Publication	Score
Jeuxvideo.com	(NG) 13/20
M! Games	(NG) 76/100
Push Square	(PS4) 5/10
Retro Gamer	(DC) 87%
GamesTribune	(DC) 70/100
Oprainfall	(PS4) 3/5
RetroManiac	(DC) 3/5
ReVival	(DC) 8/10

Fast Striker received "mixed or average" reviews, according to review aggregator site Metacritic, but according to NG:Dev.Team co-founder Timm Hellwig, sales of the game only totaled to 60% of Last Hope before it. ReVival's Cyril Denis called it an "excellent" shoot 'em up game. Carlos Oliveiros of Spanish magazine GamesTribune praised the art design, techno soundtrack, enemy variety and adjustable difficulty but criticized the Dreamcast conversion for being a straightforward adaptation of the Neo Geo MVS original, monocromatic stage visuals and lack of a two-player mode. Retro Gamer's Darran Jones and Stuart Hunt commended its fast-paced action, attack formations, bosses, intricate bullet patterns, music, mechanics and scoring system.

Jeuxvideo.com's Dominique Cavallo criticized the graphics for being unpleasant, techno soundtrack and overall length, but praised the scoring mechanics, gameplay and adjustable difficulty levels that alters each playthrough. MAN!AC's Matthias Schmid commended the Dreamcast version for running at a consistent framerate, the addition of "Omake" mode from revision 1.5, thought-out scoring system and soundtrack but criticized the visuals and stages for their monotonous colors and abundance of bullets during gameplay. Likewise, Spanish publication RetroManiac commended NG:Dev.Team for balancing their game to cater to a wider audience, praising the scoring system, visual presentation, speed and music, and called Fast Striker a pretty remarkable shooter.

Vida Extra's Oscar Bouzo criticized the PlayStation Vita conversion for its lack of additional options and "ugly" 3D stage design but commended the release for the bosses and gameplay differences each difficulty mode offers. In a similar manner, Push Square's Nathanial Eker criticized the PlayStation 4 port for its Neo Geo-style graphics for the "ugly" color palette, lack of extra options and basic gameplay, though he gave positive remarks to the soundtrack. Oprainfall's Nick Benefield gave the title a positive outlook on PS Vita, praising the upbeat music, bosses, visuals and gameplay but criticized the power-up system.
