= Rafael Dyll =

German composer, arranger and sound designer

- Occupation: Video game composer
- Notable work: Söldner-X soundtrack

Rafael Dyll is a German composer, arranger and sound designer for computer and video games.

Until 2006, he was mainly involved in retro-themed video game remix CDs and productions, such as Remix64 and Revival ST. His first commercial work was composing the music for the independent Neo Geo console game Last Hope, developed by NG:DEV.TEAM.

After receiving generally positive reviews for his compositions, he began working on several video game scores and set up his audio production service called soniQfactory. Featuring a wide array of electronic trance sounds, 8-Bit video game style samples, break beats and symphonic elements, his work has a distinct video game approach with by a growing fanbase.

Between 2009 and 2010, he has mainly worked on the PlayStation Network shmup series Söldner-X developed by SideQuest Studios, releasing a total of 4 soundtrack albums to accompany the 3 games in the series. In 2010, after receiving generally positive reviews from the video game press, he was nominated in the category `Best Contemporary/Alternative Score" for his work on Söldner-X 2: Final Prototype by SquareEnixMusic and gamemusic.net.

Since 2009, he has also been working as a sound effect designer on various titles and providing voice-over recording for game developers. Departing from his trademark electronic sound, he has composed the score for the SRPG fantasy game Rainbow Moon to be released on the PlayStation 3 and is also working on various iPhone/iOS projects and as yet unannounced games.

== Video Game References ==
Rafael Dyll has provided music, sound effects and/or voice over to the following games to date:

- Ghost Blade HD
- Rainbow Moon
- Neo XYX
- Gunlord
- The Last Chapter
- Fast Striker (Voice SFX engineering)
- Söldner-X 2: Final Prototype
- Last Hope: Pink Bullets
- Söldner-X: Himmelsstürmer
- Last Hope

== Discography ==
Rafael Dyll's CD/album discography:

- 2015: Ghost Blade Soundscape Collection
- 2013: NEO XYX Soundtrack
- 2012: Gunlord Soundtrack
- 2011: The Last Chapter Tracks
- 2010: Söldner-X 2: Final Soundtrack
- 2009: Söldner-X Complete Soundtrack
- 2009: Last Hope Complete Soundtrack
- 2008: Söldner-X Original Soundtrack
- 2006: Last Hope Soundtrack
- 2005: Revival ST
- 2003: Remix 64 Vol 2: Into Eternity
