= Söldner-X: Himmelsstürmer =

2007 video game

- Developer(s): SideQuest Studios
- Publisher(s): Eastasiasoft
- Composer(s): Rafael Dyll
- Platform(s): Microsoft Windows, PlayStation 3
- Release: Microsoft Windows: WW: December 14, 2007; PlayStation 3: NA: December 4, 2008; PAL: December 18, 2008
- Genre(s): Shoot 'em up
- Mode(s): Single-player, multiplayer

Söldner-X 2: Final Prototype
- Developer(s): SideQuest Studios
- Publisher(s): Eastasiasoft
- Composer(s): Rafael Dyll
- Platform(s): PlayStation 3, PlayStation Vita, PlayStation 4
- Release: PlayStation 3: NA: May 25, 2010; EU: May 26, 2010; PlayStation Vita: NA: March 17, 2015; PAL: March 18, 2015; NA: July 29, 2016 (retail); Definitive Edition; PlayStation 4: WW: November 4, 2020
- Genre(s): Shoot 'em up
- Mode(s): Single-player, multiplayer

Söldner-X: Himmelsstürmer is a 2007 scrolling shooter video game developed by German company SideQuest Studios and published by Eastasiasoft. The game was initially released physically for Microsoft Windows on December 14, 2007, before coming to the PlayStation 3 via the PlayStation Network in December 2008.

== Gameplay ==
Gameplay screenshot

Söldner-X is a traditional 2D shoot 'em up game with parallax scrolling, 720p high-definition graphics, weather effects and a rich weapon upgrade system.

== Reception ==
Reception

Aggregate score
Aggregator	Score
Metacritic	63%

Review score
Publication	Score
IGN	8/10

Review media aggregator website Metacritic scored the game at 63%, based on 11 reviews, indicating "Mixed or average reviews". Jeff Haynes of IGN awarded the game an 8.0 calling it "impressive".

== Sequel ==
A sequel titled Söldner-X 2: Final Prototype was released for the PlayStation 3 as a download-exclusive game in May 2010. The game features seven levels with a further three available as downloadable content. The sequel removes the weapon charging mechanic and limited ammo from the original game, resulting in a more traditional gameplay experience. It was also released in March 2015 for the PlayStation Vita. An enhanced version of the game for the PlayStation 4, titled Söldner-X 2: Final Prototype Definitive Edition was released in November 2020.
