= Playasia =

Online Retailer of Entertainment Products in Asia

Asia Entertainment Technology Ltd.
- Playasia's new logo after rebrand as of September 2018
- Type: Private
- Industry: Online Retailing, B2C
- Founded: 2002
- Headquarters: Lai Chi Kok
- Key people: Jan Neuhaeusser, CEO
- Products: DVDs, music, books, music books, DVD music books, electronics & gadgets, gaming consoles & accessories, video games, cables, toys and groceries
- Website: www.play-asia.com

Playasia is an online retailer of entertainment products from Asia. The website sells import games, DVDs, music, CDs, gadgets, groceries, books, gaming console accessories, cables and toys. Playasia is based in Hong Kong and caters to the Asia-Pacific region, but also offers most of the products to international buyers.

== History ==
Play-Asia.com was established in 2002 in Hong Kong, with the launch of its website selling games and accessories for all major current game consoles and computer operating systems. In addition to video games, the site also offers electronic goods, such as products from the Tamagotchi series.

The company announced its rebrand to Playasia and new logo in September 2018.

== Funding of game development ==
Playasia funded the development of side-scrolling shooter Söldner-X: Himmelsstürmer.

== Import suspension ==
Following the lawsuit against Lik-Sang over importing NTSC-J PlayStation 3 hardware and software to Europe, Play-Asia announced that it would no longer be shipping PlayStation 3 products to the EU.

== See also ==
- YesAsia
