= Last Hope (video game) =

2006 video game

- Developer: NG:Dev.Team
- Publishers: NG:Dev Team (Neo Geo); RedSpotGames (DC)
- Designers: Timm Hellwig; René Hellwig
- Composer: Rafael Dyll
- Platforms: Neo Geo, Neo Geo CD, Dreamcast
- Release: Neo Geo; July 10, 2006; Pink Bullets Neo Geo; February 21, 2011; Dreamcast; January 31, 2007; Pink Bullets Dreamcast; September 4, 2009; Neo Geo CD; November 19, 2007
- Genre: Scrolling shooter
- Mode: Single-player

Last Hope is a single-player horizontally scrolling shooter for the Neo Geo AES, Neo Geo CD, and Dreamcast systems. It was developed by German developer NG:Dev.Team in 2006. While the Neo Geo version was self-published, the Dreamcast version was released by RedSpotGames in January 2007 as an unlicensed title. In 2009 the Dreamcast version received a reprint in the form of a director's cut called Last Hope: Pink Bullets which addressed several gameplay-related issues. A Neo Geo version of Pink Bullets was released in February 2011.

== Plot ==
Neo Geo screenshot

An evil empire from another galaxy is heading towards Earth. Barely 24 hours beforehand, they had penetrated the last line of defense in Earth's galaxy, the Arsion Laser Belt. Millions of innocent people perished in outer space colonies, and 70% of Earth's fleet was destroyed during first contact. Intelligence reports six days until their arrival. As conventional weapons cannot stop them, the last hope is in the playable pilot's hands: the Z-42 Warpstar. The pilot's mission is to warp into the enemy's territories and destroy their leader before they reach Earth.

== Development ==
Last Hope is a game from the developer NG:Dev.Team which consisted of two brothers. The brothers said that "We were fans of 16-bit games and wanted to create our own. As I was a huge Neo Geo fan and collector, my dream was to develop for that system.". After months of reverse engineering, a prototype was developed which later became Last Hope.

== Release ==
July 10, 2006: NG:Dev.Team produced 60 Units of the game for Neo Geo and sold it directly via their website.

January 30, 2007: RedSpotGames published 2500 Units of the game (500 copies were reserved for sale with the Limited Edition).

May 3, 2007: The Limited Edition of Last Hope was released with 500 vinyl-styled compact discs containing the soundtrack.

November 19, 2007: NG:Dev.Team produced 500 units for Neo Geo CD.

September 4, 2009: NG:Dev.Team produced 1000 Units of Last Hope: Pink Bullets, which were distributed Internationally by RedSpotGames.

As a response to criticism regarding the game's difficulty, NG:Dev.Team released an updated version titled Last Hope: Pink Bullets for the Dreamcast on September 19, 2009, with a Neo Geo version releasing on February 21, 2011. This edition features improved on-screen visibility in comparison to its first print due to the titular pink bullets, as well as various other features to make for a more accessible gameplay experience with an emphasis on scoring.

Since only 60 copies of the Neo Geo AES version were ever produced, and were only available for purchase directly from NG:Dev.Team, this is an extremely rare and collectible title. Due to the low availability and high cost of producing the cartridges, the game was sold for €550 (around $730). In contrast, the Dreamcast version sells for $40, and the "Limited Edition" with bundled soundtrack CD was sold for $80. Van Basilco and Play-Asia were the only online stores approved to sell Last Hope for the Dreamcast. The Limited Edition was limited to only 500 units and is already a highly sought after item. It sold out 5 days after the release day and currently prices up to $259.

== Reception ==
Reception

Review scores
Publication	Score
GamesTM	(DC) 80%
Jeuxvideo.com	(NG) 14/20 (DC) 15/20
M! Games	(DC) 54%
neXGam	(NG) 7.8/10 (DC) 8.0/10
PC Action	(DC) Good

Comparisons were drawn to "old school" shooters like R-Type and Gradius, but especially of Pulstar, with its "tactical" gameplay and pre-rendered backgrounds and sprites.

The game has been criticized for featuring very hard to distinguish enemy-bullets which are almost the same color as explosions/debris.

Some reviewers have commended Last Hope as technically impressive for Neo Geo standards, while others focus criticism on gameplay issues.

The Neo Geo CD version of this game features higher visibility due to pink colored bullets, which are better to distinguish between explosions/debris. In response to the criticism, Last Hope: Pink Bullets was released in 2009 for Dreamcast. The ratings range from 54% (MAN!AC, Germany) to 80% (GamesTM, UK) or second best score "good" (PC Action, Germany)

== See also ==
- List of commercially released independently developed Dreamcast games
