= DUX (video game) =

2013 shooter video game

- Developer: HUCAST.Net
- Publisher: HUCAST.Net
- Designers: René Hellwig; Martin Konrad
- Composer: Andre Neumann
- Platform: Dreamcast
- Release: July 17, 2009
- Genre: Scrolling shooter
- Mode: Single-player

DUX is a scrolling shooter video game developed by independent German studio HUCAST.Net for the Dreamcast. The game was released on July 17, 2009 worldwide.

== Gameplay ==
Gameplay screenshot

Influenced by Gradius and R-Type, DUX is a horizontally scrolling shooter that relies on tactics rather than fast reflexes. There are several powers the players can use, such as power pod (absorbing bullets while hitting the fire back), charge shot (doing maximum damage blows in a single wave), and onboard missiles (can be fired in any direction around the ship). During the game, the main background can be adjusted in a menu, allowing for a clearer view.

== Development ==
DUX was developed by HUCAST.Net for the Sega Dreamcast. Designer René Hellwig started HUCAST.Net and he wanted to make DUX as a modern shoot 'em up video game. They opted to go for Dreamcast, as the Neo Geo would be "impossible" to do that with. DUX had been in a development delay for almost a year, specifically because of various bugs, one of them allowing a maximum score from the first level. After the players complained about the state of the original game, HUCAST had promised to provide the owners a revised version named DUX 1.5, free of charge.

== Legacy ==
A Kickstarter project for a remake of the original game started in May 2012. It was called Redux: Dark Matters and was scheduled for a release on PSN, XBLA, Steam and iOS, as well as the Dreamcast. The latter version was originally available only as a Kickstarter reward but Redux 1.1 was later sold separately. The project reached its funding goal of $25,000 on 14 May, after only a few days. The Dreamcast version was released on January 27, 2014.
