= Midnight Madness (puzzle hunt) =

US puzzlehunt

Midnight Madness is a large-scale overnight puzzle hunt held in New York City. One of the longest-running, most extravagant, and influential examples of a location-based puzzle hunt, it has been described as "The Super Bowl of Puzzling".

First organized in 1996 by Columbia University seniors Mat Laibowitz and Dan Michaelson, the event grew from a small underground competition into a high-profile charity scavenger hunt associated with the financial industry. The format typically sends teams across the city overnight to solve multi-stage puzzles combining logic, physical challenges, narrative, and urban navigation.

The event received broad media attention for its 2013 revival under Goldman Sachs executive Elisha Wiesel, who introduced a charity fundraiser model for the event. It connects teams from New York's financial, legal, and technology sectors with the nonprofit Good Shepherd Services, for whom the event raises over $1 million annually. A successor event using the same format continued under the name Compass from 2017 until 2023. In 2025, it reverted to its Midnight Madness brand under the stewardship of Gotham Immersive Laboratories.

== History ==
=== Early years (1996–2007) ===
Midnight Madness began in 1996, drawing roughly 20 players and featuring a handful of puzzles hidden throughout New York City, as a tribute to the 1980 film of the same name. Ten editions were run through 2007, maintaining the event's informal structure, lack of entry fees, and emphasis on urban exploration. Laibowitz and Michaelson stopped producing the event because, as Michaelson put it, “Opportunity costs were too big. It was almost interfering with our careers.”

=== Goldman Sachs revival (2012–2017) ===
In 2012, Elisha Wiesel, a player of the original game, contacted co-creator Michaelson to revive the hunt as a charity fundraiser. This new financial model allowed sufficient funds to be raised to both host the event, while simultaneously benefitting NYC nonprofit Good Shepherd Services.

Starting in 2013, media coverage highlighted the event's new scale and the extensive participation of Goldman Sachs employees. Notable challenges from Weisel's tenure included a laser-based mini-golf course constructed inside an abandoned building, a mobile app allowing participants to change the lights atop One Bryant Park, theatrical storylines based on NYC history, and millions of dollars raised every two years for Good Shepherd Services.

Distinctives of the game evolved during this time to include access to hidden and exclusive New York City locations, real-time GPS tracking, custom web and physical technology, and an elaborate Slack-based, concierge hinting system called "Game Control".

=== Compass (2017–2023) ===
Wiesel ultimately stepped back after designing the game for several years, citing the time commitment involved. The winning team from Wiesel's final year, representing Pine River Capital Management, stepped up to continue the event's tradition. Led by Colin Teichholtz and Ben Hoffstein, they changed the name to Compass, not only to differentiate it from Wiesel's work, but "...also because Good Shepherd provides direction to struggling children, youth and families."

They also moved the event from a sundown-to-sunup schedule to an "early afternoon to early morning" schedule, in order to be slightly easier on participants.

The organizers planned extensively during the COVID-19 pandemic in order to make sure that the biannual event could run as scheduled in the fall of 2021, despite the ongoing challenges.

=== Gotham Immersive Laboratories (2025) ===
Beginning in 2021, NYC immersive production company Gotham Immersive Laboratories (GIL) began assisting in the creation of the event. In 2025, thery assumed full control of the event, reverting fully to the Midnight Madness brand and format. GIL, known for another New York City-based puzzle hunt, "The Great Gotham Challenge", often incorporates immersive theatre, alternate reality gaming, and technology into their puzzle design, and has brought these elements to Midnight Madness.

== Legacy ==
Midnight Madness has been cited as an influential and early progenitor of large-scale adult puzzle hunts, immersive urban games, and escape rooms in the United States. It has also spawned a UK-based Midnight Madness event that shares much of the same structure, including its charity connection. Notable other examples sharing or influenced by its structure include the Microsoft Puzzle Hunt, MIT Mystery Hunt, and The Game (treasure hunt). These puzzle events typically involve:

- Teams navigating an urban environment, often overnight.
- Multi-step puzzles requiring logic, observation, and physical tasks.
- Interaction with actors or props.
- Use of custom technology, including apps and engineered physical devices.

== See also ==
- Puzzle hunt
- Scavenger hunt
- Alternate reality game
- Immersive theatre
