= Midnight Madness =

Midnight Madness may refer to:

- Midnight Madness (basketball), an annual American college basketball event

== Music ==
- Midnight Madness (album), a 1983 album by Night Ranger
- "Midnight Madness" (song), a 2008 song by The Chemical Brothers
- "Midnight Madness", 2017 DragonForce song from Reaching into Infinity
- "Midnight Madness", 2011 Lake of Tears song from Illwill
- "Midnight Madness", 2000 Sinergy song from To Hell and Back

== Television ==
- "Midnight Madness" (6teen), a 2005 episode of 6teen
- "Midnight Madness", c.2007 season 3 episode of Being Ian
- "Midnight Madness", 2006 season 3 episode Ben 10

== Films ==
- Midnight Madness (1980 film), a comedy
- Midnight Madness (1918 film), a silent film starring Harry von Meter
- Midnight Madness (1928 film), silent film starring Jacqueline Logan; produced by Cecil B. DeMille

== Other uses ==
- Vegas Games 2000, a gambling simulation video game also known as Vegas Games: Midnight Madness
- Midnight Madness (puzzle hunt), an annual event in New York City, US
- Midnight Madness, a track of films screening at midnights at the Toronto International Film Festival.

== See also ==
- "The Tale of the Midnight Madness", 1993 season 2 episode of Are You Afraid of the Dark?
- Witching hour (supernatural)
