= Donald Luskin =

American businessman

Donald Luskin (born April 1954) is Chief Investment Officer for Trend Macrolytics LLC, a consulting firm he founded in 2001, providing investment strategy and macroeconomics forecasting and research for institutional investors. Luskin contributes commentaries on the editorial page of the Wall Street Journal, and appears regularly on Fox Business. He was formerly a CNBC contributor, a contributing editor and columnist for National Review Online (NRO), and a columnist for TheStreet.com. His media commentaries and appearances touch on investing, economic and political matters.

Luskin has published three books, Index Options and Futures: The Complete Guide, Portfolio Insurance: A Guide to Dynamic Hedging and I Am John Galt: Today's Heroic Innovators Building the World and the Villainous Parasites Destroying It (co-author Andrew Greta).

Luskin also wrote a blog, "The Conspiracy to Keep You Poor and Stupid," based on the title of his as-yet unpublished book. The blog's tagline was: "How big government, big business, big media and big academia block your road to financial freedom—and tell you it's for your own good." Luskin is a self-avowed libertarian, and his blog linked to other financial and political blogs espousing similar beliefs.

== Biography and achievements ==
On his former blog, Luskin stated he "attended Yale in 1973–1974; dropped out to rejoin the real world as soon as possible."

After dropping out of college, Luskin worked for several years as a creative consultant to Los Angeles companies such as Mattel and Teledyne, and motion picture studios LucasFilm and Warner Brothers, where he worked on iconic films such as Stanley Kubrick's The Shining and Ken Russell's Altered States. He and two colleagues developed a series of all-night treasure-hunts, one of which was adapted into the Walt Disney motion picture Midnight Madness.

Luskin's investment career began in 1979, when he started a hedge fund while an options market maker on the Pacific Stock Exchange. As his fund grew and evolved, he became a market maker on the Chicago Board Options Exchange (where he helped pioneer index options trading, executing the very first OEX contract) and the New York Stock Exchange, where he traded the first option contract in the NYSE's history.

In 1984 Luskin joined Jefferies & Co., a brokerage firm. There as senior vice president, he invented POSIT, a crossing network enabling institutional investors to exchange entire portfolios with each other. POSIT was later spun out of Jefferies as a separate publicly traded company, Investment Technology Group.

In 1987 Luskin joined Wells Fargo Investment Advisors, a division of Wells Fargo Bank, as senior vice president in charge of investment management and trading. He became vice chairman when the firm merged with Nikko Securities in 1989, becoming Wells Fargo Nikko Investment Advisors. When the firm was acquired by Barclays Bank in 1995 and became Barclays Global Investors, Luskin became chief executive officer of the firm's global business in mutual funds. The firm was subsequently acquired by BlackRock. Over Luskin's eleven years with the firm, assets under management grew from $69 billion to over $500 billion. Luskin was responsible for numerous innovations in index funds and quantitative investing—including the development of domestic and international quant-active funds, every one of which outperformed its benchmark over Luskin's tenure. Luskin developed the iShares ETF family and created the LifePath funds, the first target-date mutual funds, for which he is the named inventor on a US patent.

In August 1999, during the tech bubble, Luskin and partner Dave Nadig started the MetaMarkets Open Fund, the first mutual fund to publish trades and list its holdings in real-time via its website. This "transparency" and "openness," Luskin and Nadig said, was a step forward in the financial world, equivalent to the political revolutions and international democratic transformations of the 1990s, because it leveled the playing field for the average investor and overthrew "financial elites." MetaMarkets.com, the venture-backed company that Luskin and Nadig founded to operate OpenFund, was funded primarily by the venture arm of global luxury goods firm LVMH. It was hailed by Fortune magazine as one of the "coolest companies" in America in 2000. Their model was dismissed by some analysts as being a "gimmick," having nothing to do with investing per se: "They brought chat boards to life in a mutual fund." At its peak, OpenFund received $45 million in investments, and the fund's biggest positions included companies like JDS Uniphase and Extreme Networks. At the end of 1999, OpenFund was among a handful of the best-performing mutual funds in America. After the market top in March 2000, the valuations of technology companies collapsed and many OpenFund investors redeemed their shares. The fund was shut down in the summer of 2001, after losing much of its investors' money. Published reports note that the open fund lost over half its value.

== Predictions ==
Over the years, some of Luskin’s predictions have drawn controversy. In May 2001, when he was a columnist for the financial website theStreet.com, he predicted a new bull market in gold and gold stocks, for which he drew intense criticism from fellow columnists including Jim Cramer. Shortly thereafter, Luskin's escalating public dispute with Cramer led to his resignation from theStreet.com via real-time postings on the site's discussion boards that became a cause célèbre on the web.

Luskin's predictions courted controversy again in 2008 when, in a September The Washington Post opinion piece, he cited evidence of what he claimed were factual errors made by Barack Obama and members of his presidential campaign concerning the state of the economy. Luskin claimed that the market was healthy, and Obama was simply using the state of the economy to discredit John McCain. However, the following day, Lehman Brothers filed for the biggest bankruptcy in US history and two days later, on September 16, stock markets imploded. Additionally, in the same editorial, he cited evidence that the economy was weak, but not in recession. He wrote, "…anyone who says we're in a recession, or heading into one—especially the worst one since the Great Depression—is making up his own private definition of recession." Shortly afterward, following the sudden collapse of Lehman and several other large financial firms, the economy sharply worsened, and was subsequently declared to have been in recession all year by the National Bureau of Economic Research. Foreign Policy included Luskin's prediction in its list of "The 10 Worst Predictions for 2008" on its website. The editors of The Yale Book of Quotations also made note of the inopportune timing of Luskin's editorial and included his prediction in their list of "Top ten quotes of 2008". He has been singled out for "some of the worst, money losing commentary of the past few years."

== Conflicts with Paul Krugman ==
Luskin has been controversial as a public intellectual. Much of his blog and many of his NRO columns were devoted to arguments that economic facts, figures, and trends are distorted by politicians, pundits and the media. He has a particular animosity towards The New York Times, especially columnist and Nobel laureate Paul Krugman, whose economic pronouncements he endeavored to debunk. Luskin was de facto leader of what he called the "Krugman Truth Squad," an ad hoc group of bloggers dedicated to detailing and rebutting what they consider Krugman's lies and distortions.

According to Daniel Okrent, former Public Editor of the Times, "Luskin serves as Javert to Krugman's Jean Valjean. From a perch on National Review Online, he regularly assaults Krugman's logic, his politics, his economic theories, his character and his accuracy." Luskin claims that his work has resulted in corrections from Krugman and "the imposition of a new and more rigorous corrections policy for the entire Times editorial page."

Krugman occasionally responded directly to Luskin's criticisms. In one instance Luskin accused Krugman of making an error in his appraisal of the costs and effects of the 2003 tax cuts. Krugman responded with a series of postings on his website. In one such posting, apparently referring to the persistence of Luskin's criticisms, Krugman humorously referred to Luskin as his "stalker-in-chief". Later, after Luskin appeared at a Krugman book signing, Krugman said of Luskin on the Fox News television program Hannity and Colmes, "That's a guy, that's a guy who actually stalks me on the web, and once stalked me personally". The animosity between Luskin and Krugman became so intense it became the subject of a story in The New Yorker with extensive remarks from both men. Krugman's characterization of Luskin as a stalker was repeated by blogger Atrios (Duncan Black) prompting a threat of legal action from lawyers representing Luskin.
