= MIT Mystery Hunt =

Annual puzzlehunt at MIT

The MIT Mystery Hunt is an annual puzzle hunt competition at the Massachusetts Institute of Technology in Cambridge, Massachusetts. It is one of the oldest and most complex puzzle hunts in the world and attracts over 200 teams and 5,000 contestants (with more than half on campus) annually in teams of 5 to 150 people. It has inspired similar competitions at Microsoft, Stanford University, Melbourne University, University of South Carolina, University of Illinois at Urbana–Champaign and University of Aveiro (Portugal) as well as in the Seattle, San Francisco, Miami, Washington, D.C., Indianapolis and Columbus, Ohio metropolitan areas. Because the puzzle solutions often require knowledge of esoteric and eclectic topics, the hunt is sometimes used to exemplify popular stereotypes of MIT students.

The hunt begins at noon on the Friday before Martin Luther King Jr. Day, when the teams assemble to receive the first puzzles. It concludes with a puzzle-guided journey (a "runaround") to find a "coin" hidden on MIT's campus. Each puzzle hunt is created and organized by the winning team of the previous year, which can lead to substantial differences in the rules and structure. While early hunts involved a few dozen linear puzzles, recent hunts have increased in complexity, some involving as many as 250 distinct puzzles arranged in rounds, hidden rounds, and metapuzzles. Recent hunts have also revolved around themes introduced as a skit by organizers at the opening ceremony.

== Structure ==
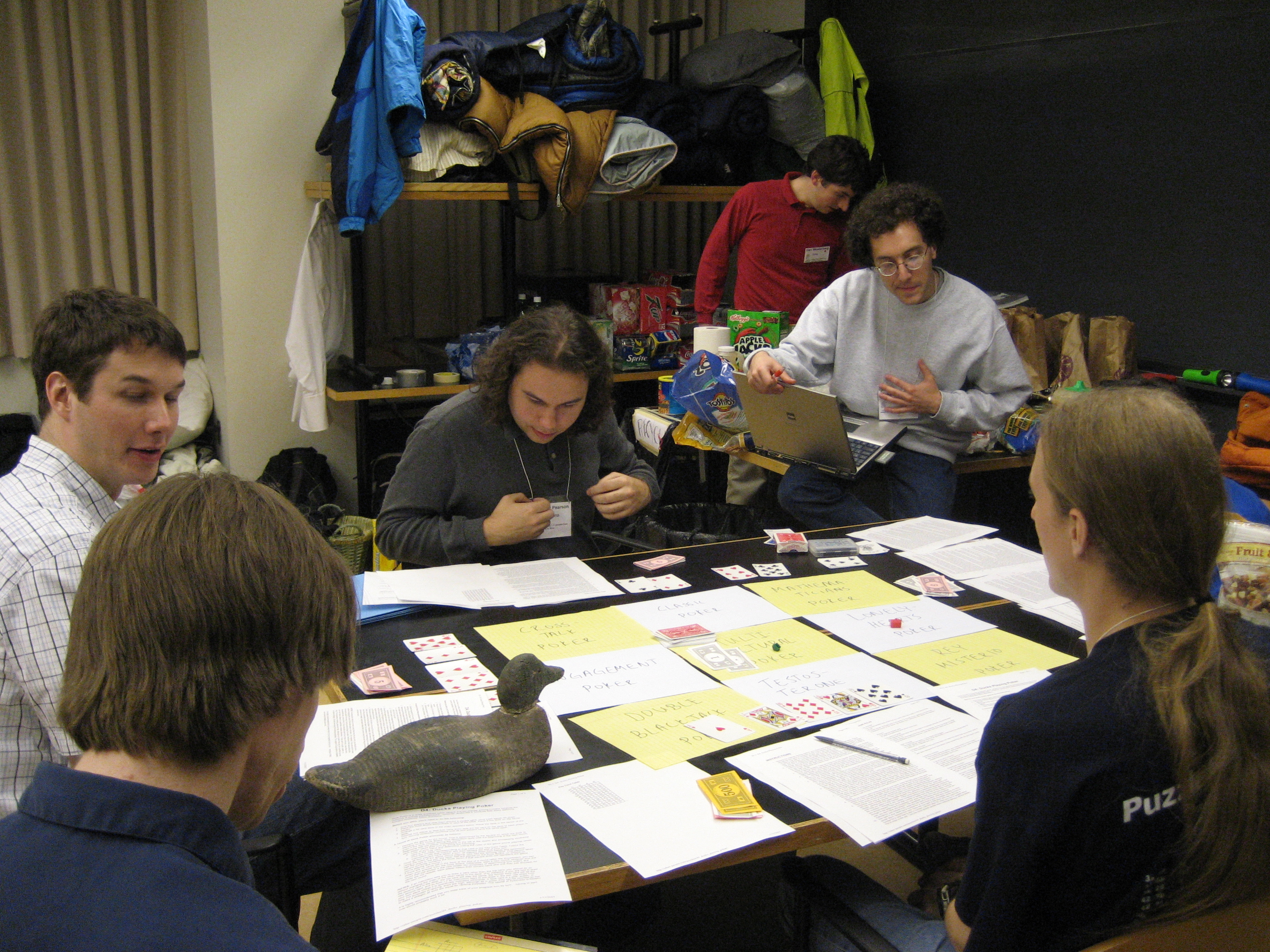
Many teams hunt in rooms with chalkboards, projectors, computers, and food.

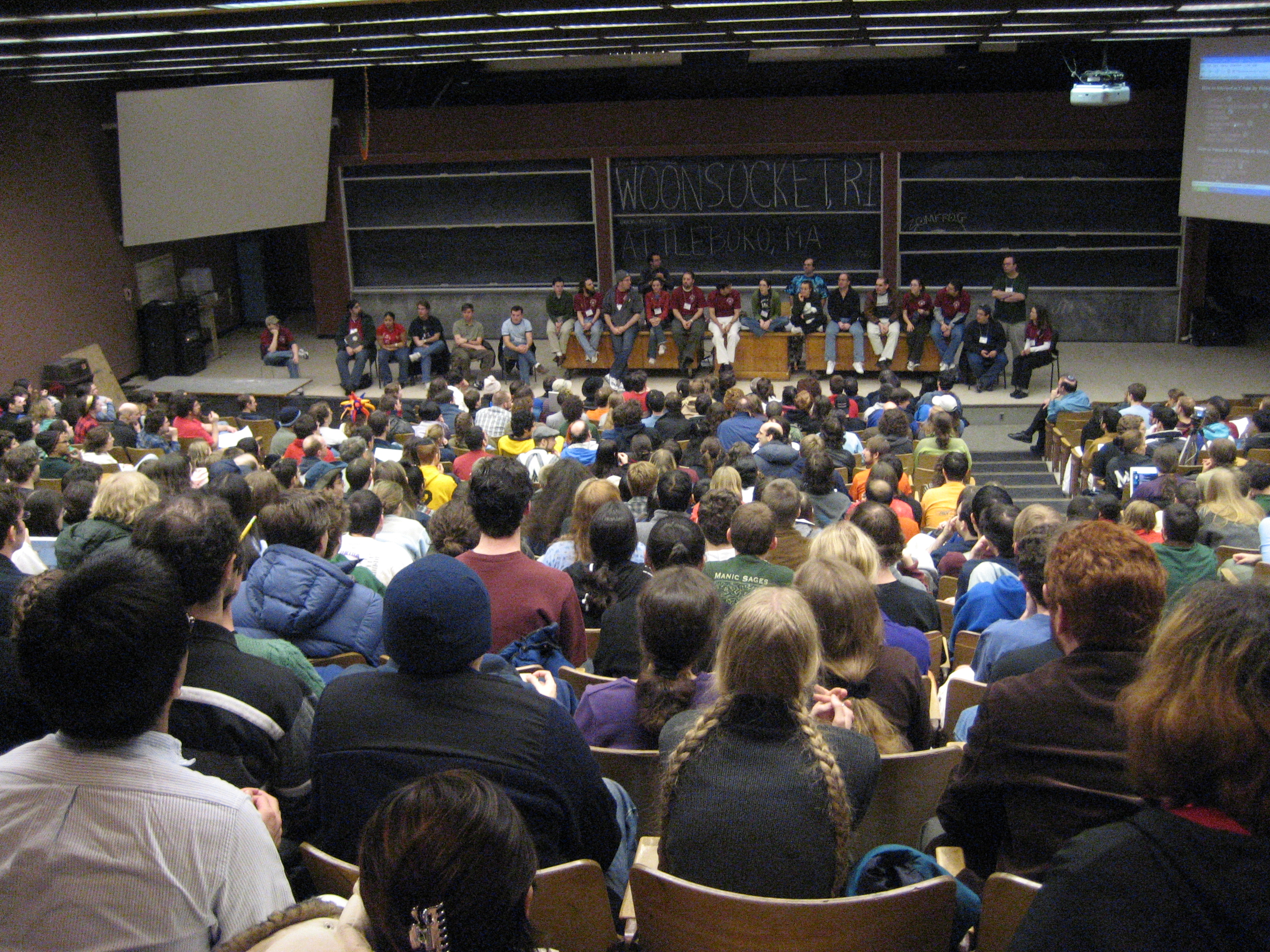
The 2007 hunt concluded with a wrap-up session in this large MIT lecture hall.

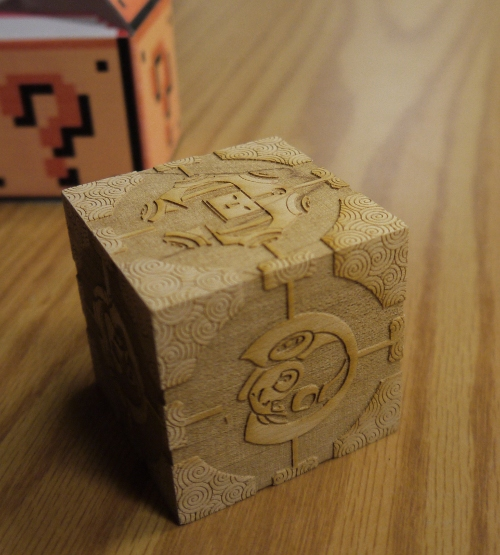
A coin used by the creators of the 2011 hunt

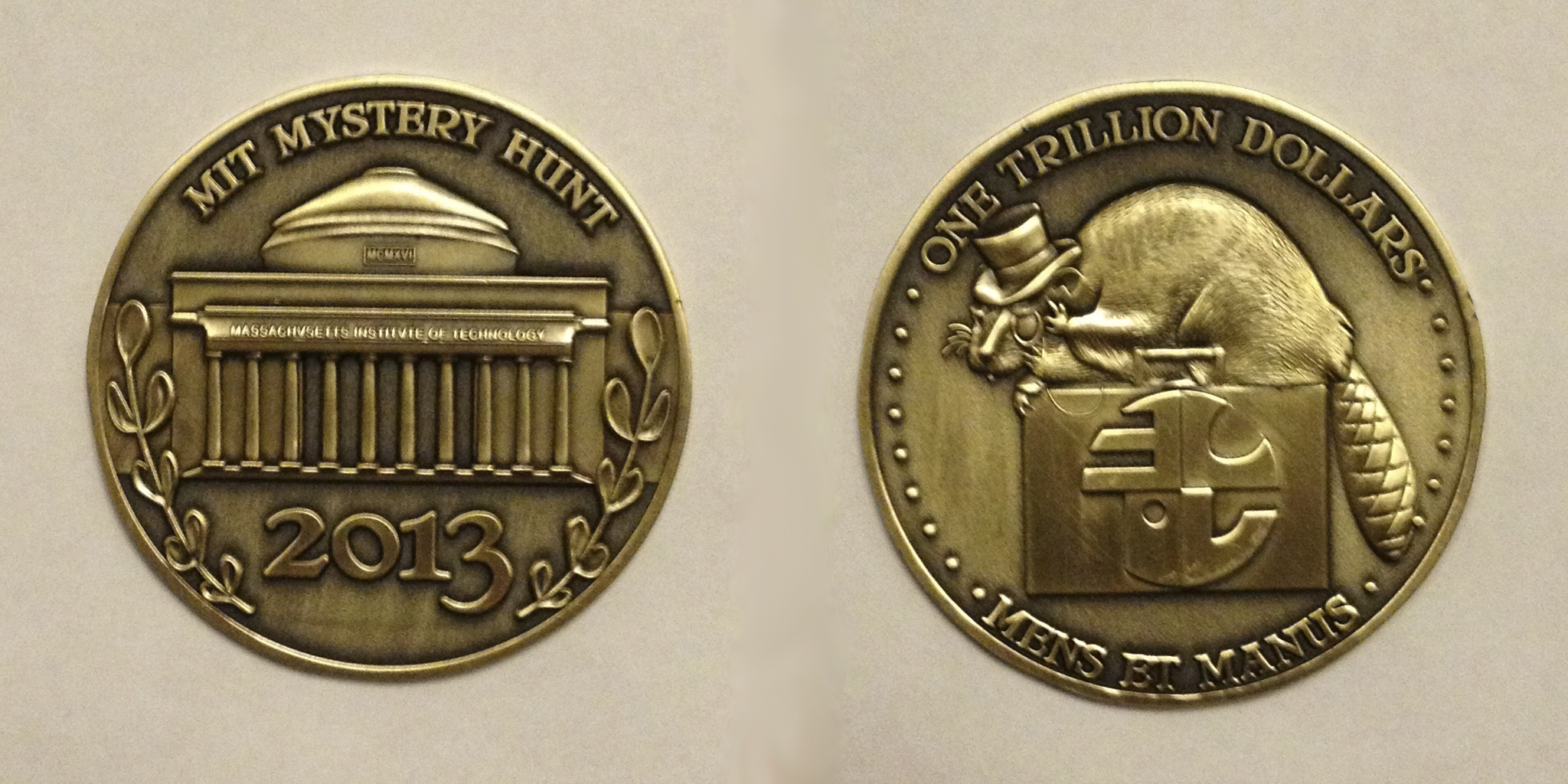
This coin was found by the winning team in 2013, after the longest hunt on record.

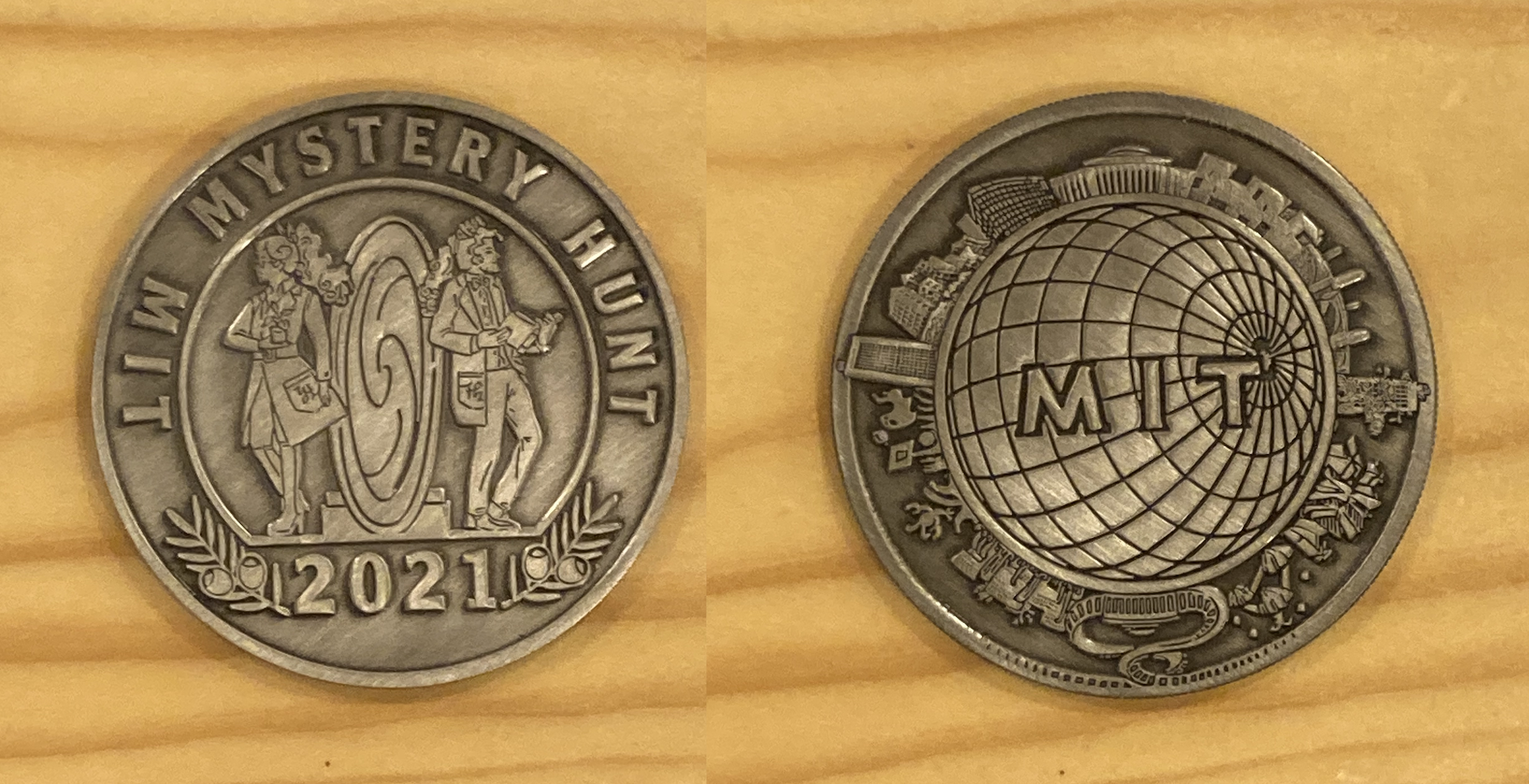
The coin received by the winning team in 2021

The objective of the hunt is to solve a set of puzzles in order to locate a coin hidden on the MIT campus. Participants can organize into teams of any size and are not required to be physically present. In recent years, team sizes have grown to around 200 solvers for the largest teams. The proportion of hunters who participate remotely has grown over time, as well.

The hunt and its puzzles are organized and created by the team that won the event the previous year, ensuring that no hunt will be won (or run) consecutively by the same people; each year's writers are free to change any aspects of the internal structure of the Hunt. At noon on the Friday before Martin Luther King Jr. Day the teams gather at MIT, where organizers present a skit revealing the hunt's theme and the initial round of puzzles, as well as announcing rules and other administrative matters. The teams can locate their headquarters anywhere and, over the course of the Hunt, check in with the organizers to verify the answers to individual puzzles. Some teams make extensive use of remote solvers—players who are located beyond the MIT campus. After the Hunt concludes, the organizers typically hold a wrap-up meeting at which the solutions to all the metapuzzles and the overall structure of the Hunt are revealed. Since 2009, hunts have been run for a fixed duration regardless of when the coin is first found, allowing more than one team to complete it (the record for most teams to complete a hunt is the 2017 Hunt: 17 teams completed it, the winners took only 18 hours).

While the puzzles in early hunts were either linear (after solving one puzzle, a new puzzle would be revealed) or released en masse, since 1998 the puzzles have been released in rounds. Successive rounds can be released at predetermined times, based upon completing a requisite number of puzzles in a previous round, or based on another metric entirely. The distinguishing feature of the present-day Mystery Hunt is employing the solutions to all the puzzles in a round to solve a metapuzzle, usually lacking any instructions. Once a team has solved all the metapuzzles, it may begin the "runaround" phase to find the hidden coin: the team follows a series of clues or puzzles that leads them from one location on the MIT campus to another until reaching the location where the coin is hidden. The entire hunt usually lasts approximately 48 hours, although the 2003, 2013, 2023, and 2024 hunts all required over 60 hours for the winning team, ending on Monday. Although the hidden prize is always called "the coin", a variety of items have been used as the "coin", including a compact disc, a fragment of a meteorite, a snowglobe, and a wooden cube.

The mystery hunt employs a wide range of puzzles including crosswords, cryptic crosswords, logic puzzles, jigsaw puzzles, anagrams, connect-the-dots, ciphers, riddles, paint by numbers, sudokus, and word searches. Solutions to these classic puzzles are further complicated by employing arcane or esoteric topics like quantum computing, stereoisomers, ancient Greek, Klingon, Bach cantatas, coinage of Africa, and Barbie dolls. Puzzles might also employ pictures, audio files, video games, physical objects, and/or locations within MIT or the Boston area. The hunt also assumes extensive familiarity with MIT's campus, culture, and lore.

== History ==
The Mystery Hunt was started in 1981 by then-graduate student Bradley Schaefer. The first Hunt consisted of 12 subclues on a single sheet of paper including a Vigenere cipher, a short runaround, and an integral. The answers to the subclues detailed the location of an Indian Head cent hidden on campus. The individuals who found the coin were allowed to take their pick of a $20 gift certificate to the school bookstore, a $50 donation to the charity of their choice, and a keg of beer. The hunt was organized for the next two years by Schaefer and after he graduated, the winners were given the honor of writing the hunt the next year.

Over the next several years, the hunt became longer and more involved as the number of participants increased. The earliest recorded theme is Captain Red Herring's Mystery Island in 1992. The 1984 Hunt had 22 clues, and the 1987 Hunt had 19 clues and a final runaround. The Mystery Hunt has continued to grow, with the 2014 Hunt containing 115 puzzles, 10 metapuzzles, 5 events, a 24-puzzle mid-hunt runaround, and a 5-puzzle final runaround.

Though metapuzzles have existed in some form for many Mystery Hunts, the structure regarding how the puzzles combine into metapuzzles and how puzzles are released varies. For example, in the 2006 Hunt, "antepuzzles" provided access to new rounds, whose answers were derived from pieces of information attached to the round puzzles, but otherwise irrelevant to them (for example, the colors in which the puzzle titles were printed); in the 2009 Hunt, apart from the shorter introductory rounds, each main round had a unique structure and way of releasing new puzzles. In some Hunts, such as 1999's and 2008's, solvers are not told which sets of puzzles must be combined to create metapuzzles; figuring out the correct groupings is part of the puzzle.

While the hunt is hosted on MIT's campus, puzzles are generally delivered through a website that tracks team progress on puzzles that updates when puzzles are solved. Puzzles may also involve physical components to be solved on campus. In 2021 and 2022, the Mystery Hunt was held entirely remotely, due to the COVID-19 pandemic.

=== List of Hunts ===
Year	Author	Winner	Theme description
1981	Brad Schaefer		
1982	Brad Schaefer		
1983	Brad Schaefer	Holman Reactionary Army (Jean-Joseph Coté)	
1984	Jean-Joseph Coté	Michael D. O'Keefe, Gregory R. Wanish, Bradford J. Wargelin, Rhonda M. Wilson, William M. Hobbib	
1985	James L. Petivan and Dhanesh K. Samarasan (as JIM and DKS)		
1986		Mystery Hunt '86: Dave Gower, Greg Harrison, Dave Glassner; Great IAP Mystery Hunt: unspecified Next House team	
1987			
1988	Eric Albert	The Black Seven	
1989	The Black Seven		
1990	The Spanish Inquisition		
1991	Jan Maessen and Stephen Rinehart		
1992			"Captain Red Herring's Mystery Island"
1993			A search for the Holy Grail
1994	Eric Albert, Julian West, and others		The cyberpunk genre
1995	Mark Gottlieb	The Spanish Inquisition	The game Clue
1996	Richard Garfield, Skaff Elias, et al.	Chaos (Mark Gottlieb)	The book Gödel, Escher, Bach: An Eternal Golden Braid by Douglas Hofstadter
1997	Mark Gottlieb	Palindrome (Ainamania)	Elvis Presley
1998	Palindrome (Ainamania)	Iliaphay	Getting a college degree in Enigmatology
1999	Acme (formerly Iliaphay)	Setec Astronomy	Carmen Sandiego
2000	Setec Astronomy	Palindrome (PAINTTTNIAP)	The movie The Wizard of Oz
2001	Palindrome (PAINTTTNIAP)	Setec Astronomy	The horror genre
2002	Setec Astronomy	Acme	The game Monopoly
2003	Acme	Kappa Sig	The movie The Matrix
2004	The French Armada (formerly Kappa Sig)	Setec Astronomy	The movie Time Bandits
2005	Setec Astronomy	Physical Plant	Superhero powers
2006	Physical Plant	The Evil Midnight Bombers What Bomb At Midnight	The espionage genre
2007	The Evil Midnight Bombers What Bomb At Midnight	Palindrome (Dr. Awkward)	Hell and the Seven Deadly Sins
2008	Palindrome (Dr. Awkward)	The Evil Midnight Bombers What Bomb At Midnight	A whodunit murder mystery
2009	The Evil Midnight Bombers What Bomb At Midnight	Beginner's Luck	A sci-fi themed hunt based around Escape from Zyzzlvaria, an invented science fiction board game
2010	Beginner's Luck	Metaphysical Plant	Alternate history and the (mostly fictional) history of the Mystery Hunt itself
2011	Metaphysical Plant	Codex	Video games, especially Super Mario Bros. and Portal
2012	Codex	Manic Sages	The movie and musical The Producers, and musical theatre in general
2013	Manic Sages	The entire text of Atlas Shrugged	A bank heist
2014	Alice Shrugged (formerly the entire text of Atlas Shrugged)	One Fish Two Fish Random Fish Blue Fish	Lewis Carroll's Alice in Wonderland
2015	One Fish Two Fish Random Fish Blue Fish	Luck, I Am Your Father	The exploration of the ocean
2016	Luck, I Am Your Father	Setec Astronomy	The movie Inception, and sleep in general
2017	Setec Astronomy	Death and Mayhem	A role-playing game similar to Dungeons & Dragons
2018	Life and Order (formerly Death and Mayhem)	Setec Astronomy	The 2015 movie Inside Out
2019	Setec Astronomy	Left Out	Holidays, the Great Molasses Flood of 1919, and the movie The Nightmare Before Christmas
2020	Left Out	✈✈✈ Galactic Trendsetters ✈✈✈	“Penny Park”, a fictional amusement park
2021	✈✈✈ Galactic Trendsetters ✈✈✈	Palindrome (Not So Boston)	Exploring an alternate-universe version of MIT through a massively multiplayer online game
2022	Palindrome	teammate	Literary genres, and books in general
2023	teammate	The Team Formerly Known as the Team Formerly Known as the Team Formerly Known as the Team Formerly Known as the Team Formerly Known as the Team to Be Named Later	Exploring the "Puzzle Factory" and reactivating AIs created to write the Mystery Hunt
2024	The Team Formerly Known as the Team Formerly Known as the Team Formerly Known as the Team Formerly Known as the Team Formerly Known as the Team to Be Named Later	Death and Mayhem	Greek mythology
2025	Death and Mayhem	Cardinality	A film noir-style mystery
2026	Cardinality	The Providence Bureau of Invest-Egg-Ations	A Pokémon-style game

== See also ==
- University of Chicago Scavenger Hunt
- The Game
