= Maze of Games =

The Maze of Games is a puzzlehunt and interactive multimedia novel. It started in 1995 as one of America's largest annual puzzlehunts and an offshoot of LIVE/WIRE, held at the Gen Con and Origins gaming conventions before later being adapted into a novel. The Maze of Games has been the largest event at one or both of those conventions every year since. It was created by game designers Mark Gottlieb, Mike Selinker, and Teeuwynn Woodruff. The event uses puzzle placards to lead attendees in a maze throughout the convention, and uses meta-puzzles to unite the puzzles into a final answer. The event is designed so that the thousands of attendees can all play at once. $2500 worth of electrical tape was used to create the titular "Maze" on the convention show floor.

The Maze of Games ran at Origins from 1995 to 2001, then moved to Gen Con under the names Gen Con Time Warp (2002–2003), Gen Con Monster Hunt (2004), and Gen Con Doomsday Rally (2005), the latter a tie-in with Hasbro's Risk game. The Maze of Games returned to Origins in 2004, the first year it was held at both conventions simultaneously.

The Monster Hunt appeared in part in the July 2005 issue of Games Magazine, the second Time Warp in the November 2005 issue, and the Doomsday Rally as a series beginning in the April 2006 issue.

== Novel ==
Over the course of 18 years, Selinker attempted to create a novelization of the puzzlehunt. After finding no success shopping a manuscript among publishers, on January 28, 2013, he launched a Kickstarter project for an interactive novel with the same name. Written by Mike Selinker and illustrated by Pete Venters, The Maze of Games: An Interactive Puzzle Novel, published in July 2014, is described as a full-length puzzle novel with over 50 puzzles and a deeply engaging story. The book, inspired by the physical puzzlehunt, was published by Selinker's company, Lone Shark Games and is described as being the narrative behind the original puzzlehunt. The initial Kickstarter project was funded within 4 hours and 48 minutes and featured several stretch goals for backers. Eventually, an audiobook featuring actor Wil Wheaton and a soundtrack composed by Banner Saga composer Austin Wintory followed, along with an ebook.
