= Ludvig Strigeus =

Swedish computer programmer

- Born: 15 January 1981 (age 45)
- Occupations: Software engineer, Spotify AB
- Known for: μTorrent; Spotify; ScummVM; OpenTTD other software

Ludvig "Ludde" Strigeus (born 15 January 1981) is a Swedish programmer, best known for developing software such as the BitTorrent client μTorrent, OpenTTD, and Spotify.

== Early life and education ==
Strigeus was born in January 1981, and he graduated from Chalmers University of Technology with a master's degree in computer science and engineering.

== Career ==
He currently works as a software engineer at Spotify. In 2005, his development team won PuzzleCrack, a week-long puzzlehunt competition that combines problem-solving with computer hacking.

Ludvig Strigeus was awarded the 2006 John Ericsson (sv) Medal, the 2011 Tenzingpriset, 2015 honorary doctorate, and the 2020 Polhem Prize. In 2023 Ludvig was elected fellow of the Royal Swedish Academy of Engineering Sciences

== Personal life ==
He currently resides in Gothenburg, Sweden. Due to a rare muscular disease, Strigeus uses a wheelchair.

== Software ==
- μTorrent – small footprint BitTorrent client for Microsoft Windows and OS X (closed-source)
- ScummVM – interpreter of adventure game engines, most notably LucasArts's SCUMM
- OpenTTD – reverse engineered game engine of Transport Tycoon, led to many ports and game improvements over the original
- Ports of Dr. Mario and Kwirk for the TI-89 calculator
- "The Idiot" – card game for Windows
- WebWorks – a text HTML editor
- Spotify – a commercial music streaming service
  - Spotiamp – a lightweight Spotify Premium client for Windows, created as a tribute to Winamp
- TunSafe – VPN client for Windows using the WireGuard protocol
