= Bradley Schaefer =

American astronomer

- Born: Bradley Elliott Schaefer
- Education: Massachusetts Institute of Technology (Ph.D., 1983)
- Known for: MIT Mystery Hunt, photometry
- Awards: Breakthrough Prize in Fundamental Physics, Gruber Prize in Cosmology, LSU University Alumni Professor, LSU Distinguished Faculty Award
- Scientific career
- Fields: Astronomy
- Workplaces: Louisiana State University (LSU)

Bradley Elliott Schaefer is an emeritus professor of astronomy and astrophysics at Louisiana State University. He received his PhD from the Massachusetts Institute of Technology in 1983.

== Biography ==
In addition to his academic pursuits, Schaefer is remembered at MIT as the founder of the annual MIT Mystery Hunt in 1981 during his graduate studies there. The tradition of the hunt continues today.

His research interests include the use of photometry of exploding objects to get results of interest for physical cosmology. He has also researched the dwarf planet Pluto with the aim of understanding the atmospheric variability of the system. Bradley has also studied KIC 8462852, a star with unusual within-day light fluctuations of about 20 percent, and found that the century-long light (1890 to 1989) from the star faded by about 20 percent as well, adding to its unusual luminosity.

In 2005, at a meeting of the American Astronomical Society in San Diego, California, Schaefer reported on a potential link between the long-lost star catalog of Hipparchus and a sculpture called The Farnese Atlas, created in the 2nd century, and thus a potential source for antique astronomy. Hipparchus is considered to be one of the greatest astronomers of ancient times, but most of his works are lost to history. The Farnese Atlas depicts Atlas, from Greek mythology, bearing the weight of the heavens upon his shoulders. The heavens are represented by a globe showing the constellations as seen from Earth. By examining the positions of the constellations, Schaefer determined that they are accurately placed according to the positions they occupied at the time of Hipparchus. He concludes that Hipparchus's work may have been the reference for the statue.

He published this idea in the Journal for the History of Astronomy. Only a couple of months later, Dennis Duke published a counter-opinion proving Schaefer's hypothesis wrong.

In 2017, Schaefer conducted the lecture series, "The Remarkable Science of Ancient Astronomy", an introductory course covering the history of astronomy, from about 5000 BC to 1600 AD on all inhabited continents.

In 2010, Schaefer was awarded the LSU Distinguished Faculty Award as recognition of a sustained record of excellence in teaching and research. In 2012, for his teaching, Schaefer was named as the University Alumni Professor.

== Awards ==
In 2007, Schaefer was awarded a small share of the $500,000 Gruber Prize in Cosmology, as part of the Supernova Cosmology Project, for the discovery of dark energy. In 2015, for this discovery of dark energy, Schaefer again won a small share of the $3,000,000 Breakthrough Prize in Fundamental Physics. In October 2011, this work was awarded the Nobel Prize in Physics, with one half of the prize going to the head of the Supernova Cosmology Project, Saul Perlmutter, and the rest to the heads of a competing team.
