= Puzzled Pint =

International social event

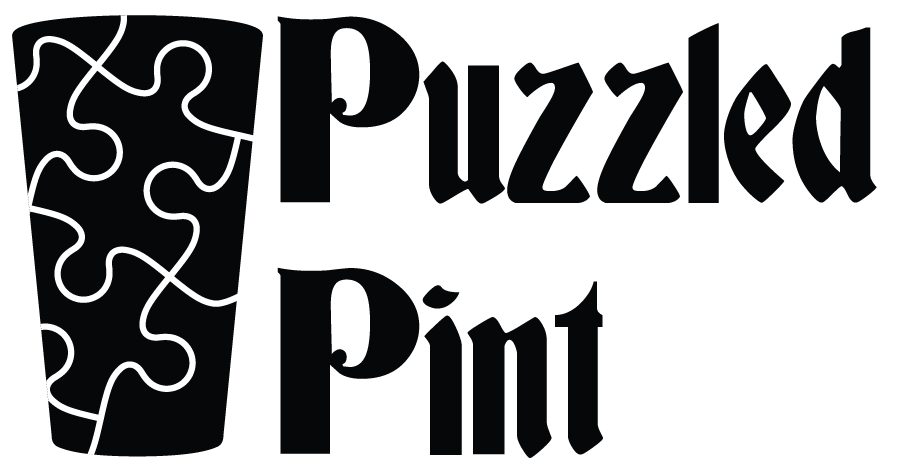
- Status: Active
- Genre: Puzzle solving
- Frequency: Monthly
- Country: International
- Inaugurated: July 13, 2010; 16 years ago
- Attendance: over 3,000
- Website: puzzledpint.com

Puzzled Pint is a monthly, casual, social puzzle-solving event held on the second Tuesday of each month in 50+ cities around the world, with every location using the same puzzles. Global monthly attendance exceeds 3000. It follows the pattern of a conference-room style puzzle hunt, with teams receiving packets of 4-5 puzzles, usually with the answers feeding into a final metapuzzle. There is no prize.

Most cities rotate the location to a new bar every month. The Friday before each event, a location puzzle is posted to the website. Solving this puzzle will lead players to that month's “secret” location.

Puzzled Pint is a not-for-profit, volunteer-run event, with a goal of introducing new players to the world of puzzlehunts. The emphasis is on the casual nature of the evening. The puzzles are not as advanced or numerous as day-long or weekend puzzle events, and hints are always free. An archive of all previous puzzles is on the website and available under a flexible Creative Commons license so that they may be repurposed for other events and activities.

== History ==
Puzzled Pint was started in July 2010 in Portland, Oregon; that city now sees a regular attendance of at least 100 players.

It expanded to include Seattle in October 2012, and additional cities have been added over the years, to 60 locations and 3113 players in August 2018.

From April 2020 the puzzles began to be posted online on event dates, due to the COVID-19 pandemic. This continued until the end of 2022, when puzzles were posted online the day after each event.

== Themes ==
Puzzled Pint has had a theme every month since its third event in September 2010. Themes have included "Dracula", "Die Hard" and "Planning an Art Heist".

November 2012's event, themed around webcomics, was the first Puzzled Pint to include a Bonus Puzzle that could optionally be solved.
