= PuzzleCrack =

Former University of Illinois annual tradition

PuzzleCrack was an annual tradition at the University of Illinois at Urbana-Champaign. It is a weeklong puzzlehunt competition that combines problem-solving with computer hacking.

== History ==
The competition began in October 2002 under the name Puzzlehack. It took place during the annual UIUC ACM's reflections❘projections conference in 2002 and 2003, was sponsored by Microsoft, and was run by Microsoft employees and UIUC alumni Josh Michaels and Igor Kofman.

In October 2004, Don Schmidt and Dan Sledz took over as heads of Puzzlehack. The year's contest was simply known as "Puzzle 3".

In 2005, the contest returned under a new name, PuzzleCrack, and was run by past winner and UIUC alumnus Bert Johnson of Allbase, Inc. Google and ACM provided prizes. 2005's contest involved a record number of participants.

PuzzleCrack 2006 was run from October 16 to October 20, 2006, again by Bert Johnson of Allbase. Prizes were sponsored by Microsoft, and, once again, records were broken. More than 5,000 people viewed the puzzles and hundreds of teams participated.

PuzzleCrack 2007 took place from October 8 to October 12, 2007 and was run by "The Big Enchilada". Prizes were provided by Amazon.com and Microsoft, and both viewership and participation broke the previous year's records.

PuzzleCrack 2008 took place between October 20 to October 24, 2008, again by "The Big Enchilada". Prizes were provided by Amazon.com and Microsoft. This was the first year where the competition ended in a tie.

PuzzleCrack 2009 was initially delayed to the Spring of 2010 due to time constraints, but as of November 2011, no further PuzzleCrack events have been held.

== Related ==
PuzzleCrunch is a similar, one-day puzzlehunt which has been run twice during the Spring. The competition was first run by Bert Johnson with Microsoft as a sponsor in 2006. It was last run by "The Big Enchilada" on April 26, 2008, with Amazon.com and Microsoft providing prizes.

== Past winners ==
| Event | Date | Winners | | |
| Event | Date | Placement | Team Name | Team Members |
|---|---|---|---|---|
| PuzzleHack | October 2002 | 1st | SIGMil | |
| PuzzleHack | October 2002 | 2nd | | |
| PuzzleHack | October 2002 | 3rd | | Andrew Badr |
| Puzzlehack 2.0 | October 2003 | 1st | Team Geekspotting | Dave Carlisle, Henry Goffin, Bert Johnson, James Laird |
| Puzzle~~hack~~ 3 | October 2004 | 1st | Team Geekspotting | Dave Carlisle, Henry Goffin, Bert Johnson, James Laird, Peter Schlichting |
| PuzzleCrack 2005 | October 2005 | 1st | | Jeff Huang, Ludvig Strigeus, Wes Henderson, and Teresa Karr |
| PuzzleCrack 2005 | October 2005 | 2nd | Team Florida | Matt Belcher, Kim Belcher, David Hwang, Erin Wolf, and Mike Treaster |
| PuzzleCrack 2005 | October 2005 | 3rd | SIGMil | |
| PuzzleCrack 2006 | October 2006 | 1st | The Big Enchilada | Kyle Harlow, Jason Monchino, Corinne Russell, Jared Russell, Jordan Timmermann, Derrick Wright |
| PuzzleCrack 2006 | October 2006 | 2nd | |4 | Jacob Beacham, Michael Almaraz |
| PuzzleCrack 2006 | October 2006 | 3rd | | Kevin Berg, Derek Donahue, and Nick Wagers |
| PuzzleCrack 2007 | October 2007 | 1st | Team Turtle | Bob Bregant, Jessica Bregant, and Hilary Wilson |
| PuzzleCrack 2007 | October 2007 | 2nd | The SoftwARR Pirates | Kevin Berg, Richard Carlson, Marc Holden |
| PuzzleCrack 2007 | October 2007 | 3rd | Team Spontoon | Greg Schechter, Stephen Kloder, Benjamin Juang, Marty Hanlon, Lauren Haynes, and Bo Zheng |
| PuzzleCrack 2008 | October 2008 | 1st (Tie) | Team Geekspotting | Vicki Bitters, Dave Carlisle, Joe Holzman, Bert Johnson, Toni Johnson |
| PuzzleCrack 2008 | October 2008 | 1st (Tie) | The Collective | Jared Suttles, Fred Fettinger, Patrick Auchter, Joe Swantek, Josh Ehlke, Alex Garfield, Mike Lombardi |
| PuzzleCrack 2008 | October 2008 | 3rd | The Discoverers + Atomic Falcon + AvonPaintball | Greg Schechter, Ryan Kagin, Dan Tan, Nir Friedman, J. Eggleston, David Nilosek, Geoff Carlson, Jack Tubbs |
