= ClueKeeper =

GPS location-aware software platform

Characteristics
- Contact: No
- Team members: 1+
- Mixed-sex: Yes
- Type: Outdoor
- Equipment: GPS receiver, Tablet or Smart phone
- Venue: Earth

Presence
- Olympic: No

ClueKeeper is a GPS location-aware software platform created by a group of puzzle lovers and initially released in 2013. It is an iOS and Android based app for building and playing puzzle hunts. It incorporates features of a puzzle hunt, an escape room, and augmented reality.

Creators can develop self-enclosed story files (called "hunts") that are read by the ClueKeeper app, which is installed on a GPS-enabled smartphone. The player and story take advantage of the location information provided by the GPS to trigger in-game events, such as using a virtual object, unlocking a puzzle, or interacting with characters. Completing a hunt can require going to different locations and solving puzzles. A typical ClueKeeper adventure is the Sunset Bar Crawl, created by San Francisco-based puzzle hunt company Shinteki, in which players are guided to several local pubs where they find clues and answer trivia questions.

Hunts can be either hosted or self-guided. The former are organized events in which teams compete at the same time. The latter are played individually or as a team, not at a set time but whenever they want to do the hunt. Some are designed by escape room companies to supplement their room-based games with outdoor, walking puzzle hunts in cities like Seattle, San Francisco, and Jersey City.

During the COVID-19 pandemic, social distancing rules and business lockdowns forced many escape rooms to close their doors temporarily. Some of them turned to ClueKeeper as a way to allow people to play puzzle-and-escape games without actually going inside an escape room. Some rooms held hosted games, where teams compete for prizes without coming into contact with each other. Others developed play-anytime games in which the players download a ClueKeeper app whose clues and puzzles lead the players to various locations. In some cases, puzzle developers were asked by city park and recreation departments or visitors bureaus to create ClueKeeper apps featuring local landmarks or facilities for the entertainment of locals and tourists.

ClueKeeper is used to run the annual international puzzle hunt for D.A.S.H, as well as hunts by companies such as Ravenchase, Shinteki and many others.

== See also ==
- Augmented reality
- Escape room
- Location-based game
- Munzee
- Pokémon Go
- Puzzlehunt
