= OpenTTD =

Open-source business simulation game

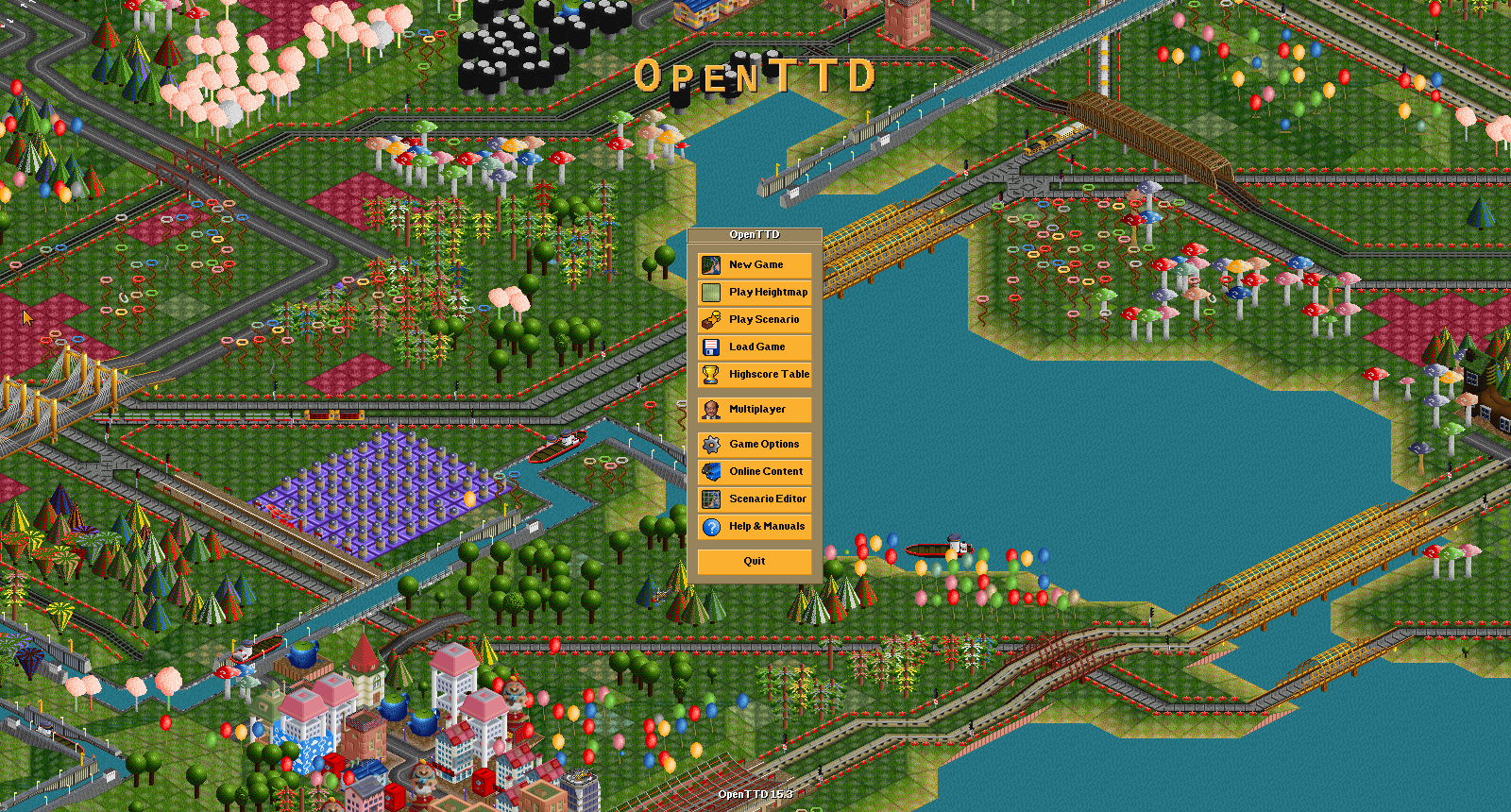
- Title screen from version 15.3 with the OpenGFX graphics set
- Original author: Ludvig Strigeus
- Developer: OpenTTD Team
- Release: 0.1 / 6 March 2004; 22 years ago
- Stable release: 15.3 / 4 April 2026
- Written in: C, C++, Objective-C, Squirrel
- Platform: Microsoft Windows; macOS; Android; Solaris; FreeBSD; Linux; OS/2; Haiku
- Type: Business simulation game
- License: GPL-2-0-only
- Website: www.openttd.org
- Repository: github.com/OpenTTD/OpenTTD

OpenTTD is a business simulation game in which players try to earn money by transporting passengers, minerals and goods via road, rail, water and air. It is an open-source remake and expansion of the 1995 Chris Sawyer video game Transport Tycoon Deluxe.

OpenTTD duplicates most features of Transport Tycoon Deluxe and has many additions, including a range of map sizes, support for many languages, custom (user-made) artificial intelligence (AI), downloadable customisations, ports for several widely used operating systems, and a more user-friendly interface. OpenTTD also supports local area network (LAN) and Internet multiplayer, co-operative and competitive, for up to 255 players.

OpenTTD is free and open-source software licensed under the GNU GPL-2-0-only and is under ongoing development. According to a study of the 61,154 open-source projects on SourceForge in the period between 1999 and 2005, OpenTTD ranked as the 8th most active open-source project to receive patches and contributions. In 2004, development moved to their own server.

Since 2018, the project has used GitHub for its source repository and bug tracker. The game was available on Steam as a separate download, until the original game was re-released on Steam and GOG.com on March 13, 2026.

== History ==
The development of OpenTTD was driven by the desire to extend the abilities of Transport Tycoon Deluxe to support user-made additions to the graphics and gameplay, as well as the desires of users to play the game on operating systems and computer architectures which the original game (released in 1994 for MS-DOS and programmed in assembly language) did not support.

=== Prior modifications to Transport Tycoon Deluxe ===
There was a prior attempt to modify Transport Tycoon Deluxe to run on more modern operating systems. OpenTTD was preceded by a commercial conversion of Transport Tycoon Deluxe to run on Windows 95. It was created in 1996 by the FISH technology group, but Nola released it 1999 as part of a compilation of older Tycoon games. This release was still greatly restricted in operating systems and computer architectures it could run on.

Similarly, there was an earlier success aiming to open Transport Tycoon Deluxe to modification by users. TTDPatch, initially created by Josef Drexler in 1996–97 and still being developed in 2010, changes the behaviour of Transport Tycoon Deluxe as it is running, to introduce many new features to the game, such as new graphics, vehicles, industries, etc. TTDPatch is restricted by the same operating system and computer architecture limits as Transport Tycoon Deluxe and has limited control over what features of the game can be altered.

=== Initial development of OpenTTD ===
In 2003, Ludvig Strigeus announced that he intended to reverse engineer Transport Tycoon Deluxe and convert the game to C. On March 6, 2004, this re-engineered Transport Tycoon Deluxe was released and named OpenTTD. As of 5 June 2025, OpenTTD is still under active development.

The early development of OpenTTD focused on restructuring the code to improve readability and extensibility. This allowed restoring features like sound and music, improving the user interface and introducing new languages for the GUI. Many new gameplay features and possibilities for user modification were also added around this time, aiming to replicate the abilities of TTDPatch. A major improvement was reprogramming multiplayer (network games) to use the Internet Protocol, allowing multiplayer gaming online and over modern LANs.

By the late 2000s, OpenTTD was a stable and popular game and development moved toward more substantial changes. 2007 saw the development of support for custom, user-made AIs, which can provide players with more of a challenge than the original AI. Other more major changes included introducing support for IPv6, an integrated download system for user-made customisations, and support for alternative base graphics, sound and music sets in 2009. Since 2007, OpenTTD is gradually being rewritten in C++.

=== Steam ===
Since March 12, 2026, after Atari purchased the rights to the original Transport Tycoon, OpenTTD is no longer free on Steam or GOG.com, however it is still publicly available for download from the developer's website for free.

== Gameplay ==
OpenTTD gameplay is very similar to Transport Tycoon Deluxe, on which it is based, although there are many improvements in both options within the game and ease of use. A player's aim is to build a transportation network using trucks, buses, trains, airplanes and boats to link together industries and towns on the map and transport the cargo they produce. Every time a vehicle makes a delivery of some cargo, players receive an income, allowing them to build more infrastructure (rails, stations, etc.), build more vehicles, modify the terrain, and interact with towns, via their local authorities. The default game runs from 1950 to 2050, during which a player aims to get as high a performance rating (based on number of vehicles, income, amount of cargo delivered, etc.) as possible.

Chart illustrating flow of commodities between industries and towns in Temperate scenarios in OpenTTD

The world map is dotted with both industries and towns. Cargo for transportation is supplied by both industries (e.g. the coal mine which produces coal) and towns (which produce passengers and mail) and accepted by other industries and/or towns according to their needs (e.g., the power station accepts coal). Placing a station near a source and a receiver of a certain cargo allows transportation between the two. The amount of cargo supplied by a town or industry depends on the quality of transport players provide to move its goods. Payment for delivering cargo depends on the quantity of cargo delivered, how fast it was delivered and how perishable it is. Some cargoes (e.g., passengers) must be delivered faster than others (e.g., coal) to earn a good income.

The introduction of the "Path Signal" to OpenTTD, in addition to the traditional "Block Signal" from the original Transport Tycoon, increases throughput of railway junction-crossing.

During the course of the game, players must build and expand their transport infrastructure. The only infrastructure present on the map at the start of the game are roads within towns (as well as seas and rivers which ships can utilise). All other infrastructure—ports, stations, airports, rail, canals, locks, aqueducts and depots—must be built by players. The tools for building a rail network are particularly powerful, and players have access to many different signal types to build a complex and interconnected rail network.

Technology improvements give players access to newer, faster and more powerful vehicles. For rail transport, new track technology also becomes available over time, first electrified rail, then monorail and maglev track. In general, newer vehicles cost more money to buy and run, and players must have earned enough money in earlier stages of the game to be able to afford to upgrade their vehicles. The full course of the default game, from 1950 to 2050, takes around 24 hours. Players can optionally start at earlier or later dates and play on past 2050, although no new technology becomes available.

OpenTTD can be played by one player, against a computer controlled AI, or by many players against each other, over a LAN or the Internet.

=== Multiplayer ===
OpenTTD supports multiplayer games for up to 255 players between 15 different transport companies, and can be played both over a LAN or over the Internet. Each transport company is in competition with each other transport company, and each transport company can be controlled by more than one player at any time. This allows both co-operative and competitive multiplayer games. Competitive team games (e.g. two transport companies, each controlled by three players) are also possible.

=== Modding ===
The game is also home to an active modding community, with community-made additions including new vehicles and scenarios. Additional changes to the open source code which modify core game mechanics ("patches") are also available.

== OpenMSX ==
OpenMSX is the default open source music set for the game. The music, composed by various OpenTTD community members, is described as old style blues and jazz. The OpenMSX Music is licensed under the GPL v2 license.

== Reception ==
OpenTTD has been praised for the number of improvements it has made to the original Transport Tycoon Deluxe, such as the AI, graphics, sounds, and ability to play multiplayer. OpenTTD received the most votes for Game of the Year for the 2004 Amiga Games Award. Lewis Denby from PC Gamer ranked OpenTTD 20th in its May 2011 list of best free PC games. Hungarian Unix Portal users chose OpenTTD as favourite (free) game in 2005, 2007, 2009, and 2010. In 2014 OpenTTD was named by PCGamer among the "Ten top fan remade classics you can play for free right now". In 2015 and 2016, Rock Paper Shotgun ranked OpenTTD 8th on its The 50 Best Free Games on PC list.

== See also ==
- List of free and open-source software packages
- List of open-source games
- OpenRCT2
- Simutrans
