= Maggie Roswell =

American actress

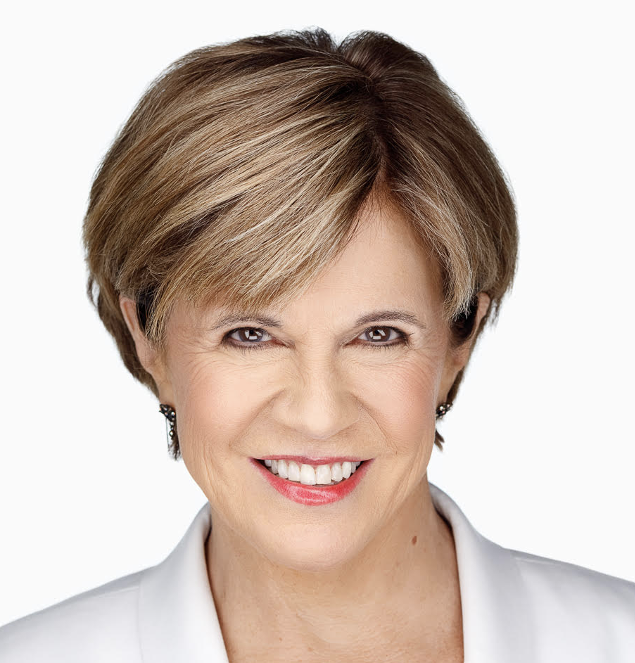
- Born: Los Angeles, California, U.S.
- Occupations: Actress; comedian; writer; producer
- Years active: 1973–present
- Spouse: Hal Rayle (m. 1987)
- Children: 1

Maggie Roswell is an American actress, comedian, writer and producer from Los Angeles, California. She is well known for her voice work on the Fox network animated television series The Simpsons, in which she has played recurring characters such as Maude Flanders, Helen Lovejoy, Miss Hoover, and Luann Van Houten, as well as several minor characters. This work has earned her an Annie Award nomination.

Roswell made her acting break-through in the 1980s with appearances in films such as Midnight Madness (1980), Lost in America (1985), and Pretty in Pink (1986), and guest appearances on television shows such as Remington Steele, Masquerade, and Happy Days. She appeared frequently in the sketch comedy The Tim Conway Show from 1980 to 1981, and did voice acting for a few animated films and television shows. Roswell also performed in some theater plays, including one in 1988 directed by Julia Sweeney.

In 1989, Roswell was hired for the first season of The Simpsons. She played a few minor characters until she became a regular cast member with the introduction of Maude Flanders in the second season. In 1994, Roswell and her husband Hal Rayle moved from Los Angeles to Denver to raise their daughter. Together they established the Roswell 'n' Rayle Company, creating and voicing advertisements for companies. Because of her move to Denver, Roswell had to travel to Los Angeles twice a week to tape The Simpsons. This ultimately led to her requesting a pay raise in 1999; however, Fox refused to offer her the amount she wanted so she quit the show. Roswell returned to The Simpsons in 2002 after reaching a deal to record her lines from her Denver home.

== Career ==
=== First acting work ===
Roswell was born and raised in Los Angeles, California. After going to Catholic school and Los Angeles City College, she began a career in acting. In the 1970s, she made some guest appearances on television shows such as M*A*S*H, but she did not gain her first big acting roles until the 1980s. In the 1980 film Midnight Madness, she played a character that leads a group of sorority sisters who are participating in a college puzzle solving race. Roswell also starred in the sketch comedy The Tim Conway Show in 1980 and 1981. She appeared in the film Lost in America (1985) as the character Patty, and she had a supporting role in the film Pretty in Pink (1986). She also acted in the two-part television film The Deliberate Stranger. In addition, Roswell played some minor roles in television shows in the 1980s and the beginning of the 1990s, including guest appearances on Remington Steele (1983), Masquerade (1984), Happy Days (1984), Murphy Brown (1993), and Quantum Leap (1993). She was offered a chance to replace Gilda Radner on Saturday Night Live, but turned down the offer when her agent told her "the show wasn't going anywhere."

Roswell has also worked on stage. In 1986 she appeared in improvisatory shows directed by Paul Sills at Lamb's Theatre, in which the actors were given characters and situations by the audience members. In 1988, she had a role in Julia Sweeney's play Mea's Big Apology at Groundling Theatre in Los Angeles. She played Eunice, a cynical woman who works at a malpractice insurance company and is a colleague to the main character. The company people do everything they can to dismiss her because they do not want to pay her retirement benefits, which are about to take effect. Roswell reprised this role in a 1992 revival of the play, also at Groundling Theatre.

=== Early The Simpsons, Roswell 'n' Rayle, pay dispute ===
In addition to her live action roles, Roswell did some voice acting in animated films and shows, including the voice of Teegra in Fire and Ice from 1983. This led to her being hired on the animated television series The Simpsons in 1989. Her first appearance was in the season one episode "Homer's Night Out", in which she voiced the character Princess Kashmir (a belly dancer who seduces Homer). Out of the total thirteen episodes of the first season, Roswell appeared in four; however, they were only minor roles. Roswell did not become a regular cast member until the middle of the second season in the episode "Dead Putting Society" (1990), with the introduction of Maude Flanders (neighbor to the Simpson family and the loving wife of Ned Flanders). Roswell went on to voice other recurring characters on the show, such as Helen Lovejoy (the reverend's wife), Miss Hoover (an elementary school teacher), and Luann Van Houten (the mother of Bart's best friend, Milhouse), as well as several more one-time characters and background characters. Fellow Simpsons cast member Nancy Cartwright wrote in her autobiography that "Maggie Roswell has been blessed with a skill in creating one of the hardest things to create: the 'normal sound,' whatever that is. So she can easily slip into the gal next door or any number of assorted reporters, medical students, jury members, accountants, scientists and moms."

Roswell was nominated for an Emmy Award for her work on The Simpsons. She also received a 1997 Annie Award nomination in the category "Best Individual Achievement: Voice Acting by a Female Performer in a TV Production" for her role as Shary Bobbins in the episode "Simpsoncalifragilisticexpiala(Annoyed Grunt)cious", but lost to June Foray.

Roswell began writing, producing, and/or voicing advertisements for companies. She and her spouse established "The Roswell 'n' Rayle Company" for this purpose, and built a recording studio in their basement. In 1994, they did radio advertisements in Denver for Burger King, Christy Sports, and an insect exhibit at the Museum of Natural History. The same year, Roswell provided her voice for Campbell's Soup and Pontiac commercials as part of their business. The company is still active as of 2010. They are now also providing comedic ring tones.

In 1997, Roswell appeared in the film Switchback alongside Danny Glover and Dennis Quaid.

Roswell left The Simpsons in spring 1999 after a pay dispute with Fox Broadcasting Company, which airs The Simpsons. The dispute was not revealed to the press at first; Fox originally reported that she decided to quit only because she was tired of flying between Denver and Los Angeles for the recording sessions. Then Roswell announced that she had asked for a raise, not only because she was tired of the traveling, but because of the increasing cost of flight tickets. Roswell was paid $1,500 to $2,000 per episode during the three seasons before she left, and she asked Fox for a raise to $6,000 per episode. However, Fox only offered her a $150 raise, which did not even cover the travel costs, so she decided to quit. She told The Denver Post that "they offered me a $150 raise. I mean, that's lint in Fox's pocket. But Fox wanted to prove a point, I guess. I was flying myself back and forth from Denver to L.A. It was exhausting. I loved doing the show and they thought that I would come back. But now I'm busy doing other things." She further added that "I was part of the backbone of The Simpsons and I don't think the money I asked for was exorbitant. I wasn't asking for what other cast members make. I was just trying to recoup all the costs I had in travel. If they'd flown me in, I'd still be working." At that point, the six main cast members of the show were paid $125,000 per episode. As a result of Roswell's departure, Marcia Mitzman Gaven was hired to voice her characters, with Maude Flanders killed off in the episode "Alone Again, Natura-Diddily".

=== Return to The Simpsons and later work ===
Roswell returned to The Simpsons in 2002 in the season premiere of the fourteenth season, in which Maude made an appearance as a ghost. She reached a deal with Fox to record her lines from her Denver home, the dispute ended, and Roswell has remained on the show. She also appeared as Helen Lovejoy in the film The Simpsons Movie (2007). She attended the gala premiere together with her daughter, who was fourteen years old at the time. Roswell told The Denver Post that she was surprised she was given two tickets; "Everybody in Hollywood is killing to get their kid there. My daughter's big thrill is to meet [the band] Green Day," which also appeared in the film.

In 2004, Roswell had a minor role in the film Silver City. In 2009, she starred in the play Bunny Bunny: Gilda Radner, a Sort of Romantic Comedy at Avenue Theater in Denver. It opened in May of that year. The play recounted events in the career of actress Gilda Radner, who Roswell played, from 1975 (the start of Saturday Night Live) to her death in 1989.

Roswell enjoys singing. On February 7, 1999, she debuted as a nightclub singer at the Denver Chop House & Brewery, where she performed on behalf of the homelessness charity Family Homestead. In June 2003, she sang at Denver's Rattlebrain Theatre on Sunday nights with The Sirens.

== Personal life ==
Roswell met fellow voice actor Hal Rayle in 1986, and they married in 1987. He had done roles such as the Predator in Predator 2, the ghoulies in Ghoulies II, and Marvin the Martian in Air Jordan commercials. They moved from Los Angeles to Denver, Colorado, in June 1994 to raise their adopted daughter, who was born in 1993. They own and operate a voiceover studio, AudioRnR, near their home in Burbank, California.

Between March and November every year, when episodes of The Simpsons were being recorded, Roswell had to fly back to Los Angeles twice a week to attend the table reads and the recording sessions. In an article about her and her husband's move, Ricky Lopes of Rocky Mountain News wrote: "When The Simpsons is taping, she goes to Los Angeles every Friday morning for the first reading, flies back that afternoon, flies back Sunday to tape the show Monday and flies back home that night." Roswell said she "got the idea for the way Helen Lovejoy says 'B-bye, b-bye, b-bye,' to everyone when they leave the church from the way the flight attendants say it when you get off the plane."

== Filmography ==
=== Films ===
Year	Film	Role	Notes
1980	Midnight Madness	Donna	
1983	Fire and Ice	Teegra (voice)	
1985	Lost in America	Patty	
1986	Pretty in Pink	Mrs. Dietz	
1992	Cool World	Additional voices	Uncredited
1993	Nose Dive	Ellen	
1994	I'll Do Anything	Auditioning Woman	Deleted Scene
1995	Adventures in Odyssey: Go West Young Man	Miss Lilly (voice)	Direct-to-video
1995	The Pebble and the Penguin	Additional voices	Uncredited
1996	Rotten Ralph	Mom (voice)	Direct-to-video
1997	Switchback	Fae	
2004	Silver City	Ellie Hastings	
2007	The Simpsons Movie	Helen Lovejoy (voice)	Cameo
2024	May the 12th Be with You	Mary Poppins (voice)	Short Film

=== Television ===
Year	Series	Role	Notes
1973	Love, American Style	Jane	Episode: "Love and the Secret Spouse"
1973	M*A*S*H	Sister Theresa	Episode: "Kim"
1973	The Partridge Family	Lois	Episode: "Heartbreak Keith"
1978	Piper's Pets	Dr. Piper's Wife	Television pilot
1980–1981	The Tim Conway Show	Various Roles	Sketch comedy
1980	Characters	Carol Goodman	Television pilot
1981	And They All Lived Happily After	Lorraine Hofstedter	Television film
1981	Mork & Mindy	Donna Hammond	Episode: "Three the Hard Way"
1982	Laverne & Shirley	Karen Caldwell	Episode: "Life Is the Tar Pits"
1982	Deadly Alliance	Mrs. Trenton	Television Film
1982	Insight	Karen	Episode: "For Love or Money"
1983	Remington Steele	Margaret "Hoop" Tracy	Episode: "Steele in the News"
1984	Masquerade	Julie Moon	Episode: "Five Days"
1984	Happy Days	Joyce James	Episode: "Fonzie Moves Out"
1985	Comedy Break	Various Roles	Sketch Comedy
1986	New Love, American Style	Katy	Episode: "Love and the Judge"
1986	The Deliberate Stranger	Detective Kathy McCeshney	Television Miniseries
1987	Valerie	Ranger Morrison	Episode: "Babes in the Woods"
1987–1988	Mighty Mouse: The New Adventures	Pearl Pureheart (voice)	Main Role
1987	Popeye and Son	Jewelry Store Clerk (voice)	Episode: "Junior Gets a Job"
1987	Dynasty	Penelope Shane	Episode: "The Testing"
1988	Jake and the Fatman	Vivian Scully	Episode: "What Is This Thing Called Love?"
1988–1991	A Pup Named Scooby-Doo	Barbara Simone, Mrs. Morganson (voice)	3 Episodes
1988	The Adventures of Raggedy Ann and Andy	Trickle (voice)	Episode: "The Megamite Adventure"
1988	Yogi and the Invasion of the Space Bears	Little Girl (voice)	Animated television film
1989	Hunter	Adelle Roberts	Episode: "Shoot to Kill"
1989	Teenage Mutant Ninja Turtles	Caitlyn (voice)	Episode: "The Great Boldini"
1989	The Tracey Ullman Show	Jenny	Episode: "The Holland Tunnel of Love"
1990–1999; 2002–present	The Simpsons	Maude Flanders, Helen Lovejoy, Luann Van Houten, Miss Hoover and additional voices	290 Episodes
1990	Bobby's World	Bank Teller (voice)	Episode: "My Dad Can Fix Anything"
1990	Tiny Toon Adventures	Mary Vain (voice)	Episode: "Hollywood Plucky"
1991	L.A. Law	Ms. Shore	Episode: "Rest in Pieces"
1991	TaleSpin	Female Employee, Sally (voice)	Episode: "Mach One for the Gipper"
1991	Night Rap	Various Roles	Sketch Comedy
1991	Guns of Paradise	Caroline Dryer	Episode: "Twenty-Four Hours"
1991	Bad Attitudes	Angela's mother	Television film
1991	Darkwing Duck	Female superhero, News Reporter (voice)	2 Episodes
1992	Grave Secrets: The Legacy of Hilltop Drive	Rita Marshall	Television film
1992	Great Scott!	Mrs. Stone	Episode: "Stone Moan"
1993	Quantum Leap	Masterson	Episode: "Revenge of the Evil Leaper"
1993	Good Advice	Betsy Miller	Episode: "Pilot"
1993	Murphy Brown	Mother #2	Episode: "The Egg & I"
1993	Bonkers	Anita the Hairdresser (voice)	2 Episodes
1993	The All-New Dennis the Menace	Woodhead Way Pet Obedience School Instructor, Michelle the Babysitter (voice)	Episode: "Like Master, Like Mutt"
1994	Animaniacs	Princess of Props (voice)	Episode: "Baloney & Kids"
1997	Animal Tales	Multiple Voices (Main Cast)	PBS Television Series
1998	Venus on the Hard Drive	Venus (voice)	Television Pilot

=== Video games ===
Year	Game	Role
1995	Labyrinth of Crete	Hestia
1997	The Simpsons: Virtual Springfield	Maude Flanders, Miss Hoover
1997	Galapagos: Mendel's Escape	Computer System
