= Microsoft Puzzle Hunt =

Annual game for Microsoft employees

The Microsoft Puzzlehunt is a quasi-annual Microsoft tradition started in 1999. It is a puzzlehunt in the same vein as the MIT Mystery Hunt and has some similarity to The Game. The hunt is a team puzzle competition which challenges each team to solve a large number of original puzzles of all different kinds. The answers, when used in conjunction with the metapuzzle, lead to a hidden treasure concealed somewhere on the Microsoft campus. Teams spend the weekend solving original and unique puzzles, usually created by the team that won the last hunt. Puzzles may be anything from traditional puzzles like crosswords, word searches, cryptograms, jigsaw puzzles, word play and logic problems to wandering around campus to find landmarks or puzzles that have to be solved on location. Microsoft Puzzlehunt was founded by Bruce Leban, along with Roy Leban and Gordon Dow.

The Microsoft Puzzlehunt takes place over a weekend at the Microsoft campus in Redmond, Washington, usually lasting approximately 31 hours from beginning to end. In general, teams are no larger than 12, at least 4 must be current Microsoft employees, and at least 6 must be current or former employees.

Microsoft has a rich tradition of puzzle events, including Microsoft Puzzle Safari, College Puzzle Challenge, Microsoft Intern Puzzleday and Microsoft Iron Puzzler, but Microsoft Puzzlehunt remains the "main event" for puzzle solvers in the Microsoft community.

== External resources ==
- A list of Microsoft puzzlehunts
- Puzzlehunt II
- Puzzlehunt 23 (Puzzle University)
- Puget Sound Business Journal article
