= Mathew Laibowitz =

- Citizenship: United States
- Scientific career
- Fields: Media Arts and Sciences
- Workplaces: Futuruption LLC, Megafauna LLC
- Doctoral advisor: Prof. Joseph A. Paradiso

Mat Laibowitz is an inventor, artist, and product designer. He holds a PhD degree from MIT Media Lab's Program in Media Arts and Sciences from the Responsive Environments Group under Prof. Joseph A. Paradiso. He founded in 1996 an urban experience named Midnight Madness after the 1980 film of the same name, Midnight Madness (film). Midnight Madness was regarded as igniting the large scale urban game scene in NYC, including elements of the Come Out and Play festival. In its original incarnation, Midnight Madness ran for its final time in 2007, at which time more than 2000 people have participated throughout its 11-year history. Midnight Madness and Laibowitz were the subjects of a chapter in David Rakoff's book, Don't Get Too Comfortable.

As a product designer, Laibowitz has brought over 30 products to market including toys, home automation devices, and lighting.

As an inventor and a researcher, his most known work includes Parasitic Mobility – a distributed sensor networks employing mobile sensing nodes that are carried to desired locations by attaching themselves to moving hosts, and Spinner (MIT Media Lab), a research platform designed to investigate the use of a distributed video camera network and wearable sensors to create cohesive narrative videos from our physical and social behavior. He held the position of Principal Researcher at Nokia Research Center Hollywood, where he investigated new forms of entertainment using activated physical environments.

As a mixed-media artist he has shown work at many international venues including Exit Art, Fellisimo House of Design, Ars Electronica, Jack Lenor Larsen's Longhouse, and at the MIT Museum. He formerly composed and performed music as part of the band Brazilian Pizza Mafia, who performed at the South By Southwest music festival in 1998, and as a solo artist under the name hazmat and performed at NYC's The Limelight in 2000.

In September 2011, Laibowitz left Nokia Research to become an independent innovator of art, entertainment, and physically interactive new media.

In January 2012, Laibowitz founded Futuruption Research and Development, a small company specializing in the design, development, and deployment of first-of-a-kind products, systems, activated environments, and events for entertainment, education, awareness, health, and productivity. Futuruption, with the support of Elisha Wiesel/Goldman Gives and in collaboration with Linked by Air and Insider NYC, brought back Midnight Madness as a charity fund raising event. The first three of these events in 2012, 2013, and 2015 raised over $7,000,000 for charity, and the event has continued to raise money with a successful franchised event in 2017 and an upcoming version in London in 2018.

In 2014, Laibowitz and the Futuruption team, created the global puzzle hunt that started in the New York Times Bestselling novel, Endgame: The Calling, working closely with the book's authors James Frey and Nils Sheldon-Johnson, the content of the novel unlocked 3D virtual rooms and a series of challenges leading to the key that awarded $500000 in gold. Competitors in over 100 countries attempted to win the gold, working on the puzzles until the prize was claimed 11 months after it started.

As of H2 2019, Dr. Laibowitz holds the position of Executive Vice-President at 3Blackdot (website), a creator of multi-platform interactive and traditional entertainment including the feature film Queen & Slim, the MMO video game Misbits, and the upcoming 360 media project Eli Roth's Clownpocalypse.

Mat Laibowitz is currently contributing to the development of a 3-picture deal with Eli Roth, 50 Cent, and James Frey.

In 2021, Dr. Laibowitz became a co-founder of the startup Candy Digital Inc (website) and serves as CTO and CXO leading teams that have developed cutting-edge products and activations using licensed IP such as from MLB, Netflix, DC Comics/WBD, Nascar, and WWE. Mat Laibowitz lead the development of a first of its kind discovery game for the tv show Stranger Things which won a Webby Award honor. Dr. Laibowitz helped grow Candy Digital from 5 employees to 150 employees and through multiple raises.
