= System's Twilight =

1994 video game

- System's Twilight application icon
- Publisher: Self-published
- Designer: Andrew Plotkin
- Platform: Mac OS
- Release: October 8, 1994; 31 years ago
- Genre: Interactive fiction
- Mode: Single player

System's Twilight: An Abstract Fairy Tale is a graphical interactive fiction computer game created by Andrew Plotkin and released in 1994.

== Summary ==
An early in-game puzzle. The characters are depicted as abstract shapes.

The game is a combination of puzzle and story, combining several different kinds of logic puzzles and word puzzles. The puzzles include variations of Set, Black Box, and Sokoban, as well as many others. The overarching story is an allegory in which the player and other characters are programs in a broken, dysfunctional computer environment.

Originally, Plotkin released System's Twilight as shareware. Since 2000, it has been re-released as binary-only freeware. It runs only in the Mac OS Classic environment, but can be run in emulation on other platforms.

== Reception ==
MacAddict commented that System's Twilight felt similar to 3 in Three, with hard puzzles, quality sound and graphics, and a witty storyline. Inside Mac Games rated the game four out of five, and also noted the game's similarity to 3 in Three, saying it took "the genre of Cliff Johnson game [...] to new heights." Inside Mac Games called the game "very well crafted in all aspects": the story is involved and complex and the puzzles are clever and original. The review also praised the interface, graphics, and sound.

Adventure Gamers felt that System's Twilight improved on "Cliff Johnson’s metapuzzle adventures" by adding "some much-needed nonlinearity as well as a stronger narrative." The game "synthesizes abstract puzzle-solving into an adventure game to great effect", with an ending that is rewarding "in terms of both adventuring and puzzle-solving."

AllGame rated System's Twilight three and a half out of five stars, calling it "a very unusual game" with an ending that was "something of a letdown", and suggesting that it would appeal to people who like hard puzzles. For the AllGame reviewer, the graphics were average while the weird and amusing sounds complemented the gameplay.
