= TMOU =

TMOU (in Czech tmou means through the darkness) is a logic, strategic, team, interactive, outdoor and night puzzlehunt game held in Brno, Czech Republic. It is held annually at the beginning of November. About 200 teams of up to five players each compete. The duration of the game is between 17 and 20 hours, traditionally beginning on Friday at dusk and closing by Saturday noon.

The game has a simple scheme—a linear sequence of an a priori unknown number of secret sites (usually about 15). The place and time of the beginning of the game is announced in advance. Here the teams can solve the first puzzle. The solution of the puzzle found at each site reveals the position of next site. The final task usually tests the cooperation within the team. The first team that solves all puzzles and the final task becomes the winner and is rewarded by immense fame and recognition in the community and a symbolic prize (official T-shirts). Most years no more than 5 teams finish the game with some years having no winner at all.

The puzzles are very diverse, the only common feature is that they require logical thinking. The players may face simple substitution and transposition ciphers, steganography, graphic and multimedia ciphers, object with a clue hidden inside that must be destroyed, and more. As the years go and numerous experienced teams return to the game many times, the puzzles, especially those later through the game, tend to depart from the traditional schemes and feature very original principles and lines of thought, devised just for the occasion.

The advance through the game is hardened by the early November night conditions; players must be able to remain fully focused regardless of sleepiness, dark, cold, and low mood. Starting at about one third of the way the game leaves the urban area meaning there is no more place to hide indoors in case of rain or snow. No hints are given to the solutions upon request so a team can easily find itself stuck at a site for several hours. For emergency cases there is a game-leaving envelope containing instructions how to get to safety.

The players are encouraged to cooperate within a team but inter-team collaboration is forbidden. The players can move by walk and by the means of public transportation, but use of any other means including taxi, own cars, even bicycle or in-lines, is not allowed. Teams can use any available map and compass for navigation and cell phones (but not radio stations) for communication.

TMOU is organized by Instruktoři Brno—an informal group focusing on outdoor and experiential education. Since 2000 TMOU has inspired many other similar games in Czech Republic and beyond, e.g.,

- Bedna in Prague
- Osud in Zlín
- Brieždenie in Bratislava (Slovakia)
- Nachtschicht in Dortmund (Germany)

At the moment, there community of outdoor puzzlehunt players counts several thousands in the Czech Republic, which has a population of 10 million people.
