= Black Box (game) =

Abstract board game

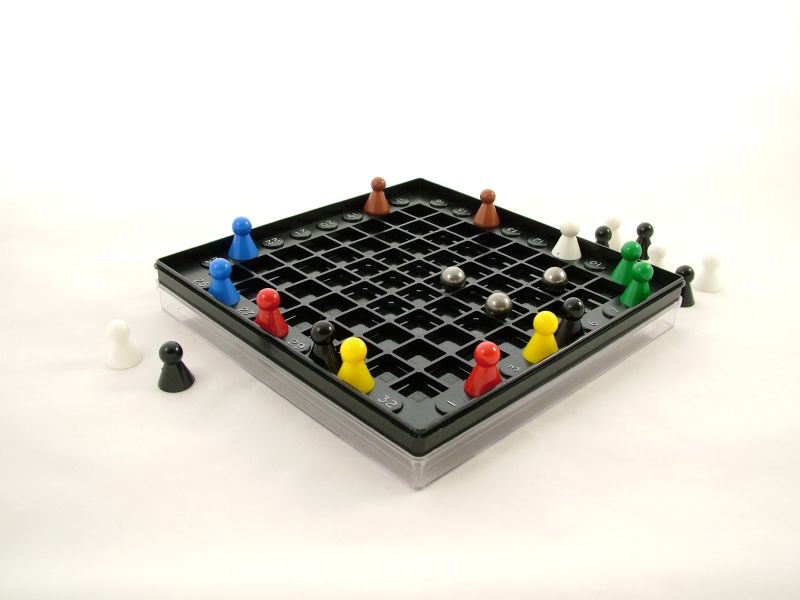
Black Box gameboard and pieces

Black Box is an abstract board game for one or two players, which simulates shooting rays into a black box to deduce the locations of "atoms" hidden inside. It was created by Eric Solomon. The board game was published by Waddingtons from the mid-1970s and by Parker Brothers in the late 1970s. The game can also be played with pen and paper, and there are numerous computer implementations for many different platforms, including one which can be run from the Emacs text editor.

Black Box was inspired by the work of Godfrey Hounsfield who was awarded the 1979 Nobel Prize in Medicine for his invention of the CAT scanner.

== Objective ==
Black Box is played on a two-dimensional grid. The object of the game is to discover the location of objects ("atoms", represented by metal balls in the Waddingtons game and by yellow balls in the Parker Brothers version) hidden within the grid, by the use of the minimum number of probes ("rays"). The atoms are hidden by a person in a two-player game. In a solitaire game, they are either hidden by a computer or they are pre-hidden; in this case, the results of various probes are resolved by looking them up in a book. The seeker designates where the ray enters the black box and the hider (or computer or book) announces the result (a "hit", "reflection", or "detour"/"miss"). This result is marked by the seeker, who uses these to deduce the position of the atoms in the black box.

== Rules ==

The most common configuration for novice players is four atoms in an 8×8 grid. At left is a sample black box in this configuration.

There are 32 input positions in an 8×8 grid, eight each at the top, bottom, right, and left. A beam is "fired" into one of these positions and the result is used to help deduce the location of a known number of hidden atoms.

=== Hit ===
Atoms interact with rays in three ways. A direct impact on an atom by a ray is a "hit". Thus, ray 1 fired into the box configuration at left strikes an atom directly, generating a "hit", designated by an "H". A ray which hits an atom does not emerge from the box.

=== Deflection ===
The interaction resulting from a ray which does not actually hit an atom, but which passes directly to one side of the ball is called a "deflection". The angle of deflection for this ray/atom interaction is 90 degrees. Ray 2 is deflected by the atom at left, exiting the box as shown.

=== Reflection ===
The final type of interaction of a ray with an atom is a "reflection", designated by an "R". This occurs in two circumstances. If an atom is at the edge of the grid, any ray which is aimed into the grid directly beside it causes a reflection.

Rays 3 and 4 at left would each generate a reflection, due to the atom at the edge. Ray 5 would be a hit on the atom.

=== Double deflection ===
The other circumstance leading to a reflection is when two deflections cancel out. In the grid at left, ray 6 results in a reflection due to its interaction with the atoms in the grid.

=== Miss ===
There are also misses. Ray 7 at left, for instance, interacts with no atoms in the grid.

=== Detour ===
Rays that do not result in hits or reflections are called "detours". These may be single or multiple deflections, or misses. A detour has an entry and an exit location, while hits and reflections only have an entry location for a hit, and a single entry/exit location for a reflection.

Of course, more complex situations result when these behaviors interact. Ray 8 results in two deflections, as does ray 9.

Some rays travel a twisted course, like ray 1 at left.

Notice that this complex set of five deflections above looks exactly like a single deflection, as shown by ray 2 at left. Things are not always as simple as they seem within a black box.

Reflections and hits can be more complex, too. Ray 2 gets deflected by the first atom, reflected by the next two atoms and again deflected by the original atom, yielding a reflection.

Ray 3 below gets deflected by the first atom, then by the second atom, and then hits the third atom, yielding a hit.

The complete set of interactions of rays with the original sample black box is shown at left. Note that for detours, the input and output locations are interchangeable - it does not matter if ray 2 below enters the box from the left side, or the top.

== Scoring ==
Each entry and exit location counts as a point. Hits and reflections therefore cost one point, while detours cost two points. When the seeker guesses the location of the atoms in the grid, each misidentified atom position costs penalty points: ten in the original Waddingtons rules, five in the Parker Brothers version and most computer editions.

Different atom positions lead to different average scores - a very easy four-ball game might average eight or nine points to solve, while a very hard game might average 18 points.

== Variants ==

The most common variant of Black Box is played on an 8×8 grid with five (or more) atoms. Five-atom configurations allow for positions that cannot be unambiguously determined by probes. The grid at left shows an example of this.

If the fifth atom is in any of the four positions marked by the X, no ray can ever determine where it is located, because it is shielded from all directions by the surrounding atoms. The addition of more atoms allows for more complex indeterminate configurations, but also allows for more intriguing interactions.

It is possible to "hide" a ball with this four-atom configuration.

It is not ambiguous, however.

Black Box can also be played with different-sized grids, such as 10×10 or 12×12 grids.

A related class of computer puzzle games feature different types of obstacles concealed in the box, which affect rays in varying ways — such as mirrors which reflect only a direct-hit ray, or prisms which split one ray into two. The GNOME game GFingerPoken and one section of the Macintosh game System's Twilight fall into this class.

== Video game ==
A version of the game was created for the BBC Micro home computer by Ben Finn (who would go on to co-write Sibelius) and published (along with Gambit by the Oliver Twins) by Acornsoft in 1984.

In 1985, a version compatible with ZX81 BASIC, was published by Agesandro Corrêa in Microhobby #19, a Brazilian magazine computer

== Reviews ==
- Games #8
- Jeux & Stratégie #6
- Family Games: The 100 Best

== See also ==
A faithful version of Black Box is available in the MMO game Rift_(video_game), as the zone puzzle for the Morban zone in the Dusken continent.

== Sources ==
- Black Box: Rules and Solitaire Games (instruction manual), Parker Brothers, 1978
- F. Thomas May, blackbox.el - Lisp source code for GNU Emacs implementation of Black Box, 1985
- Pritchard, D. B. (1982). "Black Box". Brain Games. Penguin Books Ltd. pp. 30–37. ISBN 0-14-00-5682-3.
