= Flavor text =

Feature of fiction, especially video games

Flavor text is text for action figure character backgrounds, video games, playing cards, or within the pages of a role-playing game's rulebook. While appropriate to the product's or game's story concept, it usually has no effect on the mechanics of the game, but instead serves to add realism, characterization, or lore to the item in question. Flavor text is often the last text on a card or on the rear of a toy card or package, and is usually printed in italics or written between quotes to distinguish it from game-affecting text.

== Background ==
The concept of flavor text was popularized by the dossiers of 1980s toys, primarily G.I. Joe file cards and Transformers tech-specs, but is now more commonly associated with tabletop games. The term flavor text was originally coined in March 1993 for Magic: The Gathering by the game's production manager, Dave Howell.

== Format ==
In most cases, the flavor text attempts to add depth or background to the item, providing a form of context. This helps to establish the universe to which the item belongs.

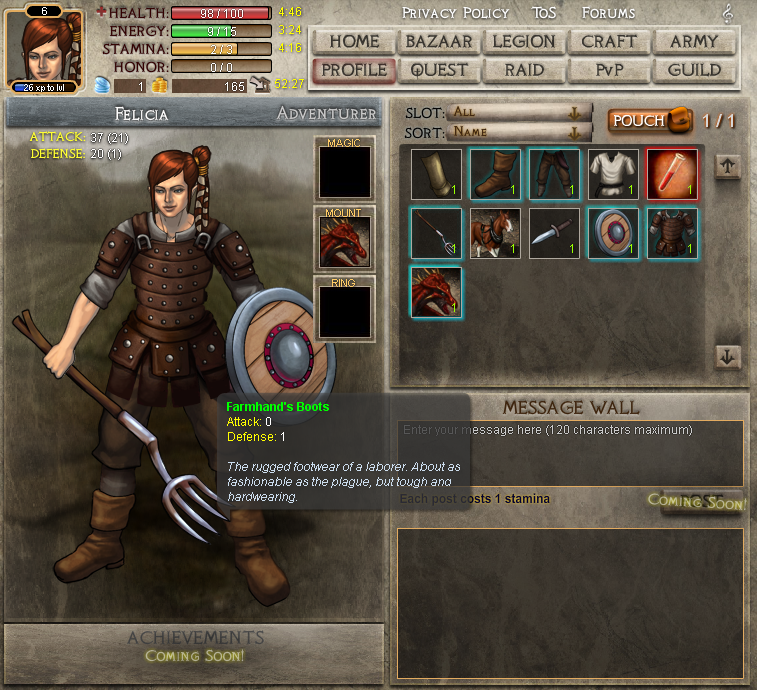
Flavor text in video games can be a way to add world building through the items the player uses.

Flavor text can also be a quotation, such as from related media (e.g., Star Wars movie quotes on a Star Wars card) or from literature. Some Magic: The Gathering cards' flavor text comes from public domain sources such as Shakespeare's plays and poetry.

A unique spin on flavor text in a card game can be seen in the long-lived Star Wars Customizable Card Game. Many cards with flavor text also include special keywords (such as Spy, Hologram, or Bounty Hunter) that can be spotted by other cards for bonuses or penalties. The flavor text on character cards is also one of the few ways of distinguishing that character's species (which is an important factor in most decks). The video game series Borderlands contains weapons and other items with flavor text which hint to the item's hidden ability, such as restoring health equal to damage output.

== In puzzles ==
The term "flavor text" may also refer to a blurb describing or offering clues to a puzzle. This is most frequently seen in puzzles which are non-traditional, lacking literal instructions on how to solve them. Part of the challenge for such puzzles is determining the solving method, which is often non-obvious and can involve cutting and folding paper, deciphering shapes or patterns using braille or Morse code, substituting rhyming words, etc. The flavor text for such puzzles, unlike the flavor text for card games, often provides crucial hints at the approach to take. The hints may be thickly veiled, but can not easily be ignored.

A common and well-known occurrence of flavor text in the context of puzzles is the title of crosswords. Most crosswords have a theme, and the title often hints at what the theme is. The puzzle can be solved without figuring out the theme, but knowing the theme often expedites the solving process.

== See also ==
- Epigraph (literature)
- National Puzzlers' League
- Puzzle hunt
