= Hipparchus star catalog =

Ancient astronomical map by Hipparchus

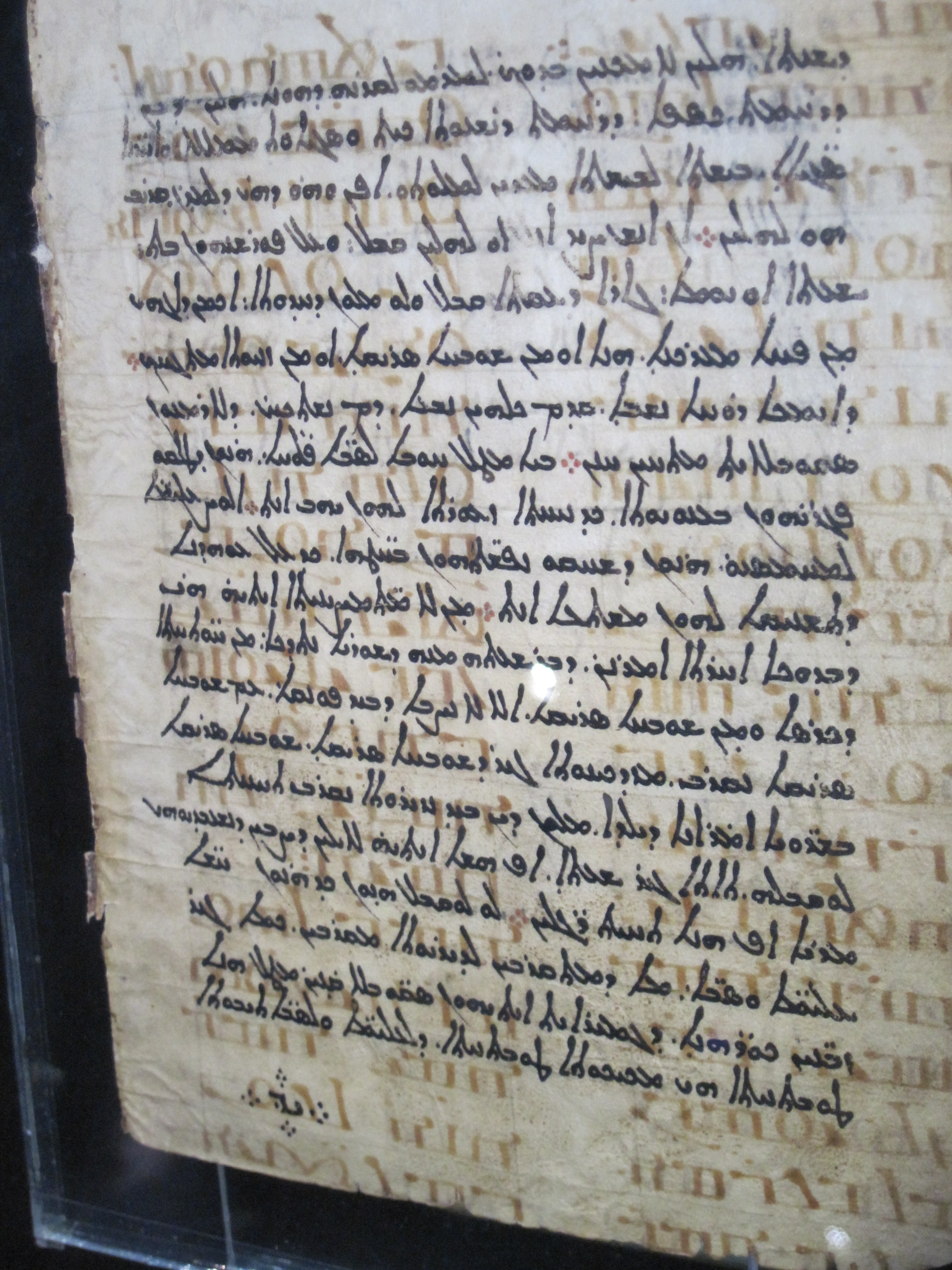
A folio from the Codex Climaci Rescriptus

The Hipparchus star catalog is a list of at least 850 stars that also contained coordinates of stellar positions in the sky, based on celestial equatorial latitude and longitude. According to British classicist Thomas Heath, Hipparchus was the first to employ such a method to map the stars, at least in the West. Hipparchus is also credited with creating a celestial globe, although this object is not known to be extant. The catalog was lost to history, until parts of it were rediscovered in 2022 in the Codex Climaci Rescriptus, an ancient palimpsest found in Saint Catherine's Monastery on Mount Sinai.

== Rediscovery ==
Contrary to Ptolemy's later star catalogue, which has survived in the Almagest and the Handy Tables, there was little evidence of the material presence, and content of the star catalog of Hipparchus. The Commentary on the Phaenomena, his sole surviving work, discusses earlier works on positional astronomy by Eudoxus of Cnidus and Aratus of Soli. Only a few references by authors after Hipparchus reflect stellar coordinates; these are mostly found in the work of Aratus.

During a multispectral image survey of the ancient Greek palimpsest known as the Codex Climaci Rescriptus in 2012, Jamie Klair, then an undergraduate student at Cambridge University, noticed that some of the folios' undertext had an astronomical nature. The folios of the Codex had been erased by the ninth or tenth century, and were reused to write Syriac translations of texts by John Climacus, a sixth century Chrisitan monk. Researchers believe that other palimpsests in Saint Catherine's Monastery of the Mount Sinai, where the Codex Climaci Rescriptus was found, may contain more fragments of the star catalog.

In 2021, Peter Williams made the first observation of the existence of astronomical measurements. Folios 47–54 and 64 of the palimpsest were originally part of an old codex that contained Aratus' Phaenomena and related writings, which were dated to the fifth or sixth century CE based on palaeographic evidence.

== Modern references ==
Hipparchus is referenced in the name and acronym of the European Space Agency' scientific satellite "Hipparcos" (for HIgh Precision PARallax COllecting Satellite). The satellite that was launched in August 1989; it successfully monitored the celestial sphere for 3.5 years before it stopped operating in March 1993. The "Hipparcos Catalogue", which contains 118,218 stars with the maximum level of precision documented, was created using calculations from observations by the primary instrument.
