= Midnight Madness (1980 film) =

1980 comedy film by Michael Nankin and David Wechter

- Poster for Midnight Madness
- Directed by: Michael Nankin; David Wechter
- Written by: Michael Nankin; David Wechter
- Produced by: Ron Miller
- Starring: David Naughton; Debra Clinger; Eddie Deezen; Brad Wilkin; Maggie Roswell; Stephen Furst
- Cinematography: Frank V. Phillips
- Edited by: Norman R. Palmer; Jack Sekely
- Music by: Julius Wechter
- Production company: Walt Disney Productions (uncredited)
- Distributed by: Buena Vista Distribution
- Release date: February 8, 1980
- Running time: 112 minutes
- Country: United States
- Language: English
- Budget: $4.5 million
- Box office: $2.9 million

Midnight Madness is a 1980 American comedy film produced by Walt Disney Productions and starring David Naughton in his film debut, Debra Clinger, Eddie Deezen, Brad Wilkin, Maggie Roswell and Stephen Furst.

The city of Los Angeles is the game board as five teams of college students attempt to win "The Great All-Nighter", a dusk-to-dawn competition dreamed up by an eccentric graduate student. Adam (David Naughton) and Harold (Stephen Furst) are paired with a grab-bag group of fellow students including Scott (Michael J. Fox, in his first film appearance). The film was directed and written by Michael Nankin and David Wechter, based on real life events as reported in the Los Angeles Times.

== Plot ==
Graduate student Leon (Alan Solomon) summons five college students to his apartment and challenges them to participate in his latest game creation, The Great All-Nighter. He tells them about his game and instructs them to form teams. At first, the leaders refuse to play, but rivalries between them lead all five to change their minds by the game's start time – a scenario Leon has already predicted based on his extensive planning.

Leon, as game master, keeps track of the teams' locations with a giant map, and various radio equipment. The teams are supposed to call and check in at each clue (though many of the teams end up skipping at least one location).

The adventures of the other three teams are subplots, as well as the situation at Leon's apartment ("Game Control"). Here, along with his female assistants Candy and Sunshine (Debi Richter and Kirsten Baker), Leon monitors the progress of the game. Already unpopular with his landlady, Mrs. Grimhaus (Irene Tedrow), for the amount of noise he makes, Leon faces eviction if any of the other tenants complain. Several of them do show up to complain, but as Leon explains the mechanics of the game to them, they become fascinated with it and help run it, much to the annoyance of Grimhaus.

The game culminates in a race-to-the-finish at the Westin Bonaventure Hotel where the yellow team ultimately prevails and wins the game. A huge party consisting of all contestants and game control follows.

=== Teams ===
Teams are made up of characters who are broad stereotypes. They wear matching sweatshirts, and ride in vehicles that also match their team color.

- The members of the Yellow Team are friendly and kind; they play fair and are the main heroes of the film. The yellow team are led by the protagonist Adam (Naughton). Partway through the game, they add a member, Adam's troubled younger brother Scott (Michael J. Fox, in his first movie), who acts out to get Adam's attention. They also force the shy Flynch (Joel Kenney), whom Adam has been counseling, to play the game rather than go on a date with an unattractive girl. Also on the team are Adam's love interest Laura (Debra Clinger) and friend Marvin (David Damas). The team vehicle, owned by Marvin, is often referred to as a Jeep but is actually a J40 Land Cruiser.
- The members of the Blue Team are selfish and rude individuals who cheat at every opportunity and are the main antagonists. They are led by overweight snob and main antagonist Harold (Stephen Furst), who is intensely jealous of the popular Adam. Melio (played by future Hollywood director Andy Tennant) purposely instigates fights between Harold and his girlfriend Lucille (Patricia Alice Albrecht), who puts Harold on a diet just before the game starts. "Blade" (Sal Lopez), a Mexican-American constantly brandishing his switchblade knife, never speaks. Additional member Barf (Brian Frishman) is apparently mentally challenged. The team vehicle is a Chevrolet Van equipped with a computer that can solve clues, but this device is destroyed early when Harold hides a stash of marshmallows in the circuitry.
- The Green Team, also known as the Meat Machine, is composed of jocks from the school football team. They are led by Lavitas (Brad Wilkin); the others are nicknamed "Blaylak" (Dirk Blocker), "Armpit" (Curt Ayers), "Cudzo" (Trevor Henley) and "Gerber" (Keny Long). Their antagonism drives both the Red and White teams into playing. The team vehicle is a Volkswagen Beetle cabriolet named the "Meat Wagon".
- The Red Team is made up of four members of an unpopular sorority, led by Donna (Maggie Roswell) and Berle (Robyn Petty) who are feminists. The other two members are frequently giggling, overweight twins (Betsy Lynn and Carol Gwynn Thompson), and many jokes involving the red team come at their expense. The Red team's vehicle is a Datsun 620, which is eventually destroyed by the Green team when they accidentally back into it.
- The White Team is made up of debate team nerds, led by Wesley (Eddie Deezen). The White Team rides matching Puch mopeds, which they eventually share with the Red team after their vehicle is destroyed.

== Cast ==
=== Main ===
- David Naughton as Adam Larson – Yellow Team Leader
- Debra Clinger as Laura – Yellow Team
- David Damas as Marvin – Yellow Team
- Joel P. Kenney as Flynch – Yellow Team (credited as Joel P. Kenney)
- Michael J. Fox as Scott Larson – Yellow Team (credited as Michael Fox)
- Stephen Furst as Harold – Blue Team Leader
- Patricia Alice Albrecht as Lucille – Blue Team
- Andy Tennant as Melio – Blue Team
- Brian Frishman as Barf – Blue Team (character called "Bobo" in UK and Australian credits)
- Sal Lopez as Blade – Blue Team
- Maggie Roswell as Donna – Red Team Leader
- Robyn Petty as Berle – Red Team
- Betsy Lynn Thompson as Peggy – Red Team
- Carol Gwynn Thompson as Lulu – Red Team
- Eddie Deezen as Wesley – White Team Leader
- Marvin Katzoff as Debater #1 – White Team
- Christofer Sands as Debater #2 – White Team
- Michael Gitomer as Debater #3 – White Team
- Brad Wilkin as Lavitas – Green Team Leader
- Dirk Blocker as Blaylak – Green Team
- Curt Ayers as Armpit – Green Team
- Trevor Henley as Cudzo – Green Team
- Keny Long as Gerber – Green Team

=== Supporting ===
- Irene Tedrow as Mrs. Grimhaus
- Alan Solomon as Leon
- Deborah Richter as Candy (credited as Debi Richter)
- Kirsten Baker as Sunshine
- John Fiedler as Wally Thorpe
- Ceil Cabot as Edna Thorpe
- Loretta Clemens Tupper as Mr. Thorpe's Mother
- Charlie Brill as Jerry – Tenant #1
- Eddie Bloom as Game Control Bookie
- Dave Shelley as Harold's Father
- Marvin Kaplan as Bonaventure Desk Clerk
- Bert Williams as Security Captain
- Arthur Adams as Police Sergeant
- Thomas Wright as Cop #1 (credited as Tom Wright)
- Elven Havard as Cop #2
- Ernie Fuentes as Miniature Golf Dad
- Pilar Del Rey as Miniature Golf Mom (credited as Pillar Del Rey)
- Georgia Schmidt as Old Lady in Car
- J. Brennan Smith as Bratty Kid
- Don Maxwell as Bratty Kid's Dad
- Paul Reubens as Pinball City Proprietor
- John Voldstad as Bellboy
- Jack Griffin as Tow Truck Driver
- Kathryn Janssen as Mrs. Killingsworth
- Dick Winslow as Tourist
- Emily Greer as Teenage Girl #1
- Sheri Shepard as Teenage Girl #2
- Paula Victor as Cashier
- Tony Salome as Irving
- Donna Garrett as Busty Waitress
- Ernie F. Orsatti as Man Punched by Berle at Stargate Disco

== Production ==
=== Background ===
In 1979, the Los Angeles International Film Expo screened the short film Junior High School (1978) which Michael Nankin and David Wechter had directed and produced. Disney's Buena Vista hired both of them to a development contract.

=== Filming ===
Principal filming started on July 2, 1979.

=== Cameos ===
Paul Reubens (known for playing Pee-wee Herman) has a small part as the Pinball City Proprietor. Other cameos include John Fiedler as Wally Thorpe, one of the other tenants, and Marvin Kaplan as the Bonaventure desk clerk. Future film director Andy Tennant plays a member of the Blue team. This is Michael J. Fox's first film, credited as Michael Fox.

Johnie's Fat Boy was Johnie's Coffee Shop, closed in 2000, and still used for filming. Pinball City was Castle Park (later Malibu Castle) Miniature Golf in North Hollywood, closed in 1998.

=== Music ===
The film features three original songs written by David Wechter and Julius Wechter. All songs were performed by Donna Fein:

- "Midnight Madness"
- "Don't Know Why I Came"
- "Someone New"

== Release ==
It grossed $2.9 million in the North American box office; additionally, Disney lost a reported $1.6 million.

=== Home media ===
It was released in 1985 on VHS by Buena Vista Home Video, in 1999 on VHS and in 2001 on DVD by Anchor Bay Entertainment; it was re-released in 2004 by Disney DVD with the "Walt Disney Pictures Presents" logo, making this the first time that Disney has openly associated with the film.

== Reception ==
Midnight Madness was rated PG, only the second film from Disney (after The Black Hole) to receive anything other than a G. The film was produced by Walt Disney Productions, but was not released under the Disney name, due to its more adult themes.

=== Critical response ===
It had a limited release and bad reviews. Roger Ebert expressed disappointment at the film as he was a fan of the early work of Nankin and Wechter.

== Legacy ==
The film was novelized in the 1980 paperback of the same name by Tom Wright.

Midnight Madness has inspired many spin-offs and other Puzzle Hunts and Alternate Reality Games (ARG). Live recreations include:

- Midnight Madness, an all-night puzzle hunt in New York City produced by Gotham Immersive Labs, heavily associated with the financial industry.
- While the movie was inspired by The Game run during the 1970s, Midnight Madness would inspire a new version of a non-stop 24- to 48-hour puzzle solving race created by Joe Belfiore. Originally named BARF (Bay Area Race Fantastique), a tribute to one of the members of Team Blue, the name was reverted to The Game.
- Minnie's Moonlit Madness (Anaheim, California) – each year hundreds of Disney cast members raise money for charity by participating in a trivia Q&A and scavenger hunt in Disneyland or Disney's California Adventure after park operating hours.

In 2024, Garch the Great released a rock cover of the theme song. It includes two new verses and was approved by David Wechter, the original composer. An alternate mix quickly found its way to YouTube.

== See also ==
- It's a Mad, Mad, Mad, Mad World (1963)
- The Last of Sheila (1973)
- Scavenger Hunt (1979)
- Million Dollar Mystery (1987)
- Rat Race (2001)
