= Metapuzzle =

Type of puzzle

A metapuzzle, also known as a meta-puzzle or meta, is a puzzle that uses the solutions to a set of puzzles to create or provide data for a final puzzle.

== Overview ==
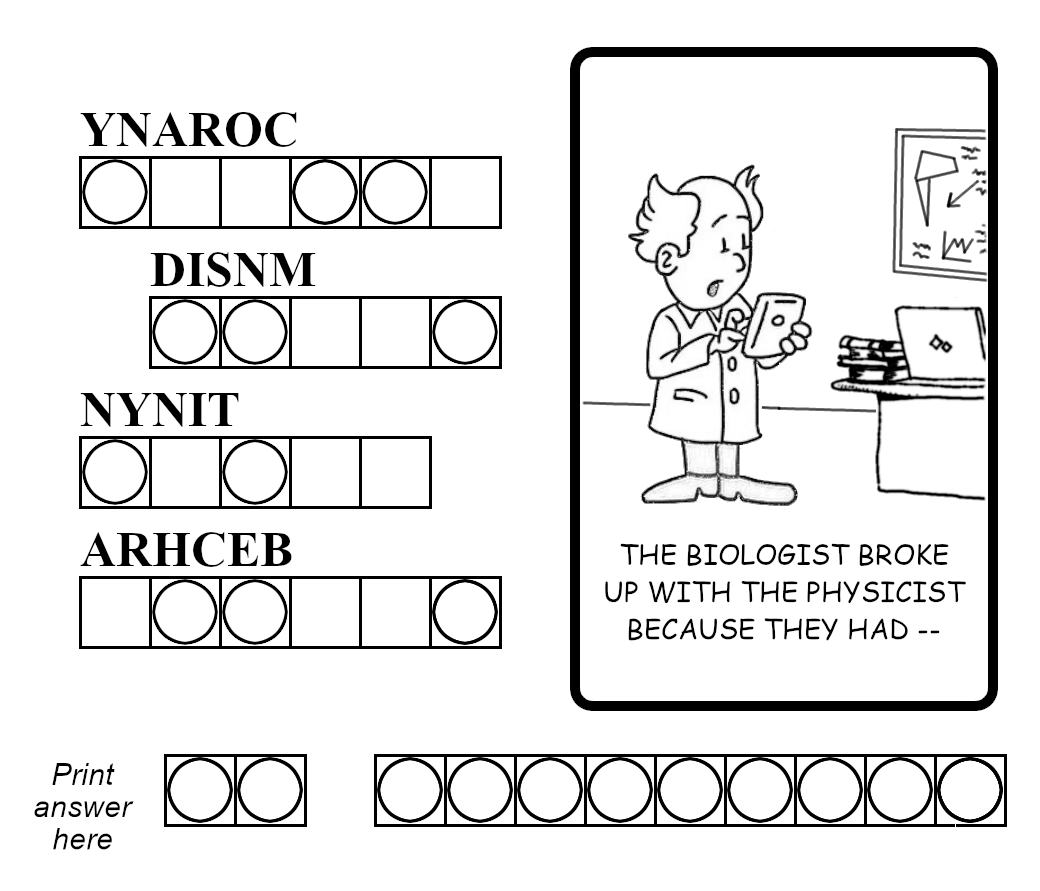
An example Jumble-style word puzzle, where solving four anagrams allows the solver to then solve a fifth, using the circled letters of the previous answers

Game designer Cliff Johnson defines a meta-puzzle as "a collection of puzzles that, when solved, each give a piece of a master puzzle." A metapuzzle is a puzzle that unites several puzzles that feed into it. For example, five puzzles that had the answers BLACK, HAMMER, FROST, KNIFE, and UNION would lead to the metapuzzle answer JACK, which combines with all of those words to make new words and phrases.

A "meta-meta" can exist in larger sets of puzzles, uniting several metapuzzles. So if that metapuzzle answer JACK was alongside three metapuzzles with the answers TEN, QUEEN, and ACE, the meta-meta answer would be KING, the remaining card in an ace high straight.

Metapuzzles are frequently found in puzzle hunts.

The structure of a metapuzzle often makes it possible to guess, with a greater or lesser degree of certainty, the solutions to the puzzles that feed into it without solving them. This technique is called backsolving. For instance, in the above example, after solving the puzzles whose answers were BLACK, HAMMER, FROST, and KNIFE, and the metapuzzle answer JACK, a backsolver might, instead of solving the fifth puzzle, correctly guess UNION as its answer simply based on the knowledge that it must form a word or phrase with JACK. Backsolving is not infallible; the same backsolver might incorrectly guess SPRING-HEELED as the answer just as easily as correctly guessing UNION.

== Types ==
=== Rally ===
In a rally metapuzzle, individual puzzles are checkpoints in a race or maze; solving the puzzle unlocks the location of the next puzzle.

=== Compilation ===
In a compilation metapuzzle, the answers to puzzles unite as components used to solve a final puzzle. This form of puzzle is particularly inclined towards backsolving, where some of the component puzzle answers are used to solve the final metapuzzle, and the metapuzzle's solution is used to solve the remaining component puzzles.

=== Cascade ===
A cascade is a metapuzzle where the solution to one puzzle becomes the basis for the next puzzle. For instance, a cryptogram might produce clues for a crossword puzzle, and the crossword's solution might form a word search.

=== Crossword ===
Crossword metapuzzles are crosswords that, when correctly solved, provide the basis for a second puzzle. Crosswords with metapuzzle components started to grow in popularity in the 2010s, after Matt Gaffney began making crossword metapuzzles in 2008.

== See also ==
=== Puzzle hunts that have metapuzzles ===
- MIT Mystery Hunt
- Microsoft Puzzle Hunt
- Microsoft Puzzle Safari
- College Puzzle Challenge
- PEA Puzzle Hunt
- VTHunt

=== Puzzle games that have metapuzzles ===
- The Fool's Errand
- 3 in Three
- System's Twilight
- The Fool and His Money
- Baba Is You

=== Puzzle books that have metapuzzles ===
- The Librarian's Almanaq
- The Maze of Games
- The Year of Puzzles

=== Websites that have metapuzzles ===
- Some Puzzles by Mark Halpin
- Planetarium
