= Puzzle hunt =

Type of puzzle game

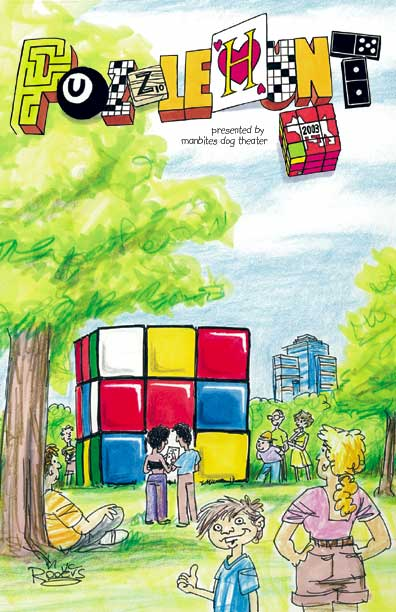
Promotional poster for the annual Manbites Dog puzzle hunt.

A puzzle hunt (sometimes рuzzlehunt) is an event where teams compete to solve a series of puzzles, many of which are tied together via metapuzzles. Puzzlehunt puzzles are usually not accompanied by direct instructions for how to solve them; figuring out the necessary approach is part of the puzzle. These hunts may be hosted at a particular location, in multiple locations, or via the internet.

== General structure ==
A puzzlehunt puzzle usually has no direct instructions for how to solve it, but instead requires solvers to deduce the approach to solving it. The method of solving may be hinted by the puzzle's title and its "flavor text". Some puzzles may involve elements of familiar puzzle types such as crossword puzzles, jigsaw puzzles, cryptograms, and others, but they often have an additional twist beyond the usual structures of such puzzles that solvers must discover. Other puzzles may have innovative structures whose mechanics solvers must work out from scratch.

The solution to a puzzlehunt puzzle is generally a word or phrase. The process of deriving the final answer once the main part of a puzzle has been solved is known as "extraction". Extracting the answer may involve, for example, selecting certain letters from words or phrases clued in the main part of the puzzle, interpreting the solution to the main puzzle in terms of encoding schemes such as Braille or Morse code, or reapplying to the output of the main puzzle the gimmick used to solve the main puzzle and produce that output.

Groups of puzzles in a puzzle hunt are often connected by a metapuzzle, which is a puzzle based on combining or comparing the answers of other ("feeder") puzzles. For some metapuzzles (sometimes called "shell" metapuzzles), the answers to the feeder puzzles must be incorporated into a puzzle structure that is separately provided to solvers; for others, ("pure" metapuzzles), the feeder puzzle answers alone provide all the information needed to solve the metapuzzle.

Puzzlehunts based in a specific location may involve "run-around" components, where solvers are directed to travel to specific sites in order to solve certain puzzles.

== Tools ==
Participants often use social chats like Discord and spreadsheets like Google Sheets to collaborate and organize information. Many puzzle hunts involve online information, so solvers often use the internet to gather information.

Additionally, some online tools are used more specifically for puzzle hunts and similar activities. Pattern matching tools like Nutrimatic allow for search and completion for words or phrases.

== History ==
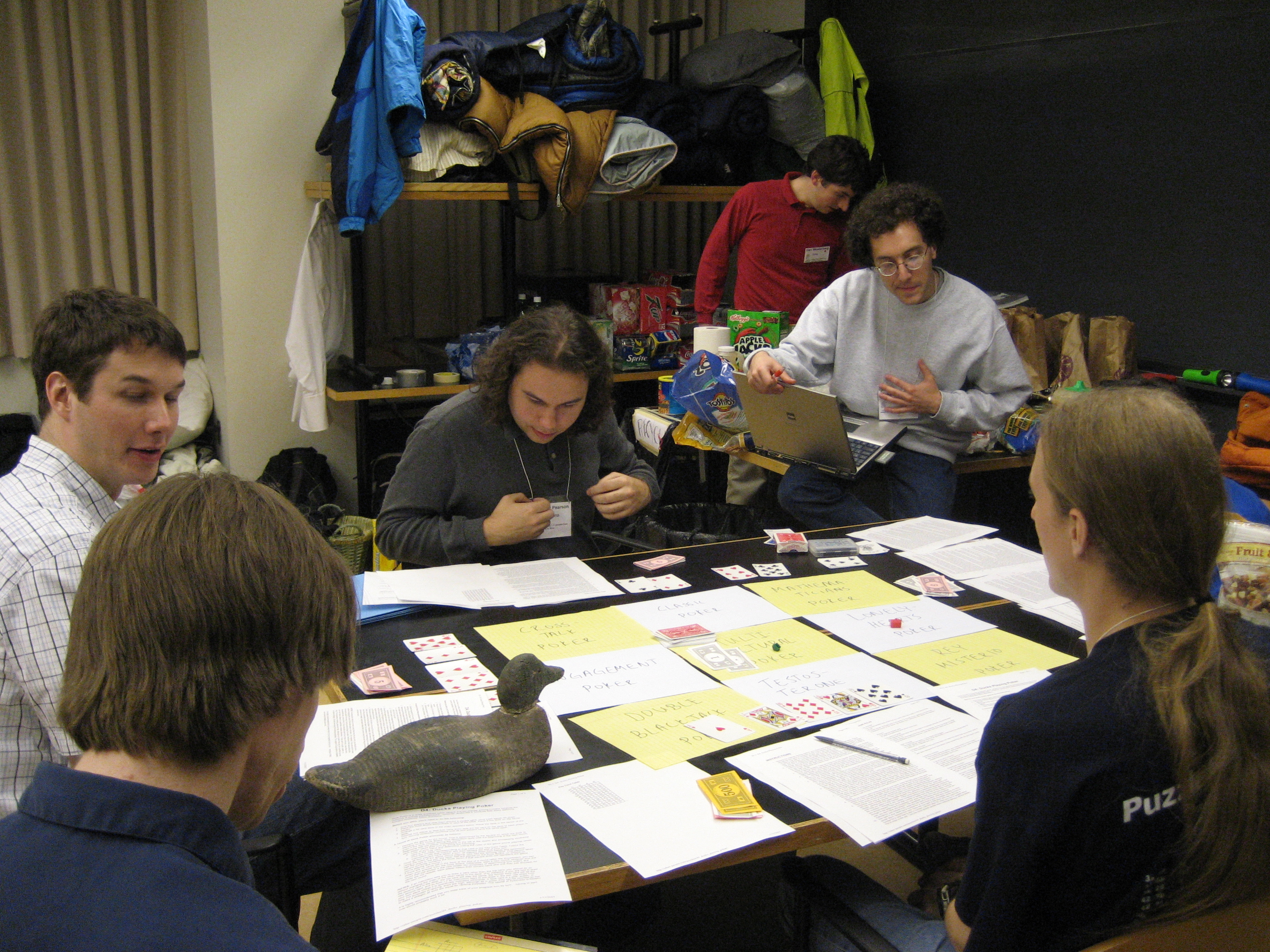
Players solving puzzles at the MIT Mystery Hunt

One of the earliest examples of puzzle hunts is the MIT Mystery Hunt, started by Brad Schaefer in 1981. Later hunts in the MIT Mystery Hunt incorporate a cohesive theme across the puzzles.

As puzzle hunts grew in popularity and scale, other universities like Melbourne University and Carnegie Mellon University created their own version of a puzzlehunt. Puzzlehunt writers also incorporate new ways of organizing rounds. Foggy Brume started the P&A Magazine, which incorporates puzzlehunt puzzles in a magazine.

Further development of the internet allowed for puzzles to make use of digital mediums, including videos and games. Some teams both compete in puzzle hunts and regularly create their online puzzle hunts. These teams also make open-source hunt frameworks like gph-site that allow even more groups to host online puzzle hunts. Many of the hunts are shared on Puzzle Hunt Calendar, developed by Dan Egnor.

== List of puzzlehunts ==
=== Famous annual puzzle hunts ===
- the MIT Mystery Hunt (Cambridge, Massachusetts, USA),
- Midnight Madness (New York City, USA)
- the Melbourne University Mathematics & Statistics Society (MUMS) puzzlehunt (Melbourne, Australia),
- the Sydney University Maths Society (SUMS) puzzle hunt (Sydney, Australia),
- the TMOU (Brno, Czech Republic),
- enigame (Germany),
- the Microsoft Puzzle Hunt (Redmond, Washington, USA),
- the Miami Herald's Tropic Hunt (Miami, Florida, USA),
- The Great Gotham Challenge (New York City, NY, USA)
- the Washington Post's Post Hunt (Washington, DC, USA),
- the Gen Con Puzzle Hunt (Indianapolis, Indiana, USA),
- Mezzacotta (formerly the Canon Information Systems Research Australia Puzzle Competition) (here),
- the Galactic Puzzle Hunt,
- D.A.S.H. (Different Area Same Hunt) takes place on the same day in multiple cities around the world using ClueKeeper as the interface.
- the Phish.net Quest puzzle sequence (summary here),
- the REDDOThunt (here),
- the Great Puzzle Hunt in Bellingham, WA every April

=== Corporate recruiting puzzle hunts ===
- APT Puzzle Tournament, a recruiting event on multiple campuses hosted by Applied Predictive Technologies
- Google Games, a multi-part competition that usually includes logic puzzles, coding, trivia, and building challenges that utilize materials like LEGO bricks
- College Puzzle Challenge (Multiple Locations, North America), hosted by Microsoft as a recruiting event on college campuses.
- Palantir's Puzzle Challenge, a recruiting event on multiple campuses hosted by Palantir Technologies

=== Collegiate puzzle hunts ===
- CMU Puzzlehunt, put on every semester by a student organization called Puzzlehunt CMU at Carnegie Mellon University's Pittsburgh, PA campus
- VT Hunt, an annual group puzzle hunt held annually by Virginia Tech's ᚖᚌᚖ Septagram Society
- Nova Quest, a campus-wide puzzle hunt organized by the Nova Quest student organization, taking place each spring at Villanova University
- Puzzle Hunt, open to all students and organized by the Rice University IEEE student chapter
- Stanford Puzzle Hunt, a puzzle hunt made annually by the Stanford University Association of Computing Machinery
- UMD PuzzleHunt, a Spring puzzle hunt written by the Puzzle Club at the University of Maryland, College Park
- PuzzleBang, an annual puzzle hunt held as part of the University of Illinois Urbana-Champaign Reflections | Projections student conference
- Brown Puzzlehunt, an annual spring puzzle hunt written by the Puzzle Club at Brown University

=== Collegiate puzzle hunts (retired) ===
- 2012-2016 Berkeley Mystery Hunt (), a puzzle hunt at UC Berkeley made by The Campus League of Puzzlers
- 2002-2008 PuzzleCrack (University of Illinois at Urbana-Champaign, USA)

=== High School puzzle hunts ===
- MaPP Challenge, a national event hosted on various college/university campuses that gets high school students solving puzzles inspired by recent developments in mathematical research
- PEA Puzzle Hunt, a puzzle hunt at Phillips Exeter Academy
- Puzzlepalooza, a puzzle hunt at Montgomery Blair High School in Silver Spring MD
- RM Pi Day and Mole Day Puzzle Hunts, two hunts celebrating their namesake days through math and science-themed puzzles at Richard Montgomery High School, located in Rockville, MD

=== Non-competitive puzzle hunts ===
Individuals or teams can take part in a puzzle hunt-style challenge using software such as ClueKeeper on their smartphones. An individual hunt is purchased, downloaded, and played at the player's convenience. Such hunts are typically not timed and offer no prize except the enjoyment of playing and the satisfaction of solving the challenge. Most are tied to a particular location and require walking from place to place as the puzzles are solved, but some are designed to be played at home.

== Related puzzle events ==
- The Game (a puzzle hunt combined with a road rally)
- Microsoft Puzzle Safari (Redmond, Washington)
- Race In The City (an Amazing Race-style event in Toronto)
- Puzzled Pint (a monthly puzzle hunt aimed at beginner to intermediate teams)
- Prehistoric Puzzlehunt (an annual event at the Museum of the Earth in Ithaca, NY) www.priweb.org/puzzlehunt
- Mission Street Puzzles (San Francisco, California)
- UNR Puzzle Hunt (A self-guided puzzle hunt on the University of Nevada Reno campus)

== See also ==
- Letterboxing
- Geocaching
- Alternate reality game
- Treasure hunt (game)
- Geohashing
- Encounter (game)
- La chouette d'or
- The Last of Sheila, a murder mystery film set at a puzzle hunt
