= The Game (treasure hunt) =

US puzzlehunt

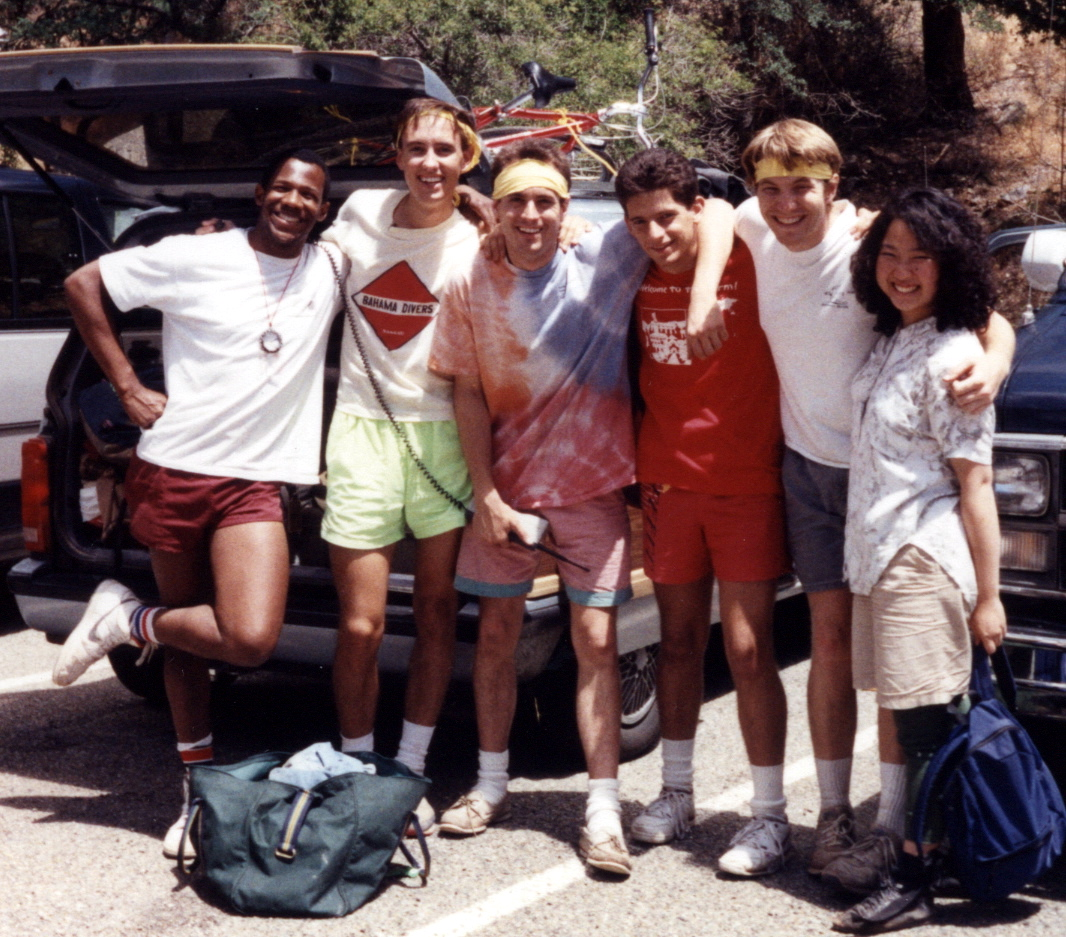
"Yellow Team", winners of the 1990 edition of The Game

The Game is a non-stop 24- to 48-hour treasure hunt, puzzlehunt or road rally that has run in the San Francisco Bay and Seattle areas. Its teams use vans rigged with power and Internet access and drive hundreds of miles from puzzle site to puzzle site, overcoming often outrageous physical and mental challenges along the way, usually with no sleep. Teams have been required to walk around the roof of the Space Needle, find a puzzle hidden in a live rat, and circulate a petition to ban dihydrogen monoxide from local ecosystems while dressed in superhero outfits.

Game founder Joe Belfiore has described the Game as "the ultimate test for Renaissance men and women."

== History ==
=== 1968 ===
In 1968, after learning about an annual treasure hunt in Chicago, lyricist/composer Stephen Sondheim thought it would be fun to reproduce a version in and around his home in Manhattan. Working with his friend and colleague actor Anthony Perkins, the two organized a treasure hunt for a Halloween party: The Eleanor Clark French Memorial Treasure Hunt (named after political posters found in Perkin's apartment).

Sondheim would later recall the puzzles were about moments of insight, not knowledge, requiring keen observation and hunting for patterns. The pair prepped envelopes to be placed under benches in a darkened park. One clue was designed to be hung over the East River from a narrow passage between two buildings. Another was to be hidden behind bowling pins in a local alley. They found a location at a beach on 42nd Street, and decided to include the street-accessible door to the apartment of Sondheim’s analyst.

The party guests were composed of NYC's theater notables: Hal Prince, Broadway producer; Roddy McDowall, actor; actress Lee Remick; composer Mary Rodgers; and Arthur Laurents, author of West Side Story. Sondheim and Perkin's equipped each team with objects (pins, scissors, string), detailed maps, and advice: “Keep talking to each other,” Sondheim told them. “Do not try to solve these things individually. Talk about them. And in talking about them, you will come up with solutions.”

Teams were chauffeured around the city in four limousines, using annotated maps to follow clues and solve puzzles at different locations.

Director Herbert Ross did not participate in the Hunt but did experience Sondheim's parlor games. When Ross had an opportunity to create his first Hollywood film, he invited Sondheim to turns those games into a murder mystery. Sondheim with Perkins then wrote the screenplay for 1973's The Last of Sheila based on those parlor games, including The Eleanor Clark French Memorial Treasure Hunt.

=== 1973 - 1979 ===
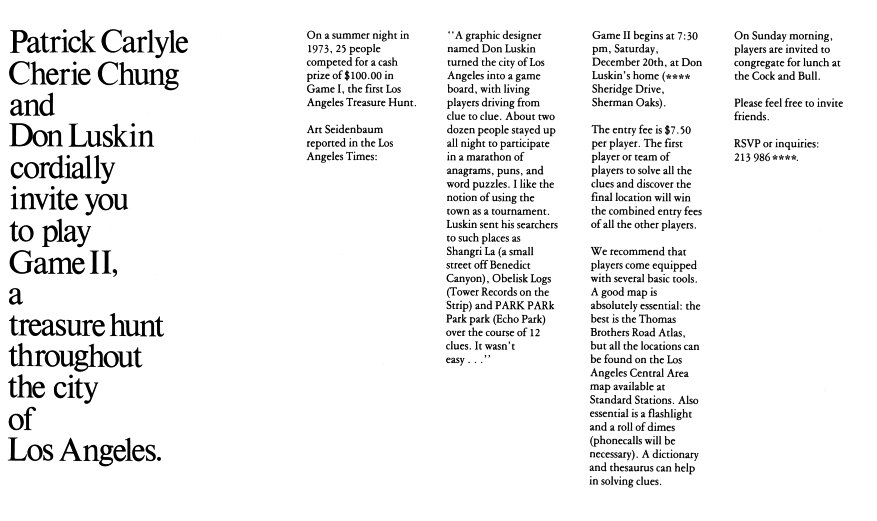
An invitation sent out to people to participate in the 1975 edition of The Game

One of the earliest iterations of The Game can be found in Los Angeles in 1973, created by a graphic designer named Donald Luskin and longtime friend, Patrick Carlyle, who were inspired by The Last of Sheila. Teams competed all night long solving puzzles across L.A. for a $100 first prize. They ran The Game four times during the 1970s. While it was a mostly underground affair, but eventually drew the attention of the Los Angeles Times. and later the Walt Disney Company, who produced a movie, Midnight Madness, based on Luskin's game.

=== 1985 - 2002 ===
In 1985 Joe Belfiore (at that time a student at Clearwater Central Catholic High School) and his friends, inspired by Midnight Madness, created a race like the one in the film. They played four more games before Joe moved to Stanford University to go to school. With Stanford classmates Eli Ben-Shoshan and Andrew Reisner, he created the Bay Area Race Fantastique (BARF) which occurred six times before changing its name to 'The Game'. There are some interesting notes about the initial BARFs and number of teams that actually completed them due to the hyper-competitive aspect of the BARF format. The term "Gentleman's Game" was used to describe the Stanford Game shortly after Joe Belfiore graduated, meaning there was no prize for winning, only bragging rights.

Two more events were held in the Bay Area before Joe Belfiore moved to Seattle to work for Microsoft, taking the official "The Game" with him (although the San Francisco Bay Area people still consider their games to also be "The Game"). Structurally, the two Games are identical, but the Seattle Games tend to be more competitive and require more technological gear. The post-Stanford Games were organized in Seattle, Napa/Sonoma, New York, Los Angeles and Las Vegas throughout 1995–2002.

=== 2002 - Present Day ===
Current versions of The Game (both full-blown and abbreviated foot-transportation-only) are organized regularly by Stanford dorm staff members as a bonding activity for their residents. Similarly, Microsoft continues running the "Intern Game" for summer interns, organized by Stanford Alums employed at Microsoft.

=== Decline ===
A full-length overnight Game has not been run in the Bay Area or Seattle since 2012. Two Games have been run in other cities: One in Washington D.C. in 2013, and one in Boston in 2019.

== Structure ==
The general structure of The Game is a series of puzzle challenges, often called "Clues". Each challenge solves to the location where the next challenge can be found. During the course of The Game, a team will often travel all around a metropolitan area.

Usually there is an overall theme to the clues, or even a story that ties all the clues together.

== Game communities ==
The next Game each year is typically run by whatever team felt the ability, chutzpah and desire to do so. In the early days of BARF and in the subsequent Seattle Games, the first-right-of-refusal fell to the team who won the previous Game. Future Game Controls (GCs) in the Bay Area tended to rely on the expertise of previous GCs and the so-called legitimacy of owning the "Captain's List". In the Bay Area there is no "Central System" or "Central Ownership" per se, but rather an autonomous collective of Gamers (a group of teams that communicate with one another) and a group-moderated site.

As the Game grew, it became increasingly more high-tech and psychological, a result of each Game trying to "outdo" the previous Games. For instance, a team member might be stripped of all clothes and spectacles, dressed in only a hospital gown, have the next puzzle written on the back of their neck in reverse lettering, and then be deposited at a strip club. Teams became increasingly competitive and even broke the rules and misled other teams to gain an advantage, much to fellow participants' and organizers' displeasure. Such teams can become blacklisted by the community at large and no longer be invited to future Games. This nature of self-policing (decentralized control and word-of-mouth) prevents out-of-control teams from destroying the elaborate events.

== Alternative Versions ==
The Game culture spawned several spinoffs in the Bay Area, including the Bay Area Treasure Hunt (BATH), Bay Area Night Game (BANG), Park Challenge, and The Iron Puzzler. There have been several spinoffs in other parts of North America as well. There are three yearly games in New York City that are very similar to The Game: Midnight Madness, The Haystack, and The Great All Nighter. There is also a yearly game in Hot Springs, Arkansas also called Midnight Madness. Midnight Madness Brevard also puts on events many times a year in Brevard County, Florida. Midnight Madness Vermont hosts MMVT events several times a year as well.

In 2009, the first multicity Game was created, the brainchild of Deborah Goldstein. Different Area Same Hunt, or DASH, the Game featured puzzles created by teams in Boston, MA, Washington, DC, Houston, TX, Los Angeles, CA, Palo Alto and San Francisco, CA, Portland, OR, and Seattle, WA. DASH was played in all 8 cities simultaneously. Since 2009, DASH has occurred several times, and continues to create and unite game communities in collaborative, multicity, realtime games.

Several new Games have appeared with modified formats, including the Black Letter Game (2012, 2015) in which the emphasis is on puzzles embedded in physical artifacts that are mailed to players on a monthly basis. No travel is required.

== Notable events ==
- During the 1999 Game, a bottle of bright green liquid was found at a game location in the New York City World Trade Center by a Marriott Hotel employee, prompting a partial evacuation of the hotel.
- In the 2002 Game, "Shelby Logan's Run", player Bob Lord was severely injured after misunderstanding a clue and falling thirty feet down a disused mineshaft. The players were sent into the desert outside Las Vegas with a clue containing the warning "1306 is clearly marked. Enter ONLY 1306. Do NOT enter others." Arriving at the site from an unexpected direction and not realizing the mines were numberd, Lord mistakenly entered mineshaft 1296, ignoring anonymous, spraypainted warnings he assumed were part of the game. The fall crushed several vertebrae and left Lord a quadriplegic. He sued the organisers of that year's Game for not mentioning the danger in the pre-game liability waiver. There was no Seattle-based Game for three years after the 2002 Game, although the Bay Area Game continued apace. The August 2005 "Mooncurser's Handbook" Game in Seattle, run by a group of twelve veteran Seattle Gamers, renewed the Seattle Game tradition, with a special emphasis on safety.

== Specific instances and similar games ==
San Francisco Bay Area games

- Doctor When Game, San Francisco Bay Area, 2012
- World Henchmen Organization (WHO), San Francisco recast, 2011
- Ghost Patrol, 2008
- Pirate's BATH (BATH3), 2007
- No More Secrets, 2007
- Hogwarts and the Draconian Prophecy, 2006
- Paparazzi, 2006
- Griffiths Collection, 2005
- Justice Unlimited, 2004
- The Genome Game, 2004
- The Goonies Game, 2003
- FoBiK, 2002
- Shelby Logan's Run—The Official 'Seattle Game' 2002
- Jackpot, Las Vegas, 2002
- Zelda: A Hidden Link, 2001
- Homicide: Life on the Farm, 2001
- The 420 Game, 2001
- MegaHard, 2000
- Wonka, 1999
- Amnesia, 1999
- Dragonhunt, 1998
- The Green Game, 1997
- Star Wars, 1997
- Indiana Jones, 1996
- Godfather, 1996
- SETI, 1996
- Magic: The Gaming, 1995
- Operation: The Plague, 1995
- The Most Dangerous Game, 1994
- King Arthur, 1994
- HELL, 1994
- R.A.T.R.A.C.E. 1993
- Alice in Wonderland, 1993
- Long Ride Home, 1992
- "Circle K" Game, 1992
- Mission Improbable, 1991

Shorter Bay Area games (less than 24 hours)

- Clue: The Game, 2008
- SFMiniGame (run simultaneously in Seattle), 2008
- Midnight Madness: Back to Basics, 2008
- The Apprentice: Zorg, 2006
- CRANEA, 2005
- BATH2, 2003
- BATH1, 2001
- Overnightmare, 2003
- Magic 8-Ball, 2002
- Beanie Babies Rescue, 1998
- The Quest for Ultimate Power, 1997

Recurring Bay Area events (less than 24 hours)

- Decathlon - 12 hour events from Shinteki
- BANG (Bay Area Night Game)

Seattle games

- Black Letter Labs, Seattle, 2012, 2015
- World Henchmen Organization (WHO), Seattle, 2011
- The Mooncurser's Handbook, Seattle, 2005
- Shelby Logan's Run, Las Vegas, 2002
- Blau Foundation, Seattle, 2001
- VQuest, Seattle, 2000
- The N. I. T., New York, 1999
- ISETV, Los Angeles, 1998
- Thanatos Society, Seattle, 1997
- Hope2Die, Seattle, 1996
- EnGenetics, Seattle, 1995

Portland games

- WarTron, Portland, Oregon, 2012

Phoenix games

- The Hunt , annual event since 1950

Boston games

- Miskatonic University Game, 2019
- WarTron, Greater Boston Area recast, 2013
- BAPHL, (Boston Area Puzzle Hunt League) recurring event since 2010

Washington, D.C. games

- The Famine Game, Washington D.C. Metro Area, 2013

National games and games outside the US

- Cygnet LLP: Rebooting the UK Game - July 2011, London
- Girls and Boys Come Out to Play - September 2014, London
- DASH (Different Area Same Hunt) - a day Game run in multiple cities simultaneously
- Casino Royale: The Game - April 2007, Singapore
