= Index of Windows games (F) =

This is an index of Microsoft Windows games.

This list has been split into multiple pages. Please use the Table of Contents to browse it.

Title	Released	Developer	Publisher
F-22 Lightning II	1996	NovaLogic	NovaLogic
F-22 Lightning 3	1999	Novalogic	Electronic Arts
F-22 Raptor	1997	Novalogic	Novalogic
F-22 Total Air War	1998	Digital Image Design	Infogrames
F.E.A.R.	2005	Monolith Productions	Vivendi Universal
F.E.A.R. 2: Project Origin	2009	Monolith Productions	Warner Bros. Interactive Entertainment
F.E.A.R. 3	2011	Day 1 Studios	Warner Bros. Interactive Entertainment
F.E.A.R. Extraction Point	2006	TimeGate Studios	Vivendi Universal
F.E.A.R. Perseus Mandate	2007	TimeGate Studios	Sierra Entertainment
F1 2000	2000	Image Space Incorporated	EA Sports
F1 Career Challenge	2003	Image Space Incorporated	EA Sports
F1 Manager	2000	Intelligent Games	EA Sports
F1 Racing Championship	2000	Ubisoft	Video System
Fable	1996	Simbiosis Interactive	Sir-Tech
Fable	2004	Lionhead Studios, Big Blue Box	Microsoft Game Studios
Faces of War	2016	Best Way	Ubisoft
Factorio	2006	Wube Software	Wube Software
Fade to Silence	2019	Black Forest Games	THQ Nordic
Fading Afternoon	2023	Yeo	Yeo, IndieArk
Faery: Legends of Avalon	2011	Spiders	Focus Home Interactive
Fahrenheit	2005	Quantic Dream	Atari
The Fairly OddParents: Breakin' Da Rules	2003	Blitz Games	THQ
The Fairly OddParents: Shadow Showdown	2004	ImaginEngine	THQ
Fairway Solitaire	2007	Grey Alien Games	Big Fish Games
Fairy Godmother Tycoon	2007	Todd Kerpelman, Mock Science Inc.	Electronic Arts
Fairy Wars	2010	Team Shanghai Alice	Team Shanghai Alice
Fairytale Fights	2009	Playlogic Game Factory	Playlogic Entertainment
Falcon 4.0	1998	MicroProse	MicroProse
Falcon 4.0: Allied Force	2005	Lead Pursuit	Graphsim Entertainment
The Falconeer	2020	Tomas Sala	Wired Productions
Fallen Earth	2009	Reloaded Productions	K2 Network
Fallen Empire: Legions	2008	GarageGames	InstantAction
Fallout	1997	Black Isle Studios	Interplay Entertainment
Fallout 2	1998	Black Isle Studios	Interplay Entertainment
Fallout 3	2008	Bethesda Game Studios	Bethesda Softworks
Fallout 4	2015	Bethesda Game Studios	Bethesda Softworks
Fallout 76	2018	Bethesda Game Studios	Bethesda Softworks
Fallout Shelter	2016	Bethesda Game Studios, Behaviour Interactive	Bethesda Softworks
Fallout Tactics: Brotherhood of Steel	2001	Micro Forte	14 Degrees East
Fallout: New Vegas	2010	Obsidian Entertainment	Bethesda Softworks
Fantastic Four	2005	7 Studios, Beenox Studios	Activision
Fantasy Earth Zero	2006	Puraguru, Multiterm, Gearsoft	Square Enix
Fantasy General	1996	Strategic Simulations, Inc.	Strategic Simulations, Inc.
Fantasy Masters	2002	Zeonix	Zeonix
Fantasy Wars	2007	Ino-Co	1C Company, Nobilis France
Far Cry	2004	Crytek	Ubisoft
Far Cry 2	2008	Ubisoft Montreal	Ubisoft
Far Cry 3	2012	Ubisoft Montreal	Ubisoft
Far Cry 3: Blood Dragon	2013	Ubisoft Montreal	Ubisoft
Far Cry 4	2014	Ubisoft Montreal	Ubisoft
Far Cry 5	2018	Ubisoft Montreal, Ubisoft Toronto	Ubisoft
Far Cry 6	2021	Ubisoft Toronto	Ubisoft
Far Cry New Dawn	2019	Ubisoft Montreal	Ubisoft
Far Cry Primal	2016	Ubisoft Montreal	Ubisoft
Farm Frenzy	2007	Melesta Games	Alawar Entertainment
Farscape: The Game	2002	Red Lemon Studios	Crucial Entertainment
Fast Food Tycoon	2000	Software 2000	Activision Value Publishing
Fast Food Tycoon 2	2001	Software 2000	Activision Value
FastCrawl	2006	Glen Pawley	Pawleyscape
Fatal Fury 3: Road to the Final Victory	1996	SNK	SNK
Fatal Hearts	2007	Hanako Games	Hanako Games
Fate	2005	WildStudios, WildTangent	WildTangent
Fate by Numbers	2007	Revival	Revival
Fate of the World	2011	Red Redemption Ltd	Red Redemption Ltd
Fate: Undiscovered Realms	2008	WildStudios, WildTangent	WildTangent
Feeding Frenzy	2004	Sprout Games, PopCap Games	GameHouse, PopCap Games
Feeding Frenzy 2	2006	PopCap Games	PopCap Games
Ferrari Virtual Academy	2010	Kunos Simulazioni	Scuderia Ferrari
Fez	2013	Polytron Corporation	Trapdoor
FIFA 06	2005	EA Canada	Electronic Arts
FIFA 07	2006	EA Canada	Electronic Arts
FIFA 08	2007	EA Canada	EA Sports
FIFA 09	2008	EA Canada	EA Sports
FIFA 10	2009	EA Canada	EA Sports
FIFA 11	2010	EA Canada	EA Sports
FIFA 12	2011	EA Canada	EA Sports
FIFA 13	2012	EA Canada	EA Sports
FIFA 14	2013	EA Canada	EA Sports
FIFA 15	2014	EA Canada	EA Sports
FIFA 16	2015	EA Canada	EA Sports
FIFA 17	2016	EA Vancouver, EA Bucharest	EA Sports
FIFA 18	2017	EA Vancouver, EA Romania	EA Sports
FIFA 19	2018	EA Vancouver, EA Romania	EA Sports
FIFA 20	2019	EA Vancouver, EA Romania	EA Sports
FIFA 2000	1999	EA Canada	Electronic Arts
FIFA 2001	2000	EA Canada	Electronic Arts
FIFA 2002	2001	EA Canada	Electronic Arts
FIFA 97	1996	EA Canada	Electronic Arts
FIFA 99	1998	EA Canada	Electronic Arts
FIFA Football 2003	2002	EA Canada	Electronic Arts
FIFA Football 2004	2003	EA Canada	Electronic Arts
FIFA Football 2005	2004	EA Canada	Electronic Arts
FIFA: Road to World Cup 98	1997	EA Canada	Electronic Arts
The Fifth Element	1998	Kalisto	Activision
Fighter Squadron: The Screamin' Demons Over Europe	1999	Parsoft Interactive	Activision
Fighting Force	1997	Core Design	Eidos Interactive
Final Doom	1996	id Software, TeamTNT, Casali brothers	GT Interactive
Final Fantasy VII	1997	Square Co.	Eidos Interactive
Final Fantasy VIII	1999	Square Co.	Square Co., Square Electronic Arts, Eidos Interactive
Final Fantasy XI	2002	Square Co.	Square Co., Square Enix
Final Fantasy XIII	2014	Square Enix	Square Enix
Final Fantasy XIV	2010	Square Enix	Square Enix
Final Fantasy XV	2018	Square Enix	Square Enix
Final Liberation: Warhammer Epic 40,000	1997	Holistic Design	Strategic Simulations, Inc.
Finding Nemo	2003	Traveller's Tales	THQ, Disney Interactive, Yuke's
Fire Fight	1996	Chaos Works, Epic MegaGames	Electronic Arts
Firewatch	2016	Campo Santo	Campo Santo, Panic
Firo & Klawd	1996	Interactive Studios	BMG
First Eagles: The Great War 1918	2006	Third Wire Productions	G2 Games
The First Templar	2011	Haemimont Games	Kalypso Media
Fish Tycoon	2004	Last Day of Work	Big Fish Games
Fist of Awesome	2013	I Fight Bears	I Fight Bears
Five Nights at Freddy's	2014	Scott Cawthon	Scott Cawthon
Five Nights at Freddy's 2	2014	Scott Cawthon	Scott Cawthon
Five Nights at Freddy's 3	2015	Scott Cawthon	Scott Cawthon
Five Nights at Freddy's 4	2015	Scott Cawthon	Scott Cawthon
Five Nights at Freddy's: Sister Location	2016	Scott Cawthon	Scott Cawthon
Fizzball	2006	Grubby Games	Grubby Games
FlatOut	2004	Bugbear Entertainment	Empire Interactive
FlatOut 2	2006	Bugbear Entertainment	Empire Interactive
Flatspace	2003	Cornutopia Software	
Fleet Command	1999	Sonalysts Combat Simulations	Electronic Arts, Strategy First
Fleet Defender	1995	Microprose	Microprose
Flesh Feast	1998	Ingames	SegaSoft
Flight Unlimited	1996	Looking Glass Studios	Virgin Interactive
Flight Unlimited II	1997	Looking Glass Studios	Eidos Interactive
Flight Unlimited III	1999	Looking Glass Studios	Electronic Arts
Flintlock: The Siege of Dawn	2024	A44 Games	Kepler Interactive
Flock!	2009	Proper Games	Capcom
Floodland	2022	Vile Monarch	Ravenscourt
Flyable Heart	2009	UNiSONSHIFT: Blossom	UNiSONSHIFT
Flying Corps	1996	Rowan Software	Empire Interactive
Flying Tigers: Shadows Over China	2017	Ace Maddox	Ace Maddox
The Fool and His Money	2009	Cliff Johnson	Cliff Johnson
Football Manager 2005	2005	Sports Interactive	SEGA
Football Manager 2006	2005	Sports Interactive	SEGA
Football Manager 2007	2006	Sports Interactive	Sega
Football Manager 2008	2007	Sports Interactive	Sega
Football Manager 2009	2008	Sports Interactive	Sega
Football Manager 2010	2009	Sports Interactive	Sega
Football Manager Live	2008	Sports Interactive	SEGA
Football Mania	2002	Silicon Dreams Studio	Electronic Arts
Forbes Corporate Warrior	1997	Brooklyn Multimedia	Byron Preiss Multimedia
Ford Racing	2000	Razorworks	Empire Interactive
Ford Racing 2	2003	Razorworks	Empire Interactive
Ford Racing 3	2004	Razorworks	Empire Interactive
Ford Street Racing	2006	Razorworks	Empire Interactive
The Forest	2018	Endnight Games	Endnight Games
Forge of Freedom: The American Civil War	2006	Western Civilization Software	Matrix Games
The Forgotten City	2021	Modern Storyteller	Dear Villagers
The Forgotten Realms Archives	1997	Strategic Simulations, Inc.	Interplay Entertainment
Forgotten Realms: Demon Stone	2004	Stormfront Studios	Atari
A Fork in the Tale	1997	Advance Reality Interactive	Any River Entertainment
Formula 1	1996	Bizarre Creations	Psygnosis
Formula 1 97	1997	Bizarre Creations	Psygnosis
Formula One 99	1999	Studio 33	Psygnosis
Forsaken	1998	Probe Entertainment	Acclaim
Forspoken	2023	Luminous Productions	Square Enix
Fort Solis	2023	Fallen Leaf, Black Drakkar Games	Dear Villagers
Fortnite Battle Royale	2017	Epic Games	Epic Games
Fortress Forever	2007	Fortress Forever Development Team	
Fortune-499	2018	AP Thomson	
Forza Motorsport 7	2017	Turn 10 Studios	Microsoft Studios
Foundation	2025	Polymorph Games	Polymorph Games
Fractal	2010	Cipher Prime	
Fractured Minds	2017	Emily Mitchell	Wired Productions
Fragile Allegiance	1996	Gremlin Interactive, Cajji Software	Gremlin Interactive
Frank Herbert's Dune	2001	Cryo Interactive	Widescreen Games
Frankenstein: Through the Eyes of the Monster	1996	Amazing Media	Interplay Entertainment
Freddi Fish and the Case of the Missing Kelp Seeds	1994	Humongous Entertainment	Humongous Entertainment
Freddi Fish 2: The Case of the Haunted Schoolhouse	1996	Humongous Entertainment	Humongous Entertainment
Freddi Fish 3: The Case of the Stolen Conch Shell	1998	Humongous Entertainment	Humongous Entertainment
Freddi Fish 4: The Case of the Hogfish Rustlers of Briny Gulch	1999	Humongous Entertainment	Humongous Entertainment
Freddi Fish 5: The Case of the Creature of Coral Cove	2001	Humongous Entertainment	Humongous Entertainment
Freddy Pharkas: Frontier Pharmacist	1993	Al Lowe, Josh Mandel	Sierra On-Line
Freak Out: Extreme Freeride	2007	ColdWood Interactive	JoWooD Productions
Free Realms	2009	SOE San Diego	Sony Online Entertainment
Freeciv	1999	The Freeciv developers	The Freeciv project
FreeCol	2003	The Freecol Team	SourceForge.net
Freedom Fighters	2003	IO Interactive	Electronic Arts
Freedom Force	2002	Irrational Games	Electronic Arts
Freedom Force vs the 3rd Reich	2005	Irrational Games	Digital Jesters
Freelancer	2003	Digital Anvil	Microsoft Game Studios
FreeSpace 2	1999	Volition	Interplay Entertainment
Frets on Fire	2006	Unreal Voodoo	
Friday the 13th: The Game	2017	IllFonic, Black Tower Studios	Gun Media
The Friends of Ringo Ishikawa	2018	Yeo	Yeo
Frobot	2010	Fugazo Studios	Fugazo Studios
Frogger 2: Swampy's Revenge	2000	Blitz Games	Hasbro Interactive
Frogger	1997	SCE Studio Cambridge	Hasbro Interactive
Frogger Beyond	2002	Konami	Konami
Frogger's Adventures: The Rescue	2003	Konami HWI	Konami
Frogger: Ancient Shadow	2005	Hudson Soft	Konami
Frogger: The Great Quest	2001	Konami	Konami
Frog Sqwad	2026	Panic Stations	Panic Stations
From Dusk Till Dawn	2001	Gamesquad	Cryo Interactive
From Dust	2011	Ubisoft Montpellier	Ubisoft
Front Page Sports: Baseball Pro '98	1997	Dynamix	Sierra On-Line
Front Page Sports: Golf	1997	Headgate Studios	Sierra On-Line
Front Page Sports: Ski Racing	1997	Dynamix	Sierra On-Line
Frontlines: Fuel of War	2008	Kaos Studios	THQ
Frostpunk	2018	11 Bit Studios	11 Bit Studios
Frostpunk 2	2024	11 Bit Studios	11 Bit Studios
Frozen Bubble	2002	Guillaume Cottenceau	Guillaume Cottenceau
Frozen Synapse	2011	Mode 7 Games	Mode 7 Games
FTL: Faster Than Light	2012	Subset Games	
Fuel	2009	Asobo Studio	Codemasters
Fuga: Melodies of Steel	2021	CyberConnect2	CyberConnect2
Fuga: Melodies of Steel 2	2023	CyberConnect2	CyberConnect2
Full Pipe	2003	Pipe Studio	1C Company
Full Spectrum Warrior	2004	Pandemic Studios	THQ
Full Spectrum Warrior: Ten Hammers	2006	Pandemic Studios	THQ
Full Tilt! Pinball	1996	Cinematronics	Microsoft
Fur Fighters	2000	Bizarre Creations	Acclaim
Furcadia	1996	Dragon's Eye Productions	Dragon's Eye Productions
Furifuri	2008	130cm	Visual Art's
Fury	2007	Auran	Gamecock Media Group
Fury3	1995	Terminal Reality	Microsoft
Fuser	2020	Harmonix	NCSoft
Future Cop: LAPD	1998	Electronic Arts	Electronic Arts
Future Tactics: The Uprising	2004	Zed Two	Crave Entertainment, JoWooD Productions
