= Ford Mustang: The Legend Lives =

2005 video game

- Developer: Eutechnyx
- Publishers: NA: 2K; EU: Global Star Software
- Producer: Brian Etheridge
- Designer: Kev Shaw
- Series: Ford Racing
- Platforms: PlayStation 2 Xbox
- Release: NA: April 19, 2005
- Genre: Racing
- Modes: Single player, Multiplayer

Ford Mustang: The Legend Lives is a 2005 racing video game developed by Eutechnyx and published by 2K and Global Star Software for the PlayStation 2 (PS2) and Xbox. It is part of the Ford Racing series, following Ford Racing 3. This is the first Ford Racing game to not be released on PC.

== Gameplay ==
The game features 40 playable Ford Mustang vehicles, including production, concept, and racing models, ranging from 1964 to 2005. The game includes 22 race tracks set across seven U.S. cities, including Chicago, Miami, New York City, and San Francisco.

The game has three single-player modes: Career, Arcade, and Challenge. In Career mode, the player creates a custom Ford Mustang with which to race against others. For winning races, the player receives money that can be used to upgrade parts of the vehicle. Arcade mode features various races, most of which are time challenges. In Challenge mode, the player competes against other drivers in various racing events, which include time challenges, and driving through gates without crashing while rival drivers attempt to disrupt the player's goal. The game also features several two-player modes.

== Reception ==
Reception

Aggregate score
Aggregator	Score	
Aggregator	PS2	Xbox
Metacritic	58/100	55/100

Review scores
Publication	Score	
Publication	PS2	Xbox
GameSpot	4.4/10	4.4/10
GameZone	N/A	7.5/10
Jeuxvideo.com	11/20	N/A
Official Xbox Magazine (UK)	N/A	7/10
TeamXbox	N/A	7/10
Detroit Free Press	N/A	2/4
The Sydney Morning Herald	2/5	2/5

The game received "mixed" reviews on both platforms according to the review aggregation website Metacritic.

Gord Goble of GameSpot criticized the game's controls, graphics, and Career mode. Official Xbox Magazine UK considered the game to be a "decent, well-crafted racer" and wrote that its subject matter might have limited appeal. Graham Darko of Xbox World Australia believed that the game would only appeal to Mustang fans, and noted that there were better games available which feature the vehicle.

Heather Newman of Detroit Free Press reviewed the Xbox version and believed that the vehicles did not drive like real Mustangs. However, she noted that the controls felt decent and that the game had a fair amount of entertainment. Code Cowboy of GameZone praised the graphics and sound effects of the Xbox version. Joe Ropeti of Gameplanet reviewed the Xbox version and criticized its artificial intelligence and outdated gameplay as unbefitting of the Mustang legacy.

Brent Soboleski of TeamXbox praised the Career mode and the abundance of vehicles and race tracks, but criticized the game's lack of Xbox Live and customizable soundtracks, two features that were present in the game's predecessor, Ford Racing 3. Mike Willcox of The Sydney Morning Herald criticized the game's replay value, outdated graphics, mediocre soundtrack, and poor physics simulation. He also noted no car damage penalties for driving carelessly.

== See also ==
- Corvette (video game)
