= Ford Racing 2 =

2003 video game

- Cover art featuring a Ford GT, three Ford Mustangs, and a Ford F-150
- Developer: Razorworks (Note: Ported to Mac OS X by Zonic Ltd)
- Publishers: NA: Gotham Games (PS2, Xbox); NA: Empire Interactive (PC); EU: Empire Interactive; Feral Interactive (Mac)
- Producers: Danny Rawles; Slade Anderson
- Designers: Terry Watts; Kris Jones
- Composers: Tim Follin; Bjorn Lynne
- Platforms: PlayStation 2 Xbox; Windows; Mac OS X
- Release: PlayStation 2: NA: 28 October 2003; EU: 31 October 2003; Xbox: EU: 31 October 2003; NA: 3 November 2003; Windows: EU: 31 October 2003; NA: 11 December 2003; Mac OS X: WW: December 2004; (Note: Exact release date appears to be inconsistent with December 2004 being reported by multiple sources)
- Genre: Racing
- Modes: single-player, multiplayer

Ford Racing 2 is a 2003 racing video game developed by Razorworks and published by Empire Interactive and Gotham Games. The game was released for Windows, Mac OS X, PlayStation 2 (PS2), and Xbox. It is the sequel to Ford Racing (2000), and is the second game in the Ford Racing series. It received mixed reviews from critics.

== Gameplay ==
Ford Racing 2 features two game modes: the Ford Challenge and the Ford Collection. The Ford Challenge contains approximately 30 challenges for the player, including head-to-head racing and time-limit racing. The Ford Collection allows the player to create customisable challenges. The player progresses through the Ford Challenge by winning races, which also unlocks new items and locations for the Ford Collection.

The game includes over 30 Ford vehicles from the past and present, as well as Ford concept vehicles. Race tracks include stadiums, as well as jungle and desert environments. The game includes a multiplayer option, and the Xbox version supports the use of customised soundtracks. The Xbox version included online scoreboards through Xbox Live which was shut down on April 15, 2010. Ford Racing 2 is now supported online with replacement online servers for the Xbox called Insignia.

== Release ==
The PS2 version was first released on 28 October 2003, while in the United States, the Xbox version was released on 3 November, followed by the Windows version on 11 December. Feral Interactive completed a Macintosh version of the game in October 2004, and published it later that year.

== Reception ==
Reception

Aggregate scores
Aggregator	Score			
Aggregator	Macintosh	PC	PS2	Xbox
GameRankings		61%	62%	
Metacritic			51/100	62/100

Review scores
Publication	Score			
Publication	Macintosh	PC	PS2	Xbox
GameSpot		5.5/10		6.8/10
IGN			4.9/10	4.9/10
Official U.S. PlayStation Magazine			50	
Official Xbox Magazine (UK)				6.4/10
Official Xbox Magazine (US)				5.8/10
PC Gamer (US)		69/100		
TeamXbox				7/10
X-Play				3/5
Inside Mac Games	7.75/10			
Macworld	3.5/5			
Xbox Nation Magazine				50

According to Metacritic, the PS2 and Xbox versions received "mixed or average reviews".

Tyler Winegarner of GameSpot reviewed the Xbox version and wrote that aside from graphical issues, "the biggest problem that prevents Ford Racing 2 from being totally recommendable involves the amount of time you're able to spend with it. If you aren't a stranger to racing games, you'll be able to breeze through most races on your first try on the standard difficulty setting. However, there are so few races that you can finish the game in a dedicated afternoon sitting." Gord Goble of GameSpot reviewed the PC version and wrote that while it had a large number of challenges and vehicles, "the game is plagued by dated physics and a sense that you've already seen the same thing--only better. If it were released a few years prior, just as Electronic Arts' Need for Speed was finding its footing, Ford Racing 2 would have fared a lot better."

Ed Lewis of IGN reviewed the PS2 and Xbox versions. Lewis criticised the music and sound effects, and wrote that when the game "finally does get its groove on, it has a few moments of some mildly exciting racing, but these were far and few between. The arcadey physics and simple tracks make for a pretty bland experience." X-Play praised the sound effects and car designs of the Xbox version, and stated that it "doesn't have nearly the depth or visual prowess of the bigger name racing titles, but it succeeds by offering a variety of car types and combining true racing physics with a pick-up-and-play accessibility for the casual fan."

PC Gamer wrote: "Many of the game's varied track environments are on par with those in A-list arcade racers." Official U.S. PlayStation Magazine called the game, "surprisingly playable", while Xbox Nation Magazine called the game as "heartily mediocre". Mike Salmon of Official Xbox Magazine criticised the controls, but noted that the game "looks surprisingly good". Australia's Official Xbox Magazine wrote about the game: "Aimed at casual gamers after cheap racing fun, but it's very predictable."

Jerry Kahlil of TeamXbox wrote that the "catchy" music can become "extremely repetitive". Kahlil also considered the graphics to be average, and stated that "the lack of any realistic car damage or effects was disappointing". However, he concluded that Ford Racing 2 "is a competent entry into the arcade-racing genre. While there isn't a lot of innovation, you just cannot argue with a ticket price of $19.99. Fans of Ford classic and concept cars should take notice."

Michael Miller of Inside Mac Games reviewed the Macintosh version. Miller praised the faithful vehicle recreations and variety of racing modes, but he criticised the controls and found the interface to be confusing. Peter Cohen of Macworld enjoyed the game, but opined that players looking for a realistic driving experience would likely be disappointed by it.
