= Gel: Set & Match =

2009 video game

- Developer: Gastronaut Studios
- Publisher: Microsoft Game Studios
- Platform: Xbox 360 (XBLA)
- Release: May 20, 2009
- Genres: Puzzle, action
- Modes: Single-player, multiplayer

Gel: Set & Match is a puzzle action game developed by Gastronaut Studios and published by Microsoft Game Studios. It was released for the Xbox 360 on May 20, 2009 at Xbox Live Arcade.

== Reception ==
Reception

Aggregate score
Aggregator	Score
Metacritic	72/100

Review scores
Publication	Score
Destructoid	8/10
IGN	7.6/10
Official Xbox Magazine (US)	6.5/10
TeamXbox	8.4/10

The game received "mixed or average reviews" according to the review aggregation site Metacritic. GamePro said, "Action mode is fast-paced, as you seek out a fresh pathway for a pursuing tank, which becomes immobile if gel blocks stand in its way. Puzzle mode, however, is less stressful." (Note: GamePro gave the game two 2.75/5 scores for graphics and sound, and two 3.25/5 scores for control and fun factor.)

Since its release, the game sold 8,712 units worldwide by January 2011.
