= At the Carnival =

1989 video game

At The Carnival
- Developer: Cliff Johnson
- Platforms: Macintosh, MS-DOS
- Release: 1989
- Genre: Puzzle
- Mode: Single-player

At The Carnival is a puzzle video game by Cliff Johnson published in 1989 by Miles Computing.

It was intended to be the first of a series of games called Puzzle Gallery, but Miles Computing went out of business before any further games could be made.

At The Carnival is a collection of games similar to some in The Fool's Errand, but with enhanced user interfaces. The endgame puzzle is simpler compared to Fool's Errand and 3 in Three, consisting merely of a crossword puzzle filled by key words found in other solved puzzles.

== Plot ==
The game has no overarching story as such; each puzzle shows a small section of Hazard Park, an amusement park with woeful disdain for its customers. Completing the puzzles in a particular section displays the fate of the unfortunate guests at a given ride, attraction, or location for that particular section.

One puzzle in the game has Cliff Johnson describing the discovery of Elmer McCurdy.

== Gameplay ==
Some of the major puzzle types in the games include:

- Jumbles - mixed-up words to be reordered.
- Word searches - find words hidden in a grid of letters
- Cryptograms - decipher encrypted phrases
- Crosswords - fill answers into boxes based on specified clues. (Not full-sized crossword puzzles.)
- Word grids - rearrange 9 letters into a grid to make words in all horizontal, vertical, and diagonal directions.
- Polygons - fit pentomino-like polygons into a grid; letters on the polygons spell out words.
- Jigsaw puzzles - rearrange cut-up pictures to remake the original
- Concatenations - several buttons concatenate letters to the current phrase; find the correct order to build a complete phrase
- Mazes - various types of mazes that must be navigated
- XOR displays - a set of buttons XORs various shapes together; the right combination of buttons will produce a word

== Release ==
The original version of the game was for Macintosh. A port to MS-DOS was made, but it is not as visually appealing due to the lower resolution available to IBM PC-class machines at the time (320×200 VGA vs. 512×342 minimum on Macintoshes). In later years the author made the game freely downloadable Freeware on his website. Cliff Johnson strongly recommends playing the Macintosh version instead of the MS-DOS version, using an emulator such as Executor or Basilisk II if necessary.

== Reception ==
Compute! stated that players would find At the Carnival "hard to stop playing", with "the best mazes you'll ever see on the Mac".

Macworld noted that At the Carnival made certain improvements on Johnson's previous game The Fool's Errand, including color graphics and built-in hints; however, for the reviewer, At the Carnival missed some of the magic of The Fool's Errand, lacking its mythical journey and animated finale. The review concluded that At the Carnival was an enjoyable game, that its "only real problem may be that it has to follow a masterpiece." Macworld inducted At the Carnival into its Game Hall of Fame in 1989 in the Brain Teaser category.
