= Merluza =

Merluza could refer to one of several things

- Merlucciidae, a family of cod-like fish.
- Merluza, a character in the Japanese adult visual novel Furifuri
