= Mysterious Stranger =

2002 book by David Blaine

Mysterious Stranger: A Book of Magic
- Author: David Blaine
- Language: English
- Published: October 29, 2002
- Publication place: United States
- Media type: Print
- ISBN: 978-0375505737
- OCLC: 49925771
- Dewey Decimal: 793.8
- LC Class: GV1547 .B646 2002

Mysterious Stranger: A Book of Magic is a book by American illusionist David Blaine that was published on October 29, 2002 by Random House. Part autobiography, part history, and part armchair treasure hunt, the book also includes instructions on how to perform basic card tricks and illusions.

== Synopsis ==
The book has been divided into 12 chapters — For Those Who Believe, Discovery of Magic, The Three Magi, Secrets of Cards, Confidence, Playing the Part of a Magician, The Man Ain't Right, Primitive Mysteries, Ehrich Weiss, The Premature Burial, Frozen in Time^{2}, Vertigo.

In the chapter "Discovery of Magic", Blaine tells stories about his childhood, of how he became interested in magic, and of his devotion to his late mother.

In "The Three Magi", he acknowledges Robert-Houdin, Max Malini and Alexander Herrmann as major influences; in "Confidence", he cites Orson Welles and Titanic Thompson as inspiration for his street magic persona; and in "Ehrich Weiss", he celebrates the man we know as Houdini.

In "The Man Ain't Right", Blaine describes the evolution of his street magic act and how a masterfully timed card trick cinched his television deal with ABC.

In "Premature Burial", "Frozen in Time", and "Vertigo", Blaine details his grueling regime in preparation for each of his stunts of endurance, respectively, being buried in a glass coffin for seven days, standing inside a block of ice for sixty-one hours, and standing atop a 100-foot pole in high winds for thirty-five hours.

In addition, scattered throughout the book are clues to Blaine's $100,000 Challenge, an armchair treasure hunt of visual ciphers and logic deduction devised by game designer Cliff Johnson, creator of The Fool's Errand. The Challenge was solved by Sherri Skanes on March 20, 2004, 16 months after the book's publication.

== Treasure Hunt reference ==
- The Official Solution
- The Winner's Tale
