= Ford Street Racing =

2006 video game

- Developer: Razorworks
- Publishers: EU: Empire Interactive; NA: Eidos Interactive
- Platforms: Microsoft Windows, PlayStation 2, PlayStation Portable, Xbox
- Release: PlayStation 2, Windows, Xbox: EU: February 24, 2006; NA: September 19, 2006; PlayStation Portable: NA: October 17, 2006; EU: November 10, 2006
- Genre: Racing
- Mode: Single-player

Ford Street Racing (also known as Ford Bold Moves Street Racing in North America) is a game commissioned by Ford for the Xbox (not compatible with Xbox 360), PC, PlayStation 2 and PlayStation Portable (PSP). The game was sold as Ford Street Racing on the PC while the various console releases were given region specific names. They are as follows: Ford Bold Moves Street Racing in the US and Canada, Ford Street Racing: L.A. Duel in the EU, and Ford Street Racing: XR Edition in Australia and New Zealand. It was released September 19, 2006 in the United States. It was developed by Razorworks and published by Empire Interactive under the Empire banner in the US and under the Xplosiv banner in the rest of the world. The game received mostly mixed to negative reviews.

== Versions ==
=== Home console and PC versions ===
The console and PC versions of the game have 18 cars, while the Australian XR Edition swapped 3 standard cars for 3 iconic Australian market Falcons. The game features team and solo championship modes, as well as an "Arcade" mode. Team mode allows the player to toggle between the cars in the player's team during the race; cars that are not being driven by the player are driven by the game's artificial intelligence until the player selects it. The player has to play and win various championships to unlock new tracks, new vehicles and unlock new tournaments to earn cash to purchase those newly unlocked vehicles and/or repair the ones that are currently owned. These unlocked cars, tracks, and race types can be raced, without consequence, in the Solo Racing and Team Racing. Notable cars featured in the game include Ford Mustang Boss 302, Ford RS200, Ford GT, Ford Lightning and the Ford Mustang SVT Cobra.

=== Sony PSP versions ===
The PSP versions were sold with the same regional title tweaks that the console versions received, but "in a substantially expanded form, with more cars, tracks, and team modes than even the home versions had to offer". Compared to the console versions, the US market Bold Moves and EU market L.A. Duel added six extra cars (bringing the total to 24) and six new tracks (making a total of 18). The Australian XR Edition added two Falcon sedans (a 1970 Falcon GT-HO and a 2005 Falcon GT-XR8) and a 2005 Falcon XR8 ute to the garage, making for a total of 27 vehicles. All other aspects of the three games are the same.

The gameplay on the Sony PSP versions is similar to the console versions in that the player has to win various solo and team championships to unlock new tracks, new vehicles and unlock new tournaments to earn cash to purchase those newly unlocked vehicles and/or repair the ones they currently own. These unlocked cars, tracks, and race types can be raced, without consequence, in the Arcade mode. One difference from the console versions is that the damage is cosmetic only and the performance of the vehicle is not affected by crash damage.

== Reception ==
The PlayStation 2 and PSP versions received mixed reviews, and the PC and Xbox versions received generally unfavorable reviews.

VideoGamer.com reviewed the PSP version and noted the "impressive visuals and some tight controls". Douglass C. Perry of IGN called the PSP version "the lousiest racing game of the year".

Official Xbox Magazine criticized the gameplay and gave the game a rating of 4 out of 10. PC Zone, which gave the game 6.2 out of 10, noted its team racing aspect but wrote "the handling is fairly woolly and there's no real sense of speed".

== See also ==
- Ford Racing (series)
