= 3 in Three =

1989 video game

- Developer: Cliff Johnson
- Publishers: Cinemaware; Inline Design
- Platform: Mac OS
- Release: 1989
- Mode: Single-player

3 in Three is a 1989 metapuzzle video game designed by Cliff Johnson and published by Cinemaware and Inline Design.

While bearing some similarities to his previous game, The Fool's Errand, 3 in Three took place inside a computer. The game is about a number 3, lost in the innards of the computer by a power surge. The 3 attempts to repair the damage caused by the power surge and make her way back to the spreadsheet, providing the background story for the game.

== Gameplay ==
The game consists of many separate sections, each of which contains one puzzle. However, unlike Fool's Errand, each section may need to be visited multiple times, as it may carry along part of the story at times when it does not contain a puzzle. Each puzzle (upon completion) places one letter in the Letter Legislature. When the entire legislature is in place, a logic puzzle (see below) is used to properly order them, at which point the endgame begins; the hints found in previous puzzles are used to complete the meta-puzzle and finish the game.

Unlike The Fool's Errand, the puzzles in 3 in Three are rarely traditional puzzles like cryptograms or word searches; instead, the puzzles tend to take advantage of the possibilities of computer games. Some of the prominent puzzle types include:

- Lift puzzles - the 3 must navigate across a field of lifts by putting her lift and the lift to her right at the same level.
- Mesh puzzles - the 3 must change a mesh (of sizes ranging from 3x3 to 9x9) to match a given pattern.
- Missing vowels - the 3 must add missing vowels to common proverbs or homophones.
- Trapdoor puzzles - the 3 must open or close all of a set of doors; clicking on one door will toggle the open state of several others, with the exact set of doors, toggled depending on the state of the door clicked. (Thus clicking on door 3 may open or close doors 1, 3, and 9 if it is open, but 3, 4, and 5 if it is closed.)
- Reordered word puzzles - the 3 must rearrange a word to spell another word in 3 clicks. Each click switches two letters; the letters switched depend on which letter is clicked and its position in the word.
- Logic puzzles - A grid of items must be rearranged to meet specific rules. (For example, a set of Roman numerals may include a rule like 'XVI is north of XIV'.)

== Release ==
Unlike the developer's earlier games, 3 in Three was never ported but was released only for the Macintosh. It was initially released by Cinemaware, which went out of business in 1991; the license was then picked up by Inline Design, which went out of business in 1995. It is now freeware and can be found on the author's website. It includes information which allows the game to be played on Windows PCs.

== Reception ==
3 in Three was reviewed positively in Macworld, which described it as "an ultramodern Alice's Adventures in Wonderland" with an "obsessively good set" of puzzles. Macworld noted occasional issues with puzzles that were too easy or frustrating, but overall praised the game as mostly "creative, fun, entertaining, and best of all, challenging." Macworld named 3 in Three as runner-up to Tesserae in the Best Brain Game category of its 1991 Macintosh Game Hall of Fame.

MacUser awarded 3 in Three five out of five mice, claiming that Cliff Johnson had "achieved a new level of weirdness" with the game's variety of puzzles. MacUser called the game's plot "a bit Tron-esque", with abundant humor and infuriating puzzles. The review praised the game's graphics, sound, animation, and stability. MacUser named 3 in Three best game in its 1991 Editors' Choice Awards, ahead of Spaceship Warlock and Spectre.

The Chicago Tribune named 3 in Three the best brain teaser game of 1990 and said that it surpassed previous Cliff Johnson games "with superb animation and intricately connected puzzles."

Games magazine included 3 in Three in its "The Games 100" feature as the best new puzzle game of 1991. Games called the game "as witty and challenging as [Cliff Johnson's] earlier head-scratchers," with improved storyline and graphics.

Bob LeVitus recommended 3 in Three as a mind-boggling "tour de force of animation and sound" in The Macintosh Reader. Gaming historian Richard Moss likened the visual style of 3 in Three to "an interactive Saul Bass advertisement" and noted that the game's puzzles had evolved from the paper-and-pencil adaptions of Cliff Johnson's previous games The Fool's Errand and At the Carnival to "computer-native" designs.

The Macintosh Bible Guide to Games said that Cliff Johnson took his brilliant game design of The Fool's Errand to a new level with 3 in Three, calling it "one of the better puzzle compilations available."

=== Awards ===
- 1991 MacUser Game of the Year
- 1991 Macworld Game Hall of Fame, Best Brain Game runner-up
- 1991 Games Best Puzzle Game of the Year
