= Forbidden Solitaire =

- Developers: Grey Alien Games; Night Signal Entertainment
- Publishers: Night Signal Entertainment; Grey Alien Games
- Platform: Steam
- Release: April 30, 2026
- Genres: Indie, strategy

Forbidden Solitaire is an indie strategy game that was developed and published by Grey Alien Games and Night Signal Entertainment. The game was released to Steam in April 2026. Its central storyline focuses on the discovery of a controversial PC game from the 1990s, which was banned due to fears that it contained Satanic themes that negatively impacted players.

== Gameplay ==
In the game players must play multiple rounds of solitaire while making their way through a mysterious tower. Cards can be stacked in numerical order and players can earn coins to purchase various items to make gameplay easier. Some rounds are played against opponents, where matching more cards allows the player to deal more damage.

== Synopsis ==
The game centers upon Will Roberta, a young man who purchases a copy of a controversial, banned PC game from the 1990s, Forbidden Solitaire. Players portrayed an unnamed person exploring a mysterious tower in search of forbidden magical knowledge and power. Upon returning home he immediately brags to his sister Emily about his find before playing the game. She begins researching the history of the game and discovers that the game was pulled from sale due to complaints of faulty gameplay and rumors that it contains Satanic themes that cursed players.

As Will continues to play he uncovers secrets about the parent company, Heartblade Interactive by way of conversations that occasionally play. Its CEO Lucas had originally wanted to create an extremely sophisticated MMORPG and hired a new programmer, Shannon, to help in this task. The two initially get along and at one point Lucas notices that Shannon has seemingly programmed a separate game, Forbidden Solitaire. Over time it becomes obvious that Lucas had promised more than he could deliver and the game's budget runs out. Faced with sponsors demanding either the promised game or repayment, Lucas decides to forcibly take Forbidden Solitaire from Shannon and publish it despite her desperately trying to stop him.

Meanwhile, Emily's research uncovers information about the demon Balor. The demonic entity would offer players immortality if they won, trapping them in his cards if they were successful. Balor was only stopped by the intervention of a wizard that trapped the entity in a prison. This did not kill the demon, who continued to try and entice people to free it. The demon's prison appears to shift over time, at one point turning into an arcade game. Emily further discovers that Shannon was part of a cult called The Keepers, which was tasked with safeguarding any items through which Balor or other demons may surface. Having failed at her task, Shannon commits ritual suicide. It is implied that her soul has transferred into the game and is the source of the conversations Will hears as well as the glitch opponent that tries to stop Will from progressing.

The game has two endings. If the player chooses to accept the offer of immortality, Will's spirit is taken inside of the game and his physical body dies. This also allows the entity to use the game to bring in new victims. If the player chooses to decline, Will must battle the entity. Successfully beating it removes its influence over the game, so that no other players will be targeted.

== Release ==
Forbidden Solitaire was released to Steam on 30 April 2026.

== Reception ==
Forbidden Solitaire has received positive reviews from Bloody Disgusting and The Guardian. Both outlets praised the game for its aesthetics and gameplay. Polygon also reviewed the game, stating that they "found all this more funny than scary, but either way it's a mood, and as an evocation of a certain grimy '90s PC gaming aesthetic, it's devastatingly accurate."
