= Off Road (video game) =

2008 video game

- European cover art featuring a Range Rover Sport and Ford Escape
- Developer: Razorworks
- Publisher: Empire Interactive
- Producers: Benedict Wilkins (PS2/PSP/Wii versions); Simon Davis (Wii version)
- Designers: Luigi Fusco; Steve Kirby
- Series: Ford Racing
- Platforms: Microsoft Windows; PlayStation 2 PlayStation Portable; Wii
- Release: PC: EU: March 21, 2008; NA: September 18, 2008; PlayStation 2: EU: March 20, 2008; NA: July 29, 2008; PlayStation Portable: EU: March 20, 2008; NA: July 29, 2008; Wii: EU: August 15, 2008; NA: September 16, 2008
- Genre: Racing
- Modes: Single-player, multiplayer

Off Road (released in North America as Ford Racing Off Road) is a 2008 racing video game developed by Razorworks and published by Empire Interactive. It is the seventh and final game of the Ford Racing series. It is also the only game in the series to feature vehicles by Land Rover, which was owned by Ford Motor Company at the time. The game was released for the personal computer (PC), PlayStation 2 (PS2), PlayStation Portable (PSP), and the Nintendo Wii. The game received mostly negative reviews.

== Gameplay ==
Off Road features 12 tracks, and 18 vehicles from Ford and Land Rover. The game features five game modes: Quick Race, Career, Tournament, Arcade, and Multiplayer. Career mode is the game's main mode, in which the player races to unlock new vehicles, tracks and race types. Tournament mode is a smaller version of Career mode, minus the ability to unlock new vehicles. Quick Race allows the player to begin a race on a limited number of tracks. In Arcade mode, the player can race with vehicles, tracks and race types that have been unlocked. The PC, PS2 and Wii versions include a two-player option.

== Development and release ==
The game was announced in July 2007, with the tentative title of Ford Off Road and a release date scheduled for late November. It would be the first game in the Ford Racing series to feature off-road driving and the first to feature vehicles from Land Rover, which was owned by Ford at the time. The game was to be known as Ford Off Road for its U.S. release, while it would be titled Off Road in other regions.

The game was released in 2008:

In Europe, Off Road was released on March 20 for the PS2 and PSP. The PC version was released in Europe the following day, followed by a European release for the Wii on August 15.

In the United States, the game was released as Ford Racing Off Road on July 29 for the PS2 and PSP, followed by a Wii release on September 16. The PC version was released on September 18.

== Reception ==
Reception

Aggregate score
| Aggregator | Score | | | |
| Aggregator | PC | PS2 | PSP | Wii |
|---|---|---|---|---|
| Metacritic | 39/100 | 37/100 | 47/100 | 37/100 |

Review scores
| Publication | Score | | | |
| Publication | PC | PS2 | PSP | Wii |
|---|---|---|---|---|
| Eurogamer | | 4/10 | 5/10 | 3/10 |
| GameZone | 5.2/10 | | | |
| IGN | 3.5/10 | 3.5/10 | | |
| PlayStation Official Magazine – UK | | 30/100 | 60/100 | |
| PC PowerPlay | 30/100 | | | |
| VideoGamer.com | | 6/10 | | 3/10 |
| Pocket Gamer | | | 4/10 | |

According to Metacritic, the game received "generally unfavorable reviews".

GameZone wrote about the PC version: "In the end Ford Racing: Off Road is a decent racing title that does what it should - offer a fun racing gameplay experience. It doesn't excel at offering a ton of features or incredible visuals, but then again it doesn't need to. There are plenty of gamers out there just looking for a fun racing game to play for a few minutes a day and Ford Racing fits the bill". Sam Bishop of IGN reviewed the PC and PS2 versions. Bishop praised the graphics but criticized the poor controls, the similar game modes, and the music and limited sound effects. Bishop wrote: "With the more serious sims now delivering literally hundreds of cars, the allure of having a handful of different makes from the same manufacturer isn't nearly as strong".

PC PowerPlay wrote: "Even without the numerous glitches and bugs the underlying game is so poorly realised that we find it hard to recommend this to even the most die-hard of Ford fans". Official PlayStation 2 Magazine-UK wrote that the PSP version "lacks the spark of passion or layer of imagination that would have made it stand out". For the PS2 version, the magazine wrote that "it's too slow, too ugly and too pricey for what it is".

Dave Harrison of Pocket Gamer reviewed the PSP version. Harrison criticized the race tracks and the artificial intelligence (AI) of the "dumb and overly aggressive" rival drivers, and wrote: "The reason it's hard to be positive about Off Road is that even when it works and there are no gripes as such, it's still a horribly average experience, almost as though there's been a concerted effort to produce mediocrity".

Simon Parkin of Eurogamer reviewed the PSP version: "For a game designed to appeal specifically to one type of car fan there's not much in the way of in-depth stats or tweaking". Parkin concluded that the game "is lacking in any sort of interesting game design to mark it out". Dan Whitehead, also of Eurogamer, reviewed the PS2 version and called it "the latest in the inexplicably tenacious Ford Racing series", stating that it "continues that product line's tradition of bland design, minimal excitement and technical under-achievement". Whitehead criticized all the vehicles for driving sluggishly and for looking "cheap and fake". Whitehead also criticized the fact that the vehicles do not show any damage or dirt. Ellie Gibson of Eurogamer, reviewing the Wii version, criticized the controls, the tedious gameplay, and wrote that the game had "ugly visuals, terrible AI and pathetic physics. Not all of the cars handle badly; some of them handle appallingly, and as the game progresses you can unlock vehicles which handle awfully, shoddily, dreadfully and horrifically".

Tom Atkinson of VideoGamer.com reviewed the Wii version and criticized the music and graphics, while writing as "just try straying from the designated route for a second and you'll quickly hit an invisible wall, discovering that this game goes about as far off the tracks as your average monorail". Roy Kimber of VideoGamer.com reviewed the PS2 version and considered it to be an average racing game: "It does have a budget price tag though, so it's worth a look if you don't set your expectations too high and just want a simple, easy-to-get-into racer to keep you occupied while you wait for something better to come along".
