= Ford Racing 3 =

2004 video game

- PlayStation 2 cover art featuring Ford GT, Ford Mustang, Ford Focus, and Ford F-150
- Developers: Razorworks (console and PC versions); Visual Impact (DS/GBA versions)
- Publishers: NA: 2K Games; WW: Empire Interactive; PAL: ZOO Digital (DS, GBA)
- Producers: Steve Metcalf (home console versions); Antoine Voisin (DS version)
- Designer: Terry Watts
- Composers: Muddy Funkers; Paul Stroud; Tim Follin
- Platforms: Microsoft Windows; PlayStation 2 Game Boy Advance; Nintendo DS; Xbox
- Release: October 29, 2004: PlayStation 2, Xbox, Windows; EU: October 29, 2004; AU: November 4, 2004; NA: April 5, 2005 (PC); NA: March 22, 2005 (PS2, Xbox) Game Boy Advance; NA: November 2005 Nintendo DS; NA: December 7, 2005
- Genre: Racing
- Modes: single player, multiplayer

Ford Racing 3 is a racing video game published by Empire Interactive, 2K, and ZOO Digital. It is the third game in the Ford Racing series, and was released in Europe in October 2004, for Microsoft Windows, PlayStation 2 and Xbox. In the United States, the game was released on the same platforms the following year, followed by releases later that year for the Game Boy Advance and Nintendo DS. Visual Impact Productions developed the GBA and DS versions, while Razorworks developed the other versions. The game received mixed reviews, critics were divided in its soundtrack, physics and overall content and gameplay.

== Gameplay ==
The home console and GBA versions feature 55 Ford vehicles, while the DS version has 26 Ford vehicles. The console version includes the Ford Competition and Ford Challenge modes. Ford Competition, a single-player mode, consists of 14 tournaments, each one made up of races using only certain types of vehicles. Ford Challenge consists of various race events in which certain challenges must be completed to progress to the next event. Four challenges exist for each vehicle class, with an easy, medium, and hard difficulty setting for each challenge. Additionally, the game features the Ford Collection mode, in which the player designs custom challenges by selecting a track, conditions, and vehicles.

The DS version includes the main Career mode, which is divided into 14 race tournaments, each with a different vehicle class and consisting of various race types, including elimination races. Tournaments contain up to six races each. A certain number of points are awarded to each racer depending on what place they came in at the end of each race. The racer with the most points at the end of the tournament is the winner. The game also includes 22 various challenges, categorized by vehicle class. Each vehicle has a single challenge. The player begins the game with three vehicles and a few race tracks, while other vehicles and tracks must be unlocked by completing challenges and competitions. The DS version also includes a Ford Collection mode, consisting of 10 different types of races, which the player can win to unlock additional content.

The PC version supports six-player network player through a local area network or the Internet, while the Xbox version supports online multiplayer for a maximum of six players through Xbox Live. The GBA version includes a multiplayer option with the use of a Game Link Cable. The DS version also has a multiplayer option, which requires each player to have a copy of the game.

== Reception ==
Reception

Aggregate score
Aggregator	Score				
Aggregator	DS	GBA	PC	PS2	Xbox
Metacritic	49/100	N/A	N/A	50/100	58/100

Review scores
Publication	Score				
Publication	DS	GBA	PC	PS2	Xbox
GameSpot	4.6/10	N/A	N/A	N/A	6.6/10
GameSpy	N/A	N/A	N/A	N/A	2.5/5
GameZone	N/A	3.5/10	N/A	N/A	6.5/10
IGN	5/10	N/A	N/A	4.5/10	4.5/10
Jeuxvideo.com	N/A	N/A	11/20	11/20	11/20
Official U.S. PlayStation Magazine	N/A	N/A	N/A	3/5	N/A
Official Xbox Magazine (US)	N/A	N/A	N/A	N/A	5.5/10
PALGN	5/10	N/A	N/A	4/10	N/A
TeamXbox	N/A	N/A	N/A	N/A	7.5/10
X-Play	N/A	N/A	N/A	N/A	3/5
Detroit Free Press	N/A	N/A	N/A	N/A	2/4

The PlayStation 2 and Xbox versions received mixed reviews, while the DS version received unfavorable reviews, according to the review aggregation website Metacritic.

Official U.S. PlayStation Magazine wrote: "If you're a Ford nut, you've got a nice little virtual showroom here, with a competent racing game to boot." Tom Price of Official Xbox Magazine praised the variety of vehicles, stating that it "is probably the biggest draw", but criticized the sound and outdated graphics. Official Xbox Magazine UK criticized the soundtrack and wrote that "it's not by any means the worst driving game ever made", but that "much like the Ford brand itself, there isn't really much in the way of glitz or glamour to it either."

Douglass C. Perry of IGN reviewed the PS2 and Xbox versions. Perry criticized the graphics and music, and concluded: "My first and final impressions of this game? Blech. Ford Racing 3 is not a travesty, but it's not any good either. The best thing that can be said about it is it's filled with 55 Fords. And if you like Fords, well, they're here for you. But I cannot say that you'll have fun or find any kind of thrill driving them, looking at them, or enjoy collecting them, which is kind of the whole point behind this cheap-ass, mediocre, and minimal effort." Scott Alan Marriott of X-Play praised the Xbox version for its graphics and scenic race tracks, as well as its support of Xbox Live, but he criticized the controls, writing that "the cars and trucks don't grip the road tightly at all, resulting in a loose style of driving that often feels like you are nudging a boat on water instead of steering radial tires on asphalt."

Greg Mueller of GameSpot reviewed the Xbox version and wrote: "Despite the license and some interesting gameplay modes, Ford Racing 3 comes off feeling generic and far less distinct than the real-life vehicles the game attempts to capture." Mueller further stated that the game "is a passable choice for fans of arcade-style racing because of its forgiving race physics and variety of gameplay modes. However, the game hasn't changed much since the previous installment in the series, and sim fans will be disappointed with the simplistic gameplay and weak vehicle customization options. Additionally, there are already a ton of arcade-style racing games on the market that do all of this better. The game does have some amusing moments, but it's ultimately a forgettable racing experience."

Mueller later reviewed the DS version and wrote that "while the console versions of Ford Racing 3 have halfway decent racing mechanics and online play, the DS version has neither of these things, and it looks ugly too. The end result is a stiff, lifeless husk of a racing game that will disappoint even the most forgiving of Ford fanatics." IGN reviewed the DS version and felt that it was better than Visual Impact's previous game, Burnout Legends, while writing: "Ford Racing 3 is severely mediocre, but still not nearly as bad as some of the racers that hit the Nintendo DS in the past few weeks."

David Chapman of GameSpy criticized the Xbox version's outdated graphics, generic sound effects: "The worst part though has to be the small selection of cheesy rock music that plays over and over until your ears bleed. Thankfully, the Xbox version supports custom soundtracks, so the torture is a short-lived affair." Chapman concluded that the game "winds up being a victim of its own mediocrity." Nate Ahearn of TeamXbox praised the gameplay and the option of customizable soundtracks, but criticized the sound effects. Code Cowboy of GameZone, reviewing the Xbox version, criticized the soundtrack but praised the gameplay and graphics, and concluded: "It's a simple, Ford-glorifying collection of racing adventure. It could be better in a lot of ways. There are a lot of faults to this game, but in all it's very playable and does provide some genuine fun." Code Cowboy later wrote about the GBA version: "The tracks look great — as long as you are not moving, which makes for a boring race! Once you engage in the race itself, your car is a pixilated mess and the scenery comes and goes at random. One moment you are heading towards a barricade, then it disappears…. only to reappear just in time for you to strike it. All along the courses, the scenes change, morph and vanish, which leads to a frustrating and confusing experience. Although some of the cars are detailed enough to tell what model it is supposed to be, most of them are vague, generic blocks with wheels."
