= David Blaine =

American illusionist and extreme performer

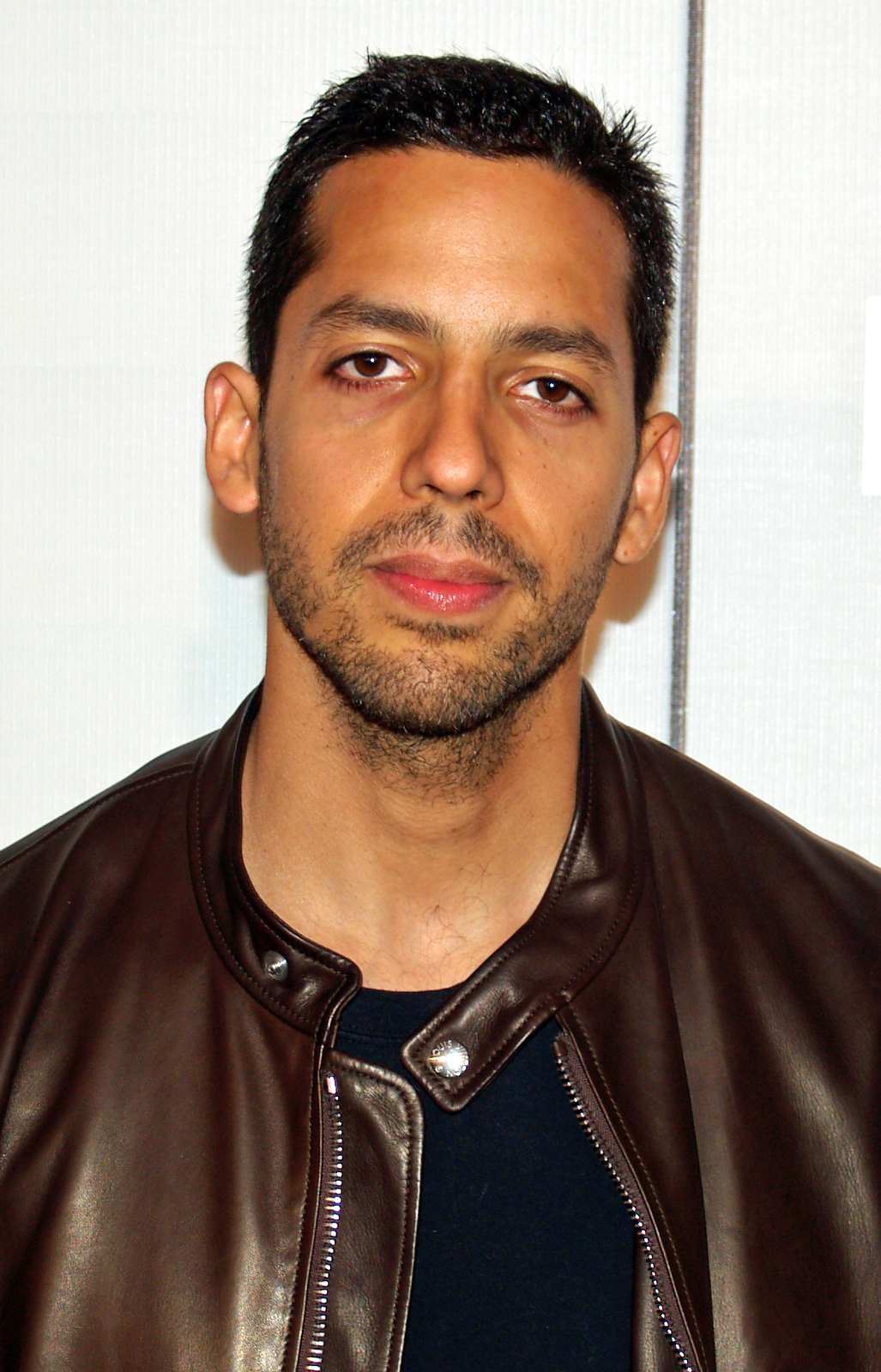
- Blaine in 2008
- Born: David Blaine White; April 4, 1973 (age 53); New York City, U.S.
- Occupations: Illusionist; endurance artist
- Years active: 1997–present
- Partner: Alizée Guinochet (2008–2014)
- Children: 1

YouTube information
- Channel: David Blaine
- Years active: 2005–present
- Genres: Magic; Stunts
- Subscribers: 1.86 million
- Views: 354 million
- Last updated: August 4, 2026
- Website: Official website

David Blaine (born David Blaine White; April 4, 1973) is an American magician, mentalist, and endurance performer. Born in New York City, Blaine became interested in magic at a very young age. He gained prominence in 1997, when his first television special, David Blaine: Street Magic, aired on ABC. That year, he also appeared in Magic Man. He later starred in the television specials David Blaine: Real or Magic (2013), Beyond Magic (2016), and The Magic Way (2020).

Known for his dangerous stunts, in 2008 he attempted to break the Guinness World Record for breath holding. He succeeded in holding his breath for 17 minutes 4 seconds, setting a new world record for oxygen-assisted static apnea. He is the author of Mysterious Stranger: A Book of Magic (2002), an autobiography and armchair treasure hunt with instructions on performing magic tricks.

== Early life ==
Blaine was born David Blaine White on April 4, 1973, in Brooklyn, the son of a single mother, Patrice White, a teacher who was of Russian Jewish ancestry, and father William Perez, who is a Vietnam War veteran of Puerto Rican and Italian descent.

When Blaine was four years old, he saw a magician performing magic on the subway. This sparked a lifelong interest for him. He was raised by his mother and attended a Montessori school in Brooklyn. They later moved to Little Falls, New Jersey, where he attended Passaic Valley Regional High School.

According to one account, his mother developed cancer when Blaine was 15 and died when he was 20. According to another, "When Blaine was 21, his mother was stricken with cancer and passed away in 1994." When Blaine was 17 years old, he moved to Manhattan.

== Stunts and specials ==
=== Street Magic (1997) and Magic Man (1998) ===
On May 19, 1997, Blaine's first television special, David Blaine: Street Magic, aired on ABC. "It really, really does break new ground," said Penn Jillette of Penn & Teller. When asked about his performance style, Blaine explained, "I'd like to bring magic back to the place it used to be 100 years ago." Time commented, "His deceptively low-key, ultracool manner leaves spectators more amazed than if he'd razzle-dazzled."

In Magic Man, aired January 16, 1998, Blaine is shown traveling across the country, entertaining unsuspecting pedestrians in Atlantic City, Compton, Dallas, the Mojave Desert, New York City, and San Francisco, recorded by a small crew with handheld cameras. Jon Racherbaumer commented: "Make no mistake about it, the focus of this show, boys and girls, is not Blaine. It is really about theatrical proxemics; about the show-within-a-show and the spontaneous, visceral reactions of people being astonished." USA Today called Blaine the "hottest name in magic right now".

=== Buried Alive (1999) ===
On April 5, 1999, Blaine was entombed in an underground plastic box underneath a 3-ton water-filled tank for seven days, across from Trump Place on 68th St. and Riverside Boulevard, as part of a stunt titled "Buried Alive".

On the final day of the stunt, April 12, hundreds of news teams were stationed at the site for the coffin opening. A team of construction workers removed a portion of the 75 cubic feet (2.1 m^{3}) of gravel surrounding the 6-foot (1.8-metre) deep coffin before a crane lifted the water tank. Blaine emerged and told the crowd, "I saw something very prophetic ... a vision of every race, every religion, every age group banding together, and that made all this worthwhile." BBC News stated, "The 26-year-old magician has outdone his hero, Harry Houdini, who had planned a similar feat but died in 1926 before he could perform it."

=== Frozen in Time (2000) ===
On November 27, 2000, Blaine performed a stunt called Frozen in Time, where he attempted and failed to stand in a large block of ice located in Times Square, New York City for 72 hours. It was covered on a TV special. He was lightly dressed and appeared to be shivering even before the blocks of ice were placed around him. A tube supplied him with air and water, while his urine was removed with another tube. He was encased in the box of ice for 63 hours, 42 minutes, and 15 seconds before being removed with chainsaws. The ice was transparent and resting on an elevated platform to show that he was actually inside the ice the entire time. He was removed from the ice and taken to a hospital due to fears he might be going into shock. The New York Times reported, "The magician who emerged from the increasingly unstable ice box seemed a shadow of the confident, robust, shirtless fellow who entered two days before." Blaine later said it took a month to fully recover and that he had no plans to attempt a stunt of this difficulty in the future. In 2010, a magician from Israel named Hezi Dean broke Blaine's record when he was encased in a block of ice for 66 hours.

=== Vertigo (2002) ===
On May 22, 2002, a crane lifted Blaine onto an 80 ft (24 m) high and 22 in (0.56 m) wide pillar in Bryant Park, New York City. He was not harnessed to the pillar, although there were two retractable handles on either side of him to grasp in the event of harsh weather. He remained on the pillar for 35 hours. He ended the feat by jumping down onto a landing platform made out of a 12 ft (3.7 m) high pile of cardboard boxes and sustained a mild concussion. He later said in his 2009 TED Talk that he had had severe hallucinations in the final hours of this stunt, causing the buildings and structures around him to look like animal heads.

=== Above the Below (2003) ===
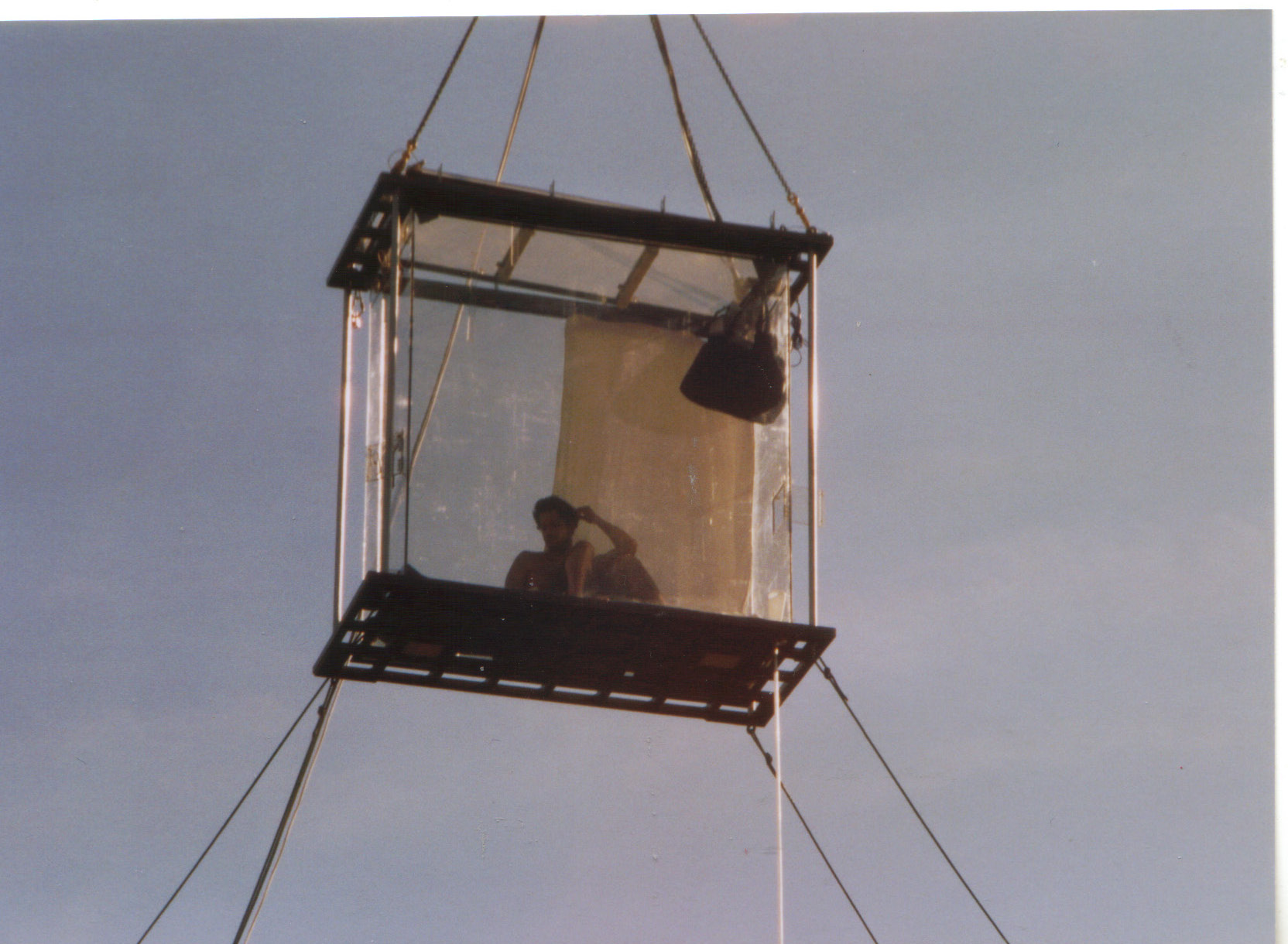
David Blaine, Above the Below

On September 5, 2003, Blaine began an endurance stunt in which he was sealed inside a transparent Plexiglas box. The case was suspended 30 feet (9.1 metres) in the air next to Potters Fields Park on the south bank of the River Thames in London, and measured 3 feet (0.9 metres) by 7 feet (2.1 metres) by 7 feet (2.1 metres). A webcam was installed inside the box so that viewers could observe his progress. The stunt lasted 44 days, during which Blaine drank 1.2 US gallons (4.5 litres) of water per day and did not eat.

The stunt was the subject of media attention, The Times reporting that "1,614 articles in the British press have made reference to the exploit." Then-US president George W. Bush referred to Blaine's stunt in a speech at the Whitehall Palace in London, saying, "The last noted American to visit London stayed in a glass box dangling over the Thames. A few might have been happy to provide similar arrangements for me." Despite the media coverage, the British public were less impressed than previous American audiences and a number of spectators threw food and other items towards the box, including eggs, lemons, paint-filled balloons and golf balls. A McDonald's hamburger was flown up to the box by a remote-controlled helicopter as a taunt, drums were played at night to prevent Blaine from sleeping, and the Evening Standard reported that one man was arrested for attempting to cut the cable supplying water to Blaine's box. One critic claimed Blaine suffered from a God complex and described the stunt as "really poor [...] it's embarrassing to other magicians".

On September 25, BBC News reported that "if his endurance test is real rather than an elaborate illusion", then Blaine's claim of tasting pear drops indicates he is advancing through the first stage of starvation. A medical doctor said that the taste is caused by ketones, which are produced when the body burns fat reserves.

The stunt ended on October 19, and Blaine emerged in tears saying "I love you all!" and was subsequently hospitalized. The New England Journal of Medicine published a paper that documented his 44-day fast and stated his re-feeding was perhaps the most dangerous part of the stunt. The study reported, "He lost 24.5 kg (54 lb)‍—‌25 percent of his original body weight‍—‌and his body mass index dropped from 29.0 to 21.6. His appearance and body-mass index after his fast would not by themselves have alerted us to the risks of refeeding. Despite cautious management, he had hypophosphatemia and fluid retention, important elements of the refeeding syndrome."

=== Drowned Alive (2006) ===
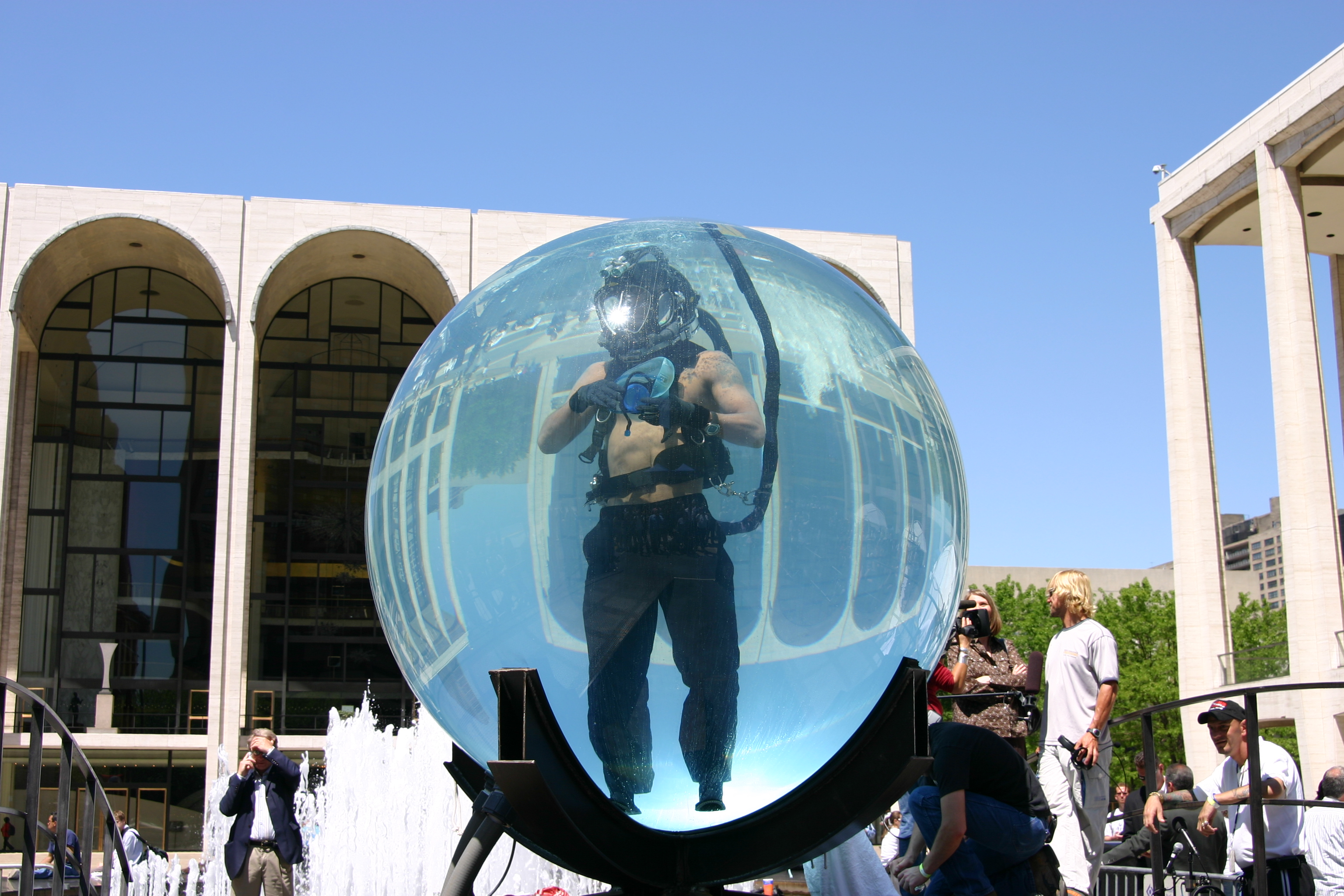
Blaine performing the Drowned Alive stunt at Lincoln Center

On May 1, 2006, Blaine began his Drowned Alive stunt, which lasted seven days and involved a submersion in an 8 feet (2.4 m) diameter, water-filled sphere containing isotonic saline in front of the Lincoln Center in New York City. During the stunt, he sustained kidney and liver damage. At the end of the stunt, Blaine attempted to free himself from handcuffs and chains after exiting the sphere. After the stunt, Blaine entered into an agreement with researchers at Yale University to monitor him in order to study the human physiological reaction to prolonged submersion.

=== Revolution (2006) ===
On November 21, 2006, Blaine began his Revolution stunt, where he was shackled to a rotating gyroscope without food or water, intending to escape within 16 hours. Blaine completed the stunt 52 hours later.

=== Guinness World Records (2008) ===
Blaine appeared on the April 30, 2008, episode of The Oprah Winfrey Show to attempt to break the Guinness World Record for oxygen-assisted static apnea, following his failure to break the then-current record of unassisted static apnea in his previous attempt Drowned Alive. The previous record was set by Peter Colat of Switzerland on February 10, 2008.

Before entering the 1,800-US-gallon (6.8-cubic-metre) water tank, Blaine spent 23 minutes inhaling pure oxygen. Blaine held his breath for 17 minutes 4-1/2 seconds, surpassing Colat's previous mark of 16 minutes 32 seconds, setting a new Guinness World Record that stood until September 19, 2008, when it was surpassed by German diver Tom Sietas who during an episode of the American talk show Live with Regis and Kelly, held his breath for 17 minutes, 19 seconds.

=== Dive of Death (2008) ===
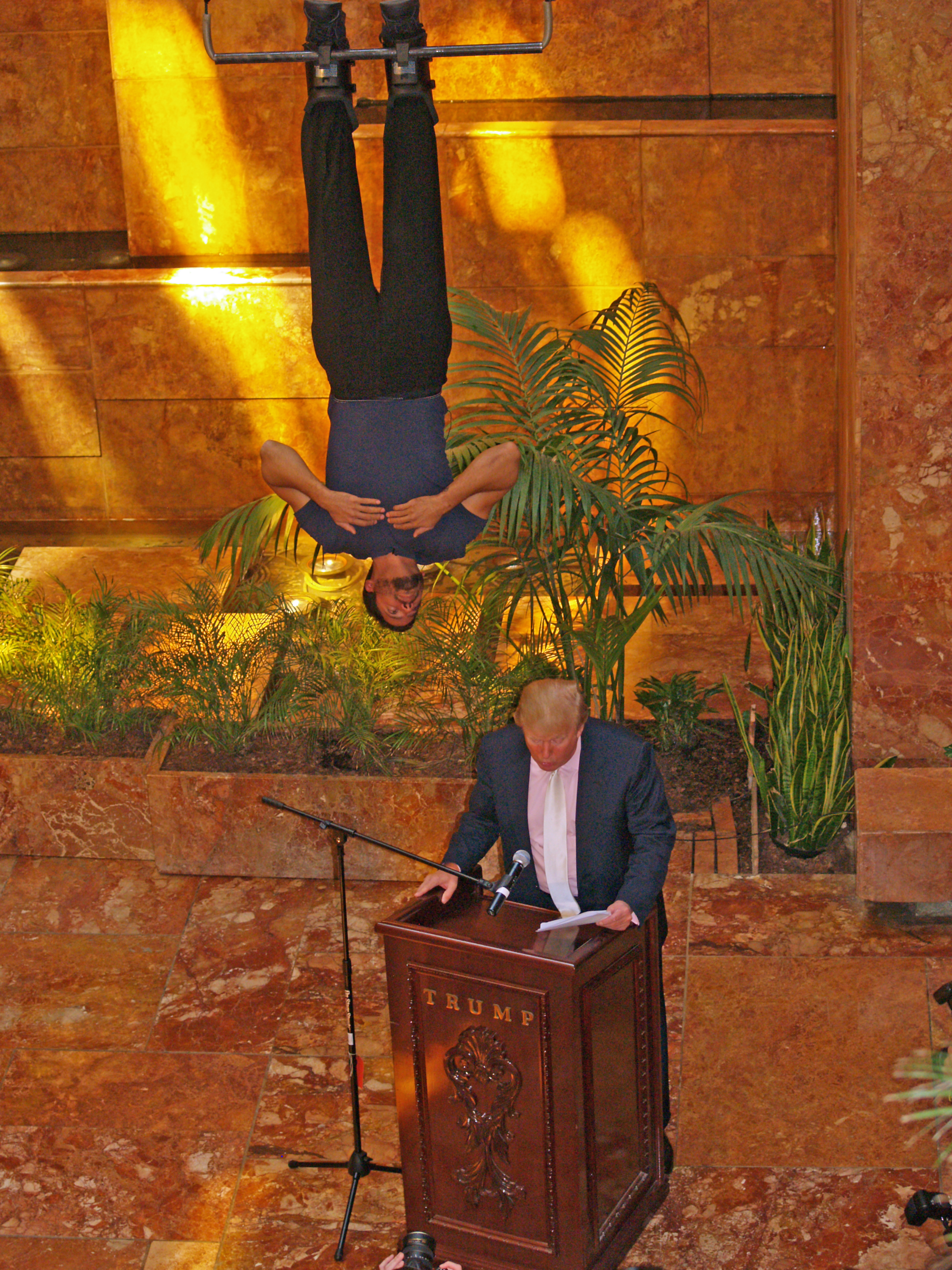
Blaine with Donald Trump announcing Blaine's next event in the atrium of Trump Tower in September 2008

On September 18, 2008, Blaine announced his The Upside Down Man performance with Donald Trump. Blaine planned to hang upside down without a safety net for 60 hours. On September 22, Blaine began his stunt Dive of Death, hanging over Wollman Rink in Central Park and interacting with fans by lowering himself upside down. He pulled himself up to drink fluid and restore normal circulation. Reportedly, Blaine risked blindness and other maladies in the stunt. He was criticized when, only hours into the endurance challenge, he was seen standing on a waiting crane platform, not upside down as expected. During the stunt, he came down once an hour for a medical check and to use the bathroom.

=== What Is Magic? (2010) ===
In this 42-minute television special that aired on April 18, 2010, Blaine performed a stunt catching a .22 caliber bullet fired from a rifle into a small metal cup in his mouth.

=== Electrified: One Million Volts Always On (2012) ===
On October 5, 2012, Blaine began performing a 72-hour endurance stunt called Electrified: One Million Volts Always On atop a 22-foot-tall (6.7 m) pillar on Pier 54 in New York City, which was streamed live on YouTube. During the stunt, Blaine stood on the pillar surrounded by seven Tesla coils producing an electric discharge of one million volts or more continuously. The coils were directed at Blaine for the entirety of the endurance stunt, during which he did not eat or sleep. He wore 34 pounds (15 kilograms) of gear, including a chainmail Faraday suit, designed to prevent electric current from traveling through the body. John Belcher, a physics professor from the Massachusetts Institute of Technology, reportedly said, "He has a conducting suit, all the current is going through the suit, nothing through his body. There is no danger in this that I see."

At night, Blaine shivered uncontrollably from the inclement weather. The New York Times published an article describing the science behind Blaine's stunt. Musicians Pharrell Williams and Andrew W.K. performed solos on a keyboard which controlled the electric discharge.

The event concluded on October 8, 2012, at 8:44 pm. Blaine was able to walk away with assistance and was transported to a hospital for a medical check. Blaine donated two of the Tesla coils to the Liberty Science Center in Jersey City, New Jersey, to be exhibited on permanent display.

=== Real or Magic (2013) ===
In 2013, Blaine starred in a 90-minute ABC television special, David Blaine: Real or Magic, on November 19, 2013. The special, directed by Matthew Akers, featured Blaine performing magic for celebrities and public figures. Real or Magic achieved a 2.5 rating in the 18–49 age bracket, and posted the best numbers in the 9:30–11:00 pm time slot for ABC's 2013 season.

=== Beyond Magic (2016) ===
On November 15, 2016, ABC aired Beyond Magic, a 42-minute television special in which Blaine performs magic for various public figures. Among the featured stunts is one in which Blaine seemingly catches a .22 caliber bullet in a small metal cup held between a gum shield in his mouth. The bullet catch trick was performed live on stage in front of 20,000 people in an August 2015 Las Vegas performance in which Blaine fired the gun himself. Blaine's mouthguard broke during the performance. Since then, Blaine has never performed the stunt again.

=== The Magic Way (2020) ===
On April 1, 2020, Blaine starred in David Blaine: The Magic Way, which aired on ABC. The special consisted of various close-up magic acts, performing card tricks through video chat, and also performing in-person for many famous athletes, actors, and other celebrities as well as ordinary citizens. The special also includes performances by Blaine's daughter.

=== Ascension (2020) ===
In 2020, Blaine performed the David Blaine Ascension stunt, which involved him floating while holding on to a cluster of 52 helium-filled balloons using a harness. The stunt took place on the morning of September 2, 2020, in Page, Arizona, and was streamed live on YouTube as a YouTube Original program. Blaine managed to get to an altitude of 24,900 feet (7.6 km) above sea level (more than 20,000 feet (6.1 km) above ground level), before letting go of his balloons and parachuting down towards a flat ravine close to the initially planned landing zone. He landed successfully and without being harmed.

=== Do Not Attempt (2025) ===
In 2025, Blaine teamed with Hulu and Disney+ for the series entitled David Blaine: Do Not Attempt, in which he trains under an array of people with death-defying skills and performs several feats around the world.

== Live tour ==
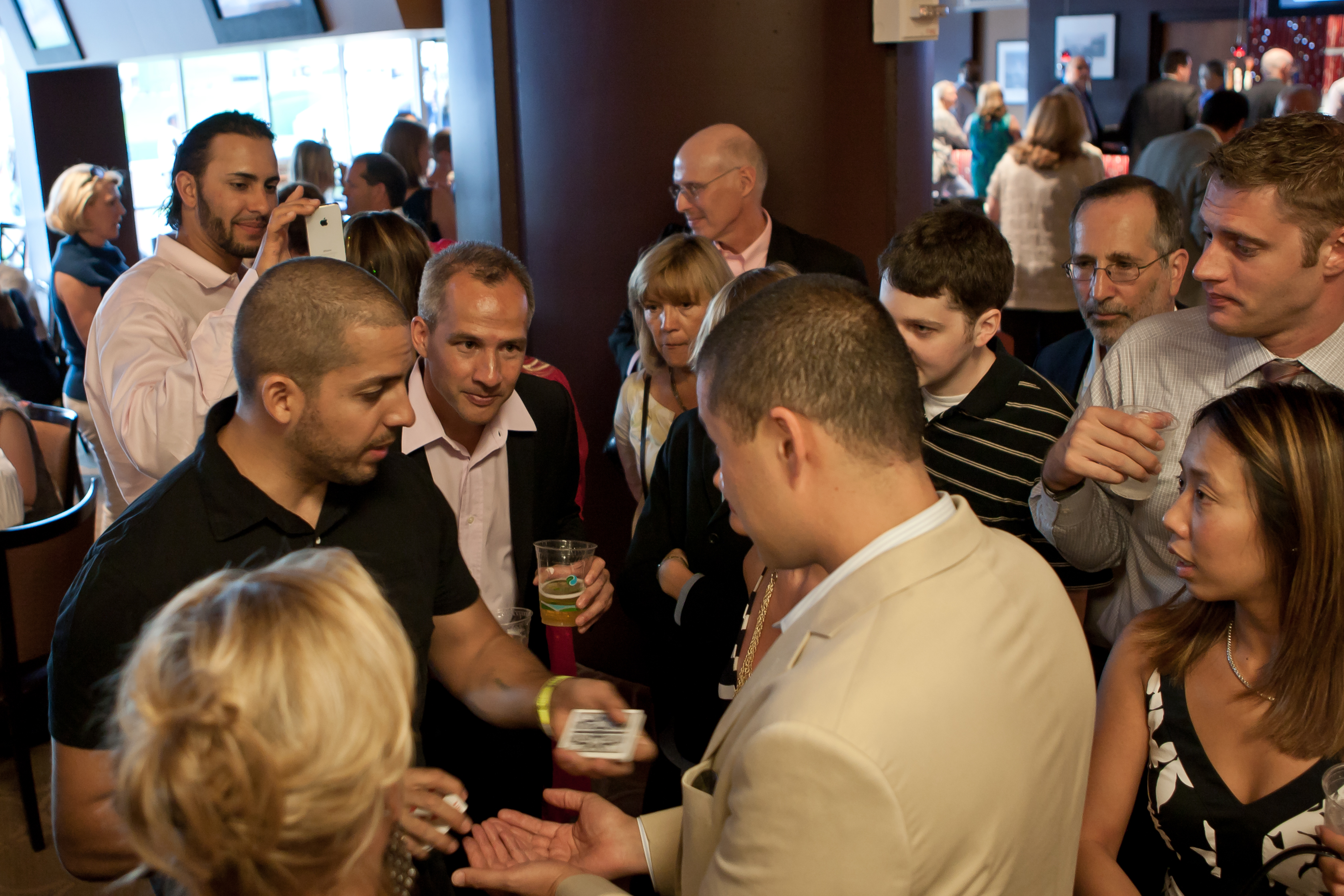
David Blaine meeting his fans

In 2014, Blaine embarked on his first ever live tour, in which he took his tricks and stunts on the road to audiences in the Middle East and North America.

In June 2019, Blaine brought his 'Real or Magic' tour to the UK & Ireland, in which he performed in Edinburgh, Manchester, Birmingham, Bournemouth and London, throughout June.

Blaine had planned to take the bullet catch trick on tour, although, after the successful/unsuccessful live attempt, in the MGM Grand Arena, in 2015, he shelved this idea and went with the main stunt of the underwater breath hold for these shows. This was the stunt he carried out in his 2006 'Drowned Alive' TV special and of which he also performed again, in a live world record attempt, in 2009, on the Oprah Winfrey Show.

== Las Vegas residency ==
In September 2022, Blaine began his first Las Vegas residency, with his 'David Blaine Live' show at the Resorts World hotel, which had an extended run through to June 2023. After the success of this stint on the strip, he then announced his 'Impossible' residency at The Encore theatre, Wynn, would begin in December 2023. This show is still running today, with Blaine performing an array of his favourite tricks and stunts over the course of three shows, on 3 days, of each month.

== Other work ==
=== Writing ===
On October 29, 2002, Villard published Mysterious Stranger: A Book of Magic, an autobiography and armchair treasure hunt with instructions on performing magic tricks. The treasure hunt was created by game designer Cliff Johnson and solved by Sherri Skanes on March 20, 2004.

=== Philanthropy and charity work ===
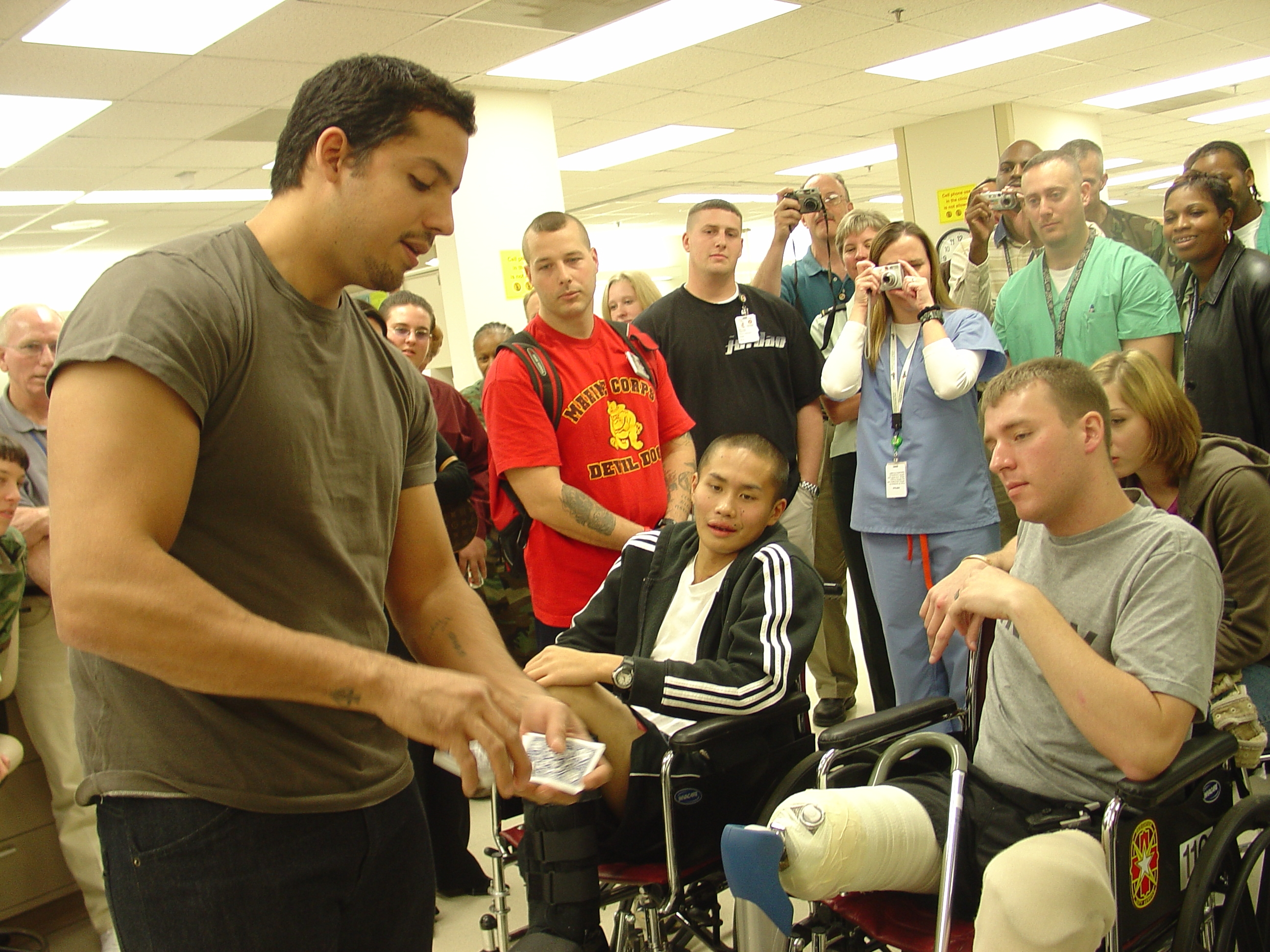
Blaine performing for patients of the Brooke Army Medical Center, 2005

In November 2006, Blaine performed a stunt in New York's Times Square in support of The Salvation Army. After 52 hours, Blaine escaped from the shackles that had held him in a spinning gyroscope suspended above the ground. Blaine said this stunt was particularly important to him since The Salvation Army had provided him with clothing while he was growing up.

On January 15, 2010, Blaine returned to Times Square to perform "Magic for Haiti", a performance lasting 72 hours which raised nearly US$100,000 for Haiti earthquake relief.

Blaine also donated two $1 million Tesla coils to Liberty Science Center after performing a massive electricity stunt.

== Personal life ==
Blaine and his former girlfriend, French model Alizée Guinochet, have a daughter born on January 27, 2011. Blaine holds French citizenship since 2017. He dated Fiona Apple. He also had relationships with Madonna, Bijou Phillips, Josie Maran, Daryl Hannah and Lonneke Engel.

He was a member of an informal group of male celebrities – most associated with Leonardo DiCaprio – dubbed the "Pussy Posse".

Blaine's relationship with Jeffrey Epstein was reported in February 2026, revealing emails and information that the two met regularly for dinner between 2012 and 2016. In May 2015, Epstein asked Blaine to provide a letter of support for a U.S. visa application for a woman whose name is redacted, to which Blaine agreed. In an email inviting Blaine to meet in 2013, Epstein asked whether Blaine's "French girl" was in town; in a 2014 email, Epstein suggested Blaine could find him a new assistant while the latter was on tour in South Africa.

== Investigations into reports of sexual misconduct ==
An October 2017 report published in The Daily Beast in the wake of the Me Too movement resulted in renewed scrutiny of alleged misconduct. Subsequently, British news outlets reported that London's Metropolitan Police had asked Blaine to travel to the UK for interview under caution regarding allegations by former model Natasha Prince that Blaine had raped her at a house in Chelsea, West London in 2004. Speaking through his lawyer, Blaine "vehemently denies" the allegations and confirmed that he would "fully co-operate" with a police inquiry. Detectives later declined to take further action after investigating her claim.

In April 2019, Blaine was investigated by the New York City Police Department over allegations that he sexually assaulted at least two women. No charges were made.

== See also ==
- Escapology – Practice of escaping from restraints
- Hunger artist – Performers who starved themselves for paying audiences
- Super Best Friends
- List of Afro-Latinos
- List of people named in the Epstein files
