= Tesserae (video game) =

1990 video game

- Developer: Nicholas Schlott
- Publishers: Inline Design; GameTek (PC)
- Platforms: Game Boy, Game Gear, Macintosh, Windows
- Release: 1990, 1993
- Genre: Puzzle
- Mode: Single-player

Tesserae is a single-player video game developed by Nicholas Schlott based on Kent Brewster's DOS game Stained Glass and published by Inline Design in 1990 for the Macintosh. The game was also released for the Game Boy and Game Gear handhelds published by GameTek, developed by Eurocom.

== Gameplay ==
Tesserae is played by flipping colored tiles over other tiles to remove them from the board. While flipping over tiles subtracts the color from the tile that was jumped, landing on a tile adds the colors, making it more difficult for that tile to be removed. Primary tiles of red, blue and yellow combine to produce secondary tiles of purple, green and orange. A gray tile is produced by combining all three primary tiles. Game play starts simple with only primary tiles on a rectangular board. More complex board shapes as well as introducing secondary tiles increases the difficulty.

== New releases ==
In 2009, Aki's Playware acquired the rights to Tesserae and revived the game on the iPhone platform. In 2010, Aki's Playware released a more complete and accurate revival, Tesserae HD for the iPad. The program, however, is no longer in the iTunes store. Kudit had previously developed the first iPhone clone Mosaic on October 11, 2007 as had Pixlers developed the iPhone clone WORP, on June 7, 2009.

In 2011, coinciding with the opening of Apple's Mac App Store, Aki's Playware released Tesserae 20th Anniversary Edition for the Mac. This new release revives Tesserae on its original platform with modern graphics and new features, including a dynamic tournament scoreboard on the main window. Players can replay mosaics to improve their tournament scores and trophies.

In 2014, Tarkus Game Software revived the game on the Android platform. The game has a new modern design, was optimized for smartphones and tablets and completely free.

== Reception ==
Computer Gaming World stated that Tesserae "is a fine game ... and should be considered by any Macintosh owner. It provides many hours of challenge with a simple but elegant design that is sure to please anyone who enjoys using his or her head."

Macworld inducted Tesserae into its 1991 Macintosh Game Hall of Fame in the "Best Brain Game" category, ahead of runner-up 3 in Three.
