= Arrest of a Stone Buddha =

2020 video game

- Developer: Yeo
- Publisher: Yeo
- Platforms: Windows; Switch; Xbox One; Xbox Series X
- Release: February 27, 2020 (Win); May 21, 2020 (Switch); May 14, 2021 (Xbox)
- Genre: Shooter
- Mode: Single-player

Arrest of a Stone Buddha is a shooter video game developed by Yeo for Windows on February 27, 2020. A Nintendo Switch and Xbox ports were released later.

The game forms a series called Existential Duology with the previous game The Friends of Ringo Ishikawa (2018). Another similar game by the same developer, Fading Afternoon, was released in 2023.

== Gameplay ==
Arrest of a Stone Buddha is a side-scrolling shooter game set in Paris, France in 1976, in which the player character is a contract killer. Every mission starts with the killing of the target and then most of the mission is the player escaping to the getaway vehicle while shooting henchmen. There are no ammo drops; the player can take enemy weapons by using a melee move on them. Between missions, there's story scenes and the player can roam around the city and do various mundane activities. The game is influenced by French New Wave cinema and John Woo's action movies.

== Reception ==
Reception

Review scores
Publication	Score
TouchArcade	3.5/5
Digitally Downloaded	4.5/5
Nintendo World Report	6.5/10
Vandal	7/10

TouchArcade called it a "one-of-a-kind experience" and a game that appeals only to a niche audience. Famitsu said the detailed animations are the highlight of the game. Digitally Downloaded wrote: "[...] from an art criticism point of view, examining the effectiveness of the ultimate emotional impact, Arrest of a Stone Buddha is a triumph." Nintendo World Report compared the game to The Friends of Ringo Ishikawa: "this is a much more dour and less varied title than its predecessor".
