= A Fork in the Tale =

1997 video game

- Developer: AnyRiver Entertainment
- Publisher: Electronic Arts
- Designer: Rob Lay
- Platform: Windows
- Release: NA: February 26, 1997
- Genre: Adventure
- Mode: Single-player

A Fork in the Tale is a full motion video (FMV) comedic adventure game developed by AnyRiver Entertainment and published by Electronic Arts on February 26, 1997. The game features voice-overs by comedian Rob Schneider. Because of the large number of video sequences, the game was originally released on five CDs.

== Plot and gameplay ==
The protagonist (voiced by Schneider) finds himself transported to the land of Eseveron. Playing from a first-person perspective, the player must click on icons overlaid atop video clips with specific timing to proceed, all in an effort to figure out what is happening and how to escape. Failing to choose an action before the end of a clip is considered a choice of inaction. Schneider's voice-over work was added late in development to replace earlier placeholder voice work.

== Development ==
The game was in development for three and a half years with a budget of $2 million. It would be the only game released by AnyRiver Entertainment, with its low sales leading to the shuttering of the company within months of release, its assets being sold to Total Entertainment Network. The rights for a later DVD release with higher-quality video were acquired by Digital Leisure, but never came to fruition. The game was scheduled to be released in May 1997.

== Reception ==
Reception

Review scores
Publication	Score
Computer Gaming World	1.5/5
GameRevolution	3.5/5
GameSpot	3.7/10
Next Generation	1/5
PC PowerPlay	58%
PC Gamer	34%

PC Gamer US called A Fork in the Tale "a dismal flop, uniformly panned by critics and avoided by gamers, who bought less than 1,000 copies."

A Next Generation critic complained about the small amount of interactivity and said Rob Schneider's vocal delivery was mediocre. Charles Ardai of Computer Gaming World also criticized the limited interactivity and Schneider's performance, but focused most of his commentary on the repetitiveness of the video clips. He summarized, "At its best, it's reasonably funny; at its worst, the comedy is abysmal. But since the gameplay involves going through the same FMV scenes over and over and over, even the best comedy in the world couldn't stave off a creeping sense that you have been damned to some sort of Sisyphean penance." Game Revolution thought the game was short and easy, yet fun. In contrast, Rebecca Anderson of GameSpot considered the plot interesting but the gameplay frustratingly difficult, saying that the game demands the player to make decisions on a split-second's notice, and sends the player back too far after failures.
