= Fantasy Masters =

2002 video game

- Developer: Zeonix
- Platform: Windows
- Release: 2002 April -South Korea, 2007 November -International
- Genres: Fantasy, NTCG(Network Trading Card Game)
- Modes: Single-player, multiplayer

Fantasy Masters (Korean: 판타지 마스터즈; RR: Pantaji Maseuteojeu) was South Korea's first online trading card game, developed by Zeonix. It was released in April 2002 in South Korea and China.

The English version of the game, Fantasy Masters International, was released on November 27, 2007. The international version can be played in any country worldwide, excluding Korea and China.

A sequel, Fantasy Masters 2, was released in 2016. Both games were shut down in 2017 after Zeonix ceased operation without notice.

== History ==
Early Open Beta test of Fantasy Masters began in April 2002. As the first online trading card games in Korea, popularity has quickly taken its toll by enthusiasts. It was officially released in January 2003 as semi-free NTCG game.

== Game play ==
Fantasy Masters cards of various types and colors. From left to right, top to bottom, Land, Unit, Item, and Spell cards are shown here. © Zeonix, Inc. Images used with permission.

Games are played either one vs one or two vs two. When both players are ready, the game starts. The game screen is divided in three sections: battle area in which the battle takes place, info area where a player can check the opponent's status and yours, and the chat area.

Players take their turns (or phases) to summon their cards in order to prepare for Battle Phase. In order to summon any cards, players must have enough souls to summon, which can be acquired mainly by Land cards on player's backfield. Most Land cards do not require souls to play them. All Spells and Units on the front field engage in combat in the Battle Phase, and remaining cards come back to the preparation phase, and repeat until one of them wins the game.

The first player to deplete the opponent's Life or Deck by 0 wins the game. If both players' Life or Deck have reached 0 at the same time, offending player takes the win.

Playing the game is entirely free.

=== Coins ===
One unique aspects of the game is the coin system. For every battle between units, each player flips up to 5 coins. Depending on how many heads are flipped, a unit's stats (AP/DP/HP) change accordingly, creating drastic changes in battle outcomes.

=== Constructing Deck ===
A deck is made up of 50 cards, with at least one Land card included. It is the core part of the game, and at least one complete deck is required to play the game. A free starter deck is given to all players when their account is first made. Decks can be edited within the server.

There are four types of card in Fantasy Masters: Land, Unit, Item, and Spell. Generally, Lands generate souls, Units attack other player's Units or Life/Deck, Items reinforce Units' power, and Spells do various effect to win the battle.

- Land: The Land card is the main source of energy. A player can summon unit, item and spell cards using the souls produced by land cards. You can put up to 10 land cards on the land field.
- Unit: Unit card is called on the front field and confronts the enemies. It attacks enemy deck directly if there is no enemy unit on the field. On April 16, 2008, a new update from Korean FM has introduced Race and Affiliation system to further distinguish thousands of unit.
- Item: Item cards can be put on units on the front field.
- Spell: Spell cards are summoned on the front field. A spell card is put upside down on the field so the opponent won't know what it is. The card is flipped when the battle starts. The spell of lower level acts first. If the spells of both sides are of the same level, the attacker's spell hits first.

=== Collecting cards ===
Collecting cards is one of main elements of Fantasy Masters. There are 8 regular ways to collect cards in the Korean version, and many limitations are imposed on players in order to maintain economies of the game. Occasionally players can get free cards from the event held by Zeonix. Ordinarily, cards can be collected from Card Market, Booster Market, Trade, Album, Upgrade, Card Mix, Deck Market, and Auction.

Rarity of cards are set by 12 grades. From least to the most, they are: Free, Common, Uncommon, Rare, and Legend, while rarity of Basic, Trade, Upgrade, Unique, Special, Prize, and Event grades varies with individual cards.

Currently the Korean version has published over 6,700 cards, while English version quickly catching up with over 1,300 published cards.

=== Elements ===
Fantasy Masters consists of seven different elements: Dark, Fire, Water, Green, Metal, Earth, and Light. Event and Legend cards are considered as Light.

- Dark: They use their own blood to amplify the damage they give to the enemy. Zombies, Skeletons, Ghosts, Spirits, Deaths, Cursed, and Vampires are the recurring theme of Dark. Most Dark units have negative coins on their HP that is offset by stronger AP or higher HP than other characteristics. Many Dark spells can affect both players' units with favors on Dark side when used at the right moment. A lot of Dark spells associate with Graveyard. They are the color of black.
- Fire: The most aggressive army but relatively weak in defense. Demons, Devils, Evildoers, Goblins, Blood, Hell, and Fanatics are the recurring theme of Fire. Most Fire units have negative coins on their DP that is offset by the strongest AP in all characteristics. Fire spells generally do either amplifying friendly units' AP, or direct damage to opponent's units. They are the color of red.
- Water: Defense oriented army which is still dreadful with its illusion, confusion, maneuvering skills. Ice, Sea Monsters, Mermaids, Lizard men, Penguins, and Pirates are the recurring theme of Water. Water units generally have higher DP than others while have much weaker AP. Water spells consists of manipulating and weakening opponent's units into demise. They are the color of blue.
- Green: They get stronger and fearless when they pack. Elves, Fairies, Druids, Wolves, Treants, Frogs, and Insects are the recurring theme of Green. Many green units and spells heavily favor Beastly type units while Magical and Armed units support them. They are the color of green.
- Metal: They represent human empire always ready to conquer, with the help of their advanced weapons and chariots. Humans, Iron, Soldiers, and altered beasts are the recurring theme of Metal. They are the only faction to have high level items that can ridiculously strengthen even the weakest units. Metal spells heavily favor Armed units and Item-equipped units. They are the color of silver.
- Earth: The rugged fighters of this army are generally strong. Their strength is reinforced by spells and items. Sand, Giants, Dwarfs, Ettins, Desert, and Stones are the recurring theme of Earth. Earth units are well balanced that greatly depend on coins. Many Earth spells associate with Time. They are the color brown.
- Light: Heavenly beings gathered up for earthly combat. They can bless and protect their own units. Gods, Bless, Thunders, Unicorns, Saints, Punishment, Justice, and Angels are the recurring theme of Light. Light spells are volatile and generally favors friendly units and punishes opponents. They are the color white.

== Community Support ==
Fantasy Masters' community has been very active, due to the website being the source of card market. Korean FM currently supports Guild, League, and Ranking services. The website also supports Wizard board and FM Cartoon. Many cards are based on players' ideas from Wizard board, where selected user name is embedded in the card.

=== League ===
After numerous demonstration leagues which began in December 2003, the regular monthly leagues and the semiannual tournament championship matches consisting of monthly league winners began in May 2004, in Korean FM. League winners are awarded with the prize grade card that can be sold to market at huge sum of GP. Championship winners are awarded with physical prizes. Electronic Sports League for International version has officially begun in September 2008.
