= Forbes Corporate Warrior =

1997 video game

- Developer(s): Brooklyn Multimedia
- Publisher(s): Byron Preiss Multimedia
- Release: August 15, 1997
- Genre(s): First-person shooter
- Mode(s): Single player Multiplayer

Forbes Corporate Warrior is a 3D first-person shooter thinly guised as an investment game. The game was released in August 1997 by Byron Preiss Multimedia and developed by Brooklyn for Windows 95. The game is a shoot-em-up title in which players use business strategies to defeat opponents.

== Reviews ==
Reception

Review scores
Publication	Score
PC Gamer (Poland)	8%
The Times	3/10

Forbes Corporate Warrior received negative reviews upon release. Richard Longhurst of the Polish edition of PC Gamer wrote "the idea might not be so stupid if it were implemented sensibly", but faulted its "empty" spaces, "poor" graphics and design, and lack of humour. The Times described the game as a "turkey" and an "impossible marriage of two gaming styles", citing its "shaky first-person perspective". In a retrospective review for PC Gamer, Richard Cobbett described the game as "one of the worst shooters ever made", expressing confusion and incredulity at the game's concept and use of economic metaphors.
