= Grey Alien Games =

English video game developer

- Industry: Video games
- Founded: 2004
- Founder: Jake Birkett
- Headquarters: Bridport, Dorset, UK
- Website: https://greyaliengames.com/

Grey Alien Games is an indie English video game developer based in Dorset. It is jointly owned by wife and husband duo, Helen Carmichael and Jake Birkett.

They specialize in role-playing video games and solitaire video games.

The company's 2020 title Ancient Enemy, created in collaboration with Jim Rossignol and supported by Bithell Games, received an Honourable Mention for game design at the 2021 Independent Games Festival.

In 2021, Grey Alien Games collaborated with Dejobaan Games on T-Minus 30, a fast-paced city builder for PC. It also launched historical casual card title Regency Solitaire on the Nintendo Switch. Helen Carmichael also collaborated on narrative for Foxy Voxel for its early access game, Going Medieval.

As of 2025, the company was working with Night Signal Entertainment on Forbidden Solitaire, a horror solitaire game. A demo was released on January 16, 2026 and the full game was released on April 30, 2026.

== Games developed ==
Year	Title	Platform(s)
2005	Xmas Bonus	Microsoft Windows
2006	Easter Bonus	Microsoft Windows
2005	Holiday Bonus	Microsoft Windows, Macintosh, iPad, iPhone
2006	The Wonderful Wizard of Oz	Microsoft Windows, Macintosh, iPad, iPhone
2007	Fairway Solitaire	Microsoft Windows, Macintosh
2009	Unwell Mel	Microsoft Windows, Macintosh
2011	Spring Bonus	Microsoft Windows, Macintosh, iPad, iPhone
2012	Holiday Bonus Gold	Microsoft Windows, Macintosh, iPad, iPhone
2013	Spooky Bonus	Microsoft Windows, Macintosh
2015	Regency Solitaire	Microsoft Windows, Macintosh
2017	Shadowhand	Microsoft Windows, Macintosh
2020	Ancient Enemy	Microsoft Windows, Macintosh
2021	T-Minus 30	Microsoft Windows
2021	Regency Solitaire	Microsoft Windows, Macintosh, Nintendo Switch
2024	Regency Solitaire II	Microsoft Windows
2024	Shadowhand Solitaire	Microsoft Windows
2026	Forbidden Solitaire	Microsoft Windows
