= Flock! =

2009 video game

FLOCK!
- Developer(s): Proper Games
- Publisher(s): Capcom
- Platform(s): Cloud (OnLive); Windows; PlayStation 3 (PSN); Xbox 360 (XBLA)
- Release: Windows; April 7, 2009; Xbox 360; April 8, 2009; PlayStation 3 April 9, 2009
- Genre(s): Puzzle
- Mode(s): Single-player, multiplayer

Flock! (stylized as FLOCK!) is a puzzle video game developed by Proper Games and published by Capcom for Windows, PlayStation Network and Xbox Live Arcade. It was released in April 2009 for Microsoft Windows through Steam and Stardock's digital distribution service Impulse, Xbox Live Arcade and PlayStation Network. The game was additionally developed by A.C.R.O.N.Y.M. Games.

Flock! was delisted from Steam in May 2024.

Flock! is included in Capcom Digital Collection.

== Gameplay ==
The player controls a UFO ("The Flocker") and is tasked with herding farm animals (sheep, cows, chickens, and pigs) back to the mothership, "The Mother Flocker". This is challenging due to the hazardous environments the animals exist in – the players must defend their flock against hungry predators, avoid pits of death, and send their animals flying with catapults. There are 55 single-player levels that span across three seasons: summer, autumn, and winter. There is also a cooperative play mode.

== Extensibility ==
The game provided access to the same map editor the developers used to make the official levels, so players could make their own puzzles. Players could share maps with others via a persistent map server. PC and PS3 users could share maps between the two platforms.

== Reception ==
Reception

Aggregate score
Aggregator	Score		
Aggregator	PC	PS3	Xbox 360
Metacritic	65/100	71/100	68/100

Review scores
Publication	Score		
Publication	PC	PS3	Xbox 360
Edge	N/A	N/A	6/10
Eurogamer	N/A	N/A	5/10
GamePro	N/A	N/A	3.25/5
GameRevolution	N/A	N/A	C+
GameSpot	7/10	7/10	7/10
IGN	6.9/10	6.9/10	6.9/10
PlayStation Official Magazine – UK	N/A	6/10	N/A
Official Xbox Magazine (US)	N/A	N/A	8/10
PC Gamer (UK)	43%	N/A	N/A
VideoGamer.com	6/10	6/10	6/10
411Mania	N/A	N/A	7.5/10
The A.V. Club	A	N/A	N/A

The game received "mixed or average reviews" on all platforms according to the review aggregation website Metacritic.
