= Fist of Awesome =

2013 video game

- Developer(s): I Fight Bears
- Platform(s): iOS, Android, Ouya, GameStick, Windows, OS X
- Release: iOS, Android, Ouya; October 15, 2013; GameStick, Windows, OS X Winter 2013
- Genre(s): Beat 'em up
- Mode(s): Single-player

Fist of Awesome is an independently developed video game by Nicoll Hunt funded through Kickstarter, and is described by the developer as a time-travelling-lumberjack-em-up. Hunt was one of ten indie game developers chosen via Twitter to receive Ouya consoles for development. Fist of Awesome is one of the ten pre-selected indie games to be made potentially available for the Ouya.

== Gameplay ==
The hero, Tim Burr, is a forest dwelling tree person who gets caught up in an interstellar plot to enslave Earth by populating history with homicidal wild animals. The game takes place over a number of time periods and lets you punch a full grown grizzly bear in the face. It is a modern homage to games like Streets of Rage and Final Fight.

=== Mechanics ===
Fist of Awesome is a touch-screen beat 'em up aiming "to take seriously the challenge of creating fluid and intuitive controls without falling on the crutch of virtual buttons".

== Development ==
The developer has worked for many big games companies over the years including Codemasters, Visual Science and Realtime Worlds. He has contributed code and design to titles such as Colin McRae Rally 3, Colin McRae Rally 04 and APB.

== Reception ==
After its second week of release on Ouya, it was the second highest ranked game. In May 2014 the developer announced that this title had been greenlit on Steam after just seven days.
