= Fading Afternoon =

2023 video game

- Developer: Yeo
- Publishers: Yeo, Indie Ark
- Engine: GameMaker
- Platforms: Windows, Switch
- Release: September 15, 2023 (Win); June 6, 2024 (Switch)
- Genre: Beat 'em up
- Mode: Single-player

Fading Afternoon is a beat 'em up developed by Yeo for Windows released on September 15, 2023. A Nintendo Switch version was released on June 6, 2024.

It is the third game by Yeo after The Friends of Ringo Ishikawa (2018) and Arrest of a Stone Buddha (2020), which used similar themes and aesthetics.

== Gameplay ==
Fading Afternoon is a scrolling beat 'em up that takes place in Osaka, Japan, where the player assumes the role of Seiji Maruyama, a yakuza member who has just been released from prison. Maruyama has a terminal illness that reduces the player's maximum health constantly and serves as a time limit to the game. The player has to decide how to spend Maruyama's remaining time between fighting thugs to take over gang territory and various life sim-type activities.

== Release ==
The game was announced in July 2021 for a 2022 release. In September 2021, the game announced for release in September 2022 for the PC and Switch. The PC version was eventually released on September 15, 2023, and the Switch version on June 6, 2024. Shortly after release of the Switch version, the game was removed from the Japanese Nintendo eShop. As a result, the casino minigames were announced to be removed from the Switch version worldwide.

== Reception ==
Reception

Review scores
Publication	Score
Digitally Downloaded	4.5/5
Nintendo World Report	8.5/10
RPGFan	85/100
Siliconera	6/10

Digitally Downloaded wrote that "Fading Afternoon isn't an "entertaining" game in the traditional sense, but it's a powerful one that will leave you reflective and pensive by the time you put it down." Nintendo World Report praised the combat and life sim elements but criticized the user interface. RPGFan noted the game as Yeo's most intricate and compelling work yet. Famitsu called the game "an excellent human drama" and the gameplay an improvement over The Friends of Ringo Ishikawa. Siliconera said that some design decisions get in the way of a beautiful and meaningful game. Vandal called it "one of the best, but most underrated games of the year".
