= The Friends of Ringo Ishikawa =

2018 video game

- Steam header
- Designer: Yeo
- Engine: GameMaker Studio
- Platforms: Windows, macOS, Nintendo Switch, Xbox One
- Release: May 17, 2018 (Win); October 17, 2018 (Mac); April 4, 2019 (Switch); April 14, 2021 (Xbox One)
- Genre: Beat 'em up
- Mode: Single-player

The Friends of Ringo Ishikawa is a 2D side-scrolling beat 'em up developed by Yeo. It was released for Windows on May 17, 2018, ports for macOS, Nintendo Switch, and Xbox One followed later. The game forms a series called Existential Dilogy with the follow-up game Arrest of a Stone Buddha (2020). Another similar game by the same developer, Fading Afternoon, was released in 2023.

== Plot ==
The game takes place in a small-town in Japan. The player takes the role of a high school delinquent.

== Gameplay ==
The Friends of Ringo Ishikawa is a story driven beat 'em up using 16-bit-style pixel art. The game has a freeform structure where the player can decide what to do between story sequences. These include going to school and studying, reading at the library, working out at the gym, or beating rival gang members for cash. The game's combat system draws influence from Konami's Kensei: Sacred Fist and Rockstar's Bully.

== Development ==
The Friends of Ringo Ishikawa was developed by one person from Moscow, Russia named Vadim Gilyazetdinov, better known by his handle Yeo. All backgrounds in the game were made by Artem "Wedmak2" Belov and animations were made by Yeo's father who learned pixel art in his 60s especially for this occasion. The game started as a prototype developed for a local game jam in summer 2014. The title is a reference to the 1973 film The Friends of Eddie Coyle.

== Release ==
The game was announced for PC release on April 18, 2018. The Switch release was announced on October 10, 2018.

== Reception ==
Reception

Aggregate score
Aggregator	Score
Metacritic	64/100

Review scores
Publication	Score
Destructoid	5/10
IGN	7.5/10
Nintendo Life	6/10
Digitally Downloaded	4.5/5

The Friends of Ringo Ishikawa received "mixed or average" reviews according to review aggregator Metacritic.

Kohei Fujita of IGN Japan said that "The game's systems aren't well explained, which will catch many gamers off-guard at first, but its climax has a lasting impact that is worth experiencing."

Dom Reseigh-Lincoln of Nintendo Life summarized: "[...] What looks like a traditional side-scrolling brawler is actually something far more intricate. It's more of a teenage simulator than anything, and with some really well-written dialogue [...] there's a really interesting story to be found."

Matt S. of Digitally Downloaded called the it "the most surprisingly thoughtful game I have played in quite some time".

Time Extension included the game on their top 25 "Best Beat 'Em Ups of All Time" list.
