= The Fool and His Money =

2012 video game

- Developer: Cliff Johnson
- Platforms: Mac OS X, Windows
- Release: October 25, 2012
- Genre: Puzzle

The Fool and His Money is a puzzle video game by Cliff Johnson. It is a self-published sequel to the 1987 game The Fool's Errand. Like its predecessor, The Fool and His Money contains many different types of logic and word puzzles which, although centered on a story with a medieval tarot deck theme, have added elements of the Prince, Egyptian gods, and Pirates.

== Release information ==
Originally expected in late 2003, the game experienced dozens of postponements. On February 4, 2009, Johnson released a functioning preview of the game, containing the Prologue and five puzzles.

The game was released on October 25, 2012, one day earlier than finally promised, having taken ten years to produce. It is written using Adobe Director with embedded Flash.

As of 2025, the website is no longer available, and Cliff Johnson has been reported as describing the game as "no longer operational"

== Reception and awards ==
In his review for Just Adventure, Greg Collins awarded The Fool and His Money an A plus.

Andrew Plotkin considered The Fool and His Money an improvement on The Fool's Errand, with better puzzle sequencing, a more harmonious variety of puzzle forms, and a smooth increase in complexity as the game progresses. Plotkin recommended the game "if you like puzzles, if you like challenges, if you like working all-out on crazy-hard puzzles where they barely even tell you the rules."

Jay Is Games rated it best indie puzzle game of 2012.
