= Ford F-150 Lightning (disambiguation) =

The Ford F-150 Lightning is a battery electric pickup truck announced by Ford in 2021.

Ford F-150 Lightning may also refer to:

- Ford SVT Lightning, a sports/performance version of the F-150 on the 9th generation F-series platform
- Ford SVT Lightning, a sports/performance version of the F-150 on the 10th generation F-series platform
