= FastCrawl =

2006 video game

- Developer: Glen Pawley
- Publisher: Pawleyscape
- Platform: Windows
- Release: October 12, 2006
- Genre: Role-playing
- Mode: Single-player

FastCrawl is a fast-paced role-playing video game of the dungeon crawl sub-variety. The title was created by British developer Glen Pawley and released for Microsoft Windows on October 12, 2006. Distributed via direct download, a free trial version can be played for one hour, or the full version can be purchased online.

== Gameplay ==
Intending to appeal to those who enjoy role-playing games but cannot devote the large number of hours typically required to complete them, FastCrawl aims to provide a complete game experience in around 30 minutes. Players can also opt for slightly longer games, and can play more slowly at their leisure, since the title is entirely turn-based. Dungeon layouts and virtually every other aspect of the game are randomly generated (cf. Rogue).

When the game begins, players are given a brief mission statement instructing them to lead their party into the depths of the dungeon in order to find and exterminate a certain foe. Players begin with a randomly generated party, complete with names, character portraits, and starting equipment. Parties range from three to five individuals, and consist of a random selection of clerics, mages, rogues, and warriors. While players are guaranteed to not receive more than two of any given character class, there are no guarantees that the party will be balanced.

While exploring the dungeon, players are provided with a simple iconic map representing the party's location and the location of nearby items of interest, including doors, rooms, hallways, enemies, and treasure. Players move from one location to another by clicking with the mouse (and in fact, the game is played entirely with the mouse). Each action consumes a single unit of supplies (representing food and water) which can only be replenished by discovering new supply packs in treasure troves. Resting also consumes a number of supplies, and running out of supplies is fatal, so players must only rest when absolutely necessary.

When entering a location inhabited by monsters or other enemies, combat is initiated. At the start of each battle, players position their characters in either the front or rear rows, depending on equipment and function. The title uses an initiative system, allowing each character or enemy to act in order relative to their speed. Characters are limited to two actions, performed with either the left or right mouse button on the highlighted target. Hence, a cleric would ordinarily be able to attack a foe by clicking it with the left mouse button, or heal a fellow party member by right-clicking his or her portrait. While winning battles doesn't earn any experience, players can receive items for emerging victorious.

After the goals of a given level are satisfied (which always includes locating the staircase leading down, and may include other objectives), players venture deeper into the dungeon. When going down a level, all characters in the party automatically go up in level and each may choose an enhancement or specialization. Additionally, any characters who were dead are restored to life. Players can not return to previous levels, and the difficulty of foes increases with each level. On the final level (usually the third or fourth), the game can be successfully completed by defeating the final villain or "boss" enemy.

=== Scoring ===
Since FastCrawl is designed to be replayed over and over again, the game features a relatively elaborate scoring system so that players can compare each game to previous efforts. Separate scoreboards are used for short, medium, and long duration games, but all difficulty levels share the same scoreboard. As successfully completing the game at a higher difficulty level almost always yields a higher score, players are encouraged to defeat the game on the harder difficulty levels (although successfully doing this can rely heavily on luck).

Factors involved in score calculation include:

- Difficulty level and number of dungeon levels traversed.
- Percentage of completion, in terms of monsters slain, secrets found, and rooms explored.
- A bonus awarded for playing with an "unbalanced" party.

== Reception ==
The reviewer at "Game Tunnel" enjoyed the premise of the game, allowing one to play simple short adventures (with limited depth) in measured doses. He felt the replayability was quite high, commenting "I've yet to tire of FastCrawl and have been playing at least one adventure for each day of the week." However, the review also noted that, due to the title's inherent randomness, a certain measure of frustration is sometimes unavoidable, remarking "It's also entirely possible to spend an hour playing through an adventure and get to the last encounter and find its [sic] something your party simply cannot win." Overall, the game earned a middle-of-the-road "try" recommendation.

A review at "Just RPG" noted that the game wasn't "hardcore" enough for some, but that its strengths were also its weaknesses, concluding "If you're looking for a casual RPG to spend some time with, then look no further." This casual appeal, along with the title's replayability, earned it a final grade of 76%.
