= Cliff Johnson (game designer) =

American game designer

- Born: August 14, 1953; Hanover, New Hampshire, U.S.
- Occupation: Game designer
- Years active: 1984–
- Notable work: The Fool's Errand, 3 in Three

Cliff Johnson (born 1953) is an American game designer, best known for the puzzle video games The Fool's Errand (1987) and 3 in Three (1990). Both games use visual puzzles and a metapuzzle structure. Both won GAMES Magazine's Best Puzzle Game of the Year.

== Biography ==
Johnson was born August 14, 1953, in Hanover, New Hampshire, the only child of Norman and Leatrice Johnson. He attended Bristol Eastern High School in Connecticut, where he started making Super 8 movies. In 1972, he had jobs "building monsters" for five different amusement parks. He later attended University of Southern California's film school, where he became a teaching assistant in animation and created some of the Monty Pythonesque animations for Nickelodeon's television series Out of Control.

In 1984, using his first computer, a Macintosh 512K, he learned to program and created the game The Fool's Errand, which in 1987 won "Best Puzzle Game of the Year" from GAMES Magazine and was declared "Best Retro Game Ever" by British GamesTM magazine.)

From 1990 to 1995, he directed the *FunHouse* production group for Philips Media, and from 1996 to 2001, he consulted with Mattel, Warner Bros. and Disney for online puzzles and treasure hunts.

In 2002, Johnson designed a $100,000 Challenge for the book Mysterious Stranger by street magician David Blaine. It was solved in 2004.

== Authored games ==
- The Fool's Errand (1987) — GAMES Magazine's Best Puzzle Game of the Year (Macintosh & Dos)
- At the Carnival (1989) — Macworld Game Hall of Fame inductee, Brain Teaser category (Macintosh & DOS)
- Disney's Cartoon Arcade (1990) - View-Master Interactive Vision/Walt Disney Home Video(VHS)
- 3 in Three (1990) — MacUser's Best Game of the Year; GAMES Magazine's Best Puzzle Game of the Year (Macintosh)
- Hanna Barbera's Cartoon Carnival (1993) (CD-I)
- Merlin's Apprentice (1994) (CD-I)
- Labyrinth of Crete (1995) (CD-I)
- The Fool and His Money (2012)

== Other contributed works ==
- Game Design: Disney's The Hunt for the Lost Toy, website contest, 1996
- Game Design: Of Light and Darkness: The Prophecy, 1998
- Treasure Hunt Design: David Blaine's Mysterious Stranger book, 2002
