= Fate by Numbers =

2007 video game

- Developer: Revival
- Publisher: Revival
- Designer: Paul van der Meer
- Programmer: Rudi Nagelhout
- Platform: Windows
- Release: July 30, 2007
- Genre: Adventure
- Mode: Single-player

Fate by Numbers: An FMV Adventure Game is a free episodic full motion video adventure game developed by the independent Dutch development team Revival. Destructoid listed Fate by Numbers as the sixth best freeware adventure game of 2007.
