= Proper Games =

British video game developer

Proper Games Limited
- Company type: Private
- Industry: Video games
- Founded: 2006; 19 years ago
- Founder: Paddy Sinclair
- Defunct: 6 January 2020
- Fate: Insolvency
- Headquarters: Dundee, Scotland
- Key people: Paddy Sinclair (CEO)

Proper Games Limited was a British video game developer based in Dundee. Paddy Sinclair founded Proper Games in early 2006 after the closure of his previous employer, Visual Science. In March 2011, the company underwent restructuring, which included several layoffs, and several more employees left the company that September. Proper Games filed for insolvency in January 2020, which culminated in its liquidation in July 2021.

== Games developed ==
Year	Title	Platform(s)	Ref(s).
2009	Flock!	PlayStation 3, Windows, Xbox 360	
2010	Final Fight: Double Impact	PlayStation 3, Xbox 360	
2010	Toy Box (Crackdown 2 DLC)	Xbox 360	
2011	Moving Day	iOS	
2015 (early access)	Super Dungeon Run	Linux, macOS, Windows	
