= The Fool's Errand =

1987 video game

- Macintosh cover art
- Developer: Cliff Johnson
- Publisher: Miles Computing
- Platforms: Mac OS, MS-DOS, Amiga, Atari ST
- Release: 1987
- Genre: Puzzle
- Mode: Single-player

The Fool's Errand is a 1987 computer game by Cliff Johnson. It is a meta-puzzle game with storytelling, visual puzzles, and a cryptic treasure map. It is the tale of a wandering Fool who seeks his fortune in the Land of Tarot and braves the enchantments of the High Priestess. A sequel titled The Fool and His Money was released October 25, 2012.

== Plot ==
The plot focuses on The Fool card of the tarot, who is portrayed as a silhouette of a young man wearing a peaked, feathered cap, curled-toed shoes, and carrying a knapsack on a stick. The Fool is the protagonist of the story, and he encounters various other cards from the tarot. In the beginning of the story, The Sun gives him a map, which has been scrambled, and directs him to find the "Lost 14 Treasures of the World." The Fool journeys through four kingdoms (each representing a suit from the minor arcana of the tarot), where he encounters other characters, who either give him more information or provide him with additional tasks. The High Priestess card of the tarot is set up as the villain of the story, and all the characters he meets are other cards from the tarot. Each character is drawn as a black silhouette, as is the background art.

== Gameplay ==
The game is structured as a storybook divided into five parts, each containing a large number of different chapters; the storybook can be paged through and read as continuous prose on screen. However, not every chapter is available at the start of the game, and those chapters which are available are not consecutive. Many chapters have a puzzle (called an enchantment) associated with them; completing such a puzzle unlocks further chapter(s). Many of the chapters are named after a tarot card in either the Major Arcana or the Minor Arcana.

Frequently, the puzzles are designed in such a way that the result of the puzzle leads logically into the unlocked chapter; for example, the player may complete an acrostic puzzle which results in the phrase "No Ship", which then unlocks part of the story in which a watchman indeed reports that no ship has been sighted and deals with the consequences. Other puzzles feature pictures which portray parts of the story or even clues to other puzzles.

The Sun's Map in the Macintosh version

The first chapter, The Sun, features the puzzle The Sun's Map. This is a jigsaw puzzle with one piece for every chapter in the story; each puzzle piece appears only when the appropriate chapter is unlocked. Each piece contains a symbol representing the chapter from which it came, plus part of a continuous path which flows through all pieces in the order in which they are mentioned in the narrative. Once the map is successfully completed, other designs on the map become active click targets and can be used as clues or processes to decipher the true final puzzle: The Book Of Thoth, hidden within the chapter The High Priestess, which requires the reader to peruse the entire story as continuous prose and identify a number of phrases hidden within the narrative.

== Development ==
Cliff Johnson, who at that point had worked as a filmmaker, was inspired by films like Sleuth and The Last of Sheila which included puzzle-mysteries for the viewer to solve; he aimed to host "mystery" dinner parties where players would uncover clues to find the hidden secrets.

The 1979 work Masquerade by Kit Williams served as further inspiration. The final chapter of the picture book revealed that the protagonist bunny had lost his treasure, and dared the reader to uncover the clues throughout the book to work out where on Earth it is located; this book sold over 2 million copies and while Johnson was not personally enamoured by the work he felt the idea behind it was exciting.

Johnson decided to create a similar work which he would distribute to his friends as a 1984 Christmas present. The concept, a series of puzzles and a narrative that fit together into an overarching mystery like a jigsaw, was an early incarnation of what became The Fool's Errand. Having recently purchased his first personal computer, a Macintosh, Johnson began coding the game in 1985. He learned to program specifically to bring the idea to the interactive entertainment format. His goal was to “make the experience pleasant and solvable in a single afternoon.” His initial approach to programming was guided by his experience making animated film, which involved "a very tedious frame-by-frame process", creating a blueprint and putting the pieces together to assemble the whole picture in a manner similar to a jigsaw puzzle.

Johnson took out a $50,000 loan to finance the project himself, and he had a nervous breakdown during development. By 1986 he had created over 30 individual data-driven programs, which he then had to convert into one application on ZBasic.

== Release ==
The Fool's Errand was released in 1987 by Miles Publishing. The game saw slow sales initially, but, as positive reviews began to be published, more customers purchased the title. Electronic Arts took over the distribution, and it was ported to many other consoles. The game was also circulated illegally on file-sharing sites for many years.

Created with Microsoft BASIC and ZBasic for the Apple Macintosh, the game was ported to MS-DOS, Commodore Amiga and Atari ST. The ports add color, but in a lower resolution (320×200, as opposed to the original version's 512×342). In 2002 the game was released as shareware, available for download from Johnson's website Fools-errand.com. The game is now offered free of charge. Johnson advises PC-based players to download the Macintosh version and play using a Macintosh emulator. The non-Macintosh versions of the game were protected by a symbol-based code wheel. The free version currently offered by the author has this mechanism disabled: the challenge screen still appears, but any answer is accepted.

== Reception ==
The Fool's Errand did not sell well at first, but after a very positive July 1988 review in MacUser it became very successful, causing Miles Computing to port the game to other platforms. 100,000 copies were sold by the end of 1989. The MacUser review gave the game five out of five mice, saying it "goes beyond being 'just' an excellent game" and "ventures into the realm of myth, into the prototypical lands of the epic legend, into the maelstrom of the Jungian archetype, and it returns to our world and offers us a way to extend ourselves beyond the boundaries of our normal existence." In December 1989, MacUser named The Fool's Errand one of the 27 best games available for the Macintosh.

Macworld reviewed the game positively, calling it a difficult and epic collection of diverse puzzles that demanded "considerable interaction and ingenuity." The review praised the attractive and unique presentation of the puzzles and the beautiful graphics of the animated prologue and finale. In a review for Cliff Johnson's next game, At the Carnival, Macworld called The Fool's Errand "a new kind of computer game that transcends traditional categories."

Computer Gaming World praised the game, stating "You feel like you're matching wits with the author directly, instead of playing 'hunt the parser'"; the magazine's Scorpia described it as "one of the best games I've ever played". STart's reviewer confessed that he had come close to finishing The Fool's Errand but that "I felt like I'd run, and lost, a mental marathon".

The Games Machine awarded the PC version of The Fool's Errand its Golden Scroll and rated it 93%, calling it "fresh, original and addictive". Game Player's PC Strategy Guide reviewed the PC version positively, singling out the "great graphics", "consistent level of challenge", and above all the fact that the puzzles "play fair" with no obscurely hidden clues or tricks. .info magazine called the Amiga version of the game "a magnificent achievement in game design" but dropped the rating from five stars to three stars due to the poor quality of the port, with its unused right mouse button, "insufferable EGA" graphics and poor quality sounds. Amiga Format rated the game 70%, praising the "sheer number and variety of the puzzles" and calling it "an intelligent use of the machine" despite reservations about the graphics and sound quality.

=== Retrospective reviews ===
In 2004, Inside Mac Games selected The Fool's Errand as one of the 20 games that made the biggest impact on the Macintosh, calling the game "intriguing and visually-rich", with an "original and compelling" story that was "thick with mysticism, witchcraft, folklore, and hints on how to solve the game's final meta-puzzle". In 2007, Game Set Watch deemed it "one of the greatest puzzle games in personal-computing history". In a 2012 interview with Johnson, Wired crowned it "the greatest puzzle game of all time". In 2018, PC Gamer selected The Fool's Errand for its weekly best free PC games feature, saying the "whimsical fantasy" would challenge the player's brain.

GamesTM featured The Fool's Errand in its "Greatest Retro Game Ever" column, calling it "obscenely addictive" and "revered by nearly everyone" who played it. In a 2013 feature on the evolution of puzzle video games, Retro Gamer called The Fool's Errand an excellent strategy fantasy game with "a well-crafted narrative" that "arguably paved the way for games like the Professor Layton series, which now feature similar narrative puzzles to solve."

=== Awards ===
The Fool's Errand was inducted into the 1987 Macworld Game Hall of Fame as Best Brain-Teasing game. GAMES Magazine selected The Fool's Errand as one of the best computer games of 1988, saying "Some puzzles are easy, others tricky; all are charming and great fun to figure out."

VideoGames & Computer Entertainment named The Fool's Errand Best Computer Strategy Game of 1988, ahead of runners-up Prime Time, Rommel: Battles for North Africa, and Solitaire Royale. The magazine praised The Fool's Errand as "the most clever framework for an anthology of word games and puzzles ever devised."

The editors of Game Player's PC Strategy Guide presented the game with their 1990 "Best PC Puzzle Game" award. They wrote, "One of the best puzzle games ever produced — everything from mazes to cryptograms worked into an elaborate, witty narrative, and presented with exceptional graphic flair.
