= Furifuri =

2008 video game

- Developer: 130cm
- Publisher: Visual Art's
- Platform: Windows
- Release: JP: August 29, 2008
- Genres: Eroge, Visual novel
- Mode: Single-player

Furifuri: Futsū no Mainichi ni Warikonde Kita, Fushigi na Rinjin-tachi no Ohanashi Ohanashi (Japanese: ふりフリ ～ふつうのまいにちにわりこんできた、フシギなリンジンたちのおはなしおはなし～), commonly shortened to simply Furifuri, is a Japanese adult visual novel developed by 130cm released on August 29, 2008, for the PC as a DVD. Furifuri is described by the development team as an everyday interruption adventure game (日常割り込み系ＡＶＧ, Nichijiō Warikomi-kei AVG), and is the fifth title to be developed by 130cm, after their previous titles such as Princess Bride. The gameplay in Furifuri follows a linear plot line, which offers pre-determined scenarios and courses of interaction, and focuses on the appeal of the five female main characters.

== Gameplay ==
A conversation in Furifuri depicting the protagonist Haruaki talking to Zyun.

The gameplay in Furifuri requires little player interaction from the player, as most of the duration of the game is only spent on reading the text that appears on the screen, representing either dialogue between characters, or the inner thoughts of the protagonist. Every so often, the player will come to a "decision point", where he or she is given the chance to choose from multiple options. The time between these points is variable and can occur anywhere from a minute to much longer. Gameplay pauses at these points and depending on which choice the player makes, the plot will progress in a specific direction. There are five main plot lines that the player will have the chance to experience, one for each of the heroines in the story. To view all five plot lines, the player will have to replay the game multiple times and make different decisions to progress the plot in an alternate direction.

== Plot ==
=== Setting and themes ===
The main part of Furifuri's story takes place in a seaside town called Hoshifuri-dai (星降り台), known for its observations of waste (ガラクタ, Garakuta), mysterious objects that fall from the sky. Hoshifuri-dai is split into several regions. To the center of the town is Palace of Ostwind (オストヴィント宮殿, Osutovinto Kyūden), a mysterious building under investigation located on the top of a hill. Next to the palace is Stardust Shopping Mall (スターダスト商店街, Sutādasuto Shōtengai), and the town's largest shopping district, where the protagonist's house and the town's waterfront Syuronoki Street (シュロの木通り, Shuro no Ki-tōri) locates nearby. To the other side of the palace is the Myoujo Park (明星公園, Myōjō Kōen), a park built to commemorate the location of the earliest known waste fall. Close to the park is a school called Rokubungi Academy (六分儀学園, Rokubungi Gakuen), which the main characters attend. Other locations off-island includes the Odds and Ends Laboratory, which investigates the waste, the Nadeshiko Apartments (なでしこ荘, Nadeshiko-sō), and the Amano Beach (天の浜, Ama no Hama).

Skies and astronomy are recurring themes in Furifuri. The mysterious object, waste falls from the sky. The names of various locations in the game are attributed to astronomy, the town's shopping district shares its name with stardust, and the park is named after the planet Venus. The school is named after a sextant, and the beach's name refers to the sky's beach.

The heroines and two side characters of Furifuri (clockwise, from top-left): Mako and Kako, Merluza, Kaguya, Minori, Horobi, and Zyun.

=== Principal characters ===
The player assumes the role of Haruaki Aki (穐 春秋, Aki Haruaki), the protagonist of Furifuri. Haruaki is a fan of the mysterious object waste, and is the president of the waste club at school. He is skilled at housekeeping tasks, and believes that everyone can get along well if they have delicious food together. Minori Momose (桃瀬みのり, Momose Minori; Voiced by: Miu Aoi), the main heroine of Furifuri, is the follower to Horobi (ホロビ; Voiced by: Asuka Misono), the king of devils. Although loyal, Minori is rarely ever useful to Horobi due to her energetic and gluttony personality. Zyun Ōtori (鳳潤, Ōtori Jun; Voiced by: Usako Usada), another heroine, is the apprentice to the hero Merluza (メルルーサ, Merurūsa; Voiced by: Naoki Koshita). Though proud of this fact and works hard in becoming a hero, she wishes of a romantic interest of someone her age. She maintains a calm personality, and never hesitates before helping anyone. Mako von Ostwind and Kako von Ostwind (馬子＝フォン＝オストヴィント、鹿子＝フォン＝オストヴィント, Mako Fon Osutovinto, Kako Fon Osutovinto; Voiced by: Airi Himekawa), both heroines, are twins born to the royal family of a pirate country. Despite their selfish personalities, they care about others, though in a subtle way. Kaguya Tsukuyomi (月詠かぐや, Tsukuyomi Kaguya; Voiced by: Haruto Tsuruya), the fifth and last heroine, is a first year student from Haruaki's school. She is a model student, and is the only other waste club member other than Haruaki, joining due to her crush with Haruaki.

=== Story ===
The story of Furifuri revolves around the male protagonist Haruaki Aki, a young high school student who lives in the town of Hoshifuri. One day, on his way home from school, Haruaki observed the falling of a waste. Having always been a fan of the waste, and because of the rare chances to obtain waste even to locals, Haruaki heads straight to where the waste has landed. Upon his arrival, Haruaki discovers a small piece of light. As he reaches out for it, the light disappears, leaving only the piece of waste. As Haruaki slips it into his pocket and decides to go home, two lights suddenly blows from the sky, and along with the lights, two girls, Minori Momose and Zyun Ōtori lands on the ground. The two girls then engaged in battle while Haruaki watches by the side thinking they are shooting a film. Haruaki is then seriously injured, but is able to recover with the power of the waste he found earlier, absorbing Minori's master, Horobi in the process. With Horobi now residing in Haruaki's body, Minori decides to stay at Haruaki's house, with Zyun staying in town to monitor them.

== Development ==
Cover art of the original release of the visual novel.

Furifuri is the fifth title to be developed by 130 cm, after previous titles such as Princess Bride. Art direction is headed by Iko Izumi, who has also provided the character designs used in the game, and will be the artist's first work on a visual novel project. Planning for Furifuri is headed by Makoto Hyōtō, with the scenario being provided by Kansei Nishisora. Music used in the game is composed by U-ma. Both Makoto Hyōtō and U-ma has previously been in the development team of Kanojo-tachi no Ryūgi, 130 cm's previous game.

=== Release history ===
On July 25, 2008, a free game demo of Furifuri was released online. The full game was released on August 29, 2008, as a DVD playable only on a Microsoft Windows PC.

== Music ==
The visual novel has one theme song. The opening theme, entitled "Stars Biscuit" was performed and written by Kotoko, and composed and arranged by Maiko Iuchi. An original soundtrack disc containing the opening theme song was released on December 28, 2008, alongside a paperbag as part of 130 cm's Comiket 75 product set.

== Reception and sales ==
Furifuri was placed as the seventh most purchased game on solely Getchu.com throughout the month of August 2008, and was also the fifth most purchased game in Japan that month, according to a national ranking of PC games in Japan.
