= Ford Racing (video game) =

2000 video game

- PlayStation cover art featuring a Ford Taurus stock car
- Developers: Elite Systems (Windows); Toolbox Design (PlayStation)
- Publisher: Empire Interactive
- Producer: List: Windows: Steve Wilcox Nick Halstead Ashton Fletcher PlayStation: Danny Rawles Ben Tuszynski
- Programmer: List: Windows: Dave Taylor Adrian Jones Dave Cotterill Mark Williams PlayStation: Ashley Thwaites Peter Marshal
- Artists: Windows: Mike Snyder; PlayStation: Mike Baker
- Platforms: PlayStation, Windows
- Release: November 2, 2000: Windows: NA: November 2, 2000 PlayStation: NA: January 29, 2001 PlayStation Network: NA: May 21, 2009
- Genre: Racing
- Mode: Single player

Ford Racing is a racing video game published by Empire Interactive for Windows and the PlayStation video game console. The computer version was developed by Elite Systems and released on November 2, 2000, while the PlayStation version was developed by Toolbox Design and released on January 29, 2001.

It was the first game in the Ford Racing video game series, and received mixed reviews. Ford Racing was released as a downloadable PS one Classic game on the PlayStation Store in May 2009, allowing it to be played on the PlayStation 3 and PlayStation Portable.

== Gameplay ==
The PC version of Ford Racing features 12 different Ford vehicles and 10 race tracks, while the PlayStation version has 11 vehicles and eight tracks. None of the tracks are based on real locations. The player begins the game with a Ford Ka, while other vehicles are unlocked as the player progresses through the game. Two models exist for each vehicle for the years of 1997 to 2000, for a total of eight different versions of each vehicle.

In "Career Mode", the player must win races to receive prize money, which can then be used to upgrade vehicles. After each race, there is an optional action replay, which can be viewed from different camera angles. The PlayStation version includes a multiplayer option, which is absent in the PC version.

== Reception ==
Reception

Aggregate score
Aggregator	Score	
Aggregator	PC	PS
Metacritic	51/100	53/100

Review scores
Publication	Score	
Publication	PC	PS
AllGame	2.5/5	
GameSpot		4.9/10
GameZone	7/10	9.4/10
IGN		4.3/10
PC Zone	1.9/10	
Sports Gaming Network	48/100	

On Metacritic, the PlayStation version has a score of 53, while the PC version has a score of 51, both indicating "mixed or average reviews". Several reviewers criticized the game's poorly conceived AI-controlled drivers for ramming the player's vehicle off the road.

David Zdyrko of IGN reviewed the PlayStation version and criticized its graphics, and standard music and sound effects, as well as the track designs. Zdyrko noted that the vehicles resembled their real-life counterparts, but that they "don't even come close" to the vehicle designs offered in the Gran Turismo series. Shahed Ahmed of GameSpot reviewed the PlayStation version and criticized its graphics as well. Ahmed also complained that only "dull and slow-moving" vehicles are available at the beginning of the game, while faster vehicles and "cool tracks" need to be unlocked. Ahmed wrote: "Despite strong control mechanics and an advanced physics engine, the game has many flaws keeping it from being a truly appealing product". However, he wrote that fans of Ford vehicles "may find some novelty value in Ford Racing at its bargain price".

Laurie Emerson of GameZone praised every aspect of the PlayStation version and wrote that the game is "a winner on all counts!" GameZone's Rita Courtney praised the PC version for its gameplay and graphics, but wrote that additional instructions would have been helpful, stating that "they are just a bit scarce for those who aren't familiar with racing games. It also takes a 3-D accelerator card, which can be a problem for a lot of folks that have older systems. Other than that though, it's a lot of good racing action". Dave Woods of PC Zone criticized the game's controls, graphics, and lack of multiplayer, and concluded: "We were expecting a fairly good ride with Ford, but we've been cruelly disappointed".

Scott Moore of Sports Gaming Network praised the graphics and variety of vehicles, but criticized the lack of an in-car view while driving, calling it one of the game's "biggest drawbacks". Moore also criticized the music and sound effects, and complained that each vehicle handled in the same way. Moore concluded that Ford Racing "is a good idea gone wrong". Clayton Crooks of AllGame reviewed the PC version and wrote: "Unfortunately, the graphics may be the only strong point of the game, as the playability leaves a lot to be desired. Billed as a racing simulation rather than arcade racer, Ford Racing was supposed to be about realistic physics and car handling, but the game falters terribly in this respect". Crooks also considered the music to be repetitive and mundane.
