= Ford Racing (series) =

Video game series

- Genre: Racing
- Developer: List: Elite Systems Eutechnyx Gotham Games Razorworks Toolbox Design Visual Impact Productions
- Publisher: List: 2K Games Eidos Interactive Empire Interactive Feral Interactive Take-Two Interactive
- Platform: List: Arcade Game Boy Advance Mac OS X Nintendo DS Personal computer PlayStation PlayStation 2 PlayStation Portable Wii Xbox
- First release: Ford Racing; November 2, 2000 (PC); January 29, 2001 (PlayStation)
- Latest release: Off Road; March–September 2008 (various platforms)

Ford Racing is a racing video game series consisting of seven titles released for various platforms, including the PlayStation, PlayStation 2, Microsoft Windows (PC) and Xbox. The games in the Ford Racing series center around racing modern and vintage Ford cars and trucks through specifically designed tracks, while competing against computer-driven (and sometimes player-driven) opponents. The series began with the release of Ford Racing in 2000. The final game, titled Ford Racing Off Road, was released in 2008; the game featured the addition of vehicles from Land Rover, which was owned by Ford at the time. All titles in the series have received mixed reviews.

== Video games ==
=== Ford Racing (2000) ===
Ford Racing was released for the Windows in November 2000, followed by a PlayStation version released in January 2001. Elite Systems developed the Windows version, while Toolbox Design developed the PlayStation version. Both versions were published by Empire Interactive. The game features 12 Ford cars from both the United States and Europe lines and 9 tracks on which to race. The game features a career mode with several different types of races and the ability to upgrade the cars with various upgrades.

On Metacritic, the PlayStation version has a score of 53, while the Windows version has a score of 51, both indicating "mixed or average reviews".

=== Ford Racing 2 (2003) ===
Ford Racing 2 was released on October 28, 2003 for the PlayStation 2 (PS2), followed by releases for Windows and Xbox later that year. Gotham Games and Razorworks developed the game, which was published by Empire Interactive and Take-Two Interactive. It was released for the Mac OS X in October 2004 by Feral Interactive. The sequel includes 30 Ford cars, 16 racing tracks, the ability to race head-to-head, over 30 challenges and other features.

On Metacritic, the PS2 version has a score of 51, while the Xbox version has a score of 62, both indicating "mixed or average reviews".

=== Ford Racing 3 (2004) ===
Ford Racing 3 was released in Europe on October 29, 2004, followed by a U.S. release the following year. The game was released for Windows, PS2, Xbox, Game Boy Advance (GBA), and Nintendo DS. Visual Impact Productions developed the GBA and DS versions, while Razorworks developed the other versions. Empire Interactive and Global Star Software published the game, which includes 55 different types of Ford vehicles and 14 different tracks.

On Metacritic, the PS2 and Xbox versions have a score of 50 and 58 respectively, each indicating "mixed or average reviews", while the DS version has a score of 49, indicating "generally unfavorable reviews".

=== Ford Mustang: The Legend Lives (2005) ===
Ford Mustang: The Legend Lives, featuring only Ford Mustangs, was the next game in the series. It was developed by Eutechnyx and published by 2K Games, and released for the PS2 and Xbox in April 2005. The game features 40 Mustang vehicles dating to 1964. The game features three single-player game modes, and includes 22 race tracks set in seven U.S. cities.

On Metacritic, the PS2 version has a score of 58, while the Xbox version has a score of 55, both indicating "mixed or average reviews".

=== Ford Racing Full Blown (2006) ===
In 2006, Empire Interactive partnered with Sega Amusements Europe to develop an arcade game based on the series, titled Ford Racing Full Blown. The game was released in Europe in March 2006.

=== Ford Street Racing (2006) ===
Ford Street Racing, developed by Razorworks, was released in 2006, for Windows, PS2, PlayStation Portable (PSP), and Xbox. The PSP version was published by Eidos Interactive, while the other versions were published by Empire Interactive.

=== Ford Racing Off Road (2008) ===
Ford Racing Off Road, released outside of the U.S. as Off Road, is the final game in the series, released in 2008 for Windows, PS2, PSP and Wii. Off Road was developed by Razorworks and published by Empire Interactive. The game features 18 officially licensed Land Rover and Ford vehicles, 12 detailed tracks and 3 different off-road environments (Desert, Water and Ice).

According to Metacritic, the game received "generally unfavorable reviews".

== See also ==
- Ford Simulator
- Ford vs. Chevy
