= TeamXbox =

Gaming media website

- Website type: Gaming website
- Available in: English
- Owner: Ziff Davis
- Editors: Rae-Michelle Langdon (lead editor), Jesse Lord (final editor-in-chief)
- Website: teamxbox.com (archived)
- Commercial: Yes
- Registration: Optional
- Launched: 2000
- Current status: Inactive

TeamXbox was a gaming media web site dedicated to Microsoft's Xbox, Xbox 360 and Xbox One platforms. While most of the content was Xbox and Xbox 360 related, the site occasionally covered general technology and other video game news.

TeamXbox was founded in 2000 by Brent "Shockwave" Soboleski and Steve "Bart" Barton. In 2001, Sol Najimi, of MSXbox, agreed to merge the MSXbox forums with the TeamXbox news site creating one of the largest Xbox focused fan sites. Media conglomerate IGN Entertainment, Inc. purchased TeamXbox in 2003, which in turn was purchased by News Corporation in 2005. Regular updates ceased in August 2012 when the site transitioned into an archive of its previous content.

As of March 1, 2018, the domain is no longer accessible.
