= Team Yankee (board game) =

1987 Board game

Box cover

Team Yankee, subtitled "A Game of World War III", is a board wargame published by Game Designers' Workshop (GDW) in 1987 that is based on the book of the same name by Harold Coyle.

== Description ==
Team Yankee is a two-player tank combat game based in West Germany during a hypothetical World War III.

=== Components ===
The bookcase game box contains:

- two double-sided paper hex grid maps scaled at 200 m (220 yd) per hex
- 240 die-cut counters
- rule book
- storage tray
- six-sided die
- background booklet

=== Scenarios ===
The game comes with eight scenarios, each based on action from the contents of Harold Coyle's book. Each scenario uses a progressive set of rules, so that the players know how to use all the optional rules by the final scenario. There are also instructions on how to design a scenario.

=== Gameplay ===
The movement and combat rules are a simplified version of a traditional "I go, You go" system. The basic rules are not complex, and as Ellis Simpson noted, Team Yankee was marketed to new gamers using a "First Battle" label on the box. During each turn, the first player has several phases:

1. List artillery targets, and roll a die to see if air units are available
2. Attack with some or all units where they are
3. Movement. (Opponent may have opportunity for reactive fire.)
4. Attack (any unit that did not fire in Phase 2
5. Fire artillery

The second player then has the same phases to end the current turn.

== Publication history ==
In 1987, Presidio Press published Harold Coyne's first novel, Team Yankee, which was based upon a tank battle scene in General Sir John Hackett's political thriller The Third World War: The Untold Story. As a promotional tie-in, GDW published a licensed wargame of the same name, designed by Frank Chadwick and Marc W. Miller, featuring the same cover art as the novel.

In 1990, a video game of the same name was published by Empire Software, but it was based directly on the novel, not on GDW's game. Likewise, starting in 2015, Battlefront Miniatures published a series of miniatures wargames that were based on Coyle's novel, but were also unrelated to GDW's wargame.

== Reception ==
In Issue 11 of Gateways, Jonathan Frater commented, "The game itself is rather was to learn, fun to play, and based as closely as possible on real-life vehicles and conditions without sacrificing playability."

Other reviewers found the game rules simple and suitable for beginning players, but agreed that the scenarios were seriously unbalanced, always leading to a one-sided battle.

- In Issue 3 of Games International, Ellis Simpson liked the game components, which he found "up to the usual GDW standard." He also found the rules easy to understand and well illustrated. But after playing the first three scenarios (out of eight), Simpson found all of them unbalanced, writing, "The main problem is a game system which combines the chance to hit and the damage capability into one number. On a tactical level it simply will not hold up, either in theory or in practice." He concluded by giving the game a very poor rating of only 1 star out of 5, saying, "I hesitate to criticise two designers who are far more qualified than me. However, in my humble opinion this game is a turkey."
- Writing for Centurion Review, David Lent found the game good for beginners, "much easier than most wargames, because there is a limited number of rules listed followed by a scenario that uses them. Between each scenario, more rules are presented and the next scenario uses them." However, Lent found the scenarios to be very unbalanced, writing "It usually becomes obvious really quick, which side has a lopsided advantage of winning. In some scenarios, it was nearly impossible for one of the sides to win unless their opponent did something illogical." He concluded by giving the game an overall rating of 7.2 out of 10, saying "This game is very easy to learn and fun to play."

== Awards ==
At the 1988 Origins Award, Team Yankee was awarded the Charles S. Roberts Award for "Best Boardgame of 1987 Covering the Period 1947-Modern Day".

== Other reviews and commentary ==
- Battleplan #7
- Casus Belli #46 (Aug 1988)
- Best Games of 1988 in Games #94
