= Team Yankee =

1987 novel by Harold Coyle

- First edition
- Author: Harold Coyle
- Language: English
- Genre: War novel Techno-thriller
- Publisher: Presidio Press
- Publication date: August 1987
- Publication place: United States
- Media type: Print (hardback & paperback)
- ISBN: 0-89141-290-5
- OCLC: 15132325
- Dewey Decimal: 813/.54 19
- LC Class: PS3553.O948 T4 1987

Team Yankee is a techno-thriller novel written in 1987 by Harold Coyle, then a major in the United States Army. Set during the World War III scenario outlined in Sir John Hackett's novel The Third World War: The Untold Story, the novel follows the titular United States Army armored company-sized team in combat against the Soviet Union after the Warsaw Pact invades Western Europe. While Hackett's book emphasizes strategy and world politics, Coyle's features the experiences of the tank crews and infantrymen fighting on the front lines.

Team Yankee was Coyle's first novel, and its success made Coyle a prominent writer in the field of military fiction. The novel achieved best-selling status and inspired a series of comic books, an Origins Award-winning board wargame, and a video game. In 2015, it was adapted as a sister scenario for the Flames of War wargame.

== Plot ==
Over the summer of an unspecified year, relations between the United States and the Soviet Union deteriorate rapidly, particularly in the Persian Gulf. By August, NATO forces are mobilized and moved to the Inner German border between West Germany and East Germany. Among the mobilized NATO forces is Team Yankee, an average U.S. Army armored team under First Battalion, 4th Armored Division. Captain Sean Bannon is the company commander, First Lieutenant Robert Uleski is the executive officer, and First Sergeant Raymond Harrert is the first sergeant. Team Yankee is composed of First Platoon (Lieutenant Murray Weiss), Second Platoon (Second Lieutenant McAllister), Third Platoon (Second Lieutenant Gerry Garger), and the Mech Platoon (Staff Sergeant Polgar). Each platoon has four M1 Abrams tanks for a total of ten across the team, as well as five M113 armored personnel carriers, two M901 ITV TOW missile vehicles, an M113A4 AMEV, and an M88 recovery vehicle. The Mech Platoon is also equipped for anti-tank warfare, armed with M47 Dragon anti-tank missiles and M72 LAW rocket launchers. When deployed to Germany under brigade commander Colonel Brunn and Major Jordan, Team Yankee is attached to Task Force 3-78 Mechanized Infantry, led by Lieutenant Colonel Reynolds and composed of Team Yankee, mech-heavy (one tank, two mech platoons) Team Bravo, standard infantry C Company (Captain Craven), standard infantry D Company, and an M981 FISTV-equipped artillery team (Second Lieutenant Rodney Unger).

On August 3, with the increasingly likely possibility of war, Bannon sends his wife Pat and their children to Rhein-Main Air Base to flee the country alongside other civilians, while also preparing to replace Garger for repeatedly troubling him. Suddenly, as Reynolds inspects TF 3-78's positions, the Soviets attack, and Team Bravo's company commander is killed. Team Yankee repels the attack, and Bannon notes Garger's competence in combat. That evening, Pat and her children arrive at Rhein-Main and narrowly board an American aircraft as the Soviet Air Forces indiscriminately bomb fleeing civilians, while Bannon learns the staff are more enthusiastic about war than the soldiers who have actually seen combat.

The next day, Team Yankee attacks Hill 214, but receives conflicting orders from Reynolds and Jordan to attack and halt respectively. Bannon's tank driver and Lt. McAllister, are killed, but Bannon and his surviving crew manage to destroy three T-62 tanks before destroying their crippled M1 Abrams to prevent its capture and commandeering Uleski's tank. C Company, intended to support them, never arrives, forcing the team to defend Hill 214 throughout the night. Bannon's loader, PFC Richard Kelp, assists Private McCauley and an anti-tank infantryman from the Mech Platoon into battle, but the gunner is killed, and Kelp and McCauley use his launcher to destroy a T-72 targeting them, earning Kelp a Silver Star.

The members of Team Yankee fall asleep and wake up several hours after they were expected to withdraw, and Bannon charts a way to return to U.S. lines in daylight with minimal casualties where, to Bannon's fury, they find C Company, having apparently held there the entire time. Bannon reports to his superiors and Team Yankee is placed in reserve for reinforcing and recovery. Second Lt. Avery, an inexperienced Armor School classmate of Garger's, reports as McAllister's replacement, but finds himself isolated from his new comrades.

On August 8, Team Yankee's brigade is ordered to follow up a Bundeswehr counterattack into East Germany through the Thuringian Forest towards Leipzig and Berlin to cut off the Soviet offensive against the Northern Army Group, and Team Yankee is ordered to lead the attack. Bannon however expresses doubts to Reynolds that the rest of the battalion, particularly C Company, can carry out their role in supporting the armor teams. The attack is delayed when the enemy, a Polish People's Army T-55 battalion, launches its attack first, but the team repels them and Avery gets his first kill, forcing the Polish battalion to retreat. TF 3-78 stops to consolidate its gains, but the Polish battalion returns to attack C Company, prompting TF 3-78, assisted by a German company and American artillery, to respond in force and crush the Polish battalion. The Mech Platoon advances to secure the nearest town, but is attacked by a member of the Free German Youth, who is killed after wounding a soldier.

TF 3-78 sets up their headquarters in East Germany. Avery is wounded by a Soviet helicopter and his tank is damaged, but it is quickly salvaged as it is due back in combat the next day. Suddenly, the headquarters is attacked; several soldiers are wounded or killed, C Company is almost entirely wiped out, Reynolds is severely wounded, and Jordan is cut off from reaching the others. Bannon reorganizes TF 3-78 and leads a counterattack to repel the Soviets and rescue Jordan and the staff. TF 3-78, resuming activities under Jordan, coordinates an ambush against a Soviet battalion approaching their position and a town, using scout troops and area denial artillery munitions in a reverse slope defense to force them into Team Yankee's lines.

By this point, NATO is running short on equipment and manpower, forcing major unit reorganizations to maintain the offensive, and Team Yankee is moved from TF 3-78 to TF 1-4 Armored, their original unit, to continue the advance to Leipzig and Berlin. Team Yankee is assigned a screening role to the main effort, and is ordered to conduct a feint attack against a bridge over the Saale River, but the speed of their attack and internal conflicts between the Soviet Army and the KGB allow the First Platoon to capture the bridge intact.

The next day, Bannon learns the Soviet Union has launched a nuclear attack on Birmingham, England, and that NATO has retaliated with a nuclear attack against Minsk, Belarus. TF 1-4 is ordered to prepare for nuclear warfare, CBRN defense, and the effects of nuclear war, and Bannon braces for a nuclear exchange. Suddenly, news comes in that the Soviet Union and Warsaw Pact are collapsing and a ceasefire has been ordered. The ceasefire ultimately holds, ending the devastating war after only two months. A National Guard division relieves the 4th Armored Division, and Bannon returns to quarters to reconnect with Pat and their children.

== Adaptations ==
=== Board games ===
- GDW Games published Team Yankee under license, authored by Frank Chadwick and Marc W. Miller, as a part of their "First Battle" series of wargames that shared the same basic rules. In the March 1989 edition of Games International (issue #3), Ellis Simpson reviewed the game and was not impressed, giving it a poor rating of only 1 out of 5 and called it "a turkey".
- While not directly based on the novel, the game World at War: Eisenbach Gap by Mark H. Walker is based on events and units as laid out in the Team Yankee book and John Hackett's book The Third World War.

=== Comic book ===
First Comics published a six-issue comic book series based on Team Yankee, which was reissued as a graphic novel in 1989. David Drake wrote the strip.

=== Video game ===
In 1990, British video game developer Oxford Digital Enterprises developed Team Yankee, a computer wargame published by Empire Software for Amiga, Atari ST, MS-DOS, and Commodore CDTV, following a premise and plotline based on the novel. The game received two sequels, Pacific Islands in 1992 and War in the Gulf in 1993, both unrelated to Team Yankee.

=== Tabletop game ===
In November 2015, the tabletop wargaming system Flames of War released the miniature based table-top game Team Yankee, inspired by both The Third World War and Team Yankee novels. It allows the player to build a Team Yankee, NATO, or Warsaw Pact force to play with. It also has missions based on those from the novel.
