= Team Yankee (video game) =

1990 video game

- Developer: Oxford Digital Enterprises
- Publisher: Empire Software
- Artists: Kevin R. Ayre; Gareth B. Williams
- Platforms: Amiga, Atari ST, MS-DOS, CDTV
- Release: 1990
- Genres: Computer wargame, real-time strategy, simulation video game
- Mode: Single-player

Team Yankee is a 1990 real-time strategy simulation computer wargame developed by Oxford Digital Enterprises and published by Empire Software for Amiga, Atari ST, MS-DOS, and Commodore CDTV. Based on Harold Coyle's novel (itself in turn based on Sir John Hackett's novel The Third World War: The Untold Story) and board game of the same name, the game depicts a World War III scenario between the United States and the Soviet Union from an armoured warfare perspective.

Gameplay is conducted both from a map of the area and in a 3D environment with 2D sprites. The game features numerous iconic Cold War-era armoured fighting vehicles, including the M1 Abrams, M2 Bradley, M113, T-62, T-72, and BMP-2, among others.

Team Yankee was released to somewhat negative reception from critics for its "arcade-like" gameplay and its lack of infantry or military aircraft. The game received two sequels, Pacific Islands in 1992 and War in the Gulf in 1993.

== Reception ==
1992 and 1994 Computer Gaming World surveys of wargames with modern settings gave the game two stars out of five, describing it as "an arcade-like product trying to pass as a simulation of modern tactical armored warfare". A full review by the magazine in 1992 criticized Team Yankee's lack of infantry (making the machines guns useless) or air power (despite the aircraft on the box art). The magazine concluded that it, while more realistic than Pacific Islands, was not for "the hard-core wargamer, but are for people who enjoy a quick and relatively easy run-through of a tank game".
