= Norman Macrae =

British economist and journalist (1923–2010)

Norman Alastair Duncan Macrae CBE (1923 – 11 June 2010) was a British economist, journalist and author, considered by some to have been one of the world's best forecasters when it came to economics and society.

== Career ==
Macrae joined The Economist in 1949 and retired as its deputy chief editor in 1988. He foresaw the Pacific century, the reversal of nationalization of enterprises, the fall of the Berlin Wall and the spread of the internet, which were all published in the newspaper during his time there. He contributed to the books The Third World War: August 1985 (1978) and The Third World War: The Untold Story (1982), both attributed to General Sir John Hackett but mostly written by several collaborators.

Not to get bored, Macrae's first ten years in retirement produced the biography of John von Neumann (the mathematical father of computers and networks), a column for the UK Sunday Times, and a 'Heresy Column' for Fortune. He was the father of mathematician, marketing commentator, and author Chris Macrae. 2025 REPORT, their joint future history on death of distance, first published in 1984, forecast that 2005–2025 would be humanity's most critical decades, irreversibly impacting sustainability. The last update of 2025 REPORT was published in Swedish in 1993 as Den Nye Vikingen.

== Honours ==
- Order of the Rising Sun, with Gold Rays, 1988.
- Commander, Order of the British Empire, 1988.

== Books ==
- Macrae, Norman (1984). The 2024 Report: A Concise History of the Future 1974–2024. Sidgwick & Jackson. p. 198. ISBN 0-283-99113-5.
- Macrae, Norman (1985). The 2025 Report: A Concise History of the Future, 1975–2025. Macmillan Publishing. p. 272. ISBN 0-025-79090-0.
- John von Neumann: The Scientific Genius who Pioneered the Modern Computer, Game Theory, Nuclear Deterrence, and Much More (1992), Random House, reprinted by the American Mathematical Society, 2008, ISBN 978-0-8218-2676-8.
