= Red Storm Rising =

1986 novel by Tom Clancy

- First edition cover
- Author: Tom Clancy; Larry Bond
- Language: English
- Subject: World War III
- Genre: War novel; Techno-thriller; Military fiction
- Publisher: G.P. Putnam's Sons
- Publication date: August 7, 1986
- Publication place: United States
- Media type: Print (hardcover, paperback)
- Pages: 656
- ISBN: 0399131493

Red Storm Rising is a war novel, written by Tom Clancy and Larry Bond, (Note: While Bond is not credited on the book's jacket, Clancy's "Author's Note" preface states that he and Bond were "co-authors" and that "this book is [Bond's] as much as mine.") and released on August 7, 1986. Set in the mid-1980s, it features a Third World War between the North Atlantic Treaty Organization and Warsaw Pact forces, and is notable for depicting the conflict as being fought exclusively with conventional weapons, rather than escalating to the use of weapons of mass destruction or nuclear warfare. It is one of two Clancy novels, along with SSN (1996), that are set outside the Ryanverse.

The book debuted at number one on the New York Times bestseller list. It eventually lent its name to game development company Red Storm Entertainment, which Clancy co-founded in 1996.

== Plot ==
Muslim militants from Soviet Azerbaijan destroy an oil production refinery in Nizhnevartovsk, threatening to cripple the Soviet Union's economy due to oil shortages. After much deliberation, the Soviet Politburo decides to seize the Persian Gulf by military force in order to recoup the country's oil losses. Knowing that the United States had pledged to defend the oil-producing countries in the Persian Gulf, the Soviets decide that neutralizing NATO is a necessary first step before its military operation can take place. If West Germany were to be neutralized and occupied, the Soviets believe that the United States would not move to rescue the Arab states since it could meet its oil needs from the Western Hemisphere alone.

To divert attention from the impending operation, the Politburo embarks upon an elaborate maskirovka to disguise both their predicament and their intentions. The Soviets publicly declare their arms reduction proposal to scrap their obsolete nuclear missile submarines. The KGB then carries out a false flag operation involving a bomb being detonated in a Kremlin building, framing a KGB sleeper agent as a West German intelligence spy involved in the incident. The Politburo publicly denounces the West German government and calls for retaliation.

Even though a planned attack on a NATO communications facility in Lammersdorf was compromised when a Spetsnaz officer was arrested, the Soviet Army pushes through with their advance operations in Germany. They suffer reverses on the first night of the war, however, when NATO stealth and fighter-bomber aircraft achieve air superiority over Central Europe by eliminating Soviet fighter and AEW&C aircraft, and destroying key bridges that much of the Soviet Army has yet to cross. Soviet-bloc tank divisions find an early advantage, however, in their authoritarian command structure: all Warsaw Pact forces have been trained to speak Russian (as the Soviets have deliberately put themselves in command of the Warsaw Pact), while NATO tank crews find themselves confused at crucial moments as to who is in charge and how to speak to one another. NATO armies are repeatedly forced to give ground, though they resist bitterly nonetheless.

Out in the Atlantic, Soviet Navy achieves a decisive early victory by launching a bold amphibious landing on Iceland, taking control of the NATO airbase in Keflavík. This is followed up by a substantial air attack against a combined American-French carrier battle group that was originally sent to reinforce Iceland with several landing ships full of US Marines. The ensuing battle results in serious losses to NATO's navies; the French Navy's Foch is sunk, and the landing ship USS Saipan explodes, taking over 2,000 sailors and Marines with her, while USS Nimitz is forced to drydock in Britain to undergo lengthy repairs. While NATO's naval forces remain a significant threat, the Soviets are left in control of the strategically important GIUK gap.

NATO and Soviet air and ground forces continue to battle ferociously in Germany, with both sides taking heavy losses. General-Colonel Pavel Alekseyev, the de facto Soviet senior commander on the ground, scores a breakthrough in a tank battle at Alfeld, opening the possibility of a Soviet advance beyond the Weser River with far less opposition from NATO forces. Meanwhile, a naval attack on Soviet bomber bases with cruise missiles launched by US Navy submarines opens a window for an amphibious counter-assault on Iceland, retaking the island and effectively closing the Atlantic to Soviet forces. Among the action, a Soviet prisoner captured during the retaking of Iceland reveals the true cause of the war, and a NATO air offensive swiftly destroys much of the Soviet military's available fuel supplies.

With Iceland retaken, the United States is able to resupply the rest of NATO via the reopened sea lanes. By this point, Soviet tank and strategic bomber formations have taken punishing losses, forcing them to further cede the initiative as NATO prepares to mount a decisive counteroffensive. Mobilizing older tanks like the T-55 only adds to Warsaw Pact casualties, leaving the Warsaw Pact completely on the defensive.

The Soviet leadership begins to realize that they face the possibility of outright defeat—either through a NATO military breakthrough or a war of attrition which, given their desperate shortage of oil supplies, would amount to the same result. The General Secretary considers using nuclear weapons to force a favorable end to the war. This infuriates Alekseyev, who had been mobilizing for a final counterattack on Germany but faces execution by the Soviet government for its slow timetable. The KGB chief organizes a coup along with Alekseyev and other members of the Politburo. The new Soviet government then negotiates for a ceasefire with NATO and a return to status quo ante bellum, ending the war.

== Characters ==
=== NATO ===
- Edward Morris: Commanding officer of USS Pharris and later USS Reuben James.
- Daniel X. McCafferty: Commanding officer of Los Angeles-class submarine USS Chicago.
- Robert A. Toland III: NSA analyst and naval reservist, later promoted to commander in the United States Navy Reserve.
- Michael D. Edwards, Jr.: First lieutenant in the United States Air Force serving as a meteorological officer at Naval Air Station Keflavik in Iceland. Leads intelligence gathering there during the Soviet occupation of the island with the code name of "Beagle", later receiving a Navy Cross for his bravery.
- Jerry "The Hammer" O'Malley: Lieutenant Commander in the USN serving as a helicopter pilot aboard Reuben James. Receives a Distinguished Flying Cross for his antisubmarine warfare work.
- Amelia "Buns" Nakamura: F-15C pilot for the USAF who becomes the first American female fighter ace by shooting down three Tu-16 Badger bombers while on ferry duty and later using ASM-135 anti-satellite missiles to destroy at least two Soviet naval radar reconnaissance satellites. She also becomes the first Space Ace because of her satellite shoot-downs.
- Terry Mackall: Sergeant First Class in the United States Army serving as an M1 Abrams tank commander in the 11th Armored Cavalry Regiment on the German front. Receives a battlefield promotion to lieutenant for his valor and leadership skills.
- Colonel Douglas "Duke" Ellington: USAF officer and commander of the F-19 Stealth squadron
- Colonel Charles DeWinter "Chuck" Lowe: Officer in the United States Marine Corps who works with Bob Toland before the conflict and later as the commanding officer of a Marine regiment in the invasion force that recaptured Iceland. Lowe had served three tours of duty in Vietnam and received a Navy Cross for his bravery in that war.
- General Eugene Robinson: Supreme Allied Commander Europe. Robinson had served three Tours of duty in Vietnam and commanded the 101st Airborne Division. Robinson is a supremely skilled gambler, which he uses to hide how desperately overstretched NATO forces are late in the war when he meets with Colonel-General Alekseyev to negotiate a cease-fire.
- William Calloway: British Reuters correspondent and SIS agent.
- James Smith: Sergeant in the United States Marine Corps serving under Lieutenant Edwards in Iceland.

=== Soviet Union ===
- Pavel Leonidovich Alekseyev: Deputy Commander of the Southwest Front and then Commander in Chief-Western Theater after briefly serving as second in command. Exceptionally brave and given to leading from the front personally, Alekseyev briefly takes command of a Soviet tank division after NATO artillery fire wipes out its entire command staff, leading to the key Warsaw Pact victory at Alfeld. After the coup, he is made Deputy Minister of Defense and Chief of the General Staff of the Soviet Armed Forces.
- Mikhail Eduardovich Sergetov: Energy Minister and non-voting member of the Soviet Politburo. After the coup, he becomes acting General Secretary.
- Ivan Mikhailovich Sergetov: Alekseyev's aide-de-camp and Sergetov's son. Promoted to major during the war.
- Major Arkady Semyonovich Sorokin: Soviet VDV officer whose daughter Svetlana dies in the Kremlin bombing. Later recruited by Alekseyev for the coup.
- Boris Georgiyevich Kosov: Chairman of the Committee for State Security (KGB). Mastermind of the coup, only to be killed in revenge by Major Sorokin.
- Marshal Andrei Shavyrin: Chief of the General Staff. Later executed by the Politburo for failing to bring favorable results on the war.
- Marshal Yuri Rozhkov: Commander-in-Chief of the Soviet Army. Executed along with Marshal Shavyrin.
- Marshal Fyodor Borisovitch Bukharin: Commander of the Kiev Military District. Later promoted to the head of the General Staff after Shavyrin and Rozhkov's execution, then forced into retirement after Alekseyev's Coup.
- Andrei Ilyich Chernyavin: Spetsnaz officer assigned to sabotage the NATO command post at Lammersdorf.

=== Other characters ===
- Vigdis Agustdottir: Icelandic civilian rescued by Edwards from Soviet soldiers and who is romantically involved with Edwards as the novel closes.
- Patrick Flynn: Associated Press Moscow Bureau chief
- Ibrahim Tolkadze: Militant Islamist of Azerbaijani descent working as an oil field engineer. He and his confederates Rasul and Mohammed instigate the road to war by infiltrating the oil refinery where Ibrahim works, murdering multiple security and technical personnel, and triggering numerous pipe ruptures that set the entire refinery and adjacent oil field ablaze. All of them are killed when security forces storm the control room.
- Gerhard Falken: Alleged West German Federal Intelligence Service agent behind the Kremlin bombing.

== Themes ==
Allegiances of nations involved in the war described in the book

Red Storm Rising depicts a future Third World War, chiefly between the United States and the Soviet Union. It follows the "future war" genre first popularized by the 1871 novella The Battle of Dorking by George Tomkyns Chesney as well as the science fiction novel The War in the Air (1908) by H.G. Wells. Red Storm Rising is unusual among Cold War examples of the genre in that it presented a war fought entirely using conventional weapons rather than one with nuclear weaponry or chemical weaponry. For instance, The Third World War: August 1985 describes a conflict based on fairly similar assumptions, but involving heavy use of chemical weaponry and with limited use of strategic nuclear weapons at the conclusion of the conflict.

According to a document released by the UK National Archives in December 2015, U.S. President Ronald Reagan had recommended Red Storm Rising to UK Prime Minister Margaret Thatcher shortly after the Reykjavík Summit in 1986 between him and Soviet general secretary Mikhail Gorbachev so as to gain an understanding of the Soviet Union's intentions and strategy. Some of the advanced weapons systems described in the novel were deployed four years later in the Gulf War.

== Development ==
Tom Clancy met Larry Bond in 1982. The two discussed Convoy-84, a wargame Bond had been working on at the time that featured a new Battle of the North Atlantic. The idea became the basis for Red Storm Rising. "We plotted out the book together, then, while I researched the military issues, Tom wrote the book," Bond said. "I'm listed as co-author, but I wrote like 1 percent of the book," Bond stated in a 2013 interview. For research on the Politburo scenes, Clancy and Bond interviewed Soviet defector Arkady Shevchenko.

Clancy had purchased Bond's wargame Harpoon as a source for his novel The Hunt for Red October (1984). Clancy and Bond used the board game's second edition miniature rules to test key battle sequences, notably the Soviet operation to seize Iceland and the attack on the carrier battle group in the "Dance of the Vampires" chapter.

=== Dance of the Vampires ===
This refers to the chapter in which the Soviets lure a NATO carrier group into a trap and almost manage to wipe it out.

The game sessions typically involved several players on each side (Clancy among them) acting in various roles. with Bond refereeing. The games did not influence the outcome — the chapter's ending was already decided — but they gave Clancy and Bond a "better understanding of what factors drove each side's thinking".

This attention to detail made Vice consider Red Storm Rising a "great example of fictional military history."

The collected and annotated notes on the three Dance of the Vampires scenario playthroughs would later be published by Bond.

== Publication ==
In 1987, the book was published in French as Tempête Rouge (Red Storm), translated by France-Marie Watkins, with the collaboration of Jean Sabbagh.

== Reception ==
Like its predecessor, The Hunt for Red October, the book received critical acclaim for its accurate military narrative. Publishers Weekly praised it as "fascinating and totally credible story, told with authenticity and great suspense". Kirkus Reviews hailed it as "an informative, readable, sometimes dazzling speculation on superpower war".

== Game adaptations ==
In December 1988, MicroProse released a Red Storm Rising video game, in which the player commands an American submarine against Soviet forces. The player has the option of choosing between both single missions or campaign and which era to play in; modern missions offer the player more advanced submarines and weapons, but also a more technologically advanced adversary as well.

In 1989, TSR, Inc. released the Red Storm Rising board game designed by Douglas Niles, based on the book. The game won the Origins Award for Best Modern-Day Boardgame and Best Graphic Presentation of a Boardgame in 1989.

== See also ==
- The Third World War: The Untold Story, by John Hackett
  - Team Yankee by Harold Coyle
- Red Army, by Ralph Peters
- World War III in popular culture
- Seven Days to the River Rhine
