= Rowan Software =

British software company

- Industry: Video games
- Founded: 1987
- Number of employees: 12

Rowan Software was a British software company focused on the development of computer games. The company was founded by Rod Hyde in 1987 and based in Runcorn, Cheshire. Rowan was best known as a publisher of flight simulators for the PC.

The company was involved with a number of publishers including Mirrorsoft, Mindscape, Spectrum Holobyte, Virgin, and Empire Interactive. Rowan's involvement with Mirrorsoft included development of the strategy/role-playing title Duster which collapsed when Mirrorsoft was declared bankrupt.

In 1989, Martin Kenwright left with several members of Rowan's staff to form Digital Image Design. Rowan itself was acquired by Empire Interactive in December 2000.

== Games ==
Games by Rod Hyde before founding Rowan Software

- Strike Force Harrier (1986)
- Harrier Combat Simulator (1987)

By Rowan Software

- Harrier Combat Simulator (1988, DOS port)
- Falcon Operation: Counterstrike (1989)
- Falcon Operation: Firefight (1990)
- Flight of the Intruder (1990)
- Reach for the Skies (1993)
- Overlord (1994)
- Dawn Patrol (1994)
- Navy Strike (1995)
- Air Power: Battle in the Skies (1995)
- Flying Corps (1997)
- MiG Alley (1999)
- Rowan's Battle of Britain (2000)

== See also ==
- Fleet Street Publisher
