= Field of Fire =

The field of fire is the area around a weapon or weapons that can be reached by bullets, shells, arrows, or other projectiles.

Field(s) of Fire may also refer to:

== Art, entertainment, and media ==
=== Games ===
- Field of Fire (video game), 1984 video game for Atari 8-bit computers
- Fields of Fire (game), 2009 card/campaign historical simulation game
- War Along the Mohawk (also known as Fields of Fire: War Along the Mohawk), 1998 strategy video game
- Field of Fire, fictional first-person shooter in the internet web series Video Game High School
- Fields of Fire (Shadowrun), 1994 supplement for the role-playing game Shadowrun

=== Literature ===
- Fields of Fire (novel), 1978 novel by James Webb

=== Music ===
Albums

- Field of Fire (album), album by Richard Lloyd
- Fields of Fire (album), 1986 album by Corey Hart

Songs

- "Fields of Fire" (song), 1983 song by Big Country

=== Television ===
Series

- Fields of Fire (TV series), an Australian television series

Episodes

- "Field of Fire" (Star Trek: Deep Space Nine), a seventh-season episode of Star Trek: Deep Space Nine
