= Air Power =

Airpower is a type of military strength.

AirPower or Air Power may also refer to:

- AirPower (charging mat), a cancelled wireless charging mat developed by Apple Inc.
- Air Power (TV series), a 1950s historical educational TV series
- Air Power (video game), 1995

== See also ==
- Air and Space Power Journal, formerly Airpower Journal
- Wind power
