= Dawn Patrol (video game) =

1994 video game

- Amiga box art
- Developer: Rowan Software
- Publisher: Empire Interactive
- Designers: Rod Hyde, Mark Shaw
- Platforms: Amiga, MS-DOS
- Release: 1994
- Genre: Combat flight simulator
- Mode: Single player

Dawn Patrol is a World War I combat flight simulator by Rowan Software. It was released in 1994 for Amiga and MS-DOS. The game's front end takes the form of a hyperlinked book describing the history of the war in the air, the aircraft, and some of the famous aces who flew them, with each page featuring a mission directly related to the subject. The player may choose to fly each mission on the side of the British Royal Flying Corps or the German Air Service, flying many early fighter aircraft such as the SE5a and Fokker Dr.I featured on the box illustration. The Amiga version came with a book called Richthofen: The man and the aircraft he flew.

Dawn Patrol: Head to Head was released in 1995 by Rowan Software as an improved version of Dawn Patrol and additionally featured one-on-one dogfighting via serial modem connection.

== Reception ==
Amiga Computing gave the game a rating of 88%.

Reception

Review scores
Publication	Score
Computer Gaming World	3/5
PC Gamer	83%

== Legacy ==
Flying Corps also by Rowan Software (working title: Dawn Patrol 2) was the unofficial successor to Dawn Patrol and Dawn Patrol: Head to Head.
