= Picture Perfect Golf =

1994 video game

- Developer: Lyriq International
- Publisher: Empire Interactive
- Platform: Windows
- Release: October 1994
- Genre: Golf

Picture Perfect Golf is a 1994 video game from Empire Interactive. It is one of three games developed by Lyriq International. The other two being Lyriq Crosswords and Discovering Endangered Wildlife.

== Gameplay ==
Picture Perfect Golf offers photorealistic, first-person golfing, featuring actual photography of courses like Harbor Town Golf Links in Hilton Head, South Carolina. Players interact using either a standard mouse or an optional infrared club—an innovation adapted from Japanese company GolfTek—that simulates a real-life swing. The infrared interface, sold separately, allows players to engage with the game using actual golf motions.

== Development ==
The game was developed by Lyriq International, a company founded in 1991 in Cheshire. It was showcased at the Winter Consumer Electronics Show in Las Vegas.

== Reception ==
Reception

Review scores
| Publication | Score |
|---|---|
| Computer Gaming World | 2/5/5 |
| PC Joker | 49% |
| PC Player | 54% |
| PC Games | 61% |
| Secret Service | 70% |

Bill Goodykoontz from Arizona Republic said in his review that "The Commentary is adequate, however, the swing mechanism is tough to master" in the end concluding "A fun, if challenging, game, and certainly different"

Picture Perfect Golf generated almost $300,000 in revenue.

Picture Perfect Golf was named one of the top 100 CD-ROMs by PC Magazine.
