= Dance of the Vampires (disambiguation) =

Dance of the Vampires may refer to:

- Dance of the Vampires, the UK title of the 1967 film The Fearless Vampire Killers
  - Dance of the Vampires (musical), a German-language musical based on the film
- Dance of the Vampires, a fictional pivotal battle featured in the 1986 war novel Red Storm Rising by Tom Clancy and Larry Bond
