= Hanna Barbera's Turbo Toons =

1994 video game

- Developer: Empire Interactive
- Publisher: Empire Interactive
- Designers: Adrian Barritt; Graham Rice
- Programmer: Adrian Barritt
- Artist: Graham Rice
- Composer: Richard Horrocks
- Platform: Super Nintendo Entertainment System
- Release: EU: November 1994
- Genre: Racing
- Modes: Single-player, multiplayer

Hanna Barbera's Turbo Toons is a 1994 racing video game developed and published by Empire Interactive in Europe for the Super Nintendo Entertainment System. Players compete in footraces featuring a choice of six Hanna-Barbera characters, including Huckleberry Hound, Quick Draw McGraw, Top Cat, Snagglepuss, Hong Kong Phooey, and Yogi Bear. During races, the players can also gather crystals that enhance their abilities or harm their opponents.

Turbo Toons was co-designed by artist Graham Rice and programmer Adrian Barritt. Barritt aimed to create a five-player game where characters interacted by knocking each other off the track, borrowing aspects from the racing game Super Sprint. The team found Hanna-Barbera difficult to work with, as the studio insisted that the characters look like "perfect" duplicates of the original cartoons. Production began in February 1994 and concluded in July 1994. Additional versions were planned for release in North America and on the Sega Mega Drive, but were never published.

Turbo Toons received generally unfavorable reception from critics. Most praised the game's simultaneous multiplayer mode, but other reviewers criticized its graphics, soundscapes, track design, controls, and gameplay.

== Gameplay ==
Huckleberry Hound, Top Cat, Snagglepuss, Hong Kong Phooey, Yogi Bear, and Quick Draw McGraw in Wally Gator's Swamp

Hanna Barbera's Turbo Toons is a top-down racing game featuring characters from the Hanna-Barbera cartoons. The player selects a character and participates in a footrace on one of thirty single-screen race courses, trying to finish in first place. There are six playable characters, each with unique traits: Huckleberry Hound, Quick Draw McGraw, Top Cat, Snagglepuss, Hong Kong Phooey, and Yogi Bear. The game features four modes including a training mode, a single race mode, a league mode with five tracks per league, and a battle mode where players compete to collect 50 crystals.

During each race, the player is able to collect power-up crystals scattered across the course, with different effects on the character. These include temporary enhancements to speed, acceleration, grip, and energy, as well as a virus that creates a rain cloud to harm other players. The players also collect white crystals that can be exchanged for upgrades to acceleration, top speed, grip, or turbo. Players can stun other characters by jumping on them, and each track also has unique obstacles, such as water hazards or other Hanna-Barbera characters trying to interfere. Up to five players can participate simultaneously using the Super Multitap.

== Development and release ==
Hanna Barbera's Turbo Toons was created by Empire Interactive, a British game developer and publisher. It was co-designed by Graham Rice, as well as Adrian "Ade" Barritt, who had previously worked on Space Ace (1994) for the Super Nintendo Entertainment System. Barritt served as the game's sole programmer, while Rice handled the artwork under the guidance of Hanna-Barbera animator Iwao Takamoto. The music was composed by Richard "Champie" Horrocks, who later worked on the Pro Pinball series and co-founded Fuse Games with Barritt.

Production began in February 1994, with Barritt aiming to design a five-player racing game where characters could knock each other off the track. The team was inspired by the racing game Super Sprint, including its top-down point of view and power-ups. As Super Sprint lacked interaction between the cars, the team made each character act differently. Barritt found Hanna-Barbera difficult to work with, as the team had to work closely with the studio in the game's production and insisted that the characters be changed until they became "perfect" duplicates of the original cartoons. Development lasted six months and concluded in July 1994.

The game was first announced at the 1994 ECTS Spring under the title Hanna Barbera's Crazy Cartoon Chase, and was published in Europe by Empire Interactive in November 1994 under its final title, Turbo Toons. The game was rated by the ESRB and Allan planned to release it in North America in July 1995. Despite being reviewed by multiple sources, it was not released in the region. A Mega Drive version was also planned but never released.

== Reception ==
Reception

Review scores
Publication	Score
Computer and Video Games	65/100
HobbyConsolas	77/100
M! Games	54%
Mega Fun	76%
Official Nintendo Magazine	20/100
Super Play	42%
Total!	53/100
Play Time	76%
Power Unlimited	5/10

Hanna Barbera's Turbo Toons received generally unfavorable reviews from critics. An editor for HobbyConsolas found the game's graphics simple and the single-player mode monotonous, but praised the music and simultaneous multiplayer gameplay. Mega Fun's Götz Schmiedehausen and Play Time's Stephan Girlich commended the game's playability, characters, and multiplayer, but found the soundtrack boring. Nintendo Fun Vision's Jochen von Nida said that the game becomes more enjoyable with more players, but thought the visuals were average.

Andrew Osmond of Computer and Video Games criticized the single-screen races for feeling restrictive and lacking challenge, while also noting that the game's small bright character sprites made it seem like a "junior" game. MAN!AC's Robert Bannert recommended the game for younger players, but criticized the courses for their simplicity and lack of obstacles. Total!'s Danny Wallace and Andy Dyer enjoyed its five-player mode, but criticized the game's small sprites, dull audio, level design, and gameplay. Power Unlimited's Andreas Urhahn criticized the game, saying the "characters are cool but if you know them, you are a bit too old for this nonsense".

Super Play's Zy Nicholson faulted the game for its lack of substance and its repetitive soundscapes. An editor for Nintendo Magazine System (Official Nintendo Magazine) criticized Turbo Toons for its poor graphics, music, awkward controls, and lack of depth, stating that "it's aimed at a younger market, [but] that's a poor excuse for such a travesty".
