= Navy Strike =

1995 video game

- Developer: Rowan Software
- Publisher: Empire Interactive
- Platform: MS-DOS
- Release: 1995
- Genre: Combat flight simulation
- Mode: Single-player

Navy Strike is a 1995 combat flight simulation video game developed by Rowan Software and published by Empire Interactive for MS-DOS.

== Gameplay ==
Navy Strike includes three United States Armed Forces aircraft: F-22 Raptor, F/A-18E Super Hornet, and fictional AX, resembling F-117 Nighthawk.

The game has a strategy mode called Commander Module. This feature allows the command of air assets for a naval task force in the China Sea, Persian Gulf, or Libya. The player receives orders to perform tasks like neutralizing airstrips or enforcing no-fly zones, and are given a set number of assets. The player can set paths, designate targets, watch missions on a small video screen, or choose to fly the missions themself.

VGA and SVGA graphics modes are supported.

== Reception ==
Reception

Review scores
Publication	Score
Joystick	74%
PC Gamer (US)	80%
PC Games (DE)	65%
Génération 4	2/6
PC Player (DE)	64%
Play Time	71%

Navy Strike received generally average reviews from critics. PC Gamer said the game feels like Dawn Patrol adapted to a modern setting. It was also compared to U.S. Navy Fighters by saying: "If you're not interested in the Commander section, or don't care for unrealistic flight models, then U.S. Navy Fighters is the better bet." In conclusion Navy Strike was called "a good introductory sim". PC Games said the game has only inherited the weaknesses of its predecessor, Dawn Patrol. PC Player compared the game unfavorably to U.S. Navy Fighters and Flight Commander 2. Joystick described the 3D graphics as "fast" and mission design as "interesting" but disliked the lack of realism and sound effects. Génération 4 liked the realism of the missions and squadron management but disliked the interface and sound.
