= Speedball 2: Brutal Deluxe =

1990 video game

- European cover art by Glenn Fabry
- Developer: The Bitmap Brothers
- Publishers: Image Works; Arena Entertainment; Empire Interactive; Akella; Tower Studios; SOFEL
- Designer: Eric Matthews
- Programmer: Robert Trevellyan
- Artist: Daniel Malone
- Composer: Nation 12
- Platforms: Acorn Archimedes, Atari ST, Amiga, CD32, Commodore 64, MS-DOS, Master System, Game Boy, Game Boy Advance, Mega Drive, Windows Mobile, PlayStation, Xbox 360, iPhone, Symbian
- Release: 1990
- Genres: Sports, action
- Modes: Single-player, multiplayer

Speedball 2: Brutal Deluxe is a sports action video game developed by The Bitmap Brothers and initially released for the Amiga and Atari ST in 1990. It is a sequel to the 1988 game Speedball, and therefore, it is based on a violent futuristic sport that draws on elements of handball and ice hockey, and rewards violent play as well as goals. The concept of the game is reminiscent of the 1975 film Rollerball. The original game was developed by The Bitmap Brothers, with various remakes for many platforms since being published.

The game was released for multiple platforms: the Acorn Archimedes, Atari Jaguar, Atari ST, Amiga, Amiga CD32, IBM PC compatibles, Commodore 64, Mega Drive, Master System, Game Boy and Game Boy Advance.

== Plot ==
According to the game's story, the first Speedball league (founded in 2095) fails due to violence and corruption. As the organisation gives rise to anarchy, the game is forced underground, but five years later, in an attempt to regain public interest, Speedball 2 is born. The game starts in 2105 with the emergence of a new team, Brutal Deluxe.

== Gameplay ==
Speedball 2 makes several changes over the original Speedball. Each team has nine players on court rather than five, and targets on the floor and walls can be hit for bonus points. The number of points that a team receives for scoring a goal is normally 10, but can be increased to 15 or 20 via the use of score multiplier ramps located on the walls of the pitch. The same number of points for scoring a goal is given for injuring a player from the opposing team. When a player is injured, he is replaced by one of the three substitutes. If all three substitutes are injured, the injured player will be forced to return to the game and play on in spite of his injuries. There are five game modes: knockout, cup, league, practice and multiplayer. Each game lasts for 180 seconds, divided into two halves.

== Reception ==
Reception

Review scores
Publication	Score
Mega	81%
Sega Force	90%
MegaTech	92%

Awards
Publication	Award
Mega	7th best game of all time
Golden Joystick Award	Best Soundtrack
Amiga Power	3rd best game of all time

Speedball 2 is one of Bitmap Brothers' most successful titles. Zzap, CU Amiga and Computer and Video Games scored the game highly. The music, written by Simon Rogers and remixed and coded by Richard Joseph, won the 1991 Golden Joystick Award for Best Soundtrack. The voices, including the 'Ice Cream' salesman, were voiced by sometime Richard Joseph collaborator Michael Burdett working under the pseudonym Jams O'Donnell. The game was voted the 3rd best game of all time in Amiga Power.

In 1994, PC Gamer US named Speedball 2 the 24th best computer game ever. The editors wrote, "You just can't beat this game for pure action." That same year, PC Gamer UK named it the 30th best computer game of all time, calling it "totally convincing and very stylish".

In 1998, PC Gamer declared it the 40th-best computer game ever released, and the editors called it "still one of the funnest sports games out there".

Speedball 2 has sold over two million copies.

== Remakes ==
Various remakes of Speedball 2 have been released.

=== Speedball 2100 ===
Reception

Aggregate score
Aggregator	Score
Metacritic	60/100

Review scores
Publication	Score
Consoles +	85%
Edge	4/10
Electronic Gaming Monthly	1.5/10
Eurogamer	4/10
GameSpot	7/10
IGN	7.4/10
Jeuxvideo.com	14/20
M! Games	38%
PlayStation Official Magazine – Australia	7/10
Video Games (DE)	57%
Fun Generation	63%

Speedball 2100, released only for the PlayStation, is a 3D version of Speedball 2 with more options such as choosing and renaming any team, instead of having to play with Brutal Deluxe. This version, released in September 2000, failed to win over gamers and press because it lacked the speed and gameplay of the originals. Speedball 2100 will be released on Evercade as part of the Bitmap Brothers Collection 1.

=== Speedball 2: Brutal Deluxe (2007) ===
Empire Interactive released Speedball 2: Brutal Deluxe onto Xbox Live Arcade on October 17, 2007. The game features a 3D graphics mode in addition to the "classic" visuals, as well as additional teams and online play. According to statements by the Bitmap Brothers, this version of the game takes place in the 24th century. It was eventually delisted from Xbox Live Arcade, but people who have already downloaded it are still able to play it.

=== Speedball 2 Tournament ===
Frogster Interactive Pictures released a remake developed by Kylotonn, Speedball 2 Tournament onto Steam in November 2007.

=== Speedball 2: Evolution ===
In February 2011, Tower Studios released another updated version called Speedball 2: Evolution, developed by Vivid Games for iOS and MacOS. The game features multiplayer support and achievements via Game Center. It was also released for the PlayStation Portable and PlayStation 3.

=== Speedball 2 HD ===
An enhanced port of Speedball 2: Evolution, titled Speedball 2 HD, was released December 5, 2013, on Steam. Also developed by Vivid Games, this PC port was directed by Jon Hare. As its name suggests, the game features support for high definition.
