= Reach for the Skies (video game) =

1993 video game

- Developer: Rowan Software
- Publisher: Virgin Games
- Platforms: Amiga, Atari ST, MS-DOS
- Release: 1993
- Genre: Combat flight simulation
- Mode: Single-player

Reach for the Skies is a 1993 combat flight simulation video game developed by Rowan Software and published by Virgin Games for the Amiga, Atari ST, and MS-DOS.

== Gameplay ==
The game is set on the southeast coast of England during the Battle of Britain. Players have the option to fight for either the Royal Air Force (RAF) or the Luftwaffe. After that is the choice of playing as either the pilot or the controller. Pilots fly in missions and take out enemy aircraft. Controllers make strategic decisions for the battle. The game offers two control options: simple or easy. Simple mode uses basic joystick directions and a fire button. Help systems like autogun and autopilot are offered. Autogun fires the gun automatically when an enemy is over the gunsights. Autopilot flies the plane automatically between predesignated points.

== Reception ==
Reception

Review scores
Publication	Score
Aktueller Software Markt	48/60 (DOS)
Amiga Format	90% (1993); 89% (1995)
Atari ST User	85%
CU Amiga	59%
The One	81% (Amiga)

Amiga Format compared the game to Their Finest Hour and said Reach for the Skies is "much more playable on a low-end Amiga" and has "the edge in speed and lasting playability". In conclusion it was called "an excellent flight simulator". The One gave a positive review but recommended to try Knights of the Sky first. CU Amiga summarized: "Excellent ideas poorly implemented. A waste." Atari ST User concluded "It's not exactly original stuff, but it's damn exciting and damn realistic."
