= Overlord (1994 video game) =

- Amiga box art
- Developer: Rowan Software
- Publisher: Virgin Interactive
- Designer: Paul Dunscombe
- Platforms: Amiga, MS-DOS
- Release: 1994
- Genre: Combat flight simulator
- Mode: Single-player

Overlord is a combat flight simulator by Rowan Software. It was released in 1994 for Amiga and PC MS-DOS platforms.

== Gameplay ==
It is based on Operation Overlord, the Allied invasion of continental Europe during World War II. The player is tasked with flying a series of historically accurate missions for the Royal Air Force, flying Spitfire IX, Hawker Typhoon, and Mustang III aircraft.

== Reception ==
Next Generation reviewed the PC version of the game, rating it three stars out of five, and stated that "D-Day: Operation Overlord doesn't play any better than other flight sims that are already available [...] This title is strictly for WW II buffs or flight-sim fanatics."

== Reviews ==
- PC Format (Dec, 1995)
- Amiga Power (Nov, 1994)
- Amiga Format (Dec, 1994)
- The One Amiga (Jan, 1995)
- CU Amiga (Feb, 1995)
- ASM (Aktueller Software Markt) (Sep, 1994)
- Power Play (Aug, 1994)
- MikroBitti (Sep, 1994)
- Amiga Joker (Jan, 1995)
- Australian Commodore and Amiga Review (Oct, 1995)
