= Strike Force Harrier =

1986 video game

- Publisher: Mirrorsoft
- Designer: Rod Hyde
- Platforms: BBC Micro, Amstrad CPC, ZX Spectrum, Commodore 64, MS-DOS, Amiga, Atari ST
- Release: 1986
- Genre: Combat flight simulation
- Mode: Single-player

Strike Force Harrier is a 1986 combat flight simulation video game designed by Rod Hyde and published by Mirrorsoft for the 8-bit home computers. 16-bit ports were released later.

== Gameplay ==
The game simulates the flying of the British attack aircraft Harrier jump jet, known for its vertical takeoff and landing. The objective is to attack an enemy base 250 miles away, filled with MiG fighters, SAM sites, and tanks. The game can't be cleared in one go, each sector must be cleared to establish landing, refuelling, and rearming bases for the land forces. A HUD displays essential information on the cockpit window. A radar screen plots the position and any enemies nearby. Red traces warn of missiles requiring evasive action.

== Reception ==
Reception

Review scores
Publication	Score
ACE	6/10 (ST)
Aktueller Software Markt	36/48 (C64)
Amtix	90%
Crash	83% (ZX)
Computer and Video Games	37/40 (BBC); 31/40 (C64); 29/40 (ZX)
Zzap!64	68% (C64)
Commodore User	8/10 (C64, Amiga)
Computer Gamer	80% (ZX)

Award
Publication	Award
Sinclair User	SU Classic

Amtix called the game better than Skyfox and Spitfire 40. They summarized the game as "[a] simply superb fight simulation with loads of potential". Crash said that "though by no means the best on the Spectrum, Strike Force Harrier is quite reasonable. As a flight sim, this is pretty good". Computer and Video Games reviewed the BBC Micro version and concluded: "A classy, polished and highly addictive simulation, this is a game to keep". When reviewing the Commodore 64 and ZX Spectrum versions they said that "Strike Force Harrier is set to become a classic of its type on all formats". Zzap!64 summarized: "Not a brilliant flight simulator, but one of the more exciting on the market".

== See also ==
- Harrier Combat Simulator, a 1987 video game by the same designer and publisher, simulating the same aircraft
