= Sega Bass Fishing 2 =

2001 video game

- North American box art
- Developer: WOW Entertainment
- Publishers: Sega; Acclaim Entertainment (Note: Acclaim published the PlayStation 2 version of Sega Bass Fishing 2)
- Series: Sega Bass Fishing
- Platforms: Dreamcast, PlayStation 2
- Release: August 21, 2001: Dreamcast; NA: August 21, 2001; JP: August 30, 2001 PlayStation 2; NA: September 23, 2002; JP: October 24, 2002; EU: March 14, 2003
- Genre: Sports
- Modes: Single player, multiplayer (Note: The multiplayer functionality is only available in the PlayStation 2 port, Sega Bass Fishing Duel)

Sega Bass Fishing 2, known in Japan as Get Bass 2 (Note: Japanese: ゲットバス2, Hepburn: Getto Basu Tsū), is a 2001 fishing video game developed by WOW Entertainment and published by Sega for the Dreamcast. It is the sequel to Sega Bass Fishing. The game was later reworked and rereleased for the PlayStation 2 as Sega Bass Fishing Duel, or Get Bass Battle in Japan, which served as a multiplayer expansion to the original Dreamcast title.

Upon release, Sega Bass Fishing 2 received positive reviews from critics, garnering better aggregator scores than its previous entry. Critics praised the game's graphics, visuals, and simplicity, but criticism was drawn towards the game's mechanics, difficulty, and the initial exclusion of multiplayer functionality.

== Gameplay ==
While the game can be played with the standard Dreamcast controller, it was designed to support the console's Fishing Controller. The game is single-player.

== Development ==
Sega Bass Fishing 2 was developed as a sequel to Sega Bass Fishing. Originally an arcade game, its Dreamcast port in 1999 had been unexpectedly successful.

== Release ==
Sega Bass Fishing 2 was released on 21 August 2001 in North America, and on 30 August in Japan for the Sega Dreamcast.

In 2002, Sega Bass Fishing 2 was ported to the PlayStation 2 as Sega Bass Fishing Duel, which included a multiplayer expansion. In released on 23 September in North America, 24 October in Japan, and 14 March in Europe the following year.

== Reception ==
Reception

Aggregate score
Aggregator	Score
Metacritic	DC: 76/100

Review scores
Publication	Score
Edge	DC: 5/10
Famitsu	DC: 27/40
Game Informer	DC: 8.5/10
GameSpot	DC: 8.6/10
GameSpy	DC: 9/10
IGN	DC: 8.3/10
Next Generation	DC: 2/5

Sega Bass Fishing 2 received generally favorable reviews, according to the review aggregation website Metacritic. Edge cited the game's emphasis on simulation over arcade elements as a downside, compared to the arcade style of the first one. Conversely, GameSpot lauded the game as "a model example of what sequels should be." However, Eric Bratcher of NextGen said that the game was "More realistic, but not more fun. This is easily Sega's deepest fishing title, but it's alternately too hard or too easy." In Japan, Famitsu gave it a score of 27 out of 40. Four-Eyed Dragon of GamePro said, "The sequel to one of the best fishing games ever unfortunately delivers nothing but a fishy stench instead of a prize catch-of-the-day." (Note: GamePro gave the game 4/5 for graphics, 2/5 for sound, 4.5/5 for control, and 2.5/5 for fun factor.)

== See also ==
- Sega Marine Fishing – 2000 video game
