= War in the Gulf =

1993 video game

- Cover art
- Developer(s): Oxford Digital Enterprises
- Publisher(s): Empire Interactive
- Platform(s): Amiga, Atari ST, DOS
- Release: 1993
- Genre(s): Simulation, strategy
- Mode(s): Single-player

War in the Gulf is a third game in the tank combat series, following from Team Yankee and Pacific Islands. The game imagines a situation in which Iraq invades Kuwait for a second time.

== Gameplay ==
The player commands the platoon of 16 tanks presented on screen split in four pieces. Each piece is a command center for four units. The player must control the tanks by moving them and shooting on arcade screen and planning their moves on the tactical screen. Action is purely mouse-driven. A major consideration involves destroying buildings for money and preventing other from being destroyed.

== Reception ==
Reception

Review scores
Publication	Score
Amiga Power	(AMI) 85%
ST Format	(AST) 92%
The One	(AMI) 82%
CU Amiga	(AMI) 83%
Atari ST User	(AST) 89%
