= Harrier Combat Simulator =

1987 video game

- Developers: H+H Software; Eigen Software; Rowan Software (DOS)
- Publishers: EU: Mirrorsoft; NA: Mindscape
- Designer: Rod Hyde
- Platforms: Atari ST, Amiga, IBM PC, Commodore 64
- Release: NA: 1987; EU: 1987
- Genre: Flight simulator
- Mode: Single-player

Harrier Combat Simulator (also known as High Roller) is a combat flight simulation game published in 1987 by Mindscape for the Commodore 64. Ports for Amiga, Atari ST and IBM PC (as a self-booting disk) followed in 1988.

== Gameplay ==
Gameplay screenshot (Atari ST)

Harrier Combat Simulator is a game in which the player assumes the role of a pilot in a Harrier-jet. The player needs to become proficient in flying the jet, including its horizontal and vertical thrust and its advanced weaponry. The player pilots the only jet fighter that was not destroyed in a saboteur attack, and will need to destroy the headquarters of the enemy before they can launch a successful attack to destroy the Sixth Fleet. Most of the missions take place in Grenada, which was undergoing an American-led military invasion during the year 1984.

== Development ==
In a 1988 article, STart reported that Harrier Combat Simulator had been developed with assistance from British Aerospace.

== Reception ==
Harrier was reviewed in 1988 in Dragon #131 by Hartley, Patricia, and Kirk Lesser in "The Role of Computers" column. The reviewers gave the game 4 out of 5 stars. The Palm Beach Post that year said that the game "would have been a pretty impressive simulator a couple of years ago", but compared to Falcon, Fokker Triplane, Gunship, and F/A-18 Interceptor, Harrier was "primitive" and "silly". Computer Gaming World rated the game a 2 of 5 in 1991 and 1992.

Writing for STart, David Plotkin praised the Atari ST version's graphics and realistic portrayal of the Harrier's flight characteristics. He also highlighted its multiple difficulty settings and challenging gameplay.

== See also ==
- Strike Force Harrier, a 1986 video game by the same designer and publisher, simulating the same aircraft
- Rowan Software, the company that Rod Hyde founded after designing Harriet Combat Simulator
