= Animal Paradise =

2007 video game

- Developer: Agatsuma Entertainment
- Publishers: JP: Agatsuma Entertainment; WW: Empire Interactive
- Platform: Nintendo DS
- Release: JP: April 26, 2007; EU: November 16, 2007; NA: September 23, 2008
- Genre: Life simulation
- Mode: Single-player

Animal Paradise (アニマルパラダイス, Animaru Paradaisu) is a 2007 video game by Agatsuma Entertainment for the Nintendo DS. It was originally slated for release in North America as Pocket Pets, by O~3 Entertainment. Empire Interactive later published the title as Animal Paradise, as it had already done in Europe. The game features famous photographs in the Hana Deka style by Japanese photographer Yoneo Morita. Its sequel, Animal Paradise Wild, was released in 2009.

== Animal Paradise Wild ==
Animal Paradise Wild
- Developer: Dearfield
- Publisher: Zoo Games
- Platform: Nintendo DS
- Release: NA: October 6, 2009
- Genre: Life simulation
- Mode: Single-player

Animal Paradise Wild is a video game developed by Dearfield and published by Zoo Games, as a sequel to Animal Paradise for the Nintendo DS.

== Reception ==
Animal Paradise received generally poor reviews, receiving a rating of three out of ten from Nintendo World Report and a Metascore of 49.
