= The Civil War (video game) =

1995 video game

- Developer: Dagger Interactive Technologies
- Publisher: Empire Interactive
- Platform: DOS
- Release: NA: 1995; DE: 1995
- Genre: Strategy

The Civil War is a 1995 video game by British studio Dagger Interactive Technologies and published by Empire for DOS.

== Gameplay ==
The Civil War is a real-time strategy game involving training, production and supply.

== Reception ==
Reception

Review score
Publication	Score
Computer Game Review	71/64/68

The game received a mixed-to-negative review from Computer Game Review. In 1996, Computer Gaming World declared The Civil War the 10th-worst computer game ever released.
