= Sleeping Gods Lie =

1989 video game

- Publisher(s): Empire Interactive
- Platform(s): Amiga, MS-DOS, Atari ST
- Release: 1989
- Genre(s): Adventure

Sleeping Gods Lie is a first-person adventure game released on the Amiga, MS-DOS, and Atari ST by Empire Interactive in 1989.

== Gameplay ==
It is set in the world of Tessera, a land created by the Gods, which has fallen into the control of an evil Archmage who terrorised the populace with the aid of evil demons. The takes the role of an adventurer, with a quest through eight kingdoms. The goal is to find N'Gnir, one of the sleeping Gods who created the world, and to wake him up so he can rid the world of the demons.

== Reception ==
Tom Malcom for Info said "Sleeping Gods Lie could have used some more polish, but it's one of the most unusual and playable adventures I've been on in a long time."

Tony Dillon for ACE said "with a little more planning and a bias away from arcade toward RPG, Sleeping Gods Lie could have been a real corker. As it is, it falls uneasily between two stools."

Zzap! said "if you've the time and patience for such a big challenge Sleeping Gods Lie could just be the off-beat kind of hit you want. Less committed adventurers however, are probably best advised to try before buying."

ST Action said "As a first release, Sleeping Gods Lie is excellent. It's by no means easy but nevertheless it does keep you coming back for more."

The Games Machine said "Though most suited to RPGers (and adventurers), the arcade elements of combat and exploration open up the involving fantasy world of Tessara to action freaks also."

The One said "It's difficult to imagine who Sleeping Gods Lie could appeal to – it's far too slow-moving for most of us, and any serious RPG fan will no doubt dismiss it as lightweight piffle. Personally, it bored me to tears."

Gordon Houghton for Computer and Video Games said "A great attempt at a world simulator, combining RPG and arcade adventure; unfortunately, the scenario isn't compelling enough or the gameplay addictive enough to back it up."

Steve Cooke for The One said "If [...] you're of the broad-minded category of gamesplayer and enjoy exploration with a bit of action on the way, then SGL offers a pretty enormous challenge."

Peter Olafson for Amiga World said "If you're tired of waiting for the sequel to Drakkhen, or of waiting for any good new RPG, you'll love Sleeping Gods Lie. I recommend it wholeheartedly."

Michael Spiteri for The Australian Commodore and Amiga Review said "If you are looking for something different but still perplexing and challenging, then take a look at Sleeping Gods Lie."
