= The Golf Pro =

1998 video game

- Developer: Empire Interactive
- Publisher: Empire Interactive
- Platform: Microsoft Windows
- Release: NA: 1 April 1998; EU: 1998
- Genre: Sports
- Mode: Single-player

The Golf Pro (full title: The Golf Pro Featuring Gary Player) is a 1998 golf video game developed and published by Empire Interactive for Microsoft Windows. The game features professional golfer Gary Player, as well as two golf courses and a mouse-controlled golf swing method known as Mouse Drive. The game was generally praised for its graphics, but criticized for its limited camera angles. By early 1999, The Golf Pro 2 had been released in the United Kingdom.

== Gameplay ==
The Golf Pro features three playable golfers, including professional golfer Gary Player, who also provides advice to the player. Two real golf courses are featured: St Mellion, and Hilton Head (designed by Gary Player). To take a golf swing, the player uses a method known as Mouse Drive, in which the computer mouse is moved side-to-side to simulate the swing. Letting go of the left mouse button at certain points in the process alters the height or distance of the swing, depending on when the button is let go. For an adequate golf swing, the player must turn the mouse at certain points to alter the performance of the club head. The Mouse Drive uses precise movements from the computer mouse, and a mouse calibration process must be completed before playing. The game features commentary relating to the player's golfing.

== Development and release ==
The Golf Pro was developed and published by British company Empire Interactive, and was released for Microsoft Windows. The game was in development in 1996, but its release was delayed. The real golf courses were surveyed for use in the game. The game's courses include elements from their real-life counterparts such as trees and hazards. The game's digitized golfers were video-captured using high-speed film. The Mouse Drive uses 12,000 frames of animation to represent more than 90 potential golf swing variations. The game does not include a traditional click-based swing method, as Empire Interactive felt confident that the Mouse Drive would be adequate on its own. David Pringle, the game's project manager, said, "There's only so much you can do with the traditional click-click-click system. […] After using our Mouse Drive system, few players will wish to return to the traditional method."

Alistair Cochran was brought in to improve the game physics. Cochran was an expert on golf physics, and was the scientific advisor to The Royal and Ancient Golf Club of St Andrews. Pringle described Cochran as "basically the expert world-wide on what happens when a club hits a ball." Pringle said he was glad that Cochran worked on the game "because it means the ball physics are a lot better than they would have been."

In the United States, the game was released on 1 April 1998. The game had also been released in the United Kingdom by that time. At the time of its release, the game did not include a multiplayer feature, although one was intended to be added in later through a patch. Upon release, the game featured computer-controlled golfers for the player to compete against, although they lacked artificial intelligence and their actions were pre-recorded, making their gameplay the same during each round.

== Reception ==
Reception

Review scores
Publication	Score
Computer Games Strategy Plus	3/5
Computer Gaming World	3.5/5
GameSpot	7.2/10
PC Gamer (UK)	87%
PC Gamer (US)	81%
PC PowerPlay	87%
PC Zone	9/10; 69% (1999 review)
The Cincinnati Enquirer	3.5/5

The Golf Pro was generally praised for its graphics. Some critics also praised the game physics, with Tasos Kaiafas of GameSpot calling them "impressively realistic, so much so that the game could be used as an instructional tool." The game was criticized for its limited camera angles, and the small number of courses also received some criticism. Kaiafas was disappointed by the game's graphics, which are pre-rendered.

Gordon Goble of Computer Gaming World praised the realism of the Mouse Drive and wrote that The Golf Pro "does mouse driving better, and with more innovation and complexity, than the competition." Patrick McCarthy of PC Zone praised the game but stated that players would need to practice the Mouse Drive in order to use it adequately. Kaiafas stated that for players who have the patience to practice using the Mouse Drive, "The Golf Pro does present some new challenges that can be fun to master." James Bottorff of The Cincinnati Enquirer wrote that the Mouse Drive "offers as real a swing as I've seen on the PC. […] This is a welcome change from the traditional three-click approach."

The Pittsburgh Post-Gazette wrote, "For all its complexities, the Mouse Drive isn't that difficult to pick up" thanks to the advice given by Gary Player. Jeff Lackey of Computer Games Strategy Plus wrote, "If The Golf Pro had come out a couple of years ago, it would have been hailed as an excellent golf sim. In today's environment, it is an average golf sim with a great swing interface." Steve Owen of PC Gamer UK praised the commentary and called The Golf Pro a "very accomplished, impressive and enjoyable game, but there is little that is truly astounding or original about it." Owen criticized the difficult putting, and stated that the Mouse Drive would have been an innovative feature in 1996, but that the game's "unexpected delay, however, means that everyone else has got there first." In a 1999 review, Mark Hill of PC Zone wrote that "there's no excuse for not including an alternative" to the Mouse Drive. Hill considered the Links series and the Tiger Woods series superior.

The Golf Pro was a runner-up for "Best Sports Game" in PC Zone's 1998 Reader Awards, losing to World Cup 98.

== The Golf Pro 2 ==
By early 1999, The Golf Pro 2 had been released in the United Kingdom. It features Gary Player and one golf course: Wentworth. Craig Vaughan of PC Zone rated it 70 out of 100, stating that while the name suggests a sequel, "The Golf Pro 2 is merely a disappointing course data disc that fails to deliver anything radically new." Vaughan further described it as a "half-price, cut-down version of the excellent The Golf Pro." PC Gamer UK's Steve Owen rated it 80 percent and again criticized the putting, while stating that the game seemed like an add-on disc.
