= Coala =

1995 video game

- Developer(s): Bitfusion
- Publisher(s): Empire Software
- Platform(s): Amiga
- Release: 1995
- Genre(s): Combat flight simulator
- Mode(s): Single-player

Coala is a helicopter action game developed by Bitfusion for the Amiga. It was published in 1995 by Empire Software.

Gameplay mainly consists of entering a battle between two sides. The player flies a helicopter, and may choose between AH-64 Apache, the MI-35 Hind and the Mi-28 Havoc. When the player scores 100 points, a fictional ultimate helicopter called A88 Coala is unlocked.

Coala is one of the few Amiga games with a virtual cockpit mode. The game required a 68020 processor.
