= Speedball 2: Brutal Deluxe (2007 video game) =

- Developer: Razorworks
- Publisher: Empire Interactive
- Platform: Xbox 360
- Release: October 17, 2007
- Genre: Sports
- Modes: Single-player, multiplayer

Speedball 2: Brutal Deluxe is a remake of Speedball 2: Brutal Deluxe by The Bitmap Brothers for Amiga. The remake was developed by Razorworks and published by Empire Interactive for Xbox 360 via Xbox Live Arcade. The game was released on October 17, 2007.

The game features a conversion of the original 1991 game as well as an option to play it in an enhanced HD 3D mode. It has Xbox Live Arcade features such as Leaderboards and Achievements. The game features larger leagues with more teams, and local and Xbox Live multiplayer modes.

Publisher Empire Interactive was shut down in May 2009, and Speedball 2: Brutal Deluxe was delisted from Xbox Live Arcade shortly thereafter.

== Reception ==
Reception

Aggregate score
Aggregator	Score
Metacritic	64/100

Review scores
Publication	Score
Eurogamer	8/10
GameSpot	7/10
IGN	5.8/10
Official Xbox Magazine (UK)	8/10
Official Xbox Magazine (US)	7/10
TeamXbox	7.6/10
411Mania	6/10

The game received "mixed" reviews according to the review aggregation website Metacritic. Official Xbox Magazine UK gave the game a favorable review, nearly two months before its release date.
