= Field of Fire (video game) =

1984 video game

- Publisher: Strategic Simulations
- Designer: Roger Damon
- Programmers: Atari 8-bit Roger Damon; Commodore 64; Brian Fitzgerald
- Platforms: Apple II, Atari 8-bit, Commodore 64
- Release: 1984
- Genre: Turn-based strategy

Field of Fire is a computer wargame for the Atari 8-bit computers designed by Roger Damon and published by Strategic Simulations in 1984. The game was ported to the Commodore 64, by Brian Fitzgerald, and Apple II. Roger Damon also wrote Operation Whirlwind.

== Gameplay ==
Gameplay screenshot (Atari 8-bit)

Field of Fire focuses on recreating the wartime fate of Easy Company, one of the companies of the 1st Infantry Division during World War II. The player is tasked with leading Easy Company through eight historical battles in North Africa and Europe. As a company commander, the player gives orders to six-man teams armed with rifles, machine guns, mortars or bazookas. Each team's abilities, such as weapon range and firepower, are based on real-world factors, and managing individual teams is a big part of a successful battle.

Separate game phases allow the player to observe the battlefield, fire, move or storm nearby positions. The German forces are controlled by an AI that offers three levels of difficulty.

== Reception ==
The game has been met with positive reviews. The reviewer for Antic in the March 1985 issue found it "an excellent simulation of tactical infantry combat," while Zzap!64 gave the game an excellent 96% rating.
