= Air Power (video game) =

1995 video game

- Developer(s): Rowan Software
- Publisher(s): Mindscape
- Platform(s): MS-DOS
- Release: WW: 1995; NA: November 6, 1995
- Genre(s): Combat flight simulation

Air Power is a video game developed by Rowan Software and published by Mindscape for MS-DOS, and released on November 6, 1995.

== Gameplay ==
Air Power is a fantasy flight simulator involving dirigibles.

== Reception ==
Reception

Review score
Publication	Score
Computer Game Review	73/79/71

Computer Game Review summarized Air Power as "an interesting idea that comes up short in the game play department." In 1996, Computer Gaming World declared Air Power the 9th-worst computer game ever released.

== Reviews ==
- LeveL (Czech magazine) #11 (12/1995)
- PC Gamer Vol. 3 No. 3 (1996 March)
- PC Format (1995-12)
- GameSpot (1996-05-01)
