= Lyriq Crosswords =

1991 video game

- Developer: Lyriq International
- Platforms: Windows; Macintosh
- Release: 1991

Lyriq Crosswords is a 1991 puzzle video game from Lyriq International. It consists of puzzles from The Washington Post, Penny Press and Crossword Magazine

== Gameplay ==
Lyriq Crosswords is a puzzle program offering crosswords sourced from various publications. With four difficulty levels—children, easy, medium, and hard—it features an intuitive menu system for selecting puzzles by size and estimated completion time. Players can request hints, either by revealing a tough clue or checking the accuracy of their entries, though doing so reduces their final score. Scoring is based on puzzle difficulty, completion time, and correctness, with top performances recorded in a Top 10 list. The interface allows direct letter input by clicking squares, and while large puzzles can be viewed in full, clue numbers may be obscured unless the Zoom feature is used—though zooming sacrifices the full-grid view.

== Development ==
Lyriq Crosswords was developed by Lyriq International, a company founded in 1991 in Cheshire. It was distributed in Canada and Japan. In April 1995, Lyriq shipped The Washington Post Edition of the game.

Lyriq Crosswords was later bundled with HandWriter for Windows.

== Reception ==
Reception

Review score
Publication	Score
All Game Guide	4/5

The Houston Post praised the game's ease of use and configuration options.

Lyriq Crosswords sold 35,000 copies in the first year, according to Randal Hujar, Lyriq's co-founder.
