= Sega Bass Fishing =

1997 video game

- North American Dreamcast cover art
- Developers: AM1 (Arcade, PC); Sims (DC, Wii); Cavia (Wii); Sega (X360, PS3, iOS)
- Publisher: Sega
- Platforms: Arcade, Dreamcast, Windows, Wii, Xbox 360, Xbox Live Arcade, PlayStation Network, iOS
- Release: Arcade: JP: December 1997; NA: 1998; Dreamcast: JP: April 1, 1999; NA: October 6, 1999; EU: October 14, 1999; Windows: NA: 2001; EU: October 19, 2001; JP: December 20, 2001; WW: March 4, 2011 (digital); Wii: NA: February 26, 2008; JP: February 28, 2008; AU: March 27, 2008; EU: March 28, 2008; Xbox 360: NA: February 22, 2011; PlayStation Network: NA: October 4, 2011; EU: October 5, 2011; JP: October 5, 2011; Xbox Live Arcade: WW: October 5, 2011; iOS: NA: TBA
- Genre: Fishing
- Mode: Single player
- Arcade system: Sega Model 3

Sega Bass Fishing, known in Japan as Get Bass (ゲットバス, Getto Basu), is a 1997 arcade fishing video game developed by Sega for the Sega Model 3 hardware. The game has since been ported to the Dreamcast, Microsoft Windows, Xbox 360, PlayStation 3, and Wii.

== Gameplay ==
Sega Bass Fishing is an arcade fishing game where players attempt to hook and reel in fish with different lures. It uses a fishing rod controller, which in the arcade version includes both a working reel and a fishing line which extends into the main cabinet and changes tension and movement according to the player's actions and fish's movements. Casting is controlled using an analog stick.

Consisting of four stages at different times of the day, the game requires the player to catch a certain weight of fish within a time limit in order to move onto the next stage. The final stage allows only for one fish to be captured, but are among the largest in the game and most difficult to catch. Fish are measured under four weight classes: Small One, Average, Big One, and Huge.

== Ports ==
The game was an early title on the Dreamcast, and was compatible with the Sega Fishing Controller. It sold well and became one of the few Sega All Stars titles.

The Dreamcast port includes a practice mode and a tournament mode, where players can unlock more lures. In addition to the arcade game's four stages, four new stages are also included. Each stage can be played with different fishing conditions, such as the season, weather and time of day. The PC version of the game released in 2001 was based on the Dreamcast version.

An enhanced port of the game was released for the Wii on February 26, 2008. The game utilizes the motion controls of the Wii Remote and optionally the Nunchuck to replicate the Sega Fishing Controller. The game's graphics and user interface have been enhanced and it includes the modes, features, stages and unlockables found in the Dreamcast version. The Wii version also introduces seven more stages, bringing the number to fifteen. Arcade mode now consists of courses, with the final course unlocking the original four arcade stages. Nature Trip mode is also introduced, allowing players to practice without the background music playing.

The Dreamcast port of the game was featured in the compilation game Dreamcast Collection released in early 2011 for the Xbox 360 and PC, and as a separate digital download for Steam in March 2011, the PlayStation Store and Xbox Live Arcade in October 2011.

A new port of the game is featured in Like a Dragon: Infinite Wealth for PlayStation 4, PlayStation 5, Xbox One, Xbox Series and PC, alongside a new port of SpikeOut.

== Reception ==
Reception

Aggregate score
Aggregator	Score
Metacritic	(Wii) 59/100 (X360) 57/100

Review scores
Publication	Score
GameSpot	7.3/10
IGN	8.5/10
Next Generation	4/5

In Japan, Game Machine listed Sega Bass Fishing on their February 1, 1998 issue as being the second most-successful dedicated arcade game of the month.

Jeff Lundrigan reviewed the Dreamcast version of the game for Next Generation, rating it four stars out of five, and stated that, "Whether you're a true angler or just looking for a neat party game, buy this (and pick up a fishing controller while you're at it)."

Sega Bass Fishing received mostly positive reviews upon original release. The Xbox 360 and Wii ports received mediocre reviews.

== Sequels ==
A sequel, Sega Bass Fishing 2, developed by WOW Entertainment was released for the Dreamcast in 2001. The following year, Sega Bass Fishing Duel was released for the PlayStation 2, bringing multiplayer to the series.

Sega Bass Fishing Challenge was released in arcades in 2009. This obscure follow-up instead featured real-world fishing locations and expanded on the multiplayer elements of Sega Bass Fishing Duel by adding 4-player multiplayer as well as local tournaments.

In April 2012, an on-rails FPS crossover titled Sega Bass Fishing of the Dead was reported to be in production for Nintendo's Wii U and Nintendo 3DS, but the trailer was revealed to be an April Fools' joke by Random Encounters Entertainment.

== See also ==
- Sega Marine Fishing
