= Red Army (novel) =

1989 novel by Ralph Peters

- First edition
- Author: Ralph Peters
- Cover artist: Osyczka Limited
- Language: English
- Subject: Cold War
- Genre: Fiction
- Publisher: Pocket Books
- Publication date: May 1989
- Publication place: United States
- Pages: 403 (paperback)
- ISBN: 0-671-67669-5

Red Army is a 1989 Cold War-era war novel written by US Army intelligence analyst Ralph Peters. The story explores a Cold War scenario based on a Soviet attack on West Germany across the North German Plain, with defense provided by NATO army corps from the UK, the Netherlands, Belgium, and West Germany.

Red Army is unique among military fiction published in the US during the 1980s, as it presented the material exclusively from the perspective of officers and men in the Soviet Army.

== Plot ==
Soldiers with the Group of Soviet Forces in East Germany prepare to launch an invasion of West Germany. Soviet General Mikhail Malinsky, commander of the First Western Front, discusses the upcoming invasion with other Soviet leaders.

The plans call for a simultaneous thrust on three fronts: across the North German Plain, through the Fulda Gap, and across Bavaria. NATO commanders are to be bluffed into thinking the main assault will come at the Fulda Gap, but the main effort will be on the North German Plain, led by Malinsky. Airborne forces will be dropped deep into West Germany to disrupt the NATO rearguard.

The Soviet commanders believe that if Soviet forces are deep inside West Germany in three days, NATO will not be able to use its nuclear weapons to blunt the advance. A Soviet propaganda film about the destruction of Lueneberg (carefully produced at a Moscow studio) will be used to psychologically shock the West Germans.

When the invasion begins, the Soviets advance quickly, bypassing strong points whenever possible. The successful capture of a NATO command post and a Soviet tank company's capture and shepherding of a German refugee convoy outside Hildesheim adds to the speed of movement. The West German forces positioned on the inter-German border are gradually cut off from their resupply lines, while a unit trapped in the Cuxhaven peninsula fights to the last man. Deprived of reconnaissance assets, however, Malinsky worries that the US Army forces based near the Fulda Gap will come to the aid of the British, Dutch, and West German forces that he faces.

Day three of the war finds the Soviets nearing the industrial Ruhr valley. Hoping to forestall a complete West German collapse, remaining NATO forces in the north, joined by the strong and relatively unbloodied US Army from the south, hit Malinsky's First Western Front from all sides. It is not enough; before the NATO counterattack has a chance to succeed, the West German government asks the Soviets for a cease-fire. In the aftermath, the Soviet Army occupies all of West Germany east of the Rhine.

== See also ==
- Red Storm Rising - A Tom Clancy novel with a similar concept.
