= Flying Corps =

1997 video game

- Flying Corps Gold
- Developer: Rowan Software
- Publisher: Empire Interactive
- Platforms: MS-DOS; Windows
- Release: 16 January 1997
- Genre: Combat flight simulation game
- Modes: Single-player; Multiplayer

Flying Corps is a 1997 World War I flight simulator developed by Rowan Software and published by Empire Interactive.

== Theme ==
It was one of the most popular flight simulators of its time due to its accurate flight models and graphics, and also the novelty factor of a First World War dog fight simulator. Flying Corps is one of the few flight simulators to have dealt with the First World War - Red Baron, Knights of the Sky and the more arcade-oriented Wings have attempted to do the same, but most companies focus on modern air combat and World War II (usually the Battle of Britain).

== Plot ==
The game is split in four campaigns: The Flying Circus (1917), Battle of Cambrai 1917, German spring offensive (1918) and Hat In The Ring (1918). Several aeroplanes are available, including the Sopwith Camel, the S.E.5, the Nieuport 28, the Albatros D.III and the Fokker Dr.I.

== Development ==
Development of the game started in Summer 1994.

== Reception ==
Flying Corps was a runner-up for Computer Gaming World's 1996 "Simulation Game of the Year" award, which ultimately went to Jane's AH-64D Longbow. The editors wrote that Flying Corps "sports perhaps the best flight models ever seen on a prop-based sim; only quirky views and steep performance requirements kept it from the crown." The editors called Flying Corps "arguably the best World War I flight simulator in existence."

Flying Corps was named the 14th best computer game ever by PC Gamer UK in 1997. The editors praised its "planes so convincing you can actually taste the corned beef and dry biscuits the pilots probably had to eat".
