= Spitfire 40 =

1985 video game

- Original European cover art
- Developer: Novotrade
- Publishers: EU: Mirrorsoft; NA: Avalon Hill
- Platforms: Commodore 64, Amstrad CPC, ZX Spectrum, Atari ST, MSX
- Release: 1985
- Genre: Combat flight simulation
- Mode: Single-player

Spitfire 40 is a combat flight simulation video game developed by Novotrade and published by Mirrorsoft for the Commodore 64 in 1985.

== Gameplay ==
The game is set during the Battle of Britain where the player flies a Supermarine Spitfire. The game features two separate screens: The view from the cockpit and the instrument panel. Both have to be used in conjunction to fly the plane. Two tutorial modes are included: flying practice and combat practice.

== Reception ==
Reception

Review scores
| Publication | Score |
|---|---|
| Amtix | 85% (CPC) |
| Computer Gaming World | 0/5 (C64) |
| Crash | 90% (ZX) |
| Sinclair User | 5/5 (ZX) |
| The Games Machine (UK) | 57% (ST) |
| Your Sinclair | 9/10 (ZX) |
| Zzap!64 | 33% (C64) |

Awards
| Publication | Award |
|---|---|
| Crash | Crash Smash! |
| Your Sinclair | Megagame |

Zzap!64 summarized: “There are much better flight simulators than this – even Glider Pilot has faster graphics”. Commodore User compared the game to Spitfire Ace and said Spitfire 40 is the better of the two. Crash called the game an excellent simulation and said that it will appeal even to fans of arcade games. Your Sinclair said that “Spitfire 40 is a friendly program, not nearly so difficult to get into as some earlier simulators, and it's very engaging with its role playing element”. Sinclair User summarized: “Not quite a Classic, then, but definitely Mirrorsoft's finest hour”. Amtix called the game an “excellent program, and the best flight simulator on the Amstrad. The Games Machine reviewed the Atari ST port: “Despite the age of Spitfire 40, the thrill of combat is present...” Computer Gaming World wrote in 1991 that the game has “poor graphics and poorer execution. It flies like a bus with the maneuverability of a tractor-trailer”.

The game was a bestseller in England.
