= Sega Marine Fishing =

2000 video game

- Developer: Wow Entertainment
- Publisher: Sega
- Platforms: Arcade, Dreamcast, Windows
- Release: March 2000: Arcade; JP: March 2000 Dreamcast; NA: October 16, 2000; JP: October 19, 2000 Windows; EU: October 19, 2001; JP: February 28, 2002
- Genre: Sports
- Mode: Single-player
- Arcade system: Sega NAOMI

Sega Marine Fishing (Note: Japanese: セガ マリン フィッシング, Hepburn: Sega Marin Fisshingu) is a 2000 fishing video game published by Sega for the arcade, Dreamcast, and Windows.

== Gameplay ==
The gameplay's emphasis was on enticing fish to bite onto the lure and then successfully fighting the fish and reeling it to the boat.

As the player catches fish, they earn item cards. Items earned with these cards include fish and artifacts for an aquarium, fishing equipment, additional boats, and various goofy accessories such as different colored shorts. The game also featured two modes of online play: tournament fishing and "fish mail". In tournament fishing, players competed to catch the biggest fish within a species. Fish mail consisted of writing short messages. Players could receive random messages by catching fish.

Sega Marine Fishing can be played using the Dreamcast fishing rod controller. Players can customize their character with hats, shirts, etc.

This game is a direct sequel to Sega Bass Fishing.

== Reception ==
Reception

Aggregate score
Aggregator	Score
Metacritic	79/100

Review scores
Publication	Score
CNET Gamecenter	8/10
Edge	6/10
Electronic Gaming Monthly	7/10
Famitsu	27/40
Game Informer	8/10
GameFan	91% (Note: In GameFan's viewpoint of the Dreamcast version, one critic gave it 89, and the other 93.)
GameRevolution	C
GameSpot	7.8/10
GameSpy	7.5/10
IGN	8.2/10
Next Generation	4/5

The Dreamcast version received "generally favorable reviews" according to the review aggregation website Metacritic. Eric Bratcher of NextGen said of the game, "Any tournament or, better yet, online play would have landed this five stars. As it is, it's just cool." In Japan, Famitsu gave it a score of 27 out of 40.

In one review, Jake The Snake of GamePro called it "one of the best fishing games out there even though you can beat it too quickly. Even if you're afraid of the water, you'll be glad to hook Sega Marine Fishing." (Note: GamePro gave the Dreamcast version three 4.5/5 scores for graphics, control, and fun factor, and 4/5 for sound in one review.) In another GamePro review, Human Tornado said, "Although the game doesn't have a two player mode or the same 'wow' factor that Sega Bass Fishing did when it hit the stores, Sega Marine Fishing is a fun diversion for those times when you'd rather carry a pole than a gun or sword." (Note: GamePro gave the Dreamcast version two 4/5 scores for graphics and fun factor, 3.5/5 for sound, and 4.5/5 for control in another review.)

== See also ==
- Sega Bass Fishing 2
