= Space Ace (SNES video game) =

1994 Super NES adaptation

- Developer: Oxford Digital Enterprises
- Publishers: NA: Absolute Entertainment; JP: Imagineer; EU: Empire Interactive
- Series: Space Ace
- Platform: Super Nintendo
- Release: NA: May 1994; JP: March 25, 1994; EU: 1994
- Genre: Action
- Mode: Single-player

Space Ace is an action video game developed by Oxford Digital Enterprises and published by Absolute Entertainment, Imagineer, and Empire Interactive for the Super Nintendo Entertainment System video game console in North America, Japan, and Europe respectively. It is a version of the game of the same name, which was noted for its full-motion video cutscenes. Players control the protagonist, Dexter, who is made younger and weaker by the villain Borf, through platforming-action and shooting segments. At points, players may be able to "energize" Dexter into Ace in these platforming segments, giving Dexter the ability to shoot.

Because of the limited memory of a Super NES cartridge, the game was instead made as a side-scrolling game to accommodate the limited cartridge size. However, some cutscenes from the original have been kept albeit in low resolution.

At release, critical reception was mixed, with common praises being to do with visuals, audio, and shooting segments, while common criticisms were to do with trial-and-error gameplay and imprecision. However, contemporary critics were harsher, with Space Ace being regarded as one of the worst Super NES games by several publications. Multiple critics felt that the trial-and-error gameplay was meant to emulate the trial-and-error game of the original.

== Gameplay ==
In Space Ace, players take control of Dexter, also known as Ace when at his most powerful, who must rescue Kimmy from the villain Borf while being under the influence of an Infanto Ray that makes him younger. During gameplay, Dexter must dodge attacks and jump over pits while the perspective automatically scrolls along the path to the end of the level. Players can find various secrets and items along the way, and can also turn Dexter into Ace, at which point he can engage in combat using a gun against his enemies, which wears off eventually. Upon reaching the end of a level, players will be assessed based on number of shots taken, number of enemies destroyed, their ability, and their style, while an overall tally is also kept. Some levels take place in an overhead perspective and autoscroll, such as the Space Maze and Rocket Skate Maze, while other levels are sidescrolling levels with autoscroll. In the overhead levels, they must find a portal that leads them to the next level.

Like the original arcade version, this game has videos that play during certain events, like ending the level of being hurt by an enemy, the latter which takes a life away. When players run out of lives, the game ends.

== Development ==
The Super NES version of Space Ace was developed by Oxford Digital Enterprises. When creating this version, audio samples from the laserdisc version of the protagonist saying "Ooooh" and "Fwah" were sampled for use in this port. This caused Nintendo concern, as they thought that the 'fwah' sound - especially following the 'ooooh' sound - may be heard as a curse word.

It was published by Absolute Entertainment, Imagineer, and Empire Interactive in North America, Japan, and Europe respectively. It came out in 1994 in Europe, March 25, 1994, in Japan, and May 1994 in North America.

== Reception ==
Upon release, Space Ace was met with mixed reception. Computer and Video Games staff felt that Space Ace showed off the Super NES' color palette better than any other game on the platform. Additionally, they praised the variety of gameplay, commenting that despite having a learning curve, the game became more impressive as it went along. Consoles Plus staff found the gameplay repetitive, but appreciated it for being varied. Electronic Games writer Ross Chamberlain enjoyed gameplay of the overhead portion, but bemoaned the rest, calling it "an exercise in game play frustration." Electronic Games staff also questioned advice given by Absolute product developer Stephen Ross on making proper jumps, commenting that it seemed like Dexter would get killed no matter where they went at times.

GamePro critic Lawrence of Arcadia found the adaptation poorly done, suggesting that people wait for the Sega CD port of the arcade version to be released. They found the gameplay and controls confusing and frustrating, calling it "one of the most unplayable video games in recent memory." Game Players staff felt that the game had issues with how the enemies and obstacles behave in the same way every time, as well as how short the levels are. Video Games staff praised the visuals, finding it a shame that the game has so many segments where it feels unfair. They felt that few would experience the full game without using a cheat device. Staff for Total! Germany felt that the audio and visuals were good, but criticized it for having trial-and-error gameplay. FLUX described the game as a power fantasy for video game players, suggesting players should play The Pirates of Dark Water instead.

Despite receiving mixed reception upon release, contemporary critics were harsher. The Gamer writer Derek Draven ranked it as the worst Super NES game of all time, criticizing it for poor controls, uneven levels, and for "insulting" Don Bluth's art by including "drastically compressed snippets" of his work from the original. Den of Geek writer Matthew Byrd also included it on their own list of worst Super NES games, criticizing the publisher for trying to emulate the original Space Ace instead of making something new. Byrd suggested that the game was designed to look attractive on the box art and in advertising, but not while being played. Hardcore Gaming 101 writer Bobinator criticized it for being built around "rote memorization." Bobinator noted that while this is true of the arcade version, the Super NES version has issues with controls not working and having to focus on too many things at once. IGN writer Levi Buchanan, when he heard about the game, understood that there was no way the Super NES could handle the original game's videos, going onto criticize it for making Space Ace's "trial-and-error" gameplay worse. He found the obstacles too unforgiving and bemoaned how inconsistent it could be. Writer Chris Scullion criticized the game for its trial-and-error gameplay, calling it "gruelling" and finding it tedious to have to replay levels until he could figure out how to play it properly. Time Extension listed Space Ace as one of the worst SNES games and writer Damien McFerran said the game's "soupy, unresponsive controls and harsh difficulty [...] make it a pain to play".
