= War Along the Mohawk =

1998 video game

Fields of Fire War Along the Mohawk
- Developer: Edward Grabowski Communications
- Publisher: Empire Interactive Entertainment
- Release: EU: July 1998; NA: September 24, 1998
- Genre: Strategy

War Along the Mohawk, known in Europe as Fields of Fire: War Along the Mohawk, is a 1998 strategy video game developed by Edward Grabowski Communications and published by Empire Interactive Entertainment.

== Plot and gameplay ==
The game takes place in 1757 when France and England are fighting in the American Northeast. The player chooses a character at the start of the game and when that character dies the game is over. The player completes various missions and in between they spend their time at their fort fending off Native Americans or wild animals.

== Critical reception ==
Reception

Aggregate score
Aggregator	Score
GameRankings	59%

Review scores
Publication	Score
Computer Games Strategy Plus	3.5/5
Computer Gaming World	1/5
GameSpot	6.3/10
GameStar	46%
Hyper	60%
PC Gamer (US)	78%
PC Games (DE)	53%
PC Zone	67%

The game received mixed reviews according to the review aggregation website GameRankings.
