= Operation Whirlwind (video game) =

1983 video game

- Publisher: Broderbund
- Programmer: Roger Damon
- Platforms: Atari 8-bit, Commodore 64
- Release: 1983
- Genre: Turn-based strategy

Operation Whirlwind is a 1983 video game published by Broderbund Software for the Commodore 64 and Atari 8-bit computers.

== Gameplay ==
Operation Whirlwind is a battalion-level strategy game set in Northern France.

Players take control of individual tanks, guns, and infantry platoons, maneuvering them across a detailed tactical map while the computer acts as the opponent. Gameplay involves moving units using a cursor, with hidden enemy units revealing themselves by firing upon the player's forces. As units move closer to the enemy, the intensity of bombardment increases, potentially causing them to lose strength or be forced to halt their advance. Players can choose to rapidly advance, sacrificing some units in the process, or adopt a safer approach by inching forward cautiously.

The game also features an assault phase, during which units engage in close combat. Engineers are used to rebuild bridges to facilitate the advance.

== Reception ==
Mark J. Bausman reviewed the game for Computer Gaming World and stated, "Although not as complex as some computer wargames, this game provides the elements of a good tactical duel." Softline found the approachability to be a plus: "For people who have avoided the mammoth games by Strategic Simulations and Avalon Hill simply because each game swallows hours of one's life and there's so much information to keep track of, Operation Whirlwind is a godsend." The reviewer also complimented the writing quality of the manual. Mike Singleton in a review for Computer & Video Games, praised Operation Whirlwind for its strategic complexity and the way it manages to avoid the tedium often associated with the genre.
