= The Third World War (Hackett novels) =

War novels by General Sir John Hackett

The Third World War and The Third World War: The Untold Story
- First edition cover
- Author: Sir John Hackett
- Language: English
- Genre: War novel
- Publisher: Sidgwick & Jackson
- Publication date: 1978 and 1982
- Publication place: United Kingdom
- Media type: Print (Hardback & Paperback)
- Pages: 446 pp (first edition, hardback)
- ISBN: 0-283-98863-0 (first edition, hardback)
- Dewey Decimal: 355.4/8 19

The Third World War and The Third World War: The Untold Story are war novels by General Sir John Hackett, published in 1978 and 1982, by Macmillan in New York and Sidgwick & Jackson in London, respectively. The novels detail a hypothetical World War III waged between NATO and the Warsaw Pact in 1985, written in the style of a non-fiction historical retrospective interspersed with accounts of the conflict from the perspectives of various people.

The Third World War and The Untold Story describe largely similar events, but the latter incorporates geopolitical and technological developments made since, such as the rise of Solidarity in Poland, the Sino-Vietnamese conflicts, and the proposed militarization of space.

== Plot ==
The novel starts with the 1984 United States presidential election, in which Democratic Party nominee Walter Mondale loses to Republican Party nominee Governor Thompson of South Carolina. The world of the mid-1980s is detailed by President Thompson's advisors, who brief him on the international geopolitical situation when he takes office: Asia is flourishing economically as more Asian states, including North Korea and Vietnam, liberalize their economies (China in particular thrives thanks to Japanese partnerships); India, a notable exception to Asia's economic prosperity, is disintegrating into smaller coalitions of mutually-hostile quasi-states; the Arab Cold War is intensifying as Egypt's new unstable left-wing government grapples with Saudi Arabia; South Africa has become a federation under the bantustan system but is under threat by Nigeria, which has committed troops to the South African Border War; Ethiopia has fragmented under the incompetent rule of the Derg as separatists, including Eritrea, gain power despite Eastern Bloc assistance; and the Soviet Union's sphere of influence is rapidly shrinking as nationalism and anti-Sovietism rise throughout the Warsaw Pact and even the Soviet republics.

Meanwhile, the Politburo, coming to the consensus that its economy is stagnating and the Soviet Armed Forces may not be able to retain technological parity with the West for much longer, decides that it is within their best interests to expand the Soviet sphere of influence by force through an invasion of Western Europe. Although resistance from NATO is guaranteed, the Politburo gambles on quickly defeating its European members before the United States can mount a counteroffensive, while also keeping neutral countries out of the war and potentially causing a schism in Western Europe's defense by convincing France to stay out of the conflict. The Soviets deliberate three options:

- "Variant A": A large-scale preemptive nuclear strike alongside Spetsnaz paratrooper deployments in areas not under nuclear attack, followed by a seven-day land invasion to the Linz-Frankfurt-Dunkirk line.
- "Variant B": Identical to the above, but with chemical weapons and high explosives instead of nuclear weapons.
- "Variant C": A conventional invasion with nuclear strikes as a backup option should the invasion stall.

To avoid mutual assured destruction, the Politburo ultimately decides on Variant C as their invasion strategy, albeit augmented with chemical weapon strikes in locations where their use is deemed effective.

The catalyst for conflict comes in July 1985, when a U.S. Marine Corps unit intervenes against a Soviet incursion into Yugoslavia. In response, the Warsaw Pact mobilizes and launches a full-scale invasion of Western Europe on 4 August 1985, the 71st anniversary of the start of World War I. Soviet forces advance on Europe from East Germany and manage to thrust through West Germany towards the Rhine, while also landing forces in Norway and Turkey. Attacks are also carried out using strategic bombing campaigns, Soviet Navy firepower, and even space weapons.

However, the Soviet invasion stalls when stiff resistance from NATO halts Warsaw Pact forces along the German border at Krefeld and forces them out of the Netherlands. Compounding this setback, the Soviets fail to secure the neutrality of the other European states: Ireland sides with NATO under an agreement with France after Soviet missiles strike Shannon Airport for hosting French fighter jets and NATO anti-submarine aircraft, while Sweden mobilizes for war and assists Norway after the Soviet Air Forces repeatedly violate Swedish airspace. The Soviet Union also faces significant internal destabilization as mutinies, desertion, internal dissent, and demoralization plague the Warsaw Pact. Elsewhere in the world, the U.S. bombs Cuba, China invades Vietnam to overthrow its government, Egypt invades Libya, Japan seizes the Kuril Islands, the Frontline States and most other Soviet allies in Africa invade South Africa, and the Soviet Navy and its merchant fleet are neutralized.

As the war rapidly shifts against their favor, in an effort to prove they are still a force to be reckoned with, the Soviet Union launches a nuclear missile at Birmingham, United Kingdom, destroying it; in response, the U.S. Navy and Royal Navy launch a retaliatory nuclear strike against Minsk, Belarus, accelerating the Soviet Union's loss of control over the Warsaw Pact and their own republics. In Moscow, internal dissent reaches its peak when Soviet citizens protesting food shortages become convinced that a luxury hotel contains hoarded food for the Soviet elite and storm the building, only to find that the KGB murdered all of the patrons. The anti-government revolt rapidly swells as even the militsiya and Internal Troops side with the populace while political dissidents organize mass prison breaks, and the Soviet government loses control of the entire country outside of the Kremlin. A coup d'état launched by Ukrainian nationalists overthrows the Politburo and the Soviet Union collapses, ending World War III.

In the aftermath, the ruins of Birmingham and Minsk are preserved as war memorials named Peace City West and Peace City East respectively, fronted by immense causeways. Among the various geopolitical changes, German reunification is never achieved, as support for it has diminished both internationally and in both Germanies, each now having come to possess separate national identities. East Germany, having outlived the superpower that created it, prepares to host its first free elections in decades in 1986 to determine its future.

Inheriting the post-war world are three superpowers—the United States, the European Confederation, and an Asian confederation dominated by Japan and China—who regard each other not as political and military rivals, but as economic competitors and peaceful friends.

=== Alternate ending ===
An alternate ending unique to The Untold Story is offered as a separate chapter, told through radio transcripts and newspaper editorials. This alternative scenario assumes that NATO acquiesced to the demands of the peace movements and anti-nuclear movements of the 1950s, 1960s, and 1970s, and drastically scaled down their nuclear forces and nuclear sharing capabilities in favor of conventional forces (which they already had a disadvantage in), aside from France's Strategic Oceanic Force and the U.S.'s Strategic Air Command. In contrast, the Soviet Union's political repression and lack of freedom of speech allow them to maintain their nuclear forces, leaving the West at a major disadvantage.

In this alternate turn of events, the Warsaw Pact invasion quickly manages to overrun NATO forces in West Germany and the Low Countries. Driven by fears of Soviet occupation or a punitive bombing campaign if it refuses to comply, France withdraws from the conflict after the Soviet Union assures that it will escape occupation and attack. Unwilling to risk global nuclear war, American forces withdraw from Europe, and the remnants of NATO sue for peace.

Despite not being occupied, the United Kingdom is forced to accept a set of conditions that effectively give the Soviet Union control of British political, military, and economic institutions. National control is handed to a joint British–Soviet commission. Britain's European Economic Community membership is terminated, as are its obligations to the Treaty of Rome. A journalist predicts the Soviets will terminate trade union immunities under the law. Queen Elizabeth II remains in the United Kingdom, but most of the British royal family flees for Commonwealth states, while much of the British military escapes Soviet control by putting themselves under American, Canadian, or Australian commands.

This chapter is not included in the Macmillan edition.

== Development ==
Only a portion of The Third World War was actually written by Hackett.

Hackett had two objectives in mind: to demonstrate the necessity for Western Europe to have a strong and coordinated conventional military and to suggest that the use of nuclear weapons might not result in full nuclear warfare between the Soviets and the West. The limited use of nuclear weapons portrayed in the scenario results after one side's conventional forces have become weak and vulnerable; the other side responds quickly, albeit with limited retaliation.

== Critical response ==
Christopher Lehmann-Haupt of The New York Times thought that Hackett's proposed scenarios were too optimistic. Points that Lehmann-Haupt questioned included the portrayal of the Soviets as not initiating a major nuclear exchange and thereby a global nuclear war as they near defeat and the projecting of Western forces proceeding without critical setbacks caused by poor decisions or bad luck. The effects of the war and enlightened policies resolve many local conflicts from Ireland to Central America and in Palestine. Lehmann-Haupt criticized the novel for being too dry and swift in moving through its major incidents. However, noting that Hackett had consulted with many military and political experts, Lehmann-Haupt said that the book represented a "very high order of strategic thinking" and "a signal to the Soviets, or even a warning, of the way some Western military leaders are thinking."

== Release details ==
=== The Third World War ===
- 1978, UK, Sidgwick & Jackson (ISBN 978-028-398449-5), Pub date 1978, hardback (First edition)
- 1978, US, Macmillan (ISBN 978-002-547160-3), Pub date 1978, hardback

=== The Third World War: The Untold Story ===
- 1982, UK, Sidgwick & Jackson (ISBN 0-283-98863-0), Pub date 1982, hardback (First edition)
- 1982, US, Macmillan (ISBN 0-02-547110-4), Pub date 1982, hardback
- 1983, US, Bantam Books (ISBN 0-553-23637-7), Pub date 1983, paperback
- 1983, US, New English Library, (ISBN 0-450-05591-4), Pub date 1 July 1983, hardback

== See also ==
- Team Yankee, a 1987 novel by Harold Coyle set in Hackett's scenario
- Future War 198X, a Japanese anime war film partially based on Hackett's novel
- Red Army, by Ralph Peters, depicting a Soviet invasion of Western Europe from an entirely Soviet perspective
- Red Storm Rising, a similar World War III scenario by Tom Clancy, detailing a conventional Soviet invasion of Western Europe
