= Pacific Islands (video game) =

1992 video game

- Cover art
- Developers: Oxford Digital Enterprises; The Mystery Machine
- Publisher: Empire Interactive
- Platforms: MS-DOS, Amiga, Atari ST
- Release: 1992
- Genre: Strategy
- Mode: Single-player

Pacific Islands is a computer game published by Empire Interactive in 1992 for the MS-DOS, Amiga and Atari ST. It is the sequel to the 1987 video game, Team Yankee.

== Plot ==
Pacific Islands is a tank simulation game involving platoon-style combat. A member of the Soviet Communist Party has seized control of the fictitious Yama Yama Isles in the South Pacific that are an important outpost for the Western nations. The player will have to regain control of the islands in five missions.

== Reception ==
Computer Gaming World criticized Pacific Islands's lack of infantry (making the machines guns useless) or air power (despite the aircraft on the box art), both faults that existed with Team Yankee. The magazine concluded that it "comes closer to a Nintendo game than a wargame". The game was reviewed in 1993 in Dragon #189 by Hartley, Patricia, and Kirk Lesser in "The Role of Computers" column. The reviewers gave the game 4 out of 5 stars.
