= Empire Interactive =

British video game company

- Type: Subsidiary
- Industry: Video games
- Founded: 1987; 39 years ago
- Founders: Ian Higgins; Simon Jeffrey
- Defunct: 1 May 2009
- Fate: Administration
- Headquarters: London, England
- Area served: Europe
- Key people: Ian Higgins (CEO; 1987–2008)
- Number of employees: 55 (2009)
- Parent: Silverstar Holdings (2006–2009)

Empire Interactive was a British video game developer and publisher based in London. Founded in 1987 by Ian Higgins and Simon Jeffrey, it was acquired by Silverstar Holdings in 2006 and collapsed in 2009.

== History ==
Empire Interactive was founded by Ian Higgins (chief executive officer) and Simon Jeffrey (managing director) in 1987. In November 2000, the company acquired development studio Razorworks.

As well as full priced titles, Empire also had a budget range of titles, Xplosiv, for PC and PS2. Initially launched for PC in January 2000, Xplosiv also published titles in Europe from third parties such as Sega and Microsoft. Later, in 2003, Empire began launching titles for PS2.

In March 2002 Empire acquired music creation software eJay. The company sold internal development studio Strangelite, responsible for Starship Troopers (2005) and various PC ports of Sega games, to Rebellion Developments on 1 June 2006.

Silverstar Holdings, a U.S. public company listed on NASDAQ, offered a deal to acquire Empire Interactive in late October 2006. The deal was accepted by 90% of Empire Interactive's shareholders by late November, and so Silverstar Holdings acquired 85% of Empire Interactive's shares. The deal was valued at approximately £4.5 million. Admissions of further Empire Interactive shares on the Alternative Investments Market of the London Stock Exchange, were expected to be cancelled, effective by 20 December. Higgins stepped down from his position in May 2008. In July, Empire Interactive reduced its staff count by 30%, with the intent to sell Razorworks. Razorworks was sold to and absorbed by Rebellion Developments a few days later. Two months after Silverstar Holdings was delisted from NASDAQ in March 2009, Empire Interactive was placed into administration on 1 May 2009, with KPMG Restructuring appointed as administrator. Subsequently, 49 out of 55 employees were laid off, with the remaining six staying to aiding KPMG Restructuring in the winding-down of the company. Empire Interactive's intellectual property was sold to U.S.-based company New World IP. Shortly thereafter, U.S. publisher Zoo Publishing acquired an exclusive licence for the publishing and distribution of Empire Interactive from New World IP.

In late June 2026, Işık Şekercigil, a British–Turkish dual citizen with a background in mobile gaming, claimed to have acquired the Empire Interactive trademark and established a company by that name. Unter this brand, Şekercigil further said to have obtained the brand for the defunct 3DO console and the intellectual property for some games by the 3DO Company with plans to revive the console and remaster the games. The former was to include a retro console and a licensable console ecosystem, akin to the original 3DO. Throwback Entertainment, which had previously acquired the 3DO's trademark, refuted these claims and said it had never transferred its ownership. Josh Fairhurst, the CEO of Limited Run Games, corroborated that the ownership had not changed hands and branded the revival announcement "not legitimate". In early July, Şekercigil claimed that he had obtained the trademark for "The 3DO Company" instead of the console's "3DO" brand. He further announced the abandonment of his plans for the 3DO revival, citing ownership claims raised over both games and hardware, as well as the fear of prolonged legal issues. Instead, he sought to develop original games under the Empire Interactive banner.

== Games ==
- 101st Airborne in Normandy
- 911: First Responders
- Adventures of Yogi Bear
- Animal Paradise
- Animal Paradise 2
- Antz Extreme Racing
- Bad Boys: Miami Takedown
- Big Mutha Truckers
- Big Mutha Truckers 2: Truck Me Harder
- Campaign
- Campaign II
- The Civil War
- Coala
- Combat Chess
- Crazy Taxi (PC)
- Crazy Taxi 3: High Roller (PC)
- Dino Crisis 2 (PC)
- Double Dragon (XBLA version)
- Dreamfall: The Longest Journey
- DreamWeb
- Endgame (PS2)
- Enemy Engaged: Apache vs Havoc
- Enemy Engaged: RAH-66 Comanche vs. KA-52 Hokum
- Enemy Zero (PC)
- FlatOut series
- Flying Corps Gold
- Ford Racing
- Ford Racing 2
- Ford Racing 3
- Ford Racing Full Blown (developed for SEGA Amusements Europe)
- Ford Racing Off Road
- Ford Street Racing
- Fullmetal Alchemist: Dual Sympathy
- Ghost Master
- The Golf Pro
- Go Go Copter
- Hanna Barbera's Turbo Toons
- Heavy Gear II (PC)
- Hello Kitty: Big City Dreams (DS)
- Hot Wheels: Beat That! (unpublished)
- The House of the Dead (PC)
- The House of the Dead 2 (PC)
- International Cricket Captain
- Jackass: The Game (PS2, PSP and DS versions)
- Jacked (PS2, Windows, and Xbox)
- Kuri Kuri Mix (PS2)
- The Longest Journey
- Mashed (aka Drive To Survive)
- Midtown Madness 2 (PC)
- Navy Strike (PC)
- Picture Perfect Golf (Windows)
- Panzer Dragoon (PC)
- Paraworld
- Pepsi Max Extreme Sports (PC)
- Pipe Mania
- Pro Pinball series
- RayStorm (PC)
- Sega Bass Fishing (PC)
- Sega Marine Fishing (PC)
- Sega Rally 2 (PC)
- Sega Rally Championship (PC)
- Sega Touring Car Championship (PC)
- Sheep
- Sleeping Gods Lie
- Solid Ice (PC)
- Space Ace (SNES)
- Speedball
- Speedball 2: Brutal Deluxe
- Spin Jam (PS1)
- Stars!
- Starship Troopers
- Starsky & Hutch
- Sudden Strike 3: Arms for Victory
- Taito Legends 2
- Taito Legends
- Team Yankee and its sequels Pacific Islands and War in the Gulf
- Total Immersion Racing
- Unsolved Crimes (DS)
- Victorious Boxers (PS2)
- Victorious Boxers 2 (PS2)
- Virtua Cop 2 (PC)
- Virtua Tennis (PC)
- Volfied
- War Along the Mohawk
- Warrior Kings: Battles
