= Harold Coyle =

American novelist (born 1952)

- Born: Harold William Coyle; February 16, 1952 (age 74); New Brunswick, New Jersey, U.S.
- Education: Virginia Military Institute
- Occupations: Author, writer
- Spouse: Patricia Ann Bannon (m. 1974)
- Children: 3
- Writing career
- Pen name: H.W. Coyle
- Genres: Military fiction, historical fiction, science fiction

Harold William "H.W." Coyle (born February 16, 1952) is an American author of historical and speculative fiction and of war novels including Team Yankee, a New York Times bestseller. He graduated from the Virginia Military Institute in 1974, spent 14 years on active duty with the US Army, and is a veteran of the Persian Gulf War. Other pen names include H.W. Coyle. He has co-authored books with Barrett Tillman and Jennifer Ellis.

== Bibliography ==
=== Non-Fiction ===
ARMOR Articles

- Tatsinskaya and Soviet OMG Doctrine. ARMOR. January 7, 1985.
- Book One: Genocide (Or How the NTC Came to Be). ARMOR. May 1, 1989.

=== Novels ===
==== Stand-Alone Novels ====
- Team Yankee. Presidio. 1987. ISBN 0891412905. OCLC 729771474.
- Dead Hand. Forge. 2001. ISBN 0312879199. OCLC 45804786.

===== Civil War Novels =====
- Look Away. Simon & Schuster. 1995. ISBN 0684811405. OCLC 34576899.
- Until the End: A Novel. Simon & Schuster. 1996. ISBN 0684811405. OCLC 34576899.

===== French & Indian War Novel =====
- Savage Wilderness. Simon & Schuster. 1997. ISBN 0684834332. OCLC 36719860.

===== Scott Dixon Novels =====
- Sword Point: A Novel. Simon and Schuster. 1988. ISBN 0671665537. OCLC 18135794.
- Bright Star. Simon and Schuster. 1990. ISBN 0671685422. OCLC 21043904.
- Trial by Fire: A Novel. Simon & Schuster. 1992. ISBN 0671732552. OCLC 25050158.
- The Ten Thousand: A Novel. Simon & Schuster. 1993. ISBN 0671778005. OCLC 27432246.
- Code of Honor. Simon & Schuster. 1994. ISBN 0671778013. OCLC 29564193.

===== Nathan Dixon Novels =====
- God's Children. Forge. 2000. ISBN 0312862962. OCLC 42934501.
- Against All Enemies. Tom Doherty Associates. 2002. ISBN 9780765302397. OCLC 851712165.
- More Than Courage. Forge. 2003. ISBN 0765301881. OCLC 51178042.
- They Are Soldiers. 2004. ISBN 076530547X. OCLC 53971779.
- Cat and Mouse. Forge. 2007. ISBN 9780765305480. OCLC 83608271.
- No Warriors, No Glory. Forge. 2009. ISBN 9780765318978. OCLC 290437111.

==== With Barrett Tillman ====
- Pandora's Legion: Harold Coyle's Strategic Solutions, Inc. Forge. 2007. ISBN 9780765313713. OCLC 72699621.
- Prometheus's Child: Harold Coyle's Strategic Solutions, Inc. Forge. 2007. ISBN 9780765313720. OCLC 124074915.
- Vulcan's Fire: Harold Coyle's Strategic Solutions, Inc. Forge. 2008. ISBN 9780765313737. OCLC 223884615.

==== With Jennifer Ellis ====
- Cyber Knights 1.0. Forge. 2015.
- Cyber Knights 1.1. Forge. 2015.
