= John Hackett (British Army officer) =

Australian-born British soldier, painter and author (1910–1997)

General Sir John Hackett GCB CBE DSO & Bar MC
- Born: 5 November 1910; Perth, Western Australia
- Died: 9 September 1997 (aged 86)
- Military career
- Allegiance: United Kingdom
- Branch: British Army
- Service years: 1933–1968
- Rank: General
- Nickname: "Shan"
- Service number: 52752
- Units: 8th King's Royal Irish Hussars
- Commands: British Army of the Rhine (1966–1968); Northern Army Group (1966–1968); Northern Ireland Command (1961–1963); Royal Military College of Science (1958–1961); 7th Armoured Division (1956–1958); 20th Armoured Brigade (1954–1955); Trans-Jordanian Frontier Force (1947–1948); 4th Parachute Brigade (1943–1944)
- Conflicts: Arab revolt in Palestine; Second World War; Palestine Emergency
- Awards: Knight Grand Cross of the Order of the Bath; Commander of the Order of the British Empire; Companion of the Distinguished Service Order & Bar; Military Cross; Mentioned in Despatches (6)
- Other work: University administrator, author, commentator

General Sir John Winthrop Hackett, GCB, CBE, DSO & Bar, MC (5 November 1910 – 9 September 1997) was an Australian-born British soldier, painter, university administrator, author and in later life, a commentator.

== Early life ==
Hackett, nicknamed "Shan", was born in Perth, Western Australia. His Irish Australian father, also named Sir John Winthrop Hackett (1848–1916), originally from County Tipperary, was educated at Trinity College, Dublin (B.A., 1871; M.A., 1874), and he emigrated to Australia in 1875, eventually settling in Western Australia in 1882, where he became a newspaper proprietor and editor and a politician. His mother was Deborah Drake-Brockman (1887-1965), whose parents were prominent members of Western Australian society. Her six siblings included Grace Bussell, famous for rescuing shipwreck survivors as a teenager, and Frederick Slade Drake-Brockman, a prominent surveyor and explorer.

On 3 August 1905, aged 57, Hackett Sr married Deborah Drake-Brockman, who was only 18 at the time — she later became Deborah, Lady Hackett; Deborah, Lady Moulden; and Deborah Buller Murphy — having married a director of several mining companies. They had four daughters and a son. Hackett senior died in 1916. Lady Hackett remarried in 1918.

Hackett junior received secondary schooling at Geelong Grammar School in Victoria and then travelled to London to study painting at the Central School of Art. He then studied Greats and Modern History at New College, Oxford, earning an M.A. As his degree was not good enough for an academic career, Hackett joined the British Army and was commissioned into the 8th King's Royal Irish Hussars in 1933, having previously joined the Supplementary Reserve of Officers in 1931. During his military training, he completed a thesis in history with a focus on the crusades and the Early Middle Ages, particularly Saladin's campaign in the Third Crusade, for which he was awarded a B. Litt. He also qualified as an interpreter in French, German and Italian, studied Arabic and eventually became fluent in ten languages.

== Family ==
He married Margaret Frena, daughter of Joseph Peter Frena, in Jerusalem Cathedral on 21 March 1942. Margaret outlived Hackett by a decade, dying on 14 May 2007. They had one child, Susan Veronica Hackett (20 May 1945 – December 1992).

== Early career ==
He served in Palestine during the Arab revolt, where he was mentioned in despatches in 1936, and then with the Trans-Jordan Frontier Force from 1937 to 1941, when he was mentioned in despatches.

== Second World War ==
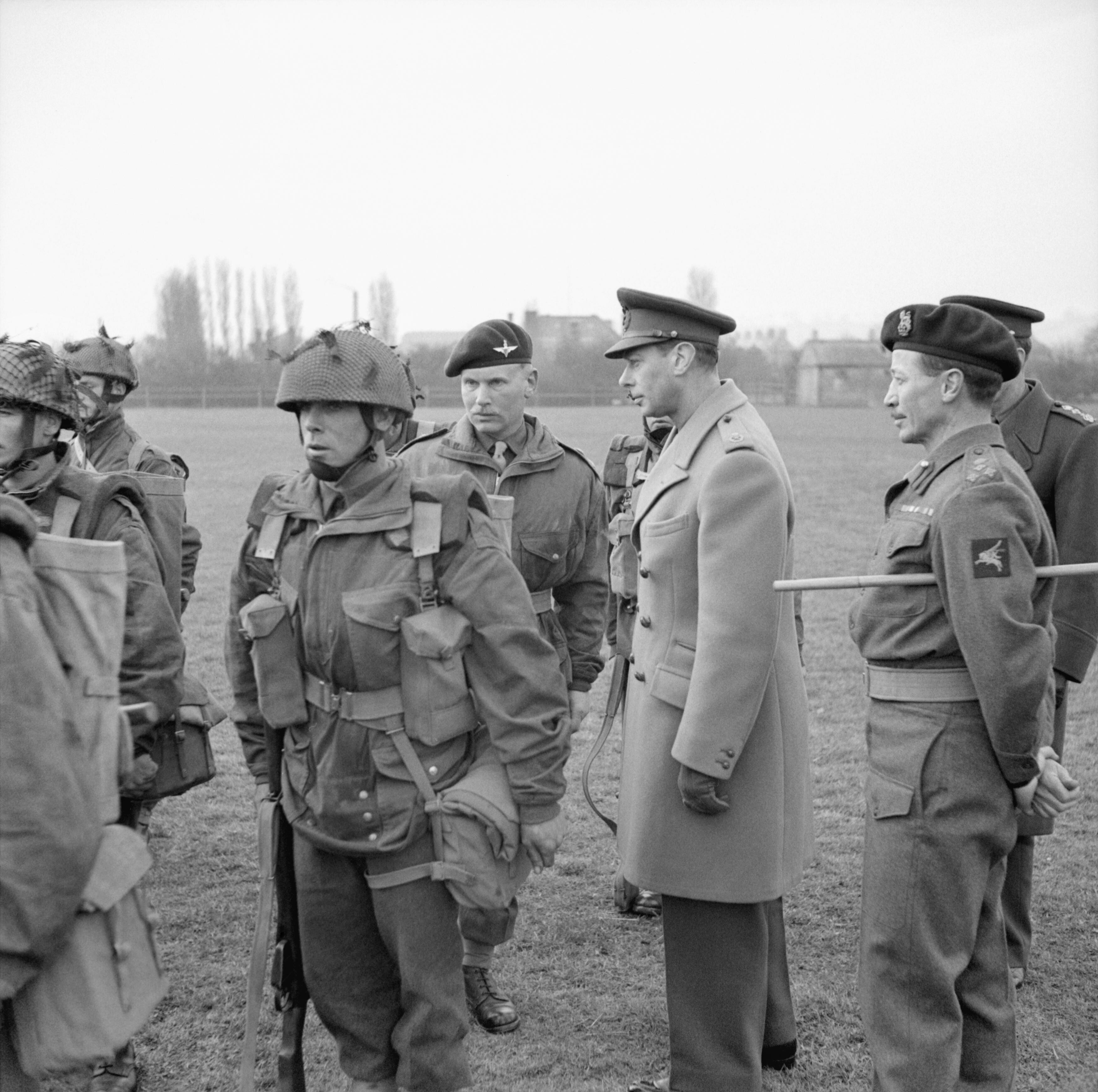
King George VI inspects paratroops of 1st Airborne Division, 16 March 1944. Standing just a bit behind the King, with swagger stick and maroon beret, is Brigadier "Shan" Hackett, commanding the 4th Parachute Brigade, while Lieutenant Colonel K. B. I. Smyth, commanding the 10th Parachute Battalion and in maroon beret, stands just in front of him.

Hackett fought in the British Army in the Second World War Syria-Lebanon campaign: he was wounded and was awarded the Military Cross. During his recovery in Palestine, he met Margaret Fena, the Austrian widow of a German. Despite the difficulties caused by her nationality, they married in Jerusalem in 1942.

In the North African campaign, he commanded 'C' Squadron of the 8th Hussars (his parent unit) and was wounded again when his M3 Stuart tank was hit during the battles for Sidi Rezegh airfield. He was severely burnt when escaping the stricken vehicle. Whilst recuperating at GHQ in Cairo, he was instrumental in the formation of the Long Range Desert Group, the Special Air Service and Popski's Private Army.

In 1944, Hackett raised and commanded the 4th Parachute Brigade for the Allied assault on Arnhem, in Operation Market Garden. At the battle of Arnhem, Brigadier Hackett was severely wounded in the abdomen by shrapnel from an overhead shellburst, then captured when taken to St. Elizabeth Hospital in Arnhem. A German doctor at the hospital told Hackett's British surgeon (Lipmann Kessel) that German practice was to administer a lethal injection of morphine, since such cases were thought hopeless. However, he was operated on by Alexander Lipmann-Kessel, who, with superb surgery, managed to save the brigadier's life.

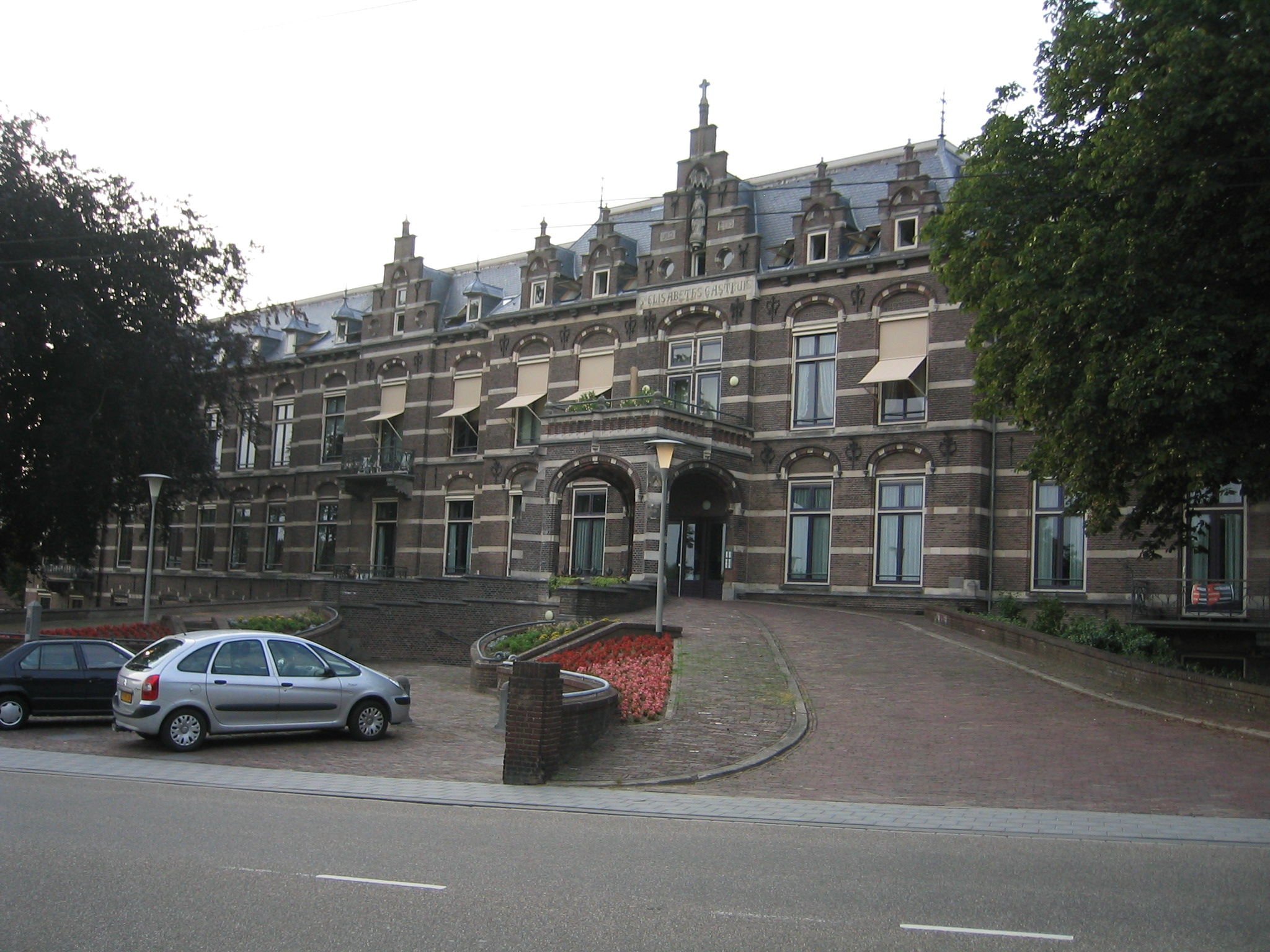
St Elizabeth Hospital

After a period of recuperation, he managed to escape with the help of the Dutch underground. Although he was unfit to be moved, the Germans were about to move him to a prisoner-of-war camp. He was taken by 'Piet van Arnhem', a resistance worker from Ede, and driven to Ede. Hackett had extra bloody bandages applied to heighten the severity of his injuries. After leaving the hospital, Arnhem told the checkpoint they were taking Hackett to hospital, and were let through despite the hospital being in the opposite direction from which they had just come.

Hackett was hidden by a Dutch family, called de Nooij, who lived at No. 5 Torenstraat in Ede. The family nursed the brigadier back to health over a period of several months; he then managed to escape to the Allied lines with the help of the underground. He remained friends with the de Nooijs for the rest of their lives and visited immediately after they were liberated, bearing gifts. Hackett wrote about the experience in his book I Was A Stranger, published in 1977. He received a bar to his Companion of the Distinguished Service Order insignia for his service at Arnhem.

== Later Army Career ==
He returned to Palestine during the Palestine Emergency in 1947 where he assumed command of the Transjordan Frontier Force. Under his direction, the force was disbanded, as part of the British withdrawal from the region. He attended university at Graz, as a postgraduate in post-mediaeval studies and, after returning to the United Kingdom, he attended the Staff College, Camberley in 1951. After this, he was appointed to command the 20th Armoured Brigade and, on being promoted to major-general, assumed command of the 7th Armoured Division. In 1958, he became Commandant of the Royal Military College of Science at Shrivenham, and was promoted to lieutenant-general in 1961. He became General Officer Commanding-in-Chief (GOC-in-C), Northern Ireland Command, in 1961 and was knighted (KCB) on 2 June 1962. In 1963, he was appointed to Ministry of Defence as Deputy Chief of the Imperial General Staff (DCIGS), responsible for forces organisation and weapon development and became the leading figure in the reorganisation of the Territorial Army (TA), which made him unpopular. He relinquished his appointment on 4 February 1966.

On 14 April 1966, he was appointed command of the British Army of the Rhine (BAOR) and the parallel command of NATO's Northern Army Group, and his ability to speak several languages made him a natural choice, as did his friendship with foreign soldiers such as Johann von Kielmansegg of the Bundeswehr.

In 1968 he wrote a highly controversial letter to The Times that was critical of the British government's apparent lack of concern over the strength of NATO forces in Europe but signed the letter as a NATO officer, not as a British commander.

== Retirement ==
After his retirement from the army, Hackett continued to be active in several areas. From 1968 to 1975, he was Principal of King's College, London. He was the president in 1971 of the Classical Association and in 1973 of the English Association. In 1978, he wrote a novel, The Third World War: August 1985, which was a fictionalized scenario of the Third World War based on a Red Army invasion of West Germany in 1985. It was followed in 1982 by The Third World War: The Untold Story, which elaborated on the original, including more detail from a Soviet perspective. American author Max Brooks cited Hackett's novels as one source of inspiration for his novel World War Z. Hackett also appeared in the documentary In Search of the Trojan War, where he described The Iliad as "a story about the sort of people I know."

== Decorations ==
Hackett's honours include being appointed a Knight Grand Cross of the Bath, Commander of the Most Excellent Order of the British Empire and Companion of the Distinguished Service Order with Bar, and being awarded the Military Cross. His obituary in The Times called him a man of "intellect and prodigious courage."

== Bibliography ==
Dates may not be reliable and are for guidance only.

- Popski's Private Army, 1950, ISBN 0-304-36143-7 (Foreword only)
- The Profession of Arms, 1963, ISBN 0-02-547120-1
- I Was A Stranger, 1977, ISBN 0-7011-2211-0
- The Third World War, 1978, ISBN 0-425-04477-7
- Third World War: Lecture, 1979 ISBN 0-85287-132-5
- Arnhem Doctor, 1981, ISBN 0-85613-324-8 (Foreword only)
- The Third World War: The Untold Story, 1982, ISBN 0-283-98863-0
- The Middle East Commandos, 1988, ISBN 0-7183-0645-7 (Foreword only)
- Warfare in the Ancient World, 1989, ISBN 0-283-99591-2
- The Desert Rats: History of the 7th Armoured Division, 1990, ISBN 1-85367-063-4 (Introduction only)
- The Devil's Birthday: Bridges to Arnhem, 1944, 1992, ISBN 0-85052-352-4
- The History of the Glider Pilot Regiment: An Official History, 1992, ISBN 0-85052-326-5
- One Night in June, 1994, 1853104922 (Introduction only)
- Map of the D-Day Landings, 1994, ISBN 0-7028-2668-5 (Foreword only)
- To Save A Life, 1995, ISBN 1-898094-10-1

== Honours and awards ==
Coat of arms of John Hackett

Notes
Confirmed by Sir Arthur Vicars, Ulster King of Arms, 30 July 1907.
Crest
On a wreath of the colours an eagle displayed with two heads per pale Azure and Gules between the heads a trefoil slipped Vert.
Escutcheon
Quarterly 1st & 4th Azure three hakes haurient fesswise Argent (Hackett 1508) 2nd & 3rd Gules three hakets Argent (Hackett 1639).
Motto
Mon Esperance Est En Dieu

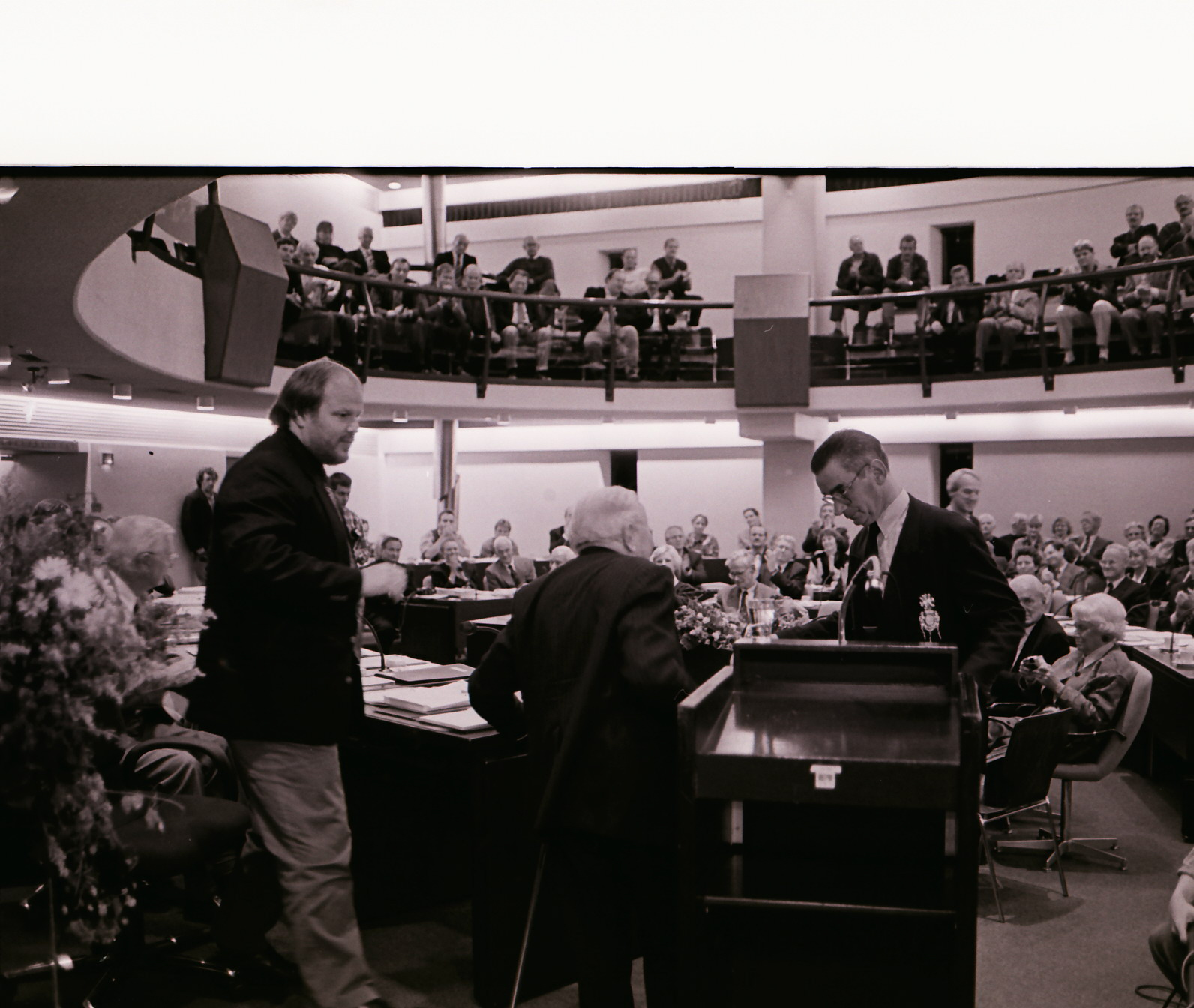
18 September 1994, John Hackett receives a medal of honour in Ede, the Netherlands

Knight Grand Cross of the Order of the Bath (GCB)	1967
Knight Commander of the Order of the Bath (KCB)	1962
Companion of the Order of the Bath (CB)	1958
Commander of the Order of the British Empire (CBE)	1953
Member of the Order of the British Empire (MBE)	1938
Companion of the Distinguished Service Order and Bar (DSO and Bar)	1942; Bar 1945
Military Cross (MC)	1941
General Service Medal	with palm for Mentioned in Despatches; Clasp 'Palestine'
1939–45 Star	
Africa Star	
Italy Star	
France and Germany Star	
Defence Medal	
War Medal 1939–1945	with palm for Mentioned in Despatches
Queen Elizabeth II Coronation Medal	1953

Hackett was also mentioned in despatches six times:

1) 1936 Palestine
2) 1937 "Trans-Jordan Frontier Force"
3) 1937 "Trans-Jordan Frontier Force"
4) 1944 Italy
5) 1945 Arnhem
6) 1949 Palestine

== Sources ==
- The Biography of General Sir John "Shan" Hackett GCB DSO MC, by Roy Fullick 2003, ISBN 0-85052-975-1

Military offices
Preceded by Kenneth Cooper	GOC 7th Armoured Division; 1956–1958	Succeeded by Geoffrey Musson
Preceded by Charles Richardson	Commandant of the Royal Military College of Science; 1958–1961	Succeeded by Robert Ewbank
Preceded by Douglas Packard	GOC British Army in Northern Ireland; 1961–1963	Succeeded by Richard Anderson
Preceded by Sir John Anderson	Deputy Chief of the Imperial General Staff; 1963–1966	Succeeded by Sir Charles Harington
Preceded by Sir William Stirling	C-in-C of the British Army of the Rhine; 1966–1968	Succeeded by Sir Desmond Fitzpatrick
Academic offices
Preceded by Sir Peter Noble	Principal of King's College, London; 1968–1975	Succeeded by Sir Richard Way
