= Victorious Boxers 2: Fighting Spirit =

2004 video game

- North American version cover art
- Developer: New Corporation
- Publishers: JP: Entertainment Software Publishing; WW: Empire Interactive
- Series: Hajime no Ippo
- Engine: RenderWare
- Platform: PlayStation 2
- Release: JP: December 22, 2004; EU: October 14, 2005; NA: November 20, 2006
- Genres: Sports, Fighting game
- Modes: Single-player, multiplayer

Victorious Boxers 2: Fighting Spirit is the North American sequel to Victorious Boxers: Ippo's Road to Glory. Its original Japanese title is Hajime no Ippo: All-Stars (はじめの一歩 ALL☆STARS). In Japan, it is actually the third game in the series to be released on the PlayStation 2. Because of this, it is sometimes confused with the actual second Japanese game, Hajime no Ippo 2: Victorious Road (はじめの一歩2 VICTORIOUS ROAD). Like its predecessor, it is based on the anime and manga series Hajime no Ippo.

The fights in the game mirrored the fights that took place in the manga series. The beginning of the game focuses on Ippo Makunouchi's rise up the Japanese Featherweight ranks, and includes the fights of Ippo's fellow gym mates. The storyline, which unfolds in the story mode, takes place in various linear segments in the game.

== Gameplay ==
The controls are very similar to its predecessor. There are both offensive and defensive types of moves. Defensive moves include dashing, bobbing, weaving and guarding. Offensive moves include standard boxing maneuvers like jabs, hooks, straights, and uppercuts.

The story mode is a single player mode that follows the boxing careers of the main characters from the manga/anime series. There are three different difficulty settings: easy, normal, or hard.

The exhibition mode is a multi player versus mode where players can compete against each other. Initially, only a small number of characters are available, but more characters become available by playing through the story mode. Players can adjust the number of rounds, knockdowns, and the style of the count for the match. Players can also adjust a character's level of power, speed, and stamina.

Player(s) can compete in tournament style gameplay with either 4, 8, or 16 fighters.

== Plot and setting ==
The story is based on the Japanese manga/anime series "はじめの一歩" (Hajime no Ippo), which was released in North America as Fighting Spirit. The game features over 70 boxers.

== Development ==
Victorious Boxers 2 was released in Japan in celebration of the manga series', Fighting Spirit, 15th anniversary.

== Reception ==
Reception

Aggregate score
Aggregator	Score
Metacritic	61/100

Review scores
Publication	Score
Eurogamer	7/10
Famitsu	28/40
Jeuxvideo.com	9/20
PALGN	6.5/10
The Times	2/5

Like the first Victorious Boxers, this game had a relatively unknown release. Though very similar to the first, it received "mixed" reviews according to the review aggregation website Metacritic. In Japan, Famitsu gave it a score of 28 out of 40.

PALGN said that the game was a "reasonable boxing title" that could have done better if released earlier. They also stated that fans of the anime and manga would enjoy it. Eurogamer said that while many gamers may prefer games like the Fight Night series over Victorious Boxers 2, "it's certainly an acquired taste that proves satisfying if you give it time to beef up".
