= Kōhei Kiyasu =

Japanese actor and voice actor

- 喜安 浩平
- Born: February 19, 1975 (age 51); Ehime Prefecture, Japan
- Education: Hiroshima University (BA)
- Occupations: Actor; scriptwriter
- Children: 1

Kōhei Kiyasu (喜安 浩平,, Kiyasu Kouhei; born February 19, 1975) is a Japanese actor, voice actor, and scriptwriter from Ehime Prefecture. He is a graduate of Hiroshima University, where he majored in art.

He is a member of the Nylon 100 °C theater troupe, as well as the chairman of his own troupe Bull Docking Headlock (ブルドッキングヘッドロック).

== Personal life ==
On December 3, 2017, Kiyasu announced his marriage and that his wife had given birth to a son.

== Selected filmography ==
- Ojamajo Doremi Dokka~n! (Shawn)
- Kaiketsu Zorori (Paru)
- Capeta (Nobu Andou)
- Captain Tsubasa: Holland Youth (Takeshi Sawada)
- Captain Tsubasa J (Adult Takeshi Sawada)
- Captain Tsubasa: Road to 2002 (Adult Takeshi Sawada)
- Fafner of the Azure (Soushi Minashiro)
- Dear Boys (Kazuhiko Aikawa)
- The Prince of Tennis (Kaoru Kaido, Hazue Kaido, Kyosuke Uchimura, Haginosuke Taki)
- Dragon Drive (Kouhei Toki)
- Noein (Isami Fujiwara)
- Hajime no Ippo (Ippo Makunouchi)
- Whistle! (Daichi Fuwa)
- Pocket Monster Advance Challenge (Brawly)
- Yu-Gi-Oh! Duel Monsters (Akira)
- Yomigaeru Sora - Rescue Wings (Hironori Suzuki)
- Mizuiro (OVA) (Kenji Katase)
- Hanada Shōnen Shi (Amanojaku)
- The Prince of Tennis II: U-17 World Cup (Maxwell)

== Video games ==
- Super Robot Wars UX (Soushi Minashiro)
- Victorious Boxers (Ippo Makunouchi)
- Genshin Impact (Azhdaha)
