= Slayers Royal =

1997 video game

- Sega Saturn cover art by Rui Araizumi
- Developer: Onion Egg (Note: Ported to PlayStation by Japan Art Media.)
- Publishers: Entertainment Software Publishing (Saturn); Kadokawa Shoten (PlayStation)
- Platforms: Sega Saturn, PlayStation
- Release: JP: July 25, 1997 (Saturn); JP: April 23, 1998 (PlayStation)
- Genre: Tactical role-playing
- Mode: Single-player

Slayers Royal (Note: Japanese: スレイヤーズろいやる, Hepburn: Sureiyāzu roiyaru) is a 1997 tactical role-playing game developed by Onion Egg and published by Kadokawa Shoten and Entertainment Software Publishing only in Japan. It was originally released for the Sega Saturn on July 25, 1997, and its PlayStation port by Japan Art Media was released on April 23, 1998. Slayers Royal was the third video game adaptation on the Slayers franchise and the first that featured the full motion video cut scenes and voice actors from the anime versions. This well-received game was followed by a non-sequel Slayers Royal 2 in 1998.

== Gameplay ==
Battle Mode on the Sega Saturn

Contrary to its two purely role-playing predecessors in the comedy fantasy franchise Slayers video game entries, Royal is a tactical RPG. The game is split between Adventure Mode and Battle Mode:

- Adventure Mode itself has two components, conversation and travel (including visiting in-town locations such as stores and inns as well as dungeons). There is also no free movement while exploring the dungeons and the progress instead depends on the player's story choices.
- Battle Mode features an isometric-view perspective similar to this used in Final Fantasy Tactics and is round-based for selecting orders (including a variety of spells and character-specific special moves), followed by their execution ending with a next turn. Each character in the player's party can be controlled either manually or automatically by AI. The fights can take place outdoors and indoors, and the most powerful offensive spells (such as the ultimate "Dragon Slave", capable of destroying large parts of scenery) can not be used in the latter.

Compared to the previous Slayers games, the use of CD-ROM as media enabled addition of FMV cutscenes and a large amount of digitized voice sampling, featuring the voices of Megumi Hayashibara, Maria Kawamura, Yasunori Matsumoto, Masami Suzuki, Hikaru Midorikawa and other main actors from Slayers anime productions. The PlayStation has some new features such as an improved FMV quality, five minigames (such as "Slayers Quiz"), and the DualShock controller vibration feedback compatibility.

== Plot ==
Slayers Royal is notable for bringing together Naga the Serpent (Lina Inverse's companion in the prequel stories) with Gourry Gabriev, Amelia Wil Tesla Seyruun and Zelgadis Greywords (Lina's companions in the main storyline) at once for the first time. In the game's storyline, Lina, Gourry and Naga encounter an elf boy named Lark (ラーク) being attacked by the mazoku demons. After rescuing him, they find that the mazoku have kidnapped Lark's sister in order to gain an ancient amulet that is now in hands of Lark. Eventually, they discover the real power of this legendary relic: with it, the mazoku can resurrect the demon king Ruby-Eye Shabranigdu and destroy the world.

== Reception ==
Slayers Royal was a commercial success in Japan, where the original Sega Saturn release became #2 best-selling game on any platform during August 1997. French magazine Consoles + gave a review score of 90% for the Saturn version, comparing it to Riglord Saga and Sakura Wars, and later also 87% for the PlayStation port. Dave Halverson from Gamers' Republic listed it among the untranslated Japanese games "that any Saturn user would have been proud to own."

== See also ==
- List of Slayers video games
