= Slayers Royal 2 =

1998 video game

- Sega Saturn cover art by Rui Araizumi
- Developer(s): Onion Egg
- Publisher(s): Entertainment Software Publishing; Kadokawa Shoten
- Platform(s): Sega Saturn; PlayStation
- Release: Sega Saturn: JP: 3 September 1998; PlayStation: JP: 1 July 1999
- Genre(s): Tactical role-playing
- Mode(s): Single-player

Slayers Royal 2 (スレイヤーズろいやる2) is a tactical role-playing game developed by Onion Egg and published by Entertainment Software Publishing and Kadokawa Shoten in 1998 for the Sega Saturn and in 1999 for the PlayStation, exclusively in Japan. It is a follow-up to 1997's Slayers Royal but is a standalone story in the Slayers franchise and not a direct sequel to its predecessor. The game sold well, but its reviews were mostly only moderately positive.

== Gameplay ==
Battle gameplay screenshot with Lina, Gourry and Naga

Slayers Royal 2 retains its predecessor's overall gameplay of a tactical role-playing game with exploration phases, but with some differences. Notable changes in comparison with the original Slayers Royal include a simplification of the town-navigation system (which no longer resembles adventure games), the introduction of day/night cycle, and the presence of freely explorable dungeons throughout the game. The combat system has undergone a radical overhaul since the previous game. Instead of the pseudo-real-time turn system, it is now purely turn-based. Its other novelties include a new magic system that demands an uninterrupted invocation before being cast, taking a time proportional to the spell's power, and a necessity to keep the player's party well-fed for them to perform best in battle.

== Plot ==
The plot of the game is mostly unrelated to Slayers Royal, with the exception of the appearance of the elf boy Lark. It also contains some elements from the film Slayers Gorgeous.

Lina Inverse and Gourry Gabriev travel to the remote countryside town of Dorutohaut after Lina receives a summons from that town's local sorcerer's guild. Once the two arrive, they speak with the local guild director who indicates that some bandits robbed the local church and stole a valuable amulet and that Lina apparently with the aid of a blonde swordsman and a long-haired sorceress defeated these bandits. Lina and Gourry encounter Naga the Serpent and it is made clear that Naga was the long haired sorceress Greg was talking about and that two individuals have been going around impersonating both Lina and Gourry. Arriving at the church, they are promised a rich reward if they can recover the amulet from the impostors. Lina and Gourry accept the job and set out to find Naga. In the midst of searching for the amulet, a mysterious person who calls herself Alicia attempts to halt the group's progress, stating that the amulet must not be found without giving an explanation as to why. Lina and Gourry, now accompanied by Naga eventually find the imposter Lina, but Naga turns on Lina and Gourry in order to claim the reward for herself. Eventually, Lina and Gourry manage to reclaim the amulet and by extension the reward.

At this point, the church's priest Robert explains the true value of this legendary amulet, stating that it is the key to opening the seal to five towers scattered throughout the land that were created long ago by the legendary sorcerer Rei Magnus. Robert then tasks Lina and Gourry to uncover whatever secrets these towers may hold. This task is made difficult though as Naga accompanied by the two imposters seeks to claim the treasure for herself and Alicia periodically appears to try to halt Lina's progress. Along the way, Lina and Gourry once again meet with Zelgadis, Amelia, Sylphiel and Lark from the first Slayers Royal game all in a quest to uncover the truth behind the five towers of Rei Magnus.

== Reception ==
Slayers Royal 2 was commercially successful, having remained on Japan's Sega Saturn top ten list five weeks after its release. However, the game received mediocre review ratings in Japan, including 25/40 from Famitsu and 18/30 from Sega Saturn Magazine.

In the West, French magazine Joypad scored the Saturn version a 7/10, while Spanish magazine Superjuegos opined that although Slayers Royal 2 "is not Vandal Hearts" it should please the fans of the series and noted the game's "spectacular" animation. The website RPGFan gave the Saturn version a score of 78%, praising its graphics and recommending it for the fans of the anime version.

== See also ==
- List of Slayers video games
