= Evolution Worlds =

2002 video game

- North American box art
- Developer: Sting Entertainment
- Publishers: JP: Entertainment Software Publishing; WW: Ubi Soft
- Platform: GameCube
- Release: JP: July 26, 2002; NA: December 2, 2002; PAL: March 7, 2003
- Genre: Role-playing
- Mode: Single-player

Evolution Worlds (known as Shinkisekai Evolutia (神機世界エヴォルシア) in Japan) is a role-playing video game developed by Sting Entertainment for the GameCube. It was first published in Japan in 2002 by Entertainment Software Publishing and later by Ubisoft in North America and Europe. The game was supposed to be released in North America on November 18, 2002, but was delayed by a few weeks. The game contains an abbreviated version of Evolution: The World of Sacred Device (1999) along with the full sequel Evolution 2: Far Off Promise (1999) on the same disc. Both games were originally released on the Sega Dreamcast.

== Plot ==
The game is set in the year of 930. An ancient civilization had met its demise one thousand years before. Special individuals are able to use Cyframes, ancient tools, which were excavated from the ruins of the ancient civilization. These individuals are known as Cyframe users or adventurers, and are assigned jobs from the Society, a research institute. The adventurers use their Cyframes to explore ruins. Some of the ruins have hieroglyphics that tell of a Cyframe called Evolutia that has tremendous power. Many search for the fabled Evolutia like the Launcher family and even the army.

== Major characters ==
- Mag Launcher: The only offspring of the renowned Launcher family, Mag lives in his parents' mansion west of Pannam Town. His dream is to become as famed and successful an adventurer as his father, Asroc, who was lost while adventuring and never returned. Now, Mag is the only one to lead the family; despite his talent and enthusiasm, the Launcher family has since spiraled into debt.
- Linear Cannon: She is always following Mag around on his adventures. Three years before the events of Evolution Worlds, she appeared at the Launcher home with a letter from Mag's father, which requested that Mag protect her. When she first arrived Linear was afraid of everything around her, when Mag gave her an Ocarina she slowly started to feel safer. Linear is habitually shy and silent, only occasionally daring to voice her thoughts, but she wields mysterious healing powers. It is later learned that she is Evolutia, the god of evolution. After defeating Eugene, and revealing her true form, she begins to speak, addressing Mag only, and in combat, or when examining objects. Her sentences are still short.
- Gre Nade: He is the Launcher family's butler. He watches over Mag and Linear with a stern eye, charged by Asroc Launcher with their safety. Gre is often strict, but skilled in all respects befitting a butler: he is good with money, a master chef, and in times of battle, an excellent shot with a rifle. Gre takes away no money when chosen for a dungeon.
- Pepper Box: She is a wild adult adventurer with a bazooka-like Cyframe attached to her hip. Pepper is a beautiful and flirtatious young blonde woman who seems to have much experience as an adventurer. Her Cyframe, once sufficiently upgraded, can become extremely powerful. Pepper takes almost half of the prize money when completing a dungeon with her. She wears a stylish blue ensemble.
- Chain Gun: A young girl whose family has always been rivals with the Launchers. Chain is brash and a little conceited, but she is always willing to help Mag on a trip into the ruins (in no small part because of her secret infatuation with him). The Guns had wanted a male heir to carry on their legacy, and when Chain was born, her parents raised her as something of a tomboy. Chain takes a small portion of the prize money when completing a dungeon with her.
- Carcano: A mysterious but honorable bandit who raids the train Mag and friends are on to Museville. Mag later finds his hideout at Pine Village and defeats him. Near the end of the adventure, impressed with the young Launcher's strength and devotion, he joins Mag to defeat Yurka. Carcano can steal items from enemies, and he wields a devastating and versatile Cyframe that is fashioned after a drill.
- Eugene: Refined and intelligent, Eugene holds unsurpassed military clout as the head of the 8th Imperial Army. He stations his troops in Pannam Town while searching for Evolutia, in hopes of harnessing its power as a source of unlimited energy. Disturbingly enamored with Linear, he eventually captures her, forcing Mag to confront and defeat him.
- Yurka: The evolution of Destruction, he may also be Linear's brother. After visiting her a few times at hotel he convinces Linear to leave Mag under the presumption that if she stays with Mag he will be in danger. He later combines Linear's power and his own to power a machine called Ulticannon. Linear is brought out of a trance that Yurka put her in by Mag when he plays the Ocarina he gave her. When Linear leaves his jealousy and anger transforms the Ulticannon to a much darker form but is defeated by Mag and his friends.

== Re-release ==
Evolution Worlds has several changes in its re-release of Evolution and Evolution 2. The first Evolution has no spoken dialogue, and the sequel has a Japanese voice track. Evolution Worlds uses newly recorded English voice acting for both games.

The Linear Watch was removed, due to lack of Dreamcast's portable memory cartridge, Visual Memory Unit. Due to limited disc space, the first part (re-release of Evolution) is highly trimmed down, eliminating almost all of its dungeon crawling and condensing the game's entire plot into fewer, but much longer, cutscenes.

== Reception ==
Reception

Aggregate score
Aggregator	Score
Metacritic	63 / 100

Review scores
Publication	Score
Electronic Gaming Monthly	4 / 10
Famitsu	28 / 40
Game Informer	7 / 10
GameRevolution	C+
GameSpot	6.5 / 10
GameSpy	2/5
GameZone	8.3 / 10
IGN	5 / 10
Nintendo Power	4.3 / 5
Nintendo World Report	6 / 10
X-Play	3/5

The game received "mixed" reviews according to video game review aggregator Metacritic. Some magazines gave the game favorable reviews while it was still in development. In Japan, Famitsu gave it a score of 28 out of 40. GamePro said that the game was "no evolutionary step in the world of RPGs, but it's solid fare for average GameCubers seeking turn-based adventure." (Note: GamePro gave the game two 4/5 scores for graphics and fun factor, and two 3.5/5 scores for sound and control.)
