= Evolution: The World of Sacred Device =

1999 video game

- North American Dreamcast cover art
- Developers: Sting (DC); SNK (NGPC)
- Publishers: JP: Sega Entertainment Software Publishing (DC); WW: Ubi Soft (DC); WW: SNK (NGPC)
- Designer: DANDY DAN
- Composer: Masaharu Iwata
- Platforms: Dreamcast, Neo Geo Pocket Color
- Release: Dreamcast; JP: January 21, 1999; NA: December 16, 1999; EU: June 9, 2000; Neo Geo Pocket Color; JP: February 10, 2000; EU: 2000
- Genre: Role-playing
- Mode: Single-player

Evolution: The World of Sacred Device (Note: Known as Shinkisekai Evolution (神機世界Evolution(エヴォリューション), Shinkisekai Evoryūshon) in Japan) is a role-playing video game for the Dreamcast and Neo Geo Pocket Color (developed and published by SNK under the name Evolution: Eternal Dungeons (Note: Known in Japan as Shinkisekai Evolution: Hateshinai Dungeon (神機世界エヴォリューション 〜はてしないダンジョン〜, Shinkisekai Evoryūshon 〜Hateshinai Danjon〜))). It was developed by Sting and published by Sega and Entertainment Software Publishing in Japan and Ubi Soft in North America and Europe.

Evolution is a roguelike dungeon crawling game that follows the adventures of Mag Launcher. Mag Launcher and his companions use Cyframes, technology discovered in ancient ruins. These Cyframes are sought after by adventurers who explore caverns to find them.

This game and its sequel, Evolution 2: Far Off Promise, were compacted into Evolution Worlds on the GameCube.

== Gameplay ==
As typical for roguelikes, the goal in Evolution is to guide an adventuring party through a series of dungeons by advancing through their procedurally generated floors and defeating the boss at the end of each one. The dungeons may be completed in any order, with the exception of the last one, and have an increasing number of floors as the player progresses. For example, if the player enters a certain dungeon first, it will have 9 floors, but if they enter it as the penultimate dungeon, it will have 21 floors, there will be more powerful enemies on floors 10 through 20, and the boss will have higher stats.

Apart from the boss floors, each dungeon floor is populated by roaming enemies, traps, and treasure chests with items inside. Traps all take the form of hidden floor panels which cause one of a variety of effects on the party if stepped on. Some traps have positive effects, such as restoring hit points or weakening the floor's enemies. A skilled player can spot traps by a faint outline on the floor panel or by using a special item which marks the type and location of all a floor's traps.

Combat in Evolution occurs whenever the character touches an enemy. If the character touches an enemy from behind, the party seizes the initiative, and the enemies' actions are delayed. If an enemy touches the character from behind, the party members' actions are delayed, and their formation is reversed. The battle system is turn-based, with each individual combatant having their own turn. Each turn, the character has the options of performing a simple melee attack, using an item, defending against attacks, moving to change their position in the party's formation, running from battle (possible only if all three party members are in the back row), and using a skill. Each character has their own set of skills which are completely unique to that character, require the character to spend a set amount of skill points (magic points under a different terminology) each time they are used, and perform a wide variety of functions such as direct damage, healing, stat buffs, stat decreases, and status ailments. Skills cannot be used outside of combat. Performing any action other than using a skill, moving, and running causes the character to replenish a small number of skill points.

Upon winning a battle, all of the still conscious party members are awarded experience points (which accumulate to raise the character's level, substantially increasing the character's stats) and TP, which can be spent to make the character learn new skills. The player can select an unlearned skill during combat, in which case the character will spend the required TP to learn the skill and immediately perform that skill without spending any skill points. Learning a skill outside of combat provides no such immediate benefit, but may be a desirable option if the player needs to learn a skill to open up the skill tree further but does not want to actually use that skill in combat.

After completing a dungeon, the party is automatically returned to Pannam Town, where their hit points and skill points are fully replenished and they are given reward money for retrieving the artifact at the end of the dungeon. The player can then wander through Pannam Town, where they may sell minor artifacts, upgrade the characters' Cyframes, buy and sell items, talk to acquaintances, and move items into and out of Mag's storage chest until they are ready to enter the next dungeon.

== Story ==
Evolution is set in a post-apocalyptic future, in the ramshackle Pannam Town in the Northrup Republic. Professional adventurers are valued members of society because they excavate artifacts of pre-apocalyptic civilization, which had much more advanced technology than present-day society. Most valued of these artifacts are Cyframes, which are powerful tools/weapons for individual use. Mag Launcher is the adolescent head of the renowned Launcher family of adventurers, but the clan has fallen on hard times: Mag's father Asroc disappeared while searching for a legendary Cyframe called Evolutia, and left the family deep in debt. The mansion is occupied only by Mag, the faithful Launcher butler Gre Nade, and Linear Cannon, a mute girl Mag's age who appeared at his doorstep three years before with a letter from Asroc directing Mag to protect her. She joins Mag in his adventures, and the two are inseparable companions and a rumored romantic couple. She tends the Launcher garden with a mysterious power which allows her to revive dead plants.

The 8th Imperial Army comes to Pannam Town to excavate one of the nearby ruins. The head of the army, Prince Eugene Leopold, summons Mag and asks him about Evolutia. After Mag says his father told him nothing of it, Eugene dismisses them. The 8th Imperial Army's equipment picks up strong energy manifestations confirming that Evolutia is in Pannam Town, so Eugene visits the Launcher mansion to question them further. When Mag mentions that Linear came to them three years ago, Eugene concludes that Linear is in fact Evolutia, an artificial life form with power over life and death. He rallies the army to attack the Launcher mansion and kidnap Linear.

Mag follows Eugene to his battleship to rescue Linear. While battling the soldiers, he unintentionally knocks a grenade into the ship's engine, causing the ship to begin breaking apart. Eugene voices his belief that Linear is Evolutia, that whoever commands her power is effectively immortal, and that if Mag does not surrender Linear to him then every government and corporation in the world will come after her in order to obtain her power. Mag does not believe him. He destroys Eugene's battlesuit and frees Linear. When Mag and Linear find a lifeboat to flee the exploding ship, Eugene shoots Mag in the back and threatens to shoot Linear if she does not come with him. With the last of his strength, Mag uses his Cyframe to knock Eugene overboard, then collapses dead. Linear uses her power to revive Mag and sprouts wings and talons to carry him away from the battleship, revealing that she is, indeed, Evolutia. In the midst of this manifestation, Linear speaks for the first time, and she and Mag embrace. Eugene and his army stare in awe.

== Reception ==
Reception

Aggregate score
Aggregator	Score
GameRankings	67%

Review scores
Publication	Score
AllGame	2/5
CNET Gamecenter	8/10
Electronic Gaming Monthly	5.25/10 (Note: In Electronic Gaming Monthly's review of the game, one critic gave it 6.5/10, two others gave it each a score of 5/10, and another gave it 4.5/10.)
Famitsu	(DC) 32/40 (NGPC) 27/40
Game Informer	7/10
GameFan	(E.M.) 90% 86% (Note: In GameFan's viewpoint of the game, three critics gave it each a score of 90, 83, and 86.)
GameRevolution	C+
GameSpot	7.1/10
GameSpy	6/10
IGN	6.5/10
Next Generation	3/5
RPGFan	70%

Evolution: The World of Sacred Device received average reviews according to the review aggregation website GameRankings. Jeff Lundrigan of NextGen said, "A case of style with just enough substance to back it up, Evolution is a charmer despite a few unimpressive edges." In Japan, Famitsu gave it a score of 32 out of 40 for Sacred Device, and 27 out of 40 for Eternal Dungeons.

The Enforcer of GamePro said of the game, "While ESP/Sting (the developer) has done a nice job on its first Dreamcast RPG, Evolution is really geared toward younger gamers and won't satisfy the hardcore gamer who's used to epic adventures of Final Fantasy VIII proportions. If you're a fan of the genre, you'll want to check it out – if for no other reason than to salivate over the possibilities of what a kick-ass RPG could be like on the Dreamcast." (Note: GamePro gave the game 4/5 for graphics, 2.5/5 for sound, 4.5/5 for control, and 3.5/5 for fun factor.)
