= Entertainment Software Publishing =

Japanese video game publisher

Entertainment Software Publishing, Inc.
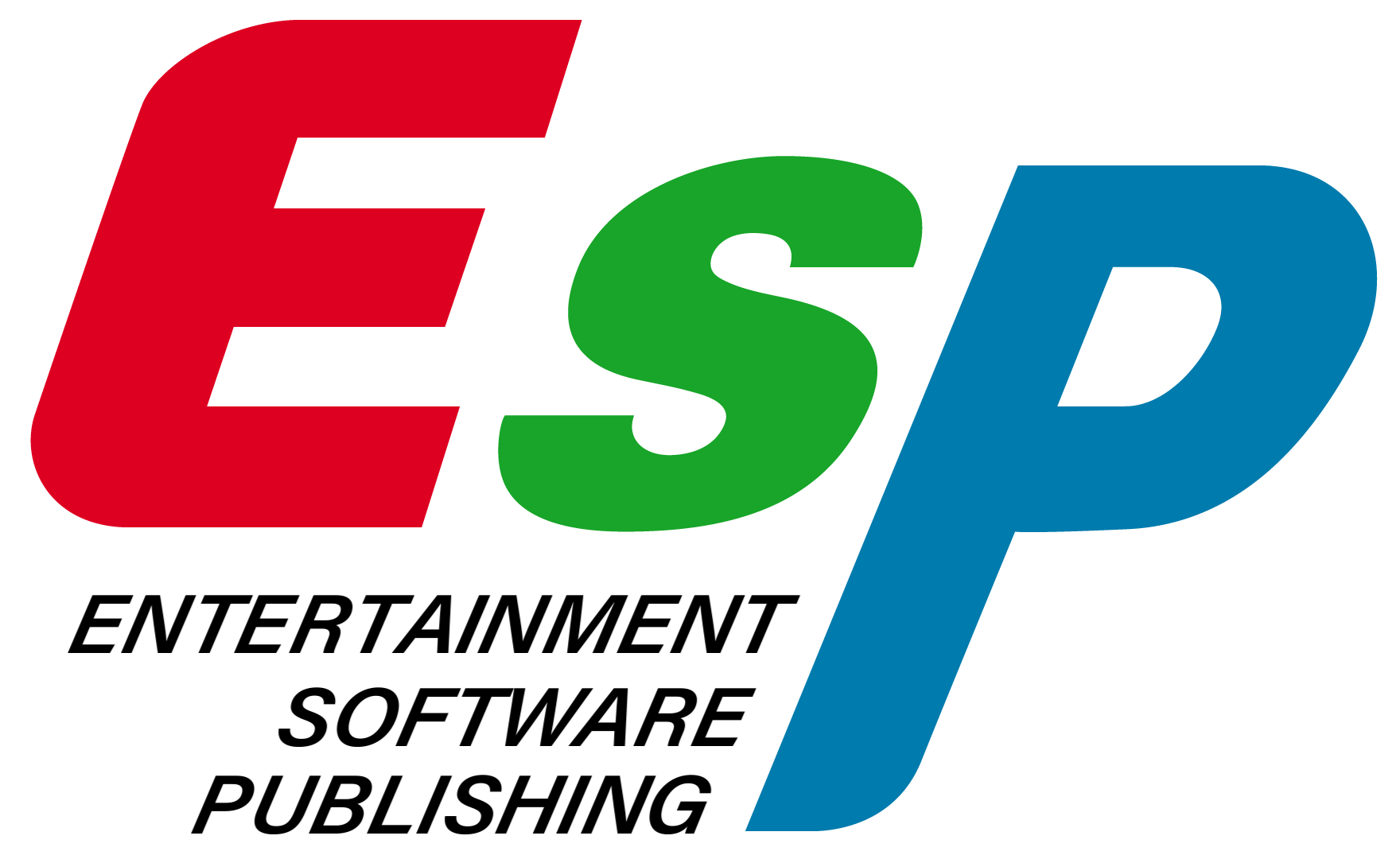

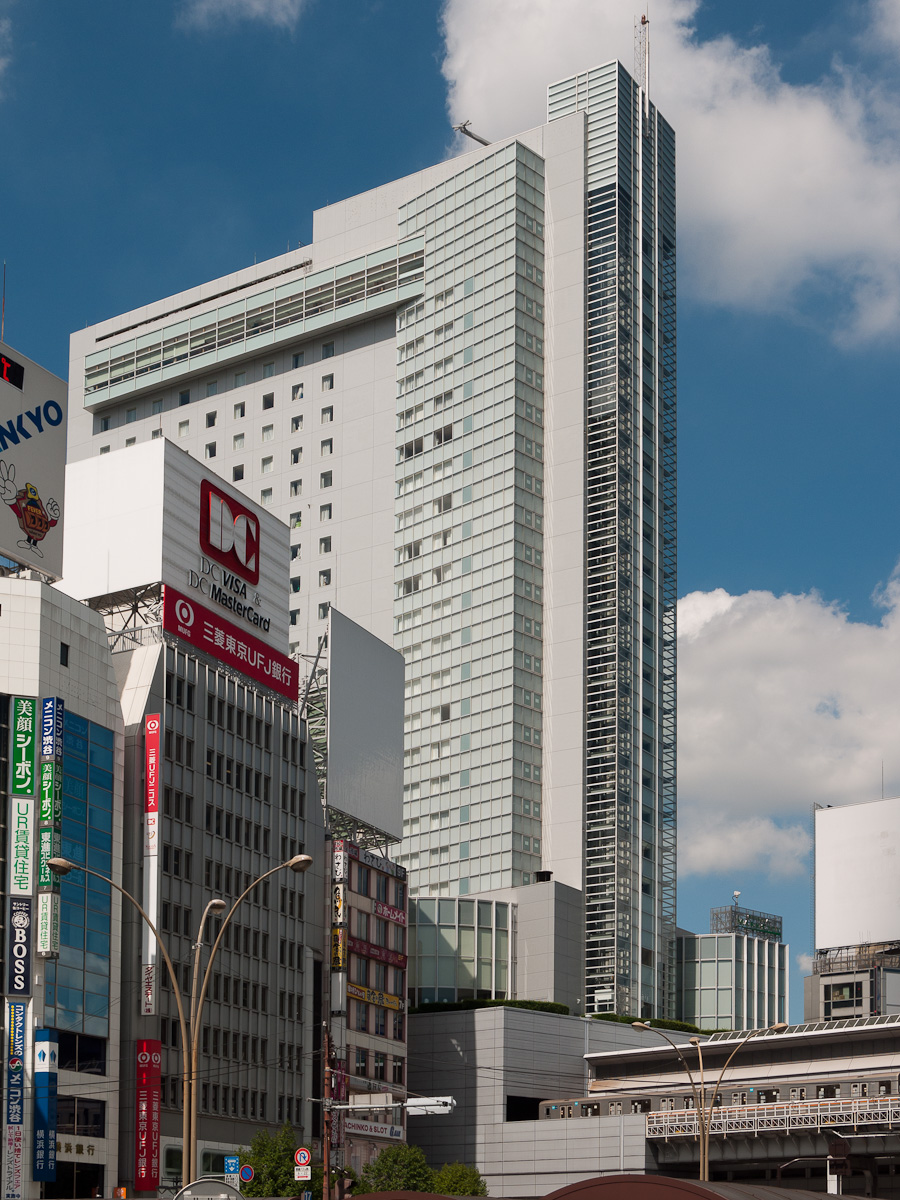
- ESP's former headquarters in Shibuya, Tokyo
- Native name: 株式会社エンターテインメント ソフトウェア パブリッシング
- Romanized name: Kabushiki-gaisha Entāteinmento Sofutō~ea Paburisshingu
- Type: Subsidiary
- Industry: Video games
- Founded: November 1997; 29 years ago
- Defunct: 1 April 2010; 16 years ago
- Fate: Merged with D3 Publisher
- Headquarters: Shibuya, Tokyo, Japan
- Key people: Youichi Miyaji (president)
- Products: Bangai-O series; Grandia; Ikaruga; Radiant Silvergun
- Parent: Game Arts (2002–2004); D3 Publisher (2004–2010)
- Website: esp-web.co.jp (archived)

Entertainment Software Publishing, Inc. (Note: Japanese: 株式会社エンターテインメント ソフトウェア パブリッシング, Hepburn: Kabushiki gaisha Entāteinmento Sofutō~ea Paburisshingu) (ESP) was a Japanese video game publisher headquartered in Shibuya, Tokyo. It was founded in 1997 as a publisher for games developed by the Game Developers Network (GD-NET). GD-NET, which included companies such as Treasure and Game Arts, was established due to concerns over smaller developers not having the same financial backing like larger game companies did, as production of console games was beginning to rise. ESP was best known for publishing shoot 'em ups and role-playing games. While primarily a publisher, ESP also developed a handful of games internally.

ESP primarily published games for the Sega Saturn and Dreamcast. When both systems met their demise, the company started shifting operations towards consoles such as the PlayStation 2, PlayStation Portable, and Nintendo DS. ESP was purchased by Game Arts in 2002 and became its publishing division. In 2004, ESP was sold to D3 Publisher, which had noticed ESP's track record and lineup of well-received titles. ESP was merged with D3 Publisher and its parent company, D3 Inc., in 2010.

Many games that were published by ESP, including Grandia, Radiant Silvergun, and the Bangai-O series, have received praise from critics. Several have sold well and have been ranked among the best in their genres. In the past, ESP helped co-publish several Japanese massively multiplayer online video games, and also collaborated with other game companies on various projects.

== History ==
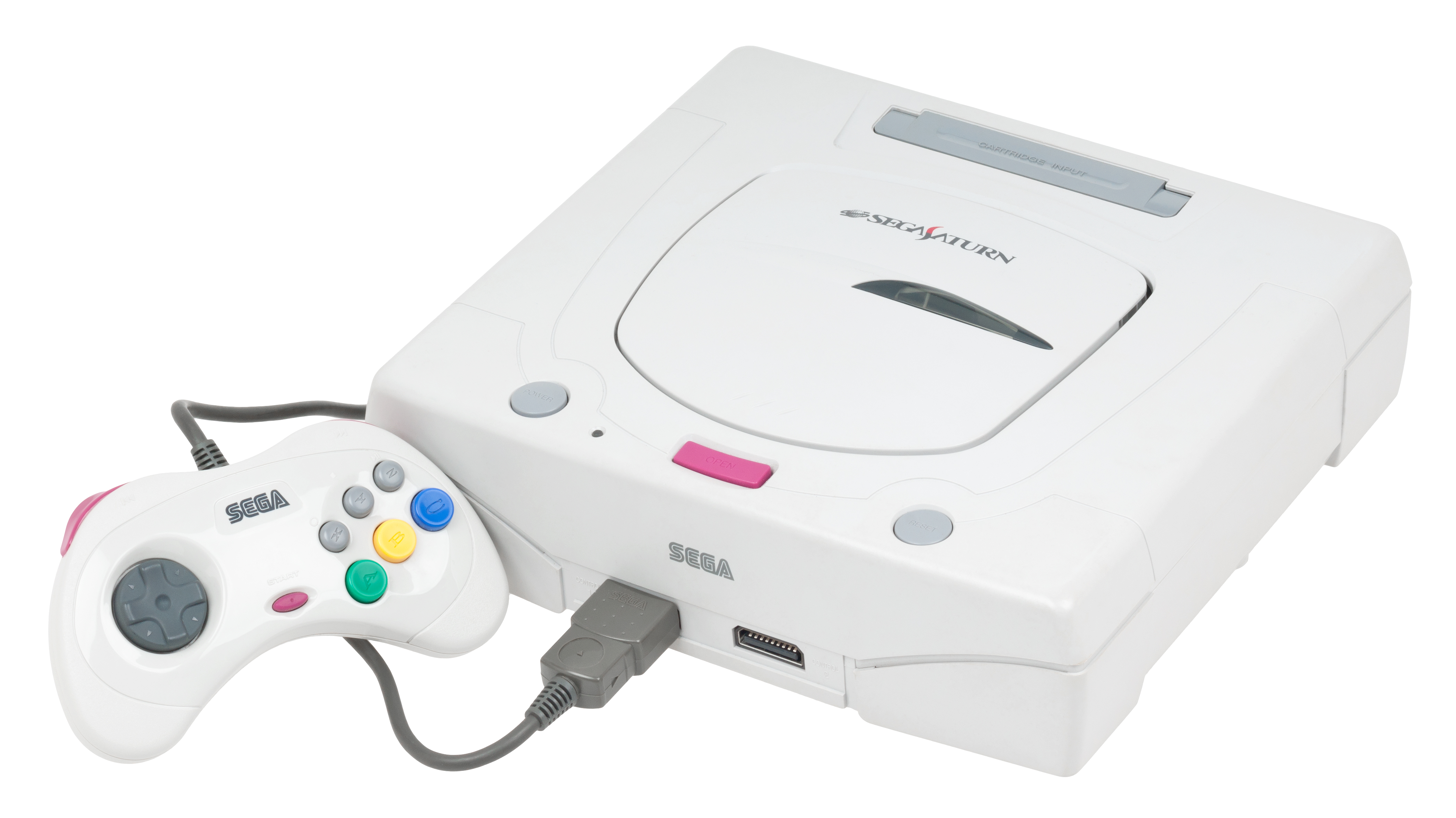
ESP was established to publish games by smaller developers for consoles such as the Sega Saturn (pictured above).

In the late 1990s in Japan, several Japanese video game developers, including Treasure, Quintet, Sting Entertainment, and Game Arts, joined forces and established Game Developers Network (GD-NET). The purpose of GD-NET was to establish mutual assistance with one another. As the video game market in Japan began growing in size, the costs for developers to produce games for consoles was also rising. Members of GD-NET did not have the same financial backing like larger companies did, and believed that creating healthy relationships between them would increase their chances of surviving the industry landscape of the time. Companies under the network proposed a plan that would allow them to focus their resources on game development instead of production and promotion of their titles.

GD-NET members established Entertainment Software Publishing (ESP) in November 1997. Youichi Miyaji, the president and CEO of Game Arts, was appointed president of the company. ESP was funded by many game studios, including Japan Art Media, CSK Research Institute, and Onion Soft, as well as most of the companies that were part of GD-NET. Additional funding was provided by CSK Holdings, the parent company of Sega. GD-NET members would create and produce games, while ESP would handle marketing, sales, and promotion of these games. GD-NET members believed that ESP would allow them to gain more recognition within the industry, as companies such as Sega, Nintendo, and Sony Computer Entertainment would have taken credit for their works when they were published.

One of ESP's first hits was Grandia for the PlayStation and Sega Saturn. Developed by Game Arts, Grandia was released in 1997 to critical acclaim. Treasure's Saturn conversion of the arcade game Radiant Silvergun was also released to acclaim for its gameplay and mechanics, and is cited among the best and most influential shoot'em up games created. Slayers Royal and its follow-up Slayers Royal 2, both based on the Slayers light novel and anime series, were also commercially successful.

In 1998, Sega discontinued production of the Sega Saturn in Europe and North America amidst poor sales. While the Saturn was still being sold in Japan, Sega largely abandoned the system in favor of the Dreamcast, which it released the same year. As such, ESP began to shift its publishing operations from Saturn to Dreamcast and other consoles like the Nintendo 64. It published Bangai-O for the latter console in 1999, which while critically successful was produced in limited quantities out of concern over its niche appeal. ESP commonly participated in the Tokyo Game Show and other major video game events in the country, where they regularly presented their more popular titles such as Silhouette Mirage. ESP also began publishing games for the PlayStation 2, which had become the best-selling video game console in Japan and outsold the Dreamcast by a wide margin.

In 2002, ESP was acquired by Game Arts and became the latter's publishing division. In 2004, ESP was purchased by D3 Publisher, a Japanese video game studio best known for its Simple series of budget games. D3 purchased 100% of ESP's stock for a total of 120 million yen. ESP's track record and lineup of commercially successful games was the reason for the acquisition. In addition to publishing other developer's titles for systems like the PlayStation 2 and Nintendo DS, ESP also began developing its own games such as Hajime no Ippo Portable Victorious Spirits for the PlayStation Portable. ESP co-published several Japanese massively multiplayer online games as well. It announced at the 2005 Tokyo Game Show it would also begin production of games for the PlayStation 3. In 2008, the company partnered with Treasure, the only remaining GD-NET company to still have working relations with them, to form a publishing project known as "Treasure × ESP". The project lead to ESP publishing Bangai-O Spirits for the DS, a critically successful sequel to Bangai-O.

On 1 April 2010, ESP and D3 Publisher were merged into the latter's parent holding company, D3 Inc., wherein both ESP and D3 Publisher were dissolved, while D3 Inc. was renamed D3 Publisher. The year prior, D3 Inc. had been majority-acquired by Namco Bandai Games.

== Games published ==
Year	Title	Platform(s)	Developer(s)	Ref.
1997	Slayers Royal	Sega Saturn; PlayStation	Onion Egg; Japan Art Media	
1997	Silhouette Mirage	Sega Saturn; PlayStation	Treasure	
1997	Mahō Gakuen Lunar!	Sega Saturn	Game Arts; Studio Alex	
1997	Grandia	Sega Saturn; PlayStation	Game Arts	
1998	Gungriffon II	Sega Saturn	Game Arts	
1998	Lunar: Silver Star Story Complete	PlayStation	Game Arts; Japan Art Media	
1998	Code R	Sega Saturn	Quintet	
1998	Radiant Silvergun	Sega Saturn	Treasure	
1998	Slayers Royal 2	Sega Saturn; PlayStation	Onion Egg	
1998	Baroque	PlayStation; Sega Saturn	Sting	
1998	Chaos Seed	Sega Saturn	Neverland	
1999	Evolution: The World of Sacred Device	Dreamcast	Sting	
1999	Bangai-O	Nintendo 64	Treasure	
1999	Evolution 2: Far Off Promise	Dreamcast	Sting	
2000	Aquarian Age: Tokyo Wars	PlayStation	Broccoli	
2000	Victorious Boxers: Ippo's Road to Glory	PlayStation 2	New Corporation	
2001	Abarenbō Princess	PlayStation 2	Alfa System	
2002	Evolution Worlds	GameCube	Sting	
2002	Ikaruga	Dreamcast	Treasure	
2004	Crouching Tiger, Hidden Dragon	PlayStation 2 Xbox	Bergsala Lightweight; Genki	
2004	Victorious Boxers 2: Fighting Spirit	PlayStation 2	New Corporation	
2005	Azumi	PlayStation 2	New Corporation	
2007	Garouden Breakblow: Fist or Twist	PlayStation 2	Opus	
2008	Bangai-O Spirits	Nintendo DS	Treasure	
