= Victorious Boxers: Ippo's Road to Glory =

2000 video game

- North American version cover art
- Developer: New Corporation
- Publishers: JP: Entertainment Software Publishing; WW: Empire Interactive
- Director: Ryuta Aoyagi
- Designer: Ryuta Aoyagi
- Programmer: Kazuya Furukawa
- Composers: Takayuki Aihara; Shinji Hosoe; Naoki Tsuchiya
- Series: Hajime no Ippo
- Platform: PlayStation 2
- Release: Original version: JP: December 14, 2000; EU: September 21, 2001; NA: November 5, 2001; Championship Version: JP: June 27, 2002 (PlayStation 2 the Best)
- Genre: Fighting
- Modes: Single-player, multiplayer

Victorious Boxers: Ippo's Road to Glory, (Note: Japanese: はじめの一歩 VICTORIOUS BOXERS, Hepburn: Hajime no Ippo: Victorious Boxers; lit. 'The First Step: Victorious Boxers') known as simply Victorious Boxers, is a boxing video game developed by New Corporation for the PlayStation 2 video game console. It is based on the Hajime no Ippo franchise. The game was released in Japan by Entertainment Software Publishing in December 2000 and in North America and Europe by Empire Interactive in 2001.

The game features a mix of simulation and arcade style boxing. The storyline, which unfolds in the story mode, takes place in six linear segments that originally overlapped in the manga. The game's fights mirrored the fights from the manga series. The beginning of the game focuses on Ippo Makunouchi's rise to the Japanese Featherweight championship, and later switches to Ippo's fellow gym mates' careers.

Victorious Boxers received "generally favorable reviews", with the visual style being poorly received, but its accuracy to boxing being praised. It was commercially successful in Japan, but did poorly in North America.

== Gameplay ==
Players control character movement, such as walking and ducking, with the left analog stick whereas attacks are controlled with buttons. Shown is the protagonist, Ippo Makunouchi, ducking under a hook thrown by Ponchai Chuwatana

Victorious Boxers's gameplay is a mix between simulation and arcade style boxing. It features 3D character models fighting within a boxing ring. The game keeps track of the fight records and saves it to the memory card via an auto-save option. Matches can also be saved to the memory card as "replay data" and be rewatched later. The gameplay during matches can be viewed from eighteen camera angles, including a first person view from either character, a TV camera angle, and overhead views from various angles.

Characters can dash, bob, and weave in eight directions. Control over punches is divided into left and right jabs/hooks. When punches are used in conjunction with "technique" and "special" buttons, additional types of punches are executed. Players can counterpunch opponents and string attacks into a combination. By combining upper body movements with punches, players can duck down and hit to the body or lean back and throw a quick punch to the head. The initial setup uses the left analog stick for all the character's bodily movements; minor movements to the stick control the upper body movements, while larger movements control the lower body and movement within the ring.

Victorious Boxers does not use a damage or life meter. Instead, visible damage can be seen on a boxer's face, which is most noticeable between rounds when the characters are sitting in their corners. The amount of damage taken is reflected by bruises, swelling, and black eyes on the characters' faces. Another sign of damage is the characters' speed of movement throughout the fight; stamina is directly affected by the number of hits received and the amount of special moves used. Characters begin to slow down and the controls become less responsive to simulate fatigue. Distance is a factor in determining a punch's damage. For example, a jab thrown while next to an opponent will not do as much damage as it would at arm's length. Also, right hooks do not do as much damage if the character is positioned to the opponent's left and vice versa.

=== Modes ===
The selection screen of the versus mode allows players to choose which boxer to control (Masaru Aoki is selected on the left and Katsutaka Imae on the right). As characters are defeated in the story mode, they are available to play in the versus mode.

The game has two modes: a single player story mode and a multi-player versus mode. The story mode follows the boxing careers of the main characters from the original series. All characters available to the player are from the Kamogawa Boxing Gym. Cut scenes occur before and after matches as the main story telling device. The game has six story arcs and begins with Makunouchi Ippo, the protagonist from the manga series. Story mode also unlocks more options in the versus mode as a player progresses through the story. Once a character has been played or a special technique learned, they become available in the versus mode. Likewise, once an opponent has been beaten, they are playable in the versus mode.

The versus mode is a free fighting mode where multiple players can box. The number of players can range from 0–2; both fighters can be controlled by either the computer or by a player. Initially there are only two playable characters; additional characters become accessible by playing through the story mode. Although the characters are grouped by their boxing weight class, any character can be selected to fight another regardless of weight class. Players can choose from ten locations for the bout. Initially, the only available arena is the Kamogawa Boxing Gym basement. New locations become available once a fight occurs there in the story mode.

== Plot ==
=== Setting and boxers ===
Victorious Boxers is set in Tokyo, Japan. The story unfolds via cut scenes set in either the Kamogawa Boxing Gym, the fictional boxing gym of the main characters, or the waiting rooms of the boxing arenas. The gameplay takes place in boxing arenas, some of which are based on locations in Japan and include Korakuen Hall, Ryogoku Sports Arena, and the Osaka Prefectural Gymnasium. Other locations include the mountainous area around Niigata, and an outdoor boxing ring set in post-World War II Tokyo, Japan.

The game features forty-four playable boxers—forty-two boxers and two duplicate characters that have handicapped abilities. The protagonist is Ippo Makunouchi, but the story shifts to his friends and fellow contenders as well. The game features most of the boxer up to the 53rd volume of the manga, including Ryuichi Hayami, Ryo Mashiba, Vorg Zangief, Kazuki Sanada, and Ryuhei Sawamura. Excluded are, Itagaki Manabu, Makino Fumito, Hama Dankichi, and Rally Bernard. The different boxers span five different weight classes; most boxers have a special move derived from the manga series.

The two duplicate characters are Ippo and Mamoru Takamura. The two characters are weaker than their normal versions and are embodiments of parts of the original story. The weaker Ippo is the first version of the character available. He wears sweats and a T-shirt rather than the boxing trunks the other characters wear. This version is based on when Ippo began boxing and was training to fight his rival, Ichiro Miyata. The weaker Takamura has less muscle mass and looks ill. He is based on a fight in the manga when Takamura overdid his weight management.

=== Story ===
The game begins with a sparring match with Ichiro Miyata, which is actually a rematch from a previous sparring match with Miyata that took place in the manga series. After winning, Ippo take his professional boxer exam to begin his boxing career. He then enters the East Japan Rookie Champion Tournament, and after succeeding, he faces the West Japan Rookie Champ, Takeshi Sendo. Ippo later enters the Class A tournament where he wins his chance to challenge the Japanese Featherweight Champion, Eiji Date. After losing to Eiji Date, Ippo climbs the ranks again to the featherweight championship, where he faces Sendo, who has become the new champion. After becoming the champion, Ippo then defends the title five times.

The story then shifts to one of Ippo's senpai, Masaru Aoki, who has been boxing for a number of years before Ippo. He enters the Class A Tournament, but loses. Afterward, he begins his comeback and rises through the Lightweight division to win the Lightweight Championship against Katsutaka Imae. Aoki's story differs from the manga in that Aoki lost several of the fights, and achieved a draw in the Title bout. After Aoki's story arc, the game shifts again to another of Ippo's senpai, Tatsuya Kimura, who began boxing with Aoki. His story is very similar to Aoki's in that he also enters the Class A Tournament and loses. Afterward, he begins his comeback that eventually leads to winning the Junior Lightweight Championship fight against Ryo Mashiba. Kimura's story is also different than the manga in that he lost several of the fights and did not become the Junior Lightweight Champion.

The story switches again to Mamoru Takamura. His story is the most similar to the manga in that he is the only character in the series to have never lost a fight. It begins with Takamura as the Japanese Middleweight Champion, defending his title against the Class A Tournament winner. After winning, Takamura and the others go to a lodge in the mountains to train. While there he encounters a mountain bear that he knocks out. After having a successful boxing career in Japan, Takamura aims for a world title and receives a challenge from the World Junior Middleweight Champion, Brian Hawk. Takamura begins a strict weight management program to drop to Hawk's weight class. When they eventually fight, Takamura is victorious and becomes the new Junior Middleweight Champion of the world.

After the main boxers have been played, Ippo visits his coach, Genji Kamogawa, at the mountain lodge. While there, he learns about Kamogawa's history as a boxer via a flash back story. Kamogawa and his longtime friend and rival, Ginpachi Nekota, were both boxers before World War II. After the war, they boxed in exhibition matches. The two boxed each other often and once they met Yuki, a young girl from Hiroshima, their rivalry grew. While boxing, Kamogawa severely injured Nekota, but Nekota hide it because of their friendship. One day, Ralph Anderson, an American soldier stationed in their area, challenged and beat up the local boxers to show American dominance over Japanese boxers. Nekota challenges Anderson, but loses due to developing punch-drunk syndrome from his fight with Kamogawa. During the fight, Anderson used an illegal punch on Nekota that worsened his condition. After Nekota's defeat, Kamogawa begins intensive training to defeat Anderson. Through his training, he develops an "iron fist" technique. He then challenges Anderson, who because of his near loss has also trained extensively. After defeating Anderson, Kamogawa vows to pass on his boxing spirit to his students in order to show his boxing to the world.

== Development and release ==
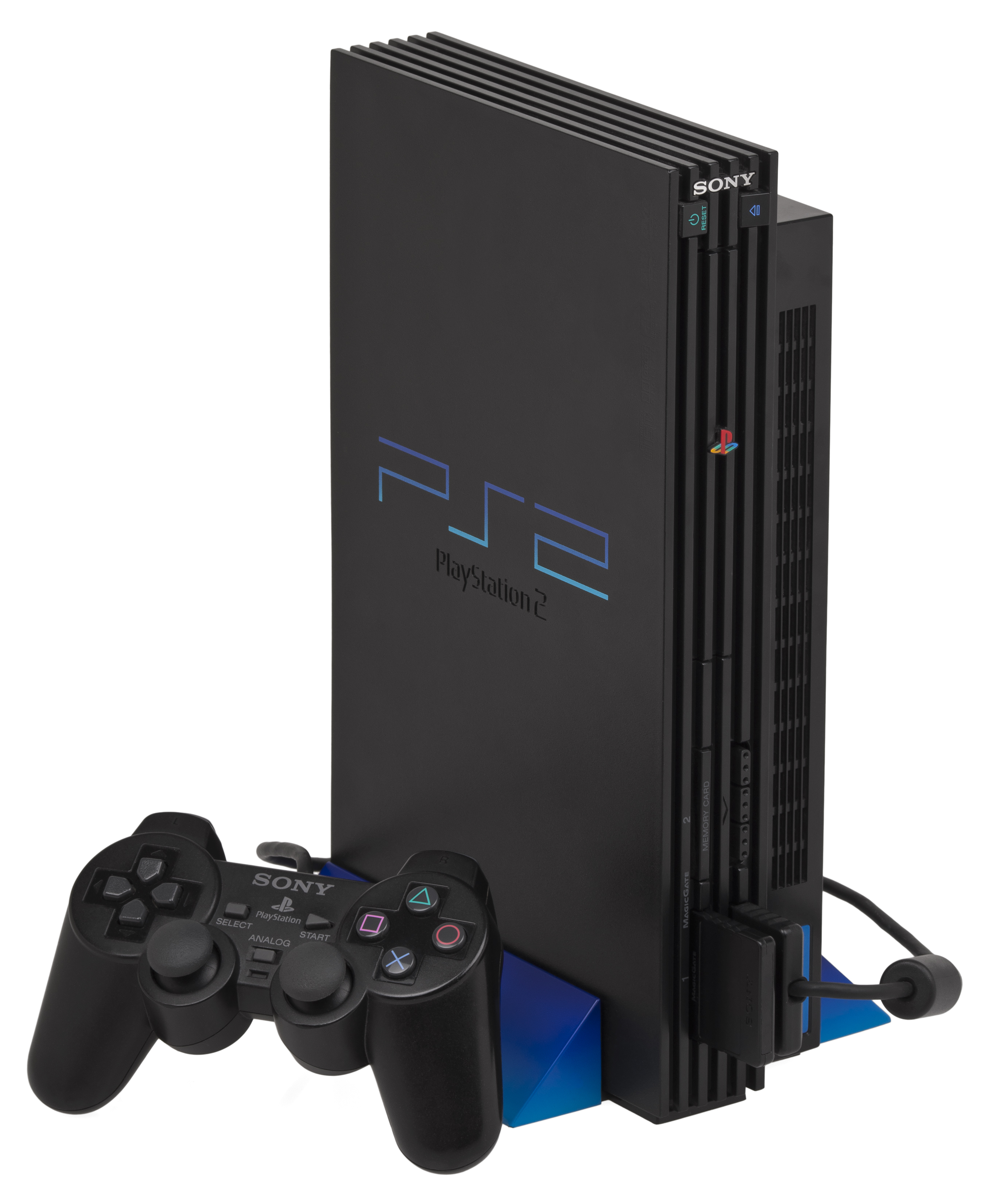
Victorious Boxers was developed exclusively for the PlayStation 2 and used the capabilities of the DualShock 2 controller.

Victorious Boxers: Ippo's Road to Glory was produced by Entertainment Software Publishing and was adapted from the Fighting Spirit manga series, at a time when the publishing company was focusing on its licensed comic properties rather than original titles. Development for the game was handled by New Corporation. The developers noted the capacities of the PlayStation 2 allowed them to reproduce the characters of the series accurately. The soundtrack of the game was composed by Takayuki Aihara, Shinji Hosoe and Naoki Tsuchiya.

In May 2001, British video game company Empire Interactive announced it would publish the game in Europe and North America. Since Empire's presence in the United States market was minimal, a distribution deal was passed with Vivendi Universal for them to distribute the game, along with six other titles, in North America. While the Japanese cover features artwork from the manga series, the publishers eschewed the ties to the manga for Western releases. The editors of Official U.S. PlayStation Magazine attributed the change to consumers' lack of awareness about the source material in Western regions compared to Japan. The magazine editors included a completed save-state of the game on the pack-in PlayStation Underground disc of the July 2002 issue. Entertainment Software released an updated version, subtitled Championship Version, (Note: はじめの一歩 VICTORIOUS BOXERS ～CHAMPIONSHIP VERSION～, Hajime no Ippo: Victorious Boxers ~Championship Version~; lit. 'The First Step: Victorious Boxers ~Championship Edition~') on June 27, 2002, in Japan for a reduced price. Changes consisted of mirror matches that allow the same character to fight himself, character balance adjustments, and fixes to punch trajectories.

== Reception ==
Reception

Aggregate score
Aggregator	Score
Metacritic	75/100

Review scores
Publication	Score
Consoles +	76%
Famitsu	33/40
Game Informer	7.75/10
GameSpot	8.5/10
GameSpy	(favorable)
GameZone	7.6/10
IGN	8.6/10
Jeuxvideo.com	10/20
Next Generation	3/5
Official U.S. PlayStation Magazine	3.5/5

The game received "generally favorable reviews" according to the review aggregation website Metacritic. In Japan, Famitsu gave it a score of one eight, one nine, and two eights for a total of 33 out of 40. Many reviews commented that the anime/manga style of characters and use of Japanese names were a turn off to US gamers who were more familiar with boxing games like Knockout Kings or Ready 2 Rumble. NextGen stated, "It's arguably the best 3D boxing game yet" and the versus mode offered "solid replay value".

Many reviews commented on the graphics, citing there were other games with better graphics at the time. GamePro rated the overall graphics 3.5 out of 5. Though the graphics were not well received, the character animations were very well received. The lack of audio dialog, which forced the player to read text for the story mode, was also a negative when many other games on the PS2 at the time were adding in voice overs. GamePro rated the overall sound 3 out of 5. Other reviews rated the audio better, particularly the music and sound effects during the fights.

The gameplay received mixed reviews. Reviews stated that Victorious Boxers was one of the most technically accurate boxing games of its time. Matt Helgeson of Game Informer described it as dramatically different from the "combo-intensive, somewhat sluggish feel" of Knockout Kings. GameSpot stated the controls gave players "better boxer control", and the "AI of the computer opponents is extremely advanced". While many critics complimented the control scheme, they also commented on its difficulty to master. A common complaint was about characters improperly positioning itself in relation to the opponent while circling the ring. GamePro rated both the controls and fun factor a 4.5 out of 5, and mentioned though the controls were very intuitive and precise, "they require a lot of brainwork and dexterity". NextGen commented on the initial controls, stating they are problematic at first but can be reconfigured to suit the player.

In Japan, the game was the fourth best-selling game of December 14, 2000, and sold 256,000 units by February 18, 2001. By September 2001, its sales in Japan alone surpassed 300,000 units. It did not sell well in the U.S., however, mainly due to very little name recognition and poor marketing. The game was later nominated for The Electric Playground's 2001 Blister Awards for "Best Console Fighting Game" (though the game itself was not reviewed), as well as the 2002 Interactive Achievement Award for "Console Fighting", but ultimately lost both awards to Dead or Alive 3 for Xbox. It did win the award for "Best Game No One Played" at GameSpot's Best and Worst of 2001 Awards.

== Legacy ==
Following Victorious Boxers's success, other developers mimicked its gameplay mechanics. GamePro magazine editors noted that Electronic Arts adopted a similar control scheme for Knockout Kings 2002. The damage and fatigue mechanic sans heads-up display meters was also applied. Reviewers for Gamer Informer and Official Xbox Magazine both echoed similar observations about the Total Punch Control system in Fight Night 2004, Electronic Arts' successor to the Knockout Kings series. Soon after the 2002 release of Knockout Kings, Electronic Gaming Monthly reported that Electronic Arts was considering having New Corporation take over development of the Knockout Kings series to inject new life into the franchise.

Victorious Boxers was followed by sequels on other video game consoles. The first title was Hajime no Ippo: The Fighting! (はじめの一歩 THE FIGHTING！), which was released only in Japan on December 12, 2002, for the Game Boy Advance. The game features 2D graphics rather than 3D, and uses the Game Link Cable for two-player gameplay. Two titles were released on the PlayStation 2; Hajime no Ippo 2: Victorious Road and Victorious Boxers 2: Fighting Spirit. Hajime no Ippo 2: Victorious Road was released on January 29, 2004, exclusively in Japan, and features a fighter-creation mode and new boxers. Victorious Boxers 2: Fighting Spirit was originally released in Japan on December 22, 2004, as Hajime no Ippo: All-Stars (はじめの一歩 ALL☆STARS), and features gameplay similar to the first Victorious Boxers. It was later released in Europe in 2005 and in North America in 2006. A title for the Wii, Victorious Boxers: Revolution (はじめの一歩 REVOLUTION, Hajime no Ippo: Revolution), was released in Japan on June 21, 2007. It was later released in North America in October 2007, and in PAL regions in 2008. The game uses the Wii's Wii Remote motion-sensing controllers to simulate punching.
