= Evolution 2: Far Off Promise =

1999 video game

- North American Dreamcast cover art
- Developer: Sting
- Publishers: JP: ESP; WW: Ubi Soft; TW: Dysin Interactive Corp.
- Composer: Masaharu Iwata
- Platforms: Dreamcast, Microsoft Windows
- Release: Dreamcast; JP: December 23, 1999; NA: June 29, 2000; EU: November 23, 2001 Windows; TW: November 23, 2002
- Genres: Roguelike, role-playing
- Mode: Single-player

Evolution 2: Far Off Promise (神機世界エヴォリューション2 遠い約束, Shinkisekai Evoryūshon 2 Tōi Yakusoku) is a role-playing video game for the Dreamcast console. It is a sequel to Evolution: The World of Sacred Device. It was developed by Sting and published by Ubi Soft in North America. In Japan it was published by ESP, while in Taiwan a Microsoft Windows version was published by Dysin Interactive Corp.

Evolution 2: Far Off Promise was also released for the European market in 2001 as one of the last European Dreamcast games. In the UK the game was exclusive to the video game chain Game.

Like the first Evolution game, Evolution 2 is a dungeon crawler. Unlike the first, Evolution 2 has both random and predetermined dungeon maps.

This game and Evolution: The World of the Sacred Device were remade into Evolution Worlds on the GameCube.

== Plot ==
Less than a year after the events of Evolution: The World of Sacred Device, Mag Launcher has become known as the number one explorer of Pannam Town and is invited by the Society to visit Museville via the newly built railroad and there undertake the recovery of a series of especially valuable artifacts for the Society's president, Professor Whitehead. Mag accepts, and is accompanied to Museville by his fellow adventurer and constant companion, Linear Cannon, and the Launcher family butler, Gre Nade.

While the adventurers complete Whitehead's assignments, Linear is periodically visited by a mysterious boy named Yurka. He reveals to Linear that he is an artificial life form like her, and shows her how their powers compliment each other: When he kills a wilting flower with his power, Linear's power sprouts up four new flowers from its remains, when previously she could only restore dying organisms. Linear tells Mag about Yurka, but he innocently assumes that they are just friends.

The artifacts acquired by Mag are stolen from the Society by the Red Wolves, a group of bandits. The Society bugged the artifacts with a tracer, and sends Mag's group to the Red Wolves' hideout at Pine Village. After they escape the bandits' traps, Mag has earned the respect and liking of their leader, Carcano. He turns the artifacts over to Mag. Yurka summons Mag outside the hideout and tells him to stay away from Linear without explaining why. When Mag refuses, Yurka strikes him down with his power and departs. As Mag rages about this unprovoked aggression, Linear defends Yurka, prompting Mag to start shunning her.

Mag returns the artifacts to the Society and convinces them to leave Carcano alone by falsely reporting that the Red Wolves have promised to reform. Yurka again visits Linear and tells her to leave Mag. He says that humans will always fear and pursue beings like them, and that as a result Mag will be in danger so long as she is with him, making her a constant burden. Linear discards the ocarina Mag gave her and leaves with Yurka to the Society headquarters, where they use the artifacts acquired by Mag to travel to the world of the technologically advanced pre-apocalyptic civilization which created Linear and Yurka. Once Mag and Gre find Linear missing and track her to the Society headquarters, Carcano helps them break in. Whitehead confesses that he was collaborating with Yurka in order to discover the secrets of the Ancients; inviting Mag to Museville was in fact Yurka's idea. After Whitehead helped him open the portal, Yurka betrayed him.

Mag pursues Linear and Yurka through the portal, where Yurka explains that he and Linear were created because the ancient civilization suffered from illnesses which made them lose their desire to live. Yurka was meant to destroy everything and Linear to raise up a new species from the remains, thus achieving evolution. Yurka and Linear are absorbed into a device called Ulticannon, which was created to connect them and amplify their powers, and set about fulfilling their assigned role. Mag plays Linear's ocarina and confesses his feelings for her, leading her to break off from the Ulticannon gestalt in order to be with Mag. Mag and Linear plead with Yurka to break off from Ulticannon as well, but separated from Linear, Yurka becomes consumed with jealousy and despair. Mag and his group destroy Ulticannon in order to stop him from destroying humanity. The released Yurka apologizes for his actions. Mag tells him they can be friends now, but Yurka dies after thanking them and saying he is glad to have lived.

Mag comforts Linear over Yurka's death and gives her a birthday present. As Mag, Linear, and Gre return to Pannam Town, Gre discovers a hotel bill, revealing that the Society is sticking them with the boarding costs, which are far greater than the rewards they were paid for recovering the artifacts.

== Reception ==
Reception

Aggregate score
Aggregator	Score
GameRankings	66%

Review scores
Publication	Score
AllGame	2.5/5
CNET Gamecenter	7/10
Electronic Gaming Monthly	6.17/10 (Note: Two critics of Electronic Gaming Monthly gave the Dreamcast version each a score of 7/10, and the other gave it 4.5/10.)
EP Daily	6.5/10
Famitsu	29/40
Game Informer	6/10
GameFan	87%
GameRevolution	C
GameSpot	5.7/10
GameSpy	6/10
IGN	4.5/10
Next Generation	3/5

The Dreamcast version received "average" reviews according to the review aggregation website GameRankings. Jeff Lundrigan of NextGen called it "an experience to be savored and enjoyed." In Japan, Famitsu gave it a score of 29 out of 40.

Four-Eyed Dragon of GamePro said in one review, "Fans of Evolution won't be disappointed with this vivid world that's full of familiar faces and tactics. Yet, as in the first Evolution, the gameplay is geared for younger adventurers – hardcore role-players will want to hold out for a deeper story and greater challenge." (Note: GamePro gave the game 4/5 for graphics, two 3.5/5 scores for sound and fun factor, and 4.5/5 for control in one review.) In another review, E. Coli said that the game "establishes the series as being aimed at younger players who may find the complexities of the average RPG too challenging. It is definitely aimed at the short attention span crowd. Dreamcast owners are still waiting for someone to deliver a quality RPG, but fear not, several promising titles are slated for release in the next few months and one of them is bound to be a winner." (Note: GamePro gave the game two 3/5 scores for graphics and fun factor, 2.5/5 for sound, and 4/5 for control in another review.)
