= List of Hajime no Ippo characters =

This is a list of the fictional characters that appear in the manga and anime series Hajime no Ippo (はじめの一歩), also known as Fighting Spirit. Characters are grouped by the boxing gym they are a member of.

== Kamogawa Gym ==
=== Ippo Makunouchi ===
Ippo Makunouchi (幕之内 一歩, Makunouchi Ippo)

Voiced by: Kōhei Kiyasu

Ippo is the main protagonist of the series. His boldness as a boxer is juxtaposed with his shy and amiable personality outside the ring. He lives with his mother, Hiroko Makunouchi, and helps with the family charter boat fishing business—a job which has developed his lower body well enough to become an effective boxer. When he was young, Ippo used to get bullied and picked on by others in his school. As fate would have it, Takamura came upon Ippo as he was getting a beating from a couple of bullies and decided to help him. Takamura saw something in Ippo and introduced him to the world of boxing. After seeing a video of Tyson, Ippo becomes inspired to take up boxing to feel reborn with strength and asks Takamura to get him into Kamogawa Gym. Immediately after arriving at Kamogawa Gym he impresses Takamura and Kamogawa with his explosive punching power and guts in the ring. Like he has with Takamura, Kamogawa personally takes on Ippo as his pupil and starts him on the path to being a pro boxer. Since then, Takamura has treated Ippo like a younger brother and has taken him under his wing.

Ippo is described as an in-fighter (though, he resembles more of a boxer-puncher) and is well known for his comeback KO victories, his Peek-a-Boo-style defense and his heavy blows which include three signature punches: a rib-cracking Liver blow, Gazelle punch (an uppercut variant), and the Dempsey roll, modeled after punches used by Mike Tyson, Floyd Patterson, and Jack Dempsey, respectively. He stands at 164 cm (5 ft 5 in) tall with a 165 cm (5 ft 5 in) reach and has consistently weighed 126 pounds (57 kg). His natural talents include stamina, balance and enough punching power to turn around a match instantly; combined with his superb fighting spirit, these assets lead to his comebacks victories and have allowed him to overcome any technical shortcomings. His destructive Dempsey roll technique has been a particular focus in the story and has continued to evolve through the series: in the match with Sawamura, he added a rapid stop-and-start to prevent it from being countered, and against Jimmy Sisfa, he incorporated an uppercut to the rotation, but Makunouchi needs to continue to develop his lower body to use these without risking further injury. He temporarily stopped using the Dempsey roll in order to refine his basics and become a more complete boxer. His nickname is the God of Wind, coined after the force of his powerful blows. In addition, his intense training has allowed him to mimic some fighters' specialities with a degree of success such as Sendo's smash attacks or Jimmy Sisfa's jolt attacks during their matches.

During his fight with Sendo, Ippo showed the Dempsey roll's perfect form. Since the Dempsey roll could not be used if the opponent will not back down, Ippo utilized all three of his techniques. Starting with the liver blow, which damaged Sendo's right ribs, Ippo then used a feint with his own version of "Sakki" (killing intent), called "Courage", making Sendo raise his guard. Ippo then followed up with the Gazelle punch (an uppercut using the strength of the legs for additional power), which made Sendo's jaw fly up and stunned him for a few seconds. Taking the opportunity of Sendo being stunned, Ippo then revved up his Dempsey roll which hit Sendo a couple of times before knocking him out. Ippo used the same pattern of attack on his first title defense with Sanada but due to the damage that he sustained his attack stopped after a couple of hits.

Hajime no Ippo has covered each of Makunouchi's fights, starting with his introduction to the boxing world and winning the All Japan Rookie Kings tournament in a talented rookie Featherweight class that has produced four national champions and two OPBF Champions in varying weight classes thus far. The story continues with his ascension to becoming the Japanese Featherweight Champion, a title he defends eight times before relinquishing the belt to focus on the world title, a journey he began by challenging other national title holders in the OPBF. His current record as a professional boxer is 26 matches, 23 wins and 3 losses with all 23 victories by KO, and at his peak he had held the seventh ranking in the WBC. His only losses are to Eiji Date in his first attempt to challenge for the Japanese Featherweight title, his first Mexican opponent in the professional ring Alfredo Gonzales who was ranked #2 in the WBC at the time, and Filipino Featherweight Champion Antonio Guevara after making a 10-month comeback. He won three tournaments: the East Japan Rookie King Tournament, the All Japan Rookie King Tournament and the Class A tournament. He was nominated boxer of the tournament in these competitions. He fought only twice sparring matches, both against Miyata.

Date would go on to challenge Ricardo Martinez—the only man he had ever lost to in the ring—for the world title, but the injuries he sustained in his title bout forced him to retire and pass the baton to Ippo. Date's young son, Yūji, who had watched his father's defeat from the crowd asks Ippo if he'll fight Ricardo as the Japanese champion after his father, to which Ippo declines, stating Ricardo is too strong for him as he is now. After eight Japanese featherweight title defenses and wins over other Asian national champions from Thailand, the Philippines, and Indonesia, Ippo's fight with Mexican boxer Alfredo Gonzales for the #2 spot in the WBC World Rankings was his first loss since becoming champion. While Gonzales dominated most of the fight, Ippo was able to knock him down and caused Gonzales to begrudgingly accept Ippo's strength. Gonzales won the fight after being luckily saved from a second knockdown by the ropes and caused massive damage to Ippo in his final attack.

After the fight, Ippo makes a promise to Kumi Mashiba that the next time he loses in the ring will be his last and he will retire without regrets. At the same time, fears of becoming "punch drunk" manifest when Ippo finds himself underperforming in spars and displaying symptoms such as becoming forgetful and being unable to draw in a straight line, a concern and suspicision shared with the Kamogawa Gym, who ban him from the gym for one month despite his insistence on his good health. Ten months after the fight with Gonzalez, Ippo returns to the ring to fight Filipino Featherweight Champion Antonio Guevara with the goal of unveiling a new Dempsey roll, but loses due to fatigue before being able to display the fruits of his training to his expectations, feeling indebted to Coach Kamogawa who had supported him for so long. Ippo retires after this fight as promised due to his own worry over punch drunk syndrome and injuries he sustained, prioritizing his ability to work in the family business for his mother's sake over boxing. He is currently employed as a second at the Kamogawa gym while acting as a trainer for his new, young pupils Taihei Aoki and Kintarō Kaneda.

=== Mamoru Takamura ===
Mamoru Takamura (鷹村 守, Takamura Mamoru)

Voiced by: Rikiya Koyama

Takamura is an undefeated three-time World Champion boxer of the Kamogawa gym. The other fighters there look up to him and feed off of his energy, and he is their unspoken emotional leader. Like a big brother, he teases them without tact and facetiously bullies them constantly, but he also gives them advice and helps them to become better boxers. Takamura also has an insatiable appetite for women, which is only overshadowed by his obsession for victory. At one point when training in the mountains, he runs afoul of a mother bear who he defeated by repeatedly punching it in the forehead, but not before it clawed deep gouges into his chest and arms. The weakened bear is later shot and killed by Nekota (to fulfill a request Takamura had for bear stew), and Takamura was dubbed "The Bear Slayer". Sometimes he honors the moniker by wearing the Bear pelt, bearing his scars proudly.

During one of his title defense fights, (He was advised by Coach Kamogawa beforehand that he will soon be contending for the world as WBC is eyeing him already) Takamura defeated his challenger using only his left hand, starting from left jabs that evolved to left straights, proving the old adage "He who rules with his left rules the World" as stated by Nekota - and that it was Takamura's declaration to the world if his intent. The boxing commentator stated further that Takamura has proven that "Japan is too small for him".

He originally was a delinquent who often got into fights. Because of his strength, he usually left his victims with serious injuries. He was disowned by his family due to a brawl he initiated with some fans who were booing his older brother in a rugby match. By the time the brawl was over, at least twenty people were injured. After the incident, Takamura continues to brawl in the streets out of utter boredom until he meets Coach Kamogawa, who stepped in to keep him from killing someone after noting his powerful right. After weeks of relentless running and forcing him to use only left jabs - and without a single sparring session - Takamura defeats his first opponent twenty-five seconds into the first round. He works his way to becoming the JBC Middleweight Champion, and then moves on to defeat Bryan Hawk to become the WBC Junior Middleweight Champion, and then beats David Eagle for the WBC Middleweight Championship, and then beats Richard Bison to win the WBA Middleweight Championship and unify both the WBC and WBA Middleweight Championships (which makes him the only current World Champion from Japan). His current aspiration is to conquer the next four classes up through heavyweight.

Morikawa described Takamura as the best pound for pound fighter in the series. According to Morikawa, he has the ideal blend of athleticism, technique, intelligence, and instincts. Even before he started boxing, his physical abilities were already world class, but despite his prodigious natural talent, his determination to achieve greatness has led him to work tirelessly at his craft and reach the world stage. He is the former Japanese Middleweight Champion, the former WBC Junior Middleweight Champion, former unified WBC and WBA Middleweight Champion, and the current WBC Super middleweight champion. Takamura currently holds a record of 27–0–0, with all twenty-seven wins coming by knockout.

=== Others ===
Masaru Aoki (青木 勝, Aoki Masaru)

Voiced by: Wataru Takagi
Ippo's senpai and Kimura's best friend. Aoki provides much of the gym's comic relief and exercises one of the world's most unusual fighting styles. A few of his signature techniques include the fan-favorite Frog Punch, double punch, an untorqued (ineffective) corkscrew punch, and the utterly ridiculous Lookaway (which has also been adopted by Takamura). In the past, he and Kimura were the toughest high-school thugs around, but now Aoki's real job is at a ramen restaurant. Due to the numerous times being dumped by the pretty girls in high school, he has developed a taste for women with unattractive faces. He has fought for the Japanese lightweight championship, losing in a draw, and shares an apartment with his girlfriend, Tomiko, a friend of Kumi Mashiba whose nice personality and good body more than compensate for her less-than-stellar face. Aoki seems to be based on either former world champion Jorge Páez, or hardcore fight fan hero Emanuel Augustus for their offbeat fighting styles and records. His current record stands at 29 Matches 19–7–3 (W–L–D), with 12 KOs, and the best rank he reached is 1st in Lightweight. His signature "Look Away" technique is based on a skill former World Middleweight Champion Jake LaMotta had used in his career and his signature move the "Frog Punch" is based on real-life former world champion Koichi Wajima whose signature move was called the "Frog Jump".
Aoki is ranked 7th in JBC Lightweight rankings.

Tatsuya Kimura (木村 達也, Kimura Tatsuya)

Voiced by (English): Grant George
Voiced by (Japanese): Keiji Fujiwara
Ippo's senpai and Aoki's best friend. He is the smooth, collected type and a romantic at heart, but trains as hard as anyone. His style incorporates a fast left and faster footwork and is considered by Miyata to have "no weaknesses" yet, it also does not have strengths either which creates Kimura's weakness. In the OVA, which was dedicated to Kimura, he is in training for his bid for the Japanese junior lightweight championship against Ryo Mashiba, he developed a devastating vertical combination known as the Dragon Fish Blow, which Kimura learned while watching his pet fish jump up and eat his meal in front of him. Another interesting fact is that, out of all the opponents that had fought Ryo Mashiba, Kimura is the only one Ryo had feared during a match. In the past, he and Aoki were the toughest high-school thugs around, but now Tatsuya's real job is at his family's flower shop. His current record stands at 28 Matches 17–6–5 (W–L–D), with 12 KOs, and the best rank he reach is 3rd in Jr. Lightweight. However, this rank was enough for him to get a title match, because the 1st & 2nd resigned from fear of Mashiba.
Kimura is ranked 7th in the JBC Jr. Lightweight rankings. After losing to Ryo Mashiba, he announced his retirement from boxing. Shortly after, unable to stay away from boxing, he returned saying he would spell his name in katakana (タツヤ, Tatsuya) instead of kanji (達也,, Tatsuya). Kimura's character seems to be at least partially based on former world champion "Fearless" Freddie Pendleton, who had been a journeyman fighter his entire career, yet was still able to fight on even terms with some of the best in the world with his high level of skill.

Manabu Itagaki (板垣学, Itagaki Manabu)

Voiced by: Daisuke Namikawa
The most recent addition to the roster, the charming Manabu has a prodigy's talent and was the captain of his high school's boxing team. Cheerful and a lover of bad puns (as are the rest of his family), Manabu is a fierce hybrid boxer with extremely high speed and reflexes and whose fighting style is uncanny in its resemblance to Miyata's. His most powerful technique is a furious hail of mid-power blows known as the Hedgehog or Porcupine, which was employed in an East Japan Rookie Kings showdown with his longtime nemesis, Kyosuke Imai. Outside of boxing, Manabu is employed as an assistant at the Makunouchi family's fishing business. He has a big crush on Kumi but prefers to keep his feelings for himself because of his respect for his Idol Ippo. Itagaki's character is based on retired world champion Sugar Ray Leonard for his prodigy-like natural ability and good looks, whom Itagaki is said to be like in the manga. His current record as the Rookie King of his class stands at 17 Matches 15–2 (W–L–D), with 10 KOs.
Itagaki is currently listed as 3rd in JBC Featherweight and 5th in OPBF Featherweight rankings, also Itagaki is one of the speed square which consists of former 3rd and 5th seed, but now retired Saeki, Karasawa, and Fukui. He is currently aiming for Ippo's vacated Japanese Championship as Ippo seeks to aim for the world championship.
Recently, it's been shown that Itagaki has become quite smitten for Kumi, but he realizes the feelings are not mutual.

- Genji Kamogawa (鴨川 源二, Kamogawa Genji)

Voiced by: Kenji Utsumi (2000–2009), Shōzō Iizuka (2013–2014), Mamoru Miyano (young)
Head coach and founder of the Kamogawa gym. He fought as a prizefighter in Japan shortly after the end of the Second World War. Along with his friends, Ginpachi Nekota and Dankichi Hama, Kamogawa developed a style of fighting that both presumably became the forerunner of boxing in Japan and emphasized scientific theory in its techniques. In his prime, Kamogawa's talents included the fearsome, yet self-destructive, Tekken (Iron Fist) blow which is a left hook body blow enough to knock someone down and an unyielding spirit which has been passed onto his students. As a coach, Kamogawa's wealth of knowledge and experience has been tapped into on multiple occasions during training as well as in matches. He may seem to be a bit gruff towards his boxers, but maintains very strong relationships based on trust and spirit; i.e., he rescued Takamura from his life as a thug by introducing him to boxing. Although he rarely admits it aloud, he is extremely proud of his two best reliable straight-forward boxers, Takamura and Ippo.
During Ippo's comeback fight, Coach Kamogawa was hospitalized due to over fatigue. Therefore not being able to teach Ippo a technique that would utilize both attacking and defending simultaneously. He was shocked during Ippo's match with Ponchai when, during the timeout after the first round, Ippo declares a Knock Out within the Second Round. Coach Kamogawa's pride was lifted up, however, when Ippo did the Dempsey roll for the first time, not even knowing what it was called.
Ippo's matches with Volg and Sanada proved how tight the bond between the Coach and his athlete is. During Ippo's fight with Volg, Ippo made a remark to Kamogawa: "Amazing". Kamogawa thought that Ippo was referring to Volg's Power. Ippo stated "I followed everything you taught me during training and it's working.". During the end of the fight with Sanada, Ippo was sitting on the neutral corner due to the damage he sustained from the fight. Kamogawa reached out a hand to Ippo to let him up and Ippo stared in amazement at his Coach's hand, referring to it as "The hand that pushed me to exceed my limit".

- Haruhiko Yagi (八木 晴彦, Yagi Haruhiko)

Voiced by: Toshihiko Nakajima
The manager of Kamogawa Gym and a part-time trainer. Friendly and knowledgeable, "Yagi-chan" (as his pupils affectionately call him) is also in charge of securing match posters, selling tickets, and anything else involving the gym's finances. He knows a great deal about boxing himself, having been a boxer at Kamogawa Gym once. He usually is the one that handles the setting of matches often telling the boxers about their opponents. Yagi also accompanies the coach on various forays outside the gym trying to find strong opponents for their boxers. Additionally, although Yagi was not a skilled boxer nor a good second member, but he is a master fisherman who can outfish anyone.

- Trainer Shinoda (篠田 トレーナー, Shinoda Trainer)

Voiced by: Seiji Sasaki
One of the trainers at the Kamogawa Gym. Because he oversees the training of some of Kamogawa boxers, he is normally a second to some of them during their matches; in fact, he knows Aoki, Kimura, and Itagaki even better than the Coach does. Because of Aoki & Kimura's reputation for "mud slinging" matches, they would sometimes jokingly blame Shinoda for improperly training them and calling him the "Trainer From Hell". Shinoda almost resigned when he felt that he might not be able to draw out Itagaki's full potential.

== Kawahara Gym ==
=== Ichirō Miyata ===
Ichirō Miyata (宮田 一郎, Miyata Ichirō)

Voiced by: Tomokazu Seki
Makunouchi's idol and foil, Miyata is a very skilled outboxer with a cool demeanor that specializes in counter punches. Considered by many to be a boxing prodigy, he uses the same boxing style that his father used. After his father was forced to retire, Miyata decided to take on his style of boxing to prove its worth on the world stage. He begins at Kamogawa Gym, where he eventually meets Ippo and has a pair of spars with him. The first is a Miyata victory, but one where he is pushed unexpectedly hard by Ippo who had no fighting experience. He loses in their second spar and later transfers to Kawahara Gym in hopes of one day facing Ippo in an official match. At first, Miyata looked down on Ippo after he was embarrassed in their first spar, but grew respect for him over the next few months and now has developed a friendly rivalry.
Miyata was a highly touted rookie and enjoyed early success in East Japan Rookie Championship until he was defeated by Ryo Mashiba who stepped on his foot and sprained his ankle. After recovering and graduating high school, he tells Ippo that he is going on a tour through Thailand and Korea to improve his skills until he closes the gap between them. Miyata has trained all across the Pacific and eventually returns to the mainstream boxing scene as the main contender to the OPBF featherweight title. Together with the Jolt Counter, an effective full-body counter punch, Miyata KO'd Australian boxer Arnie Gregory to become the current regional champion. He has defended his title five times, all by KO, boosting him up to the fifth ranked Featherweight in the WBC. Most recently, Miyata defeated Randy Boy Jr., the OPBF interim champion who was crowned during Miyata's absence due to broken fists.
Unfortunately Miyata's 172-centimetre-tall (5 ft 8 in) frame is better suited for the Junior Lightweight or Lightweight class than Featherweight class; due to that, he tends to fight one match per month to keep his weight below the 126 lb featherweight limit. Despite the drain on his power and stamina, he endures without complaint for two reasons: the first is the hope of facing his rival Makunouchi, and the second is a tactical decision to achieve a "dry out", the effect of enhancing the body's senses and focus through strenuous weight management. In stark contrast to Makunouchi, Miyata has brilliant speed, technique and boxing intelligence, but he has a glass jaw like his father and lacks durability, power and stamina. To compensate, he uses high-risk, high-reward counters that require both great courage and precision. This means his style is more aggressive and more "soulful" than the typical outboxer who use hit-and-run methods like Itagaki. His speed and style have earned him the nickname "God of Thunder" or "Lightning God" and his punches are often referred to as the "Prince's Blade" for their sharpness. Morikawa has said in interviews that he also based Miyata on his personal friend, Naoto Takahashi, a former Japan and OPBF champion.
Miyata currently holds a record of 23–1–1 with 21 knockouts and is the reigning OPBF Featherweight Champion. Writer Morikawa described him as the third best pound for pound fighter in his Hajime no Ippo universe, behind only Mamoru Takamura and Ricardo Martinez.

- Toshio Suzuki (鈴木 利男, Suzuki Toshio)

Voiced by: Keiichi Sonobe
Suzuki is a veteran boxer in-fighter specialist who was ranked 2nd in Featherweight at the time Ippo entered the Class A tournament; he challenged Date Eiji in the title match and lost by TKO in the first round, also he lost in the Class A tournament Semi-Final against Volg Zangief very badly after which he retires due to his age.

- Miyata's Father (宮田の父, Miyata no Chichi)

Voiced by: Unshō Ishizuka
Ichiro Miyata's father and coach, and the one who passed on to him the love of boxing. He is a former a Japan and OPBF champion and considered a world contender when he was in his prime. When Ichiro was a very young boy, Miyata lost his seventh OPBF title defense to Randy "Raccoon" Boy, father of Randy Boy Jr., in a fight where both fighters suffered severe career ending injuries (Boy would go on to challenge the world title, but was not the same and died soon after). Miyata himself shattered his jaw in the last round despite leading in the score cards, so he chose to retire despite having the chance to make a comeback. As a witness of his father's fall from grace, Ichiro decided to take on his style and become the best with it. Also during his reign as the champion of Japan, he defeated Sendo's trainer, Yanaoka.

- Kida (木田)

Voiced by: Tōru Ōkawa
Miyata's manager.

== Naniwa Gym ==
=== Takeshi Sendō ===
Takeshi Sendō (千堂 武士, Sendō Takeshi)

Voiced by: Masaya Onosaka (Japanese); Doug Erholtz (English)

Sendō is an aggressive mid-range fighter, and his specialty punch is the "Smash", Deadly Smash and Ultra Low Smash which was popularized and created by Donovan Ruddock. He resides in the Naniwa Ward of Osaka, where he is known as "Rocky" and the "Naniwa Tiger" - although he emphatically denies any relation to the fictional character, explaining that the "Rocky" nickname was influenced by his power boxing style similar to that of Rocky Marciano, the only heavyweight champion in history to retire undefeated. In a recent interview with Shōnen Magazine, Hajime no Ippo's manga artist, George Morikawa said that Hidekazu Akai was also one of his models for Sendo. Like Sendo, Akai was from Osaka and was nicknamed the Naniwa Rocky.

Sendo's mother died after childbirth, so he spent his first years with his father and paternal grandmother, raised under the motto "you should protect those around you". When he was around five years old, his firefighter father died while rescuing a boy about the same age as Sendo during a blaze. Sendo, proud of his father's sacrifice, continued to follow his advice by trying to help others. He started by helping people from bullies, but eventually became very violent with his "justice". By high school, Sendo had already become one of the most feared street fighters and gang leaders in Osaka, but not attacking people, rather defending the weak.

One day while looking for people to test his strength against, he beat up several initiate boxers from the Naniwa boxing gym and met their coach, Yamaoka, who told him not to boast "until he knocked down a real boxer" (but privately bragged about his intensity). He followed Yamaoka to his gym and declared his intent to prove he was the strongest in Japan, going on to win the Western Japan Rookie Championship. As a result, he was slated to fight his counterpart Ippo, the Eastern Rookie King Champion, in the All Rookie King Japan Tournament. However, during the fight for the division title, Ippo injured his right hand and as a result decided to skip the fight. After finding this out, Sendo immediately leaves Naniwa for Tokyo and heads to the Kamogawa Gym to speak with Ippo—and as Sendo explained that all he wanted was to fight the strongest person he could and win, Ippo realized he felt the same way, and so decides to go on with the match despite his handicap, fighting with an anesthetized hand. In the end Sendo loses the fight by TKO—however, Ippo felt that the issue of who was strongest was still unresolved; at the end of the third round Sendo had unleashed a brutal flurry of blows that Ippo barely weathered before the bell rung, but at the start of the fourth round Sendo could not rise from his seat - Ippo had actually knocked him unconscious due to a blow to his temple, and his final attack was out of pure instinct.

Sendo has held the Japanese featherweight following a questionable win over Volg Zangief (that even Sendo himself did not accept gladly) to decide who would take the Featherweight Championship vacated after Eiji Date retired, defending it twice by KO. Ultimately not only would he lose the title to Ippo in their rematch but as a result of Ippo's devastating punches, he was shelved due to Ippo cracking his ribs with body blows and Liver blows. Despite their Rivalry, and Sendo's desire to avenge his losses, he has become good friends with Ippo as the series has progressed.

Following his recent comeback, Sendo holds a record of 21–2–0, with 20 KOs and is the former JBC Featherweight Champion. After several victories over highly ranked Mexican opposition, he becomes known as a 'Mexican Killer'. Sendo is ranked 5th by the WBA and declared his ambition to defeat the WBA champion, Ricardo Martinez albeit not before indirectly threatening Ippo's most recent opponent (and the boxer who handed the latter his second loss) Alfredo Gonzales, instructing his most recent knockout victim to inform Gonzales that he'll 'see him real soon.' Recently, George Morikawa released a 48-page one-shot manga focusing on Sendo before his time as a fighter. Sendo is based on legendary heavyweight world champion Rocky Marciano, whom Sendo admits he admires most, for his fearless style and passion for infighting.

=== Others ===
- Hiroyuki Hoshi (星 洋行, Hoshi Hiroyuki)

Sendo's Kouhai and equally as brash, though he is more polite towards Sendo. He joined the Naniwa Gym out of his admiration of Sendo and like Sendo, he was the West Japan Rookie King. Prior to boxing, Hoshi practiced Karate and would challenge other martial arts schools. He showed up at the gym one day and Sendo took his challenge. Sendo was the first man to stay standing from Hoshi's trademark move, the Ichigeki, a basic power punch from Karate thrown from the side of your body. Upon meeting with Ippo, he stated his plan of challenging Ippo right after he beat Itagaki for the Rookie King title, but he was unsuccessful and Itagaki won the match easily with his superior speed and reflexes.

- Yanaoka (柳岡)

Voiced by: Naoki Tatsuta
A still young ex-boxer who works as a coach in the Naniwa gym. As a boxer, he was able to achieve being the number one contender of the Japanese title, but was unable to defeat the champion which is later revealed to have been Miyata's father. When Sendo attacked him and some rookie boxers, Yanaoka was the only one who could resist Sendo's attacks and could even see his weak spots as a fighter. Thanks to him, Sendo joined the Naniwa gym.

== Toho Gym ==
- Ryō Mashiba (間柴 了, Mashiba Ryō)

Voiced by: Masahiko Tanaka
Known by ringnames such as the "Executioner" or "Shinigami (God of Death)" by those who watch his matches, Mashiba is one of the most intimidating boxers in the series. His greatest natural strength lies in his height of 177 cm and an incredible 187 cm reach. He effectively combines that inhuman reach with the Detroit version of the Hitman stance that was used by American boxer Thomas Hearns, who ruled 5 classes of boxing weights with this style, to create a devastating whiplike technique known as the Flicker Jab to eat away at his opponent's guard and resolve. Those fortunate and/or skilled enough to make it through his barrier-like Flicker still have to deal with his power-packed Chopping Right, which cuts down those who would deal damage up-close. Recently Mashiba has incorporated a devastating right uppercut into his repertoire, presumably to overcome his weakness to infighting.
After beating Miyata in the Rookie King Tournament semifinal (he even resorted to stepping on Miyata's foot to keep him close), he lost to Ippo in the final match. He later moves to Junior Lightweight Division where he reigns as Champion (defending the belt against Kimura in a very close match, amongst others) before losing to Sawamura by disqualification in one of the dirtiest, bloodiest matches ever seen in the series, due to Sawamura's dirty boxing and Mashiba's grudge against him. In that one match alone, almost all the fouls that could be committed were committed (by both fighters). In the end, although he manages to knocked Sawamura out (and out of the ring), Mashiba is ultimately deemed the loser by the referee for fouling. He is nearly off his year-long suspension and, according to his coach, is planning a title match for the OPBF Junior Lightweight Division.
Outside of the ring, Mashiba is a very quiet, if also very unnerving and scary figure who is spurred on to earn wages and box for prize money all to support both himself and his beloved younger sister, Kumi, orphaned after their parents died in a tragic accident many years ago; because of all his pain and the humiliation coming from others, Mashiba has developed a big resentment against the rest of the world, which only started to wear down after losing to Ippo; with time, he comes to not really mind the relationship Ippo has with Kumi (though he still keeps an eye on them whenever he can, watching for Kumi) and goes to his fights on occasion; he even entrusts Ippo to take revenge on Sawamura, who gave Kumi a cut on her cheek. After returning from a one-year suspension, Mashiba successfully moved closer to his natural weight by going to the Lightweight division, where he won the OPBF Lightweight Title in a grueling fight that ended in a come-from-behind knockout victory for Mashiba. He is currently ranked fifth in the world after taking the OPBF title.
As the reigning OPBF Lightweight Champion, Mashiba currently holds a record of 18–2–0, with 14 KOs and is the former JBC Jr. Lightweight Champion. His belt was lost to Ryuhei Sawamura, due to a disqualification on part of Mashiba's brutal attitude during the fight. Mashiba is based on former six-division world champion Thomas "Hitman" Hearns, for his exceptional height, reach, and use of the flicker jab.

== Otowa Gym ==
- Ryūichi Hayami (速水 龍一, Hayami Ryūichi)

Voiced by: Kōji Tsujitani
Known by the nickname "The Prodigy" he was a prodigy outboxer with incredibly fast punches, he is known for his "Shotgun", a barrage of fast punches intended to down his opponent quickly and decisively. Although he was a former Inter-High Champ, he lost to Ippo in the last second of the first round of the East Japan Rookie King Tournament. He later moves down to the Junior Featherweight Division where he lost to Kenta Kobashi for the JBC Jr. Featherweight Championship belt. Hayami's character is based on retired world champion Sugar Ray Leonard for his "Shotgun". After his loss to Kenta Kobashi for the Junior Featherweight championship, he retires from boxing due to his weak chin, seriously damaged in the fight with a one-two combination from Kobashi. He is an incredibly handsome fellow, very popular outside of boxing as a model and teenage idol, and has a legion of female followers who always cheer for him whether he wins or loses.

- Alexander Volg Zangief

(See Foreign boxers)

- Kyōsuke Imai (今井 京介, Imai Kyosuke)

Voiced by: Yuichi Nakamura
The longtime rival of Itagaki Manabu, Imai was the one boxer who managed to thwart Itagaki in his high-school days. They fought a total of three times in the amateur ring; each time Imai was victorious. His build, KO pattern, and even hairstyle are remarkably similar to those of Itagaki's senpai, Makunouchi Ippo. Imai is ordinarily cool and composed, bearing a poker face even in the heat of battle. Eventually, Itagaki defeats Imai in a heated battle. It seems the only people who can rouse him out of this perpetual calm are Ippo, Itagaki, and Itagaki's sister Nanako—with whom Imai is very much smitten.
He recently claimed the Japanese Featherweight Championship belt after a rematch with Itagaki, a title he has yet to defend.

== Kinoshita Gym ==
- Kazuki Sanada (真田 一機, Sanada Kazuki)

Voiced by: Kōichi Yamadera
Handsome and highly intelligent, Sanada's full-time job is as a doctor at the same hospital in which Kumi works. Before moving up to the Featherweight division, he had a very successful reign as the JBC Jr. Featherweight Champion, defending the title five times. He is the pupil of Genji Kamogawa's old nemesis, Hama Dankichi, and in a fight, he uses his immense knowledge of human physical capabilities to predict his opponents' moves. His specialties include two of Dankichi's inventions: the "Hien" (飛燕)—named after a model of highly maneuverable Japanese fight plane, it's an unpredictable left jab known in English as the Swallow—and the "Tsubame Gaeshi", a piercing double uppercut known in English as the Swallow's Return. After his failed attempt to obtain the Featherweight Championship from Ippo, he retires from boxing to continue his work as a doctor. Sanada's character is fairly reminiscent of mid-1980s boxer "The Fighting Physician" Dr. Terry Christle, who had been the Irish national Middleweight champion and chief sparring partner of Marvelous Marvin Hagler during his training for his super fight against Sugar Ray Leonard. Christle had earned his Ph.D at the Royal College of Surgeons in Ireland, but before embarking on a medical career had wanted to give boxing a try, ultimately retiring in 1987. At the time of his retirement, Sanada held a record of 13–2–1 with nine knockouts.

- Takuzo Karasawa (唐沢 拓三, Karasawa Takuzō)

Sanada's kōhai (後輩). After Sanada's retirement from boxing, Karasawa wanted to bring glory back to their gym, and so challenged Ippo for the featherweight championship title. He planned to use his lightning-fast feet to evade the champion's punches and counter the Dempsey roll, but was mercilessly KO'ed in the second round due to Ippo's choice to seal the Dempsey roll and focus on a back-to-the-basics approach on boxing. Was the Rookie King the year before Itagaki and JBC Featherweight 7th Seed at the time he challenged Ippo. (v62 p185)

== Hachinohe Gym ==
- Jason Osma (ジェイソン・尾妻, Jeison Ozuma), United States Army

Voiced by: Masahiro Kobayashi
An African-American soldier stationed in Japan at Misawa Air Base, near Hachinohe, Osma proves a difficult opponent for Ippo in the first round of the Rookie King Tournament. While fearsome in fights, Osma's usual personality is almost unnervingly polite and outgoing. He boxes in order to earn money for his gym, his coach and his training partners, whom he treats like his own family. Osma wields an explosive hook equal even to, if not better than, Takamura's.

- Naomichi Yamada (山田 直道, Yamada Naomichi)

Voiced by: Daisuke Sakaguchi
A bashful young man who first joined the Kamogawa Gym as Ippo's follower. His initial nickname was "Gero-michi" (a Japanese pun based on the fact that he threw up after every part of training). While in public he is awkward and uncomfortable, Naomichi puts everything into his training for his hope for strength and self-confidence. Having had to move away due to his widow mother's work, Naomichi now boxes for a different gym under the alias "Hammer Nao." His specialty, a solar-plexus blow, was created when he challenged his former senpai and current Japanese featherweight champion, Ippo Makunouchi. Although he appears to front a cold personality as "Hammer Nao", he remains a very kind person at heart. He is also blessed with a very good singing voice. Yamada currently holds a record of 8–1–0 with 5 knockouts and is known to fight anywhere between Featherweight and his natural weight class of Junior Welterweight.

== Karil Gym ==
- Ryūhei Sawamura (沢村 竜平, Sawamura Ryūhei)

Voiced by: Shinichirō Miki (Japanese)
A boxer from Nagoya, Sawamura was introduced to boxing by a high school teacher who constantly tried to keep him out of trouble. As a child, he was abandoned by his mother after he attacked her abusive boyfriend with a knife. Sawamura's lust for violence carried over into his boxing career as well, and he shows no remorse for his almost criminal behavior. Nicknamed the "Owari Dragon", Sawamura is very lax about rules in the ring, and will perform illegal moves even if he has an advantage over the other boxer. His specialties include counterpunches and a deadly, twisting jab called the Bullet. He was involved in a car accident the night he won the fight against Ryo Mashiba to become the JBC Jr. Lightweight Champion and retired as champion having 14 fights with a record of 11–3–0 (W–L–D) with 5 KO. According to Sendo, Sawamura has become a trainer in Nagoya.

== Nakadai Gym ==
- Eiji Date (伊達 英二, Date Eiji)

Voiced by: Masaki Aizawa
At an age swiftly approaching thirty, Date is an old-timer for a boxer, but is nevertheless the man that Ippo looks up to. Years ago, he lost his World Title Match to the champion, Ricardo Martinez, who was defending his title for the second time. He was knocked out in the 2nd round, and among other injuries, got a scar on the bridge of his then-fractured nose.
Date gave up boxing after that in order to settle down with his wife Aiko (a woman from a rich family who sacrificed a lot to be with him, and who just had a miscarriage at that time) and raise a family. But Date was a born boxer—he found he could not contain his combative nature for long, and after Aiko told him that she wanted their son Yuuji to see his dad fight, he picked his career back up to the top. Date is strong in every way, but his greatest weapon is the Heartbreak Shot, a corkscrew blow to the heart that immobilizes the opponent. He is the first boxer to have defeated Ippo in the ring after Kamogawa threw the towel.
After this fateful match, Date went after the WBA title—a rematch with Ricardo Martinez, who was making his 18th title defense—but lost by KO in the 10th round. The injuries he received in this fight included broken hands and a fractured jaw, and seriously limited Date's chances of making a return to the ring. He has, however, passed on his dream to Ippo. Currently, he trains other boxers at the Nakadai Gym. Morikawa Jouji stated in an interview that Date was modeled after former OPBF Champion Ozaki Fujio.
At the time of his retirement, Date held a record of 23–2–0 with 17 KOs. He was the former OPBF Featherweight Champion as well as a two-time JBC Featherweight Champion and has twice been the #1 contender to Ricardo Martinez's WBA Featherweight Title.

- Okita Keigo (沖田 佳吾, Okita Keigo)

Voiced by: Hiroaki Hirata
Former Rookie King. Looked up to Date greatly, and tried to emulate him in every respect, going so far as to try to copy his fighting style. Lost to Ippo in the first round of what was billed as a battle of the Rookie Kings. Was Ippo's first fight after winning the Rookie King, jumping him immediately from 10th place, to 5th place, and getting him that much closer to being able to challenge Date for the Title.

== Nihon Gym ==
- Akira Shigeta (茂田 晃, Shigeta Akira)

Voiced by: Hiroyuki Yoshino
Won the Rookie King the year after Ippo. A fake southpaw. Sparred against Ippo before going on to face Sendou in what was Sendo's second title defense. Shigeta fights like a left-handed boxer, which disrupts most boxers because of the lack of left-handed boxers. In reality he is a right-handed boxer, which causes his attacks to be much stronger than they seem (since left-handed boxers tend to fight with the right hand in the front contrary to what right-handed boxers do.) He was destroyed by Sendou, who demonstrated a startling new speed and was forced to retire after the title bout, since the sheer brutality of Sendou's power left him traumatized.

== Other boxers ==
=== Japanese boxers ===
- Yūsuke Oda (小田 祐介, Oda Yūsuke)

Voiced by: Nobutoshi Canna
A handsome boxer with an admittedly unimpressive record of 3–3–0 (3KOs), Oda is Makunouchi Ippo's first opponent in the professional ring. Oda boasts a crushing right straight that easily knocked out his first few opponents; but it was soon revealed, to Coach Mikami's dismay, that he hated to train. Instead, Oda often chose to spend time with his girlfriend—the coach's daughter, Reiko. Later, when he risked losing both Reiko's favor (she had heard how others mocked Oda for losing his fighting will) and the Nishikawa gym's support, Oda threw himself into training and regained the spirit of a boxer. Though he did lose to Ippo, due to the return of his old love for boxing he kept both Reiko's love and the trust of Coach Mikami. It has been revealed that Oda quit boxing after facing Ippo, satisfied with the fight he had. Since then he has felt "a weight lift from his shoulders" and ironically, is now rather obese without the need for weight control.

- Yoshio Fujiwara (藤原 義男, Fujiwara Yoshio)

Voiced by: Fumihiko Tachiki
Fujiwara, an arrogant boxer with a body like a Mack truck and a forehead of stone, is Ippo's second opponent. When he realizes that Ippo is too much for him, he resorts to illegal headbutting to stun the young fighter.

- Takuma Saeki (冴木 卓麻, Saeki Takuma)

Voiced by: Kiyoyuki Yanada
Another amateur boxer turned pro, he was considered an Olympic hopeful while he attended the Toyou College of Athletics. The cheerful, confident Saeki is a skilled outboxer, nicknamed the "Speed Star" for his incredibly quick fists and feet; even Date could not touch him when they sparred. Saeki likes to dazzle his opponents with his fast footwork, then blindside them with volleys of punches. He has recently made a reappearance and will be competing in the upcoming Class-A tournament along with Takuzo Karasawa and even Ippo's kouhai Itagaki.

- Kenta Kobashi (小橋 健太, Kobashi Kenta)

Voiced by: Taiki Matsuno
Kobashi stands as one of the lower key boxers, having entered boxing in the same class and year as Ippo. While both are openly shy and mellow in temperament, Kobashi does not share Ippo's skill as a boxer and resorts to duller tactics to attain victory in the ring. He trains at the Ohtaki Gym. In matches, he is known to throw together simple jabs, footwork, and clinching in a defensive style designed to win on points. Lacking destructive power in his punches, Kobashi has focused on less aggressive boxing and even utilizes a strong cross-arm block to hold superior attackers at bay. He almost defeated Ippo by taking points in the Rookie King Tournament, but was KO'd in the last minute. He is a former JBC Jr. Featherweight Champion, (having defeated Ryuichi Hayami and ending his career), but has since retired without defending once to become a trainer. Incidentally, this is the name of real-life professional wrestler Kenta Kobashi; however, the kanji for his real name is the same while the kanji for his ring name can be seen in the article on the wrestler (as well as the two being shown on the Japanese version thereof).

- Iwao Shimabukuro (島袋 岩男, Shimabukuro Iwao)

Voiced by: Hisao Egawa
Known as the "Ryūkyū Warrior", Shimabukuro hails from a small fishing village in Okinawa and trains at the Okinawa Seaside Gym. Though even shorter than Ippo, his body is like a steel fortress, bulky and cabled with muscle; and his strong lungs enable him to fight without having to breathe for many minutes. He longs to fight with Ippo in a great battle between men of the sea. He was the first challenger to successfully and seriously exploit one of the Dempsey roll's weaknesses.

- Keīchi Take (武 恵一, Take Keīchi)

A crafty, veteran boxer in his early thirties, from the Sameichi Gym in the Fukuoka Prefecture in Kyuushuu. He was ranked the 1st seed in the Featherweight Division when Date was the Champion his first time around. Take had challenged Date for the Championship back then, but had to pull out of the fight to look after his son, Hide, who had become seriously ill. After Hide had recovered, he was bullied because others thought his father was a coward for not fighting Date. Take then returned to the boxing world to fight for his son and had risen to the 1st seed again to challenge Ippo for the Championship. He is also the first southpaw boxer Ippo fights in a professional match. He could be considered a master manipulator and has a boxing style like Aoki. Ippo is able to KO him just 1 minute into the 6th round of Ippo's 7th title defence match.

=== Foreign boxers ===
- (Thailand) Jimmy Sisphar

Voiced by: Masaaki Ōkura
Also known as Scratch J, is a boxer from Thailand who was previously a Muay Thai champion, he has a very powerful right hook. He was the first boxer defeated by Miyata's Jolt Counter, while he was training in Thailand, as part of his travel to gain more experience. Sisphar comes back later in the series with his face full of scars and his speech slurred as Thailand's Featherweight champion to fight Ippo. In the fight, he reveals a devastating new blow that has the destructive power of a Jolt, without actually being a counter, named the Tornado Jolt. However, he loses by KO when Ippo uses a variation of the Dempsey roll that uses an uppercut/smash instead of a hook. Jimmy Sisfer currently holds a record of 38–6 with all 38 wins by knockout and is based on former Junior Bantamweight champion Khaosai Galaxy who had defended his world title 19 times.

- (Russia) Alexander Volg Zangief

Voiced by: Toshiyuki Morikawa
A former Amateur World Champion, Volg is a boxer from Russia who excels at outboxing and taking points, but after he moves to Japan and enters the pro ring, he adopts a vicious infighting style that highlights his signature vertical combination called "White Fang" (a short left uppercut quickly followed by a fast and powerful chopping right). Raised by a single mother in a small town near St. Petersburg, Volg originally enters pro boxing in order to get her medical assistance when she becomes seriously ill (coincidentally, she looks a lot like Hiroko Makunouchi, but with longer and reddish hair). He is kind-hearted and polite, and at first takes little pleasure from using his fists to hurt others—even Ippo notes his sad expression after his victories. He loses his fight in the Class A tournament with Makunouchi because of a lack of killer instinct and stamina, but seeing the determination with which Ippo fought would ignite his passion for boxing. He fights an inspired match with Sendo for the Japanese Featherweight title, but loses in a controversial decision and is forced to leave the Otawa Gym and return to Russia, where he would stay by his mother's side until her death.
Volg keeps a good friendship with Makunouchi and briefly returns to Japan to get his old boxing gloves from Ippo, who he ends up helping for his match with Sawamura. He decides to make a comeback in America, where he is currently training with Dankichi Hama and is now the IBF Junior Lightweight Champion. Since training with Hama, Volg has picked up Hama's 'Hien' technique and successfully combined it with his existing 'White Fang' into a new three-punch combination which has the potential to break through an opponent's closed guard. It is possible that Volg is partly based upon Russian-Australian boxer and former undisputed Light Welterweight champion, Kostya Tszyu who excelled as an amateur in the Soviet boxing program before going on to achieve even greater success as a professional.

- (Thailand) Ponchai Chuwatana

A boxer from Thailand, he is the first to fight Ippo in his comeback after his loss to Eiji Date. Little is known about him, leading Ippo to be nervous before their match. He was also the first boxer knocked down by Ippo's new weapon, the Dempsey roll.

- (Australia) Arnie Gregory

Voiced by: Takaya Kuroda
The former OPBF Featherweight Champion. An Australian boxer nicknamed "The Crocodile", his punches, especially hooks, are very powerful. He also uses a technique against counterpunchers called Bloody Cross. He was the OPBF Champion but lost his title to Miyata. He was KO'd by Miyata's Jolt Counter when Miyata was almost done. He fired his manager, Mr Sakaguchi, before the end of his match with Miyata because of Sakaguchi thinking of boxing as nothing more than a way of making money and thus failing to understand the feelings of the fighters.

- (Mexico) Ricardo Martinez

Voiced by: Masashi Sugawara
The longtime reigning WBA Featherweight Champion, Martinez is considered the only active Super Champion in the world. Having made quick work of Date and sixty other unlucky opponents, Martinez is undefeated and seemingly invincible, as he demonstrated to Ippo in a one-sided sparring match. His strength, speed, ability, and reflexes are almost otherworldly. Martinez is also touted to have "the world's best jab", a jab with no shoulder movement and a very powerful snap. It is, however, implied during his title match with Date, that Martinez and Ippo are equal in punching power. Though he rarely deigns to speak to his opponents, Martinez respects boxers who manage to last more than a round or two against him. The boxer he respects most is Date, as Date pushed him further than anyone else ever had in their rematch. Even so, Martinez's face was not even swollen up from their rematch, whereas Date's injuries were so bad that he had to retire. Martinez currently holds a record of 68–0 with 64 KOs. Martinez's style, demeanor, and career is based on retired world champion Ricardo Lopez, who defended the WBC strawweight title 22 times and is the third champion history to retire undefeated.

- (United States) Bryan Hawk

Voiced by: Akio Ōtsuka
The former WBC Junior Middleweight Champion. A fighter of enormous build, Hawk is detested throughout Japan for his contemptuous attitude towards boxing, often bringing his personal entourage of "Hawk Girls" along to matches and other events. Raised in the toughest parts of New York, Hawk survived with his incredible talent for hand-to-hand violence. He uses unorthodox punches that are very hard to predict, in words of his own coach, Hawk's fighting style is not boxing, it's simply violence. He apparently derives even some degree of sexual pleasure from this violence. He loses the WBC Title to Takamura and retires from boxing due to the injuries received in the match. Like many boxers in the show before he boxed he was a street fighter. He grew up in the most dangerous parts of New York and fought until he was discovered by Miguel Zale, who ran a boxing gym. Bryan Hawk is based on former British featherweight champion "Prince" Naseem Hamed. His resemblance to Hamed includes his upper body swaying, hands down stance, foot and hand speed, flashy boastful attitude, and cutting corners on training. He also resembles former WBC junior middleweight champion Ricardo Mayorga (who was referred to as the "craziest man in boxing"), who is infamous for his hatred of training, wild swinging awkward punches, talent that had stemmed from a violent background, and borderline psychotic attitude.

- (United States) David Eagle

Voiced by: Hidenobu Kiuchi
The former WBC Middleweight Champion, and a fighter the complete opposite of Bryan Hawk in terms of both personality and fighting style. An orthodox hard puncher, he climbed undefeated to the top after only 17 matches, with 15 wins by way of knockout. His level of basic techniques is high and has great concentration due to his vast Olympic and amateur experience, where he was also undefeated. Eagle's greatest weapon is a highly polished one-two, which Takamura even admits is of the highest class in terms of power and delivery, as well as a great fighting spirit, that Takamura recognizes as one as great as Ippo's (The exact words were: "You know, Ippo? This guy looks just like you"). Eagle is pleasant and easygoing outside the ring, and shows excellent sportsmanship inside it. He loses his belt to Takamura.

- (Philippines) Randy Boy Jr.

The former OPBF Interim Featherweight Champion who holds a victory over the Philippines Featherweight national champion and fellow countryman, Malcolm Gedoh. He is the son of Randy "Racoon" Boy, the boxer that forced Miyata Ichiro's father to retire from boxing. Because of this, Miyata decided to break his promise to Ippo by turning down their promised match in order to fight Randy Boy Jr. Like his father, Boy Jr. is a "Switch Hitter", an ambidextrous boxer who can smoothly switch stances from orthodox to southpaw during a match. His style has also given him the ring name "Asura" because of his ability to "go" and "see" anywhere in the ring. His switching is said nullify outboxers and counter punchers, because it creates a "static" that disrupts the rhythm and timing of outboxers. He is aiming to defeat Ricardo Martinez to become World Champion. It is revealed before his fight with Ichiro Miyata that his father died of brain damage he sustained after the fight with Miyata's father when he continued to box in a world title bout. He was beaten by Miyata after an intense fight which angered his manager to the point of nullifying their contract.

- (Indonesia) Papaya Dachiu

The lightweight champion of Indonesia who is noticed for his particularly odd-looking hairstyle. He fights using a lot of tricks, just like Aoki. His specialty punch is a tremendously powerful right straight called the Coconut Punch. He strengthens his right arm for his rematch with Aoki, making his Coconut Punch even more powerful. Papaya's weakness is a critical lack of stamina, which Aoki exploits in both of his fights with Papaya. Aoki has fought Papaya twice, with both matches ending in a draw.

- (Philippines) Eleki Battery

The junior lightweight champion of the Philippines, Eleki also boasts an odd hairstyle with a lightning bolt shaved on top of his head. He is a skilled outboxer like Kimura. Eleki's weakness was his exceptionally weak body. He toughened up his body for his rematch with Kimura. Kimura has fought Eleki twice, with both matches ending in a draw.

- Malcolm Gedoh: The reigning Philippines Featherweight national champion, a crooked fighter who offers to fix his fights in exchange for prize money. Prior to becoming a boxer, Malcolm stole money on the streets and it led to him getting shot and scarred on the shoulder. He is known as "The Magician" for the tricks he uses inside of the ring, such as the use his long arms to block one's vision while using good his footwork to get away from his opponent. Another trick is how he throws off an opponent's depth perception by loosening the strings on his left glove so that it flings off his unclenched fist, making his reach seem even longer. He managed to take Makunouchi to Round 8, which is further than any other opponent has taken Ippo. He was Ippo's last opponent, losing the fight after he is hit by a flurry of hooks and a powerful uppercut which sends him off his feet. After the fight with Ippo, Malcolm later confessed that his loss to Randy Boy Jr. led him to give up his world aspirations and box only for the money rather than competition.
- (Indonesia) Woli

A boxing prodigy, Woli is the current Indonesian national champion, a title he won at the age of seventeen in just his third fight. He was discovered by famous boxing trainer Miguel Zail, the man who discovered Bryan Hawk. Before boxing, he was just an island man who played with the monkeys which helped him gain superb speed, reflexes and agility. In some respects, his style similar to Hawk in that he prefers a lowered guard, defending with a fast sway while throwing unorthodox and instinctive punches. Despite his lack of experience in both the pro and amateur ring, he has intuitively mastered various techniques including the Smash, flicker jab and creative uses of the ropes. His relaxed, almost playful demeanor in the ring allows him to instantly find more inspired ways to box. After sparring with him, Volg states he will soon be world famous and Zail believes he'll eventually be in the history books. Woli has a record of 3–1 with three KOs. His first loss came in his recent fight with Ippo, since Miguel threw the towel to avoid a KO.

- (South Korea) Yi Yonsu

A Korean boxer who when he moved to Japan, grabbed the 5th rank in one fight, and challenged Ippo next. In what was Ippos 3rd title defense. The fight took place right before Takamura claimed the world title. Yonsu lost to Ippo in just 32 seconds. A 1 round KO.

- (United States) Mike Elliot

The former IBF Junior Lightweight Champion. A boxer with a well-rounded skill set, Elliot is a calculating ring tactician who approaches his matches like a chess match, with the goal of outsmarting and methodically breaking down his opponents. As an amateur, he won a bronze medal for the United States at the Olympics but his loss in the Olympic finals, where an opponent's sloppy brawling undid Elliot's cerebral style, motivated him to seek out challengers that could equal his ring intellect as a professional. He loses his IBF title against Volg; after getting hit by Volgs Hien/Fang combo, he loses his tactical advantage and the fight devolves into a desperate brawl which Volg barely wins.

- (Mexico) Alfredo Gonzales

The #2 ranked boxer in the WBC Featherweight class, and a rival of Ricardo Martinez who has lost to twice. Gonzales grew up on the streets and originally had a very vicious style, but as he trained as a boxer began to develop a more technical style. However, he still uses his more violent style in certain situations. Gonzales longs for a rematch against Ricardo Martinez, and was angry at the idea of Ippo getting to challenge Ricardo in his place during their fight. Despite strong fighting from Ippo, Gonzales ultimately proved the victor.

== Other characters ==
- Kazuo Makunouchi (幕之内 一男, Makunouchi Kazuo)

Voiced by: Masaki Terasoma
Ippo's deceased father. Not much is known about his past other than he was a fisherman who loved to get into fights, and that he had a powerful punch. He died when Ippo was much younger, saving his friend Sakuma in a storm. Ippo's mother said that Kazuo was more suited to be a boxer than Ippo was. In a flashback in volume 56, Kazuo said Ippo was weak and he was going to "train" him. It is unknown what training he was planning to put Ippo through. It is through his strategy that Ippo beat Miyata (When Kazuo was to fight a stronger opponent, he would picture his opponent as a fish and all the tension would go away). He also won his match against Iwao Shimabukuro with the same strategy.

- Hiroko Makunouchi (幕之内 寛子, Makunouchi Hiroko)

Voiced by: Yorie Terauchi
Hiroko is Ippo's widowed mother. She is a very kind and strong willed woman who cares for her son a great deal. She started running the fishing business after her husband, Kazuo, died after saving his friend Sakuma. Though she refuses to attend any of Ippo's matches because she does not want to watch him get hurt, she supports his boxing wholeheartedly because she knows how much joy it has brought to his life and how it has helped him with his self-esteem. Since Kazuo's death, Ippo and Hiroko have been more or less alone in the world; so the strength of their family bond is no surprise.

- Kumi Mashiba (間柴 久美, Mashiba Kumi)

Voiced by: Sanae Kobayashi, Yuka Hirata (New Challenger), Saori Hayashi (Rising)
Kumi is Ryo Mashiba's sweet-natured, but hard-working and willful younger sister, and as such understands him better than anyone else. She will do almost anything to support her brother and make him happy, including going to his matches even though she does not like to see him get hurt. Ippo becomes infatuated with her early on, but did not have a chance to tell her until more than a year later, when they met in an hospital as patient and nurse some months after the Ippo/Mashiba ring. They become friends and Kumi comes to like Ippo back, but their relationship tends to suffer from their friends' and relatives' constant interference, and also was somewhat strained after Ippo thought she was smitten with Dr. Sanada, until Kumi herself clarified the mistake after their match but did not get a chance to say that Ippo was the one she really loved. Kumi tends to be modest and shy, but she will stand up for her brother and friends at a moment's notice.

- Ginpachi Nekota (猫田 銀八, Nekota Ginpachi)

Voiced by: Ichirō Nagai (2009–2013), Kōichi Yamadera (Rising, ep. 22–25), Hiroyuki Yoshino (young)
Making his home a lonely shack up in the mountain forests, Nekota is Kamogawa's best friend of over fifty years. Occasionally, Kamogawa will visit him in the mountains, once taking Ippo and the others there to train for upcoming fights. While a meddling old geezer who tends to overstay his welcome, he is nonetheless loyal, good-hearted and trustworthy to the boys at the Kamogawa Gym. Nekota proved a far greater technical boxer than even Kamogawa; but as a result of their constant spars, he developed the beginning stages of punch-drunk syndrome. Despite this condition, Nekota took it upon himself to challenge an arrogant American military officer, Ralph Anderson, in a boxing match to boost Japanese morale. Though Nekota had the upper hand, Anderson won by throwing an illegal rabbit punch, which resulted in permanent mid-brain damage.

- Yuki (ユキ)

Voiced by: Fumiko Orikasa
A beautiful young woman who adored sunflowers. Yuki met Kamogawa and Nekota at a boxing match in the 1950s. Smitten, they offered to put her up at Kamogawa's house to protect her from American soldiers. It was soon revealed, however, that Yuki was a victim of radiation poisoning from the American bombing of Hiroshima, and that she had come to Tokyo in hopes of living out her last days in happiness. When Nekota left Tokyo to live in the mountains, Yuki went with him; Kamogawa asked her to take care of his now-impaired best friend. Although—or perhaps because—Yuki had fallen in love with Kamogawa, she spent the rest of her life in the mountains with Nekota as per his request, dying peacefully some time later.

- Dankichi Hama (浜 団吉, Hama Dankichi)

Voiced by: Seizō Katō
A former friend and rival of Kamogawa and Nekota. In his younger days, Hama boxed along with the two, but never managed to reach their level, partially due to his unusually fragile jaw. Nevertheless, he is a brilliant tactician who, since having left Japan for Mexico, is renowned for his successful training of several champions, including Sanada Kazuki. Hama still harbors deep feelings of rivalry towards Kamogawa, and strives to one day train a boxer that can defeat Makunouchi or Takamura. He is currently the trainer of Alexander Volg Zangief in America.

- Masahiko Umezawa (梅沢 正彦, Umezawa Masahiko)

Voiced by: Mitsuaki Madono
A classmate of Ippo's, Umezawa was the leader of a group of students who would regularly bully him. Together with his two flunkies, he made a habit of beating Ippo up, until the day that Takamura stopped him. After an initial failure to confront the fledgling boxer, Umezawa soon began to cheer Ippo on in his matches, and eventually took a job at the Makunouchi family fishing business to help out when Ippo's mother became ill. His ultimate goal, however, is to become a manga artist, and he eventually left his job to pursue it. In spite of all they went through in high school, the two are now the best of friends.

- Minoru Fujī (藤井 稔, Fujī Minoru)

Voiced by: Kenichi Ono
A reporter for a boxing magazine that has been following Ippo's career since his fights with Miyata. Occasionally he drops by with information concerning opposing fighters in upcoming matches for the Kamogawa gym members.

- Mari Īmura (飯村 真理, Īmura Mari)

Voiced by: Emi Shinohara
A 23-year-old sportswriter who works alongside Fujii. Iimura's calm indifference and sharp wit serve often to put off those who would judge her only for beauty, but she is an avid boxing fan and, though less experienced than some, an outstanding journalist.

- Nanako Itagaki (板垣 菜々子, Itagaki Nanako)

Voiced by: Yū Kobayashi
Manabu Itagaki's younger sister. A flirtatiously joyful girl, Nanako is 16 years old and extremely interested in boys, harboring a particular taste for fighting men. She develops a crush on Ippo shortly after Itagaki introduces them, and finds herself competing with Kumi and Iimura for his attention.

- Yamaguchi-sensei (山口先生)

Voiced by: Yuko Kobayashi
A young female doctor whom Ippo asks for help after his match with Ryo Mashiba, since he sustained a serious injury during the fight but still wished to stay true to his promise to face Sendou. She develops a training menu to allow him to train and fight without causing excessive strain on his damaged bones. Yamaguchi is a very attractive woman with a beautiful and well-developed body, which at times distracts Ippo's friends (especially Takamura) from practice; but when her skills are needed, her efficiency and professional manner are admirable. Yamaguchi is also an expert in judo.

- Mr. Sakaguchi

Voiced by: Minoru Inaba
A boxing promoter for the OPBF. He has a personal vendetta against Miyata for defeating his champion client Arnie Gregory. He is currently promoting Randy Boy Jr. as part of his revenge. He is short, high strung, and greatly resembles an Asian Don King. His nationality is unknown, but he can speak fluent English. Even his own boxers seem to dislike him as shown by Arnie firing him and Randy constantly ignoring him or telling him off. After Randy's loss to Ichiro Miyata, Sakaguchi nullified their contract. Shortly after Takamura's title defense the same night he accidentally struck Sakaguchi (who he thought was responsible for his less than stellar defense) and Sakaguchi has since stated that he will never return to Japan. Mr. Sakaguchi possesses some of the same mannerisms, personality traits, and even haircut as promoter Don King.

- Suguru Takamura (鷹村卓, Takamura Suguru)

Voiced by: Kenyuu Horiuchi
An older brother of Mamoru Takamura and a former Rugby Team member. In the midst of his defeat, his brother was kick-out to high school. Suguru see his brother again and said to him "if you defeat Bryan Hawk, I will give you a company and I will congratulate you if you a world champion."

== Animals ==
- Hachi (ハチ; lit. eight): Hachi is Nekota's pet dog. He is a very friendly dog that goes wherever Nekota does. Nekota even snuck him into Korakuen Hall for Ippo's title fight against Sendo.
- Wanpo (ワンポ; lit. one punch): Wanpo is one of Hachi's sons. Nekota gave him to Ippo soon after Ippo won the Japanese Featherweight Championship. His name is a combination of English and Japanese to form a pun on Ippo's name, which literally means "one step". One pronounced using Japanese syllables is Wan (ワン, One).
- Mountain Bear: While training at Nekota's place in the mountains, the Kamogawa troop were told to be wary of bears. When Takamura was out jogging once, he encountered a bear that he was able to KO after a life-threatening fight. He lets the bear go once he sees that it has two bear cubs following it. Nekota then later came upon the bear in its weakened state and shoots it to make a bear meat nabe that Takamura said he wanted to try, though Takamura was outraged when he found out. However, he decides to eat all the bear meat out of respect for the animal. Nekota later gave the bearskin pelt to Takamura, who fashioned an unusual ring robe out of it.
- Reiko (れいこ): An arowana fish that Kimura keeps in his room. The fish is apparently named after the girl Kimura liked when he went on the group date with the girls from the hospital. Unfortunately for Kimura, she did not return the feelings. It was the jumping this fish would perform when fed that led Kimura to develop his "Dragon Fish Blow" he used in his title fight against Ryō Mashiba.
