= Daiki Kasho =

Japanese video game composer (born 1976)

- Born: November 2, 1976 (age 49); Tokyo, Japan
- Genres: Film and television scores, video game scores, rock
- Occupations: Composer, arranger, musician
- Years active: 1999–present
- Website: Daiki Kasho

Daiki Kasho (嘉生 大樹, Kashou Daiki; born November 2, 1976), stylized as daiki kasho, is a Japanese video game composer best known for his contributions to the Gran Turismo series of racing games by Polyphony Digital. He has also previously worked on the F-Zero, Wangan Midnight, and King of Fighters series.

Kasho first joined Sony Computer Entertainment after he got an invitation from a friend, but subsequently left the company prior to the release of Gran Turismo 3: A-Spec. Despite leaving, he continued to collaborate with Polyphony Digital in the sound department. Kasho has worked with Polyphony Digital since 1999.

== Works ==
Video games
Year	Title	Role(s)	Ref.
1999	Alundra 2	Sound effects	
1999	Gran Turismo 2	Sound designer	
1999	Omega Boost	Music with Shingo Okumura	
2000	Bealpareth	Sound effects	
2001	Gran Turismo 3: A-Spec	Sound designer, music	
2001	Phase Paradox	Sound designer, music	
2002	Gran Turismo Concept	Music	
2002	Tokyo Xtreme Racer 3	Music	
2002	Wangan Midnight (PS2)	"Hit It!"	
2003	F-Zero GX	Music with Hidenori Shoji	
2003	Gran Turismo 4 Prologue	Music	
2003	Tokyo Xtreme Racer: Drift	Music	
2004	Gran Turismo 4	Music	
2004	Kaidō Battle 2: Chain Reaction	Music	
2005	Tokyo Xtreme Racer: Drift 2	Music	
2006	Gran Turismo HD Concept	Music	
2007	Gran Turismo 5 Prologue	Music	
2010	Gran Turismo 5	Music	
2013	Gran Turismo 6	Music	
2017	Gran Turismo Sport	Sound designer, music	
2022	Gran Turismo 7	Sound designer, music	

Film/anime
Year	Title	Role(s)	Ref.
2005	The King of Fighters: Another Day	Main theme "Regret Another Day"	
2006	Le Chevalier D'Eon	Main theme "OVER NIGHT"	
2021	Blue Reflection Ray	Opening theme "DiViNE"	
2021	World's End Harem	Ending theme "ENDiNG MiRAGE"	

== Discography ==
=== Video games ===
"5OUL ON D!SPLAY" was originally an untitled song for the Gran Turismo 5 E3 2010 Trailer, but was later given its name through a competition held by Polyphony Digital by online user MajanoX.

Title	Original		
Title	Released	Personnel	Featured In
"Tense Up"	1999	Daiki Kasho – arranger; Shingo Okumura – composer, arranger	Omega Boost
"Glowl"	2001	Daiki Kasho – composer, arranger	Gran Turismo 3: A-Spec; Gran Turismo Concept
"Mirage"	2001	Daiki Kasho – composer, arranger	Gran Turismo 3: A-Spec; Gran Turismo Concept
"Obscure"	2001	Daiki Kasho – composer, arranger	Gran Turismo 3: A-Spec; Gran Turismo Concept
"Sky Scraper"	2001	Daiki Kasho – composer, arranger	Gran Turismo 3: A-Spec; Gran Turismo Concept
"Strike Breaker"	2001	Daiki Kasho – composer, arranger	Gran Turismo 3: A-Spec; Gran Turismo Concept
"Continuation"	2002	Daiki Kasho – arranger	Gran Turismo Concept; Gran Turismo 4 Prologue; Gran Turismo 6 Gran Turismo 7
"TURBO"	2002	Daiki Kasho – arranger	Gran Turismo Concept; Gran Turismo 4 Prologue; Gran Turismo 6 Gran Turismo 7
"Heaven"	2002	Daiki Kasho – arranger	Gran Turismo Concept; Gran Turismo 4 Prologue; Gran Turismo 7
"Running in the Dark"	2002	Daiki Kasho – arranger; Chiaki – vocals; Alan Brey – lyrics, arranger	Tokyo Xtreme Racer 3
"Hit It"	2002		Wangan Midnight (PS2)
"Please"	2003	Daiki Kasho - composer; Arvin Homa Aya – vocals, lyrics; Motoya Shiraishi – producer	Tokyo Xtreme Racer: Drift
'2/K"	2003		Gran Turismo 4 Prologue; Gran Turismo 6
"Break Down"	2004	Daiki Kasho – music; Chiaki – vocals; Alan Brey – music, lyrics; Tasuku – arranger	Gran Turismo 4 Prologue; Gran Turismo 4 Gran Turismo Sport; Gran Turismo 7
"Good Days Bad Days"	2004	Daiki Kasho – music; Alan Brey – vocals, lyrics	Gran Turismo 4 Prologue; Gran Turismo 4 Gran Turismo 6 Gran Turismo Sport; Gran Turismo 7
"It's All About You"	2004	Daiki Kasho – music; Chiaki – vocals; Alan Brey – music, lyrics; Kansei Miyagi – guitar; Rui Watanabe – drums	Gran Turismo 4 Gran Turismo 6 Gran Turismo Sport; Gran Turismo 7
"My Precious"	2004	Daiki Kasho – music	Gran Turismo 4
"Soul Surfer"	2004	Daiki Kasho – music; Chiaki – vocals; Alan Brey – lyrics; Tasuku – arranger	Gran Turismo 4 Gran Turismo Sport; Gran Turismo 7
"What to Believe"	2004	Daiki Kasho – music; Chiaki – vocals; Alan Brey – vocals, lyrics; Tasuku – arranger	Gran Turismo 4 Prologue; Gran Turismo 4 Gran Turismo 6 Gran Turismo Sport; Gran Turismo 7
"Wicked"	2004	Daiki Kasho – music; Chiaki - vocals; Alan Brey – lyrics	Gran Turismo 4 Gran Turismo Sport; Gran Turismo 7
"Find Your Dream"	2004	Arvin Homa Aya – vocals, lyrics	Kaidō Battle 2: Chain Reaction
"Call Me Now"	2005		Tokyo Xtreme Racer: Drift 2
"Autoload"	2006		Gran Turismo HD Concept
"EDGE OF THE WORLD"	2007	Daiki Kasho – music, programming, instruments, engineering; Jon Underdown – vocals, lyrics	Gran Turismo 5 Prologue; Gran Turismo 6 Gran Turismo 7
"FLOW"	2007	Jon Underdown – vocals	Gran Turismo 5 Prologue; Gran Turismo 7
"SURV1V3"	2007	Daiki Kasho – music, programming, instruments, engineering; Jon Underdown – vocals; Ayesha Cole – lyrics	Gran Turismo 5 Prologue; Gran Turismo 6 Gran Turismo 7
"5OUL ON D!SPLAY"	2010	Daiki Kasho – music, programming, instruments; Jon Underdown – vocals, lyrics; MajanoX - name	Gran Turismo 5 Gran Turismo 6 Gran Turismo Sport; Gran Turismo 7
"Day To Live"	2010	Daiki Kasho – music, programming, instruments; Jon Underdown – vocals, lyrics	Gran Turismo 5 Gran Turismo 6 Gran Turismo Sport; Gran Turismo 7
"Shadows Of Our Past"	2010	Daiki Kasho - music; Jon Underdown – vocals, lyrics	Gran Turismo 5 Gran Turismo Sport; Gran Turismo 7
"AL1V3"	2013	Erik Gregory - vocals	Gran Turismo 6 Gran Turismo Sport; Gran Turismo 7
"All my life"	2013	Ray Hikari – vocals	Gran Turismo 6 Gran Turismo Sport; Gran Turismo 7
"Looking for you"	2013	Erik Gregory - vocals	Gran Turismo 6 Gran Turismo Sport; Gran Turismo 7
"Place in this world"	2013	Ray Hikari – vocals	Gran Turismo 6 Gran Turismo Sport; Gran Turismo 7
"We are one"	2013	Erik Gregory - vocals	Gran Turismo 6 Gran Turismo 7

=== Credits in music ===
Kasho is also credited as a producer in EXiNA's 2022 album SHiENA.

Year	Title	Artist	Album	Credits
2008	"Break Away"	fade	To Find A Better Tomorrow	Musician
2012	"WAKE UP THE WORLD"	fade	Ten	Musician
2022	"CARPET"	EXiNA	SHiENA	Composer and arranger
2022	"ENDiNG MiRAGE"	EXiNA	SHiENA	Composer and arranger

=== Credits in television ===
Year	Title	Artist	Film/anime	Credits
2005	"Regret Another Day"	Dakota Star	The King of Fighters: Another Day	Composer
2006	"OVER NIGHT"	Aya	Le Chevalier D'Eon	Composer and arranger
