= Nissan Sileighty =

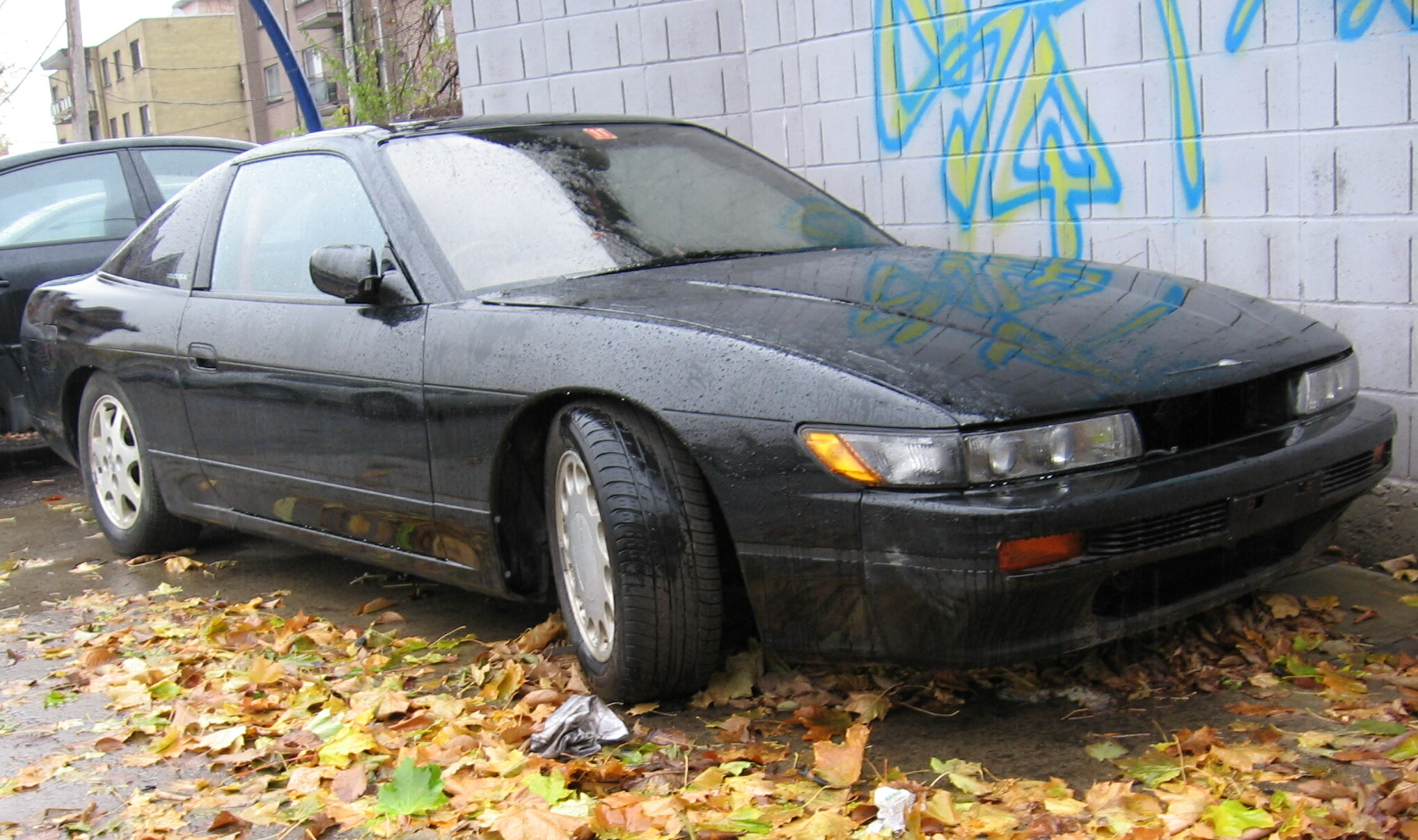
- An unofficial Sileighty using a 180SX body and an S13 Silvia front-end

Overview
- Manufacturer: Nissan (Note: The Sileighty is not an official model produced by Nissan themselves, but rather as an unofficial model created by enthusiasts based on a modified Nissan 180SX; the official Sileighty models were produced by Kid's Heart for Nissan.)
- Also called: Nissan Onevia (Note: The Onevia refers to a modified Nissan Silvia S13 with a 180SX front-end, which is an unofficial model worldwide but as an official model in North America as the S13 240SX coupe.)
- Production: 1989–1998 (Note: Sileighty models produced by Kid's Heart were all made in 1998)
- Assembly: Japan (Note: Sileighty models produced by Kid's Heart were manufactured at the Kid's Heart Co., Ltd. (Sileighty Business Division) tuning shop in Kitanagoya City, Aichi.)

Body and chassis
- Class: Sports car
- Body style: 2-door coupé (Onevia); 3-door fastback/hatchback (Sileighty)
- Layout: Front-engine, rear-wheel-drive
- Platform: Nissan S platform
- Related: Nissan Silvia (S13); Nissan 180SX; Nissan 200SX (Europe); Nissan 240SX (North America)

Powertrain
- Engine: 1.8 L CA18DET turbo I4; 2.0 L SR20DE I4; 2.0 L SR20DET turbo I4
- Transmission: 4-speed automatic 5-speed manual

Dimensions
- Wheelbase: 2,475 mm (97 in)
- Length: 4,480 mm (176 in) (Sileighty); 4,520–4,540 mm (178–179 in) (Onevia)
- Width: 1,690 mm (67 in)
- Height: 1,290 mm (51 in)
- Curb weight: 1,170–1,270 kg (2,579–2,800 lb)

The Sileighty (シルエイティ) is a name given to a Nissan 180SX that uses the front-end assembly of the S13 Silvia while retaining the fastback body style of the former, creating an unofficial hatchback version of a car that was never officially offered by Nissan.

A related model, the Onevia (ワンビア), refers to an S13 Silvia with a 180SX front-end, which was never officially sold in Japan and other parts of the world except in North America, which was sold as the coupe and convertible version of the 240SX for that region.

== Name ==
Most of the information in this article was translated from the Nissan Sileighty article on Japanese Wikipedia at ja:日産・シルエイティ.

Sileighty (or written as "Sil80") is a portmanteau of "Silvia" (the front half) and "180SX" (One-Eighty, the rear half), referring to the two halves of the cars that are used to create the vehicle. Conversely, the reverse is true for "Onevia", which stands for "180SX" (One-Eighty, the front half) and "Silvia" (the rear half).

Though the name was used by enthusiasts to refer to the Silvia-180SX combination (the same is true for Onevia, the nickname for the 180SX-Silvia combination), Nissan never referred to these modified vehicles as the Sileighty (owing the fact that they are still known as 180SX), however they did apply for a trademark in 1998 when Japanese tuning company Kid's Heart supplied several Sileighty vehicles to Nissan, making it somewhat an official name.

== History ==
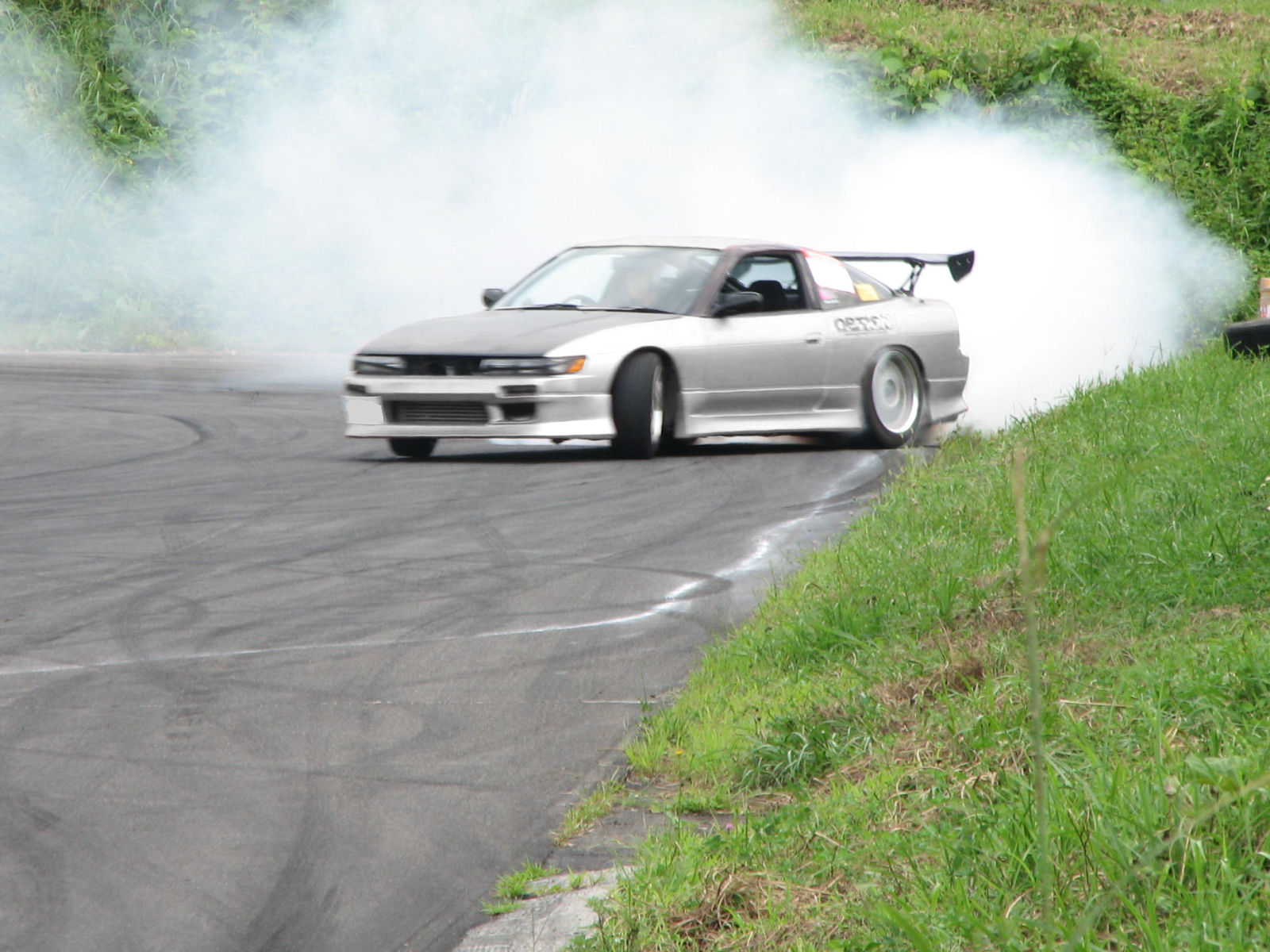
A Sileighty drifting at a 2006 D1GP event during a practice run

The Sileighty originated from Japanese hashiriya (street racers in Japanese) who had 180SXs with damaged front-ends during races or practice runs. Due to the high costs on 180SX front-end replacements at the time (as well as their slightly heavier nature due to the retractable headlight system), many of them would use the S13 Silvia front-end assembly instead (which had fixed relampable headlights) as a cost-saving and weight-reducing measure.

The earliest documented example of these modifications was showcased on the August 1989 edition of Option in its "TEST on ROAD" section where a relatively new 4-speed automatic equipped 180SX with some mods (e.g. boost upgrades) was outfitted with the front-end of an S13 Silvia by a tuning shop in Tokyo. This modification was therefore dubbed as the "Silvia 180SX", the precursor to the Sileighty name.

Nissan released the successor to the S13 Silvia in late 1993, known as the S14 Silvia, which had a radically different body style compared to its predecessor. Due to the larger width dimensions, its release was hampered by higher road taxes for Japanese buyers imposed by the Japanese government regulations for vehicle body size, and parts compatibility was low due to the redesigned internals and externals. As a result, most street racers stuck with the S13 Silvia and 180SX; at this time, modifying a 180SX with an S13 Silvia front-end started becoming popular among certain groups, and thus the Sileighty name was born.

At the same time, some street racers modified an S13 Silvia to use the 180SX front-end assembly, dubbed as the Onevia, however this did not achieve the same popularity as the Sileighty due to their heavy nature regarding the use of retractable headlights, the still-costly nature of the front-end assemblies, as well as it being considered "ugly" by most if not all owners; the Onevia as a result was relegated into complete obscurity by those who wanted the notchback coupe version of the 180SX. However, Nissan in North America did offer a coupe model for their domestic version of the 180SX, the 240SX, which simply transplants the 240SX's front-end onto the body of an S13 Silvia; this model is not to be confused with the Onevia modification produced by Japanese street racers in their home region as it predates the creation of said modification by a few years and was sold as early as 1989 when the 240SX launched in North America.

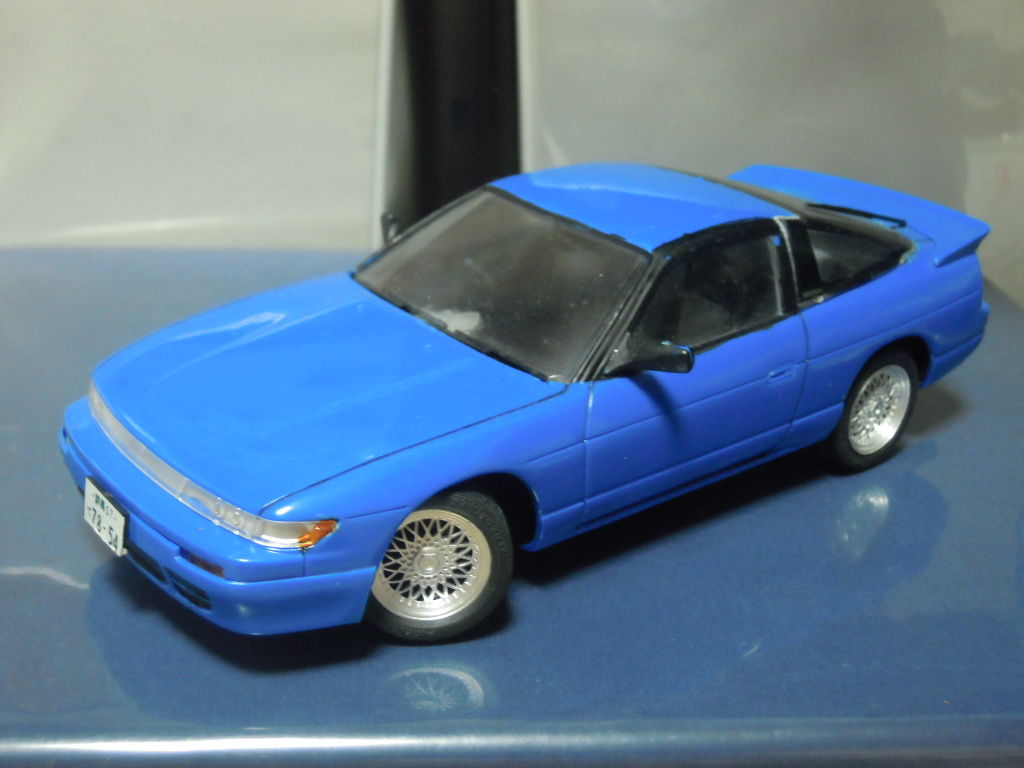
A model car of a Sileighty based on its appearance in Initial D

The Sileighty made its mark in popular culture when it was featured in Initial D, where it was featured as the car driven by Impact Blue drivers Mako Sato and her navigator Sayuki during the first few chapters in the manga and in the First Stage anime; the Sileighty made further appearances in video game series such as Gran Turismo (where it was featured as the unofficial model based on the one in Initial D in the first two games as well as the Kid's Heart version in later games), and Tokyo Xtreme Racer (where the Sileighty appeared in Tokyo Xtreme Racer: Zero, Tokyo Xtreme Racer: Drift and Tokyo Xtreme Racer: Drift 2 and the Onevia appearing exclusively in Drift 2). Its appearance in Motor Magazine Ltd.'s Holiday Auto magazine as well as in Tomy's Tomica model car line (Note: Dedicated models of the Sileighty were never sold by Tomica themselves; they were mostly produced for special edition sets such as those for Initial D. However, there were limited edition silver-plated versions of the Sileighty in the "Tomica Limited" line as well as singular editions released in limited quantities; they were also released under the high-end "Tomica Premium" brand.) also helped with its cultural recognition.

The Sileighty also spawned off a parody vehicle featured on Option known as the "Nissan Celeighty" (日産・セルエイティ), featuring a literal cut and shut (or nikoichi (ニコイチ), meaning "two-in-one" in Japanese) vehicle created by welding the front-ends of a Toyota Celsior (Japanese model of the Lexus LS 400) onto another car; this car also appeared in Atsushi Arino's manga, Otoko Touge.

=== Kid's Heart Sileighty ===
Japanese tuning company Kid's Heart released a limited number of Sileighty vehicles for sale in Nissan dealerships (as well as from the tuning company themselves) on May 1, 1998, with about 500 units being produced. Built on the late model ("Kouki") 180SX, engine choices were the naturally aspirated SR20DE and the turbocharged SR20DET, with the same 140 or 205 PS (103 or 151 kW; 138 or 202 hp) as the 180SX. A five-speed manual or a four-speed automatic were available. Trim levels were Type X, Type R, Type S and Type G, the same as the 180SX, with the Type X and Type R receiving the SR20DET and the Type S and Type G receiving the SR20DE. Standard equipment included N1-spec headlights, a fin-type grille, OEM Aero Form bumpers, side skirts, and badges reading "专用" (meaning "dedicated" in Japanese) on the front fenders and the rear. A custom "Sileighty" wording replaces the "180SX" name on the taillight housing and the rear quarter panel windows. A NISMO-built limited-slip differential (LSD), a revised suspension system with stiffer springs and ECU tuning were also included as an option, with the latter bumping up power outputs of the turbo engine to 230 PS (169 kW; 227 hp) at 13 psi (0.9 bar) of boost. Color choices were Yellow, Spark Silver Metallic, Midnight Purple Pearl, Super Black, and White.

Nissan subsequently trademarked the Sileighty name for use with the Kid's Heart Sileighty models (with registration number 5118200), making it an "official" model under the Sileighty name despite the cars still being known as the 180SX owing to its body style.

== Overview ==
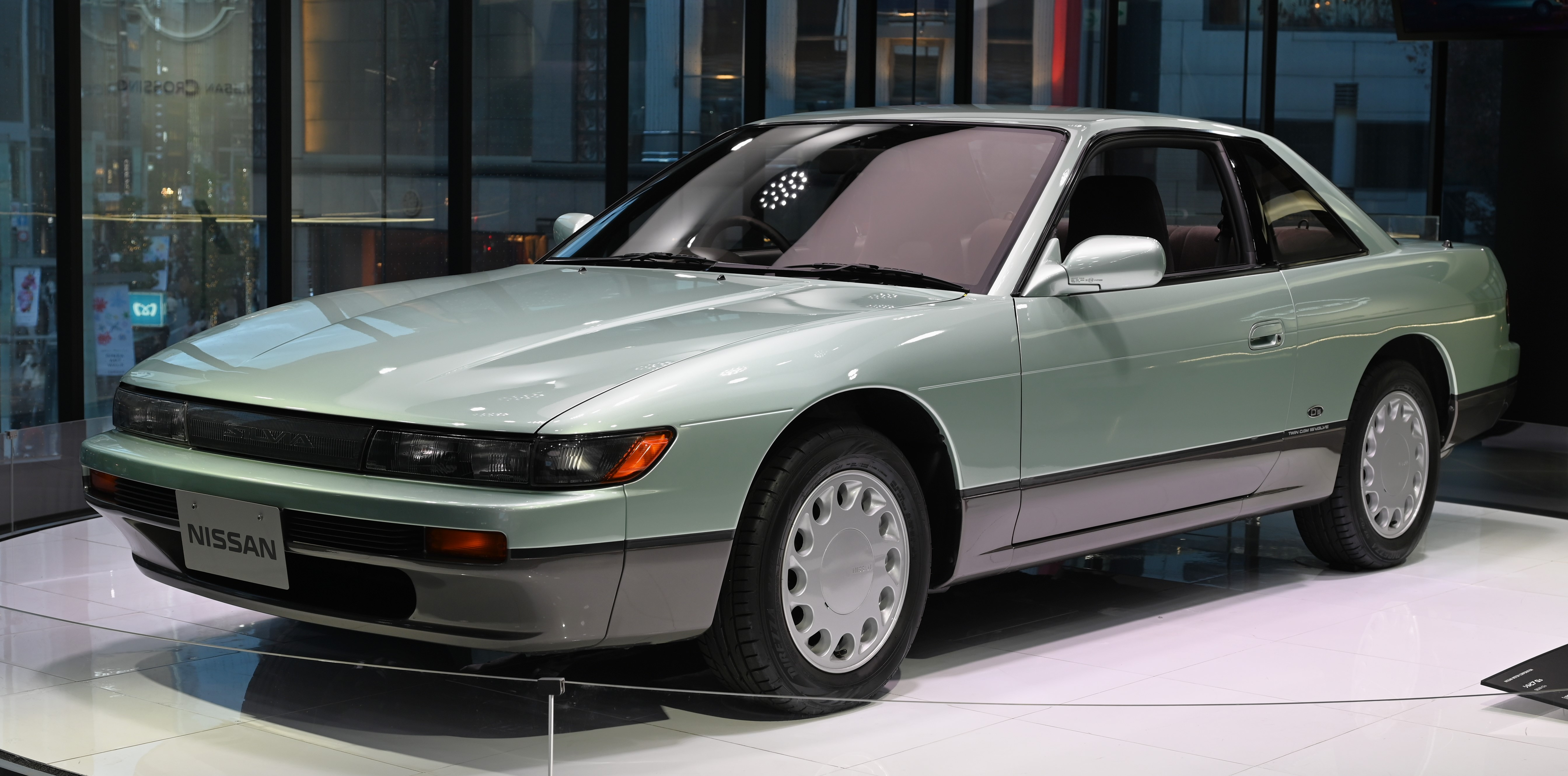
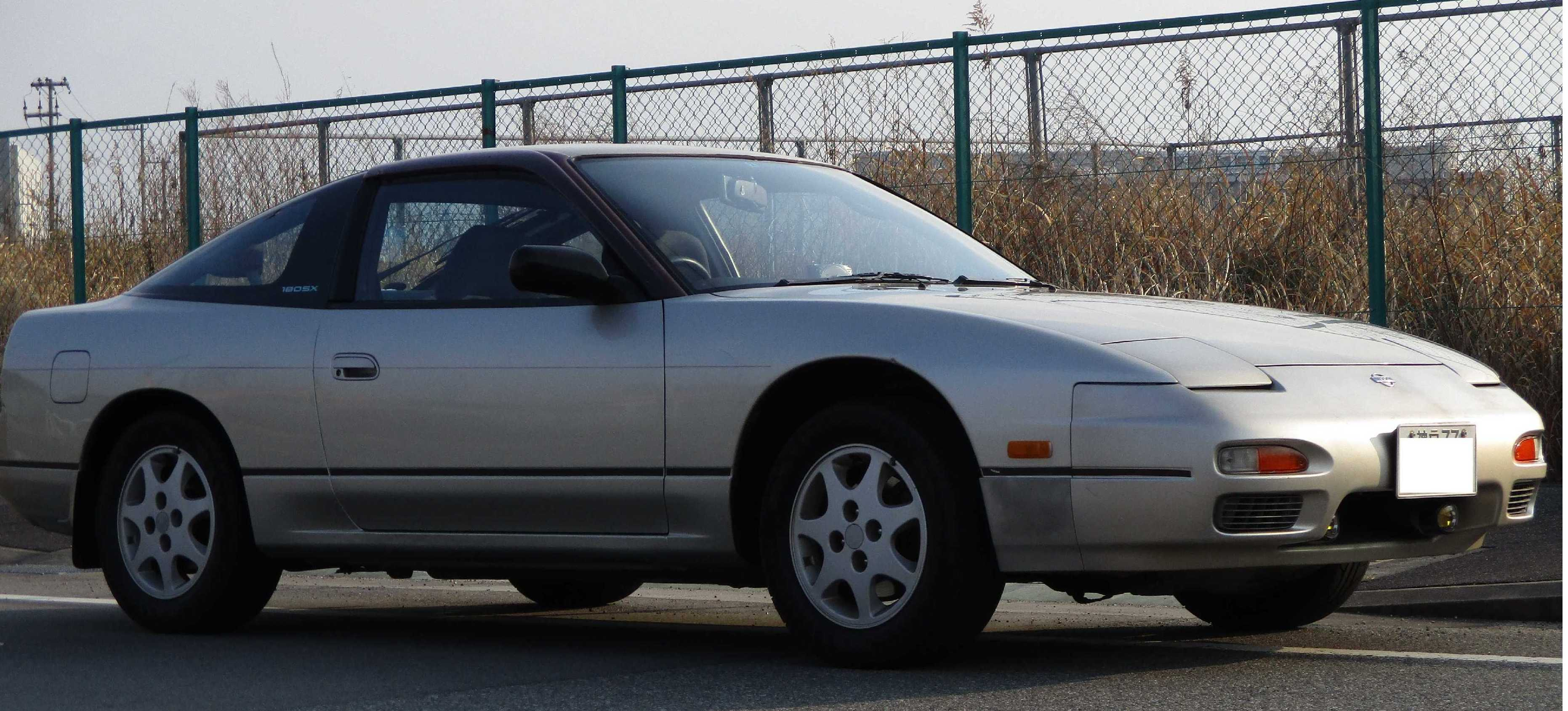
The S13-chassis Nissan Silvia and 180SX, which were used as the base for the Sileighty

Due to the fact that the S13 Silvia and 180SX share the same chassis, parts interchangeability between the two cars is high. This means that many of the components such as the engines, brakes, suspensions, etc., can be used interchangeably with each other, which also makes swapping the front-ends of both cars much more convenient. To convert a 180SX into a Sileighty, the front half of the car is replaced with that of the S13 Silvia (such as the bumper, fenders, hood, and headlamps); this can also be applied to the North American 240SX hatchback as well as the RS13U 200SX hatchback sold in other countries such as the United Kingdom among others.

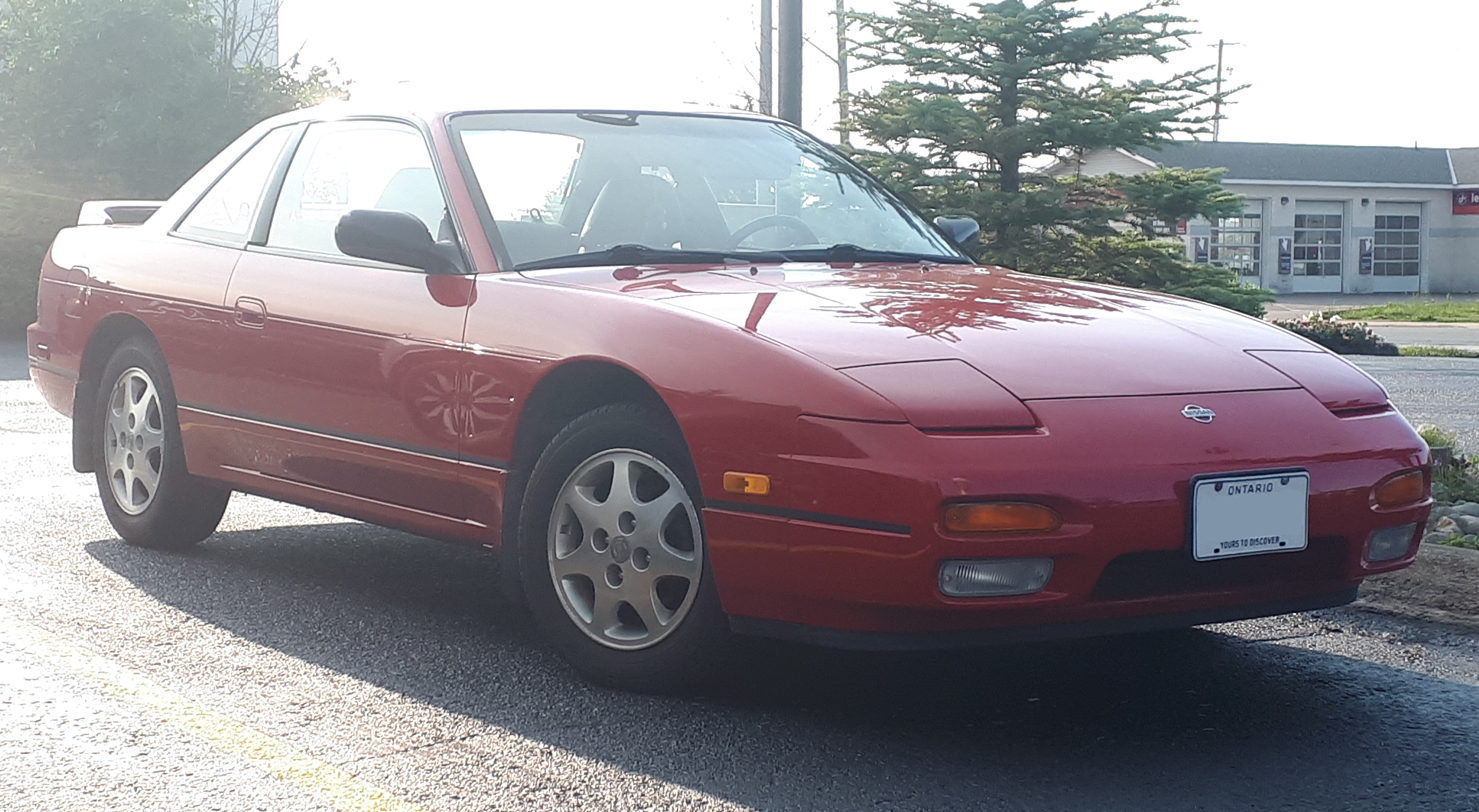
1993 Nissan 240SX LE coupé, which represents the Onevia

There is a reverse method to this approach that involves transplanting the front-end off of the 180SX/200SX/240SX into the body of an S13 Silvia, creating a unique modification that is the opposite of the Sileighty known as the Onevia. While this variation was never officially sold in its home region of Japan nor in other countries of the world, it was officially sold in North America as the 240SX coupe and convertible, where the 180SX/240SX front-end is used on an otherwise S13 Silvia notchback coupe body. On the other hand, applying the S13 Silvia front-end into the body of a North American 240SX coupe and convertible creates a left-hand drive version of the S13 Silvia that was never officially sold in North America (or other countries in the world using left-hand drive configurations); this is also known as a "JDM conversion".

== Variations ==
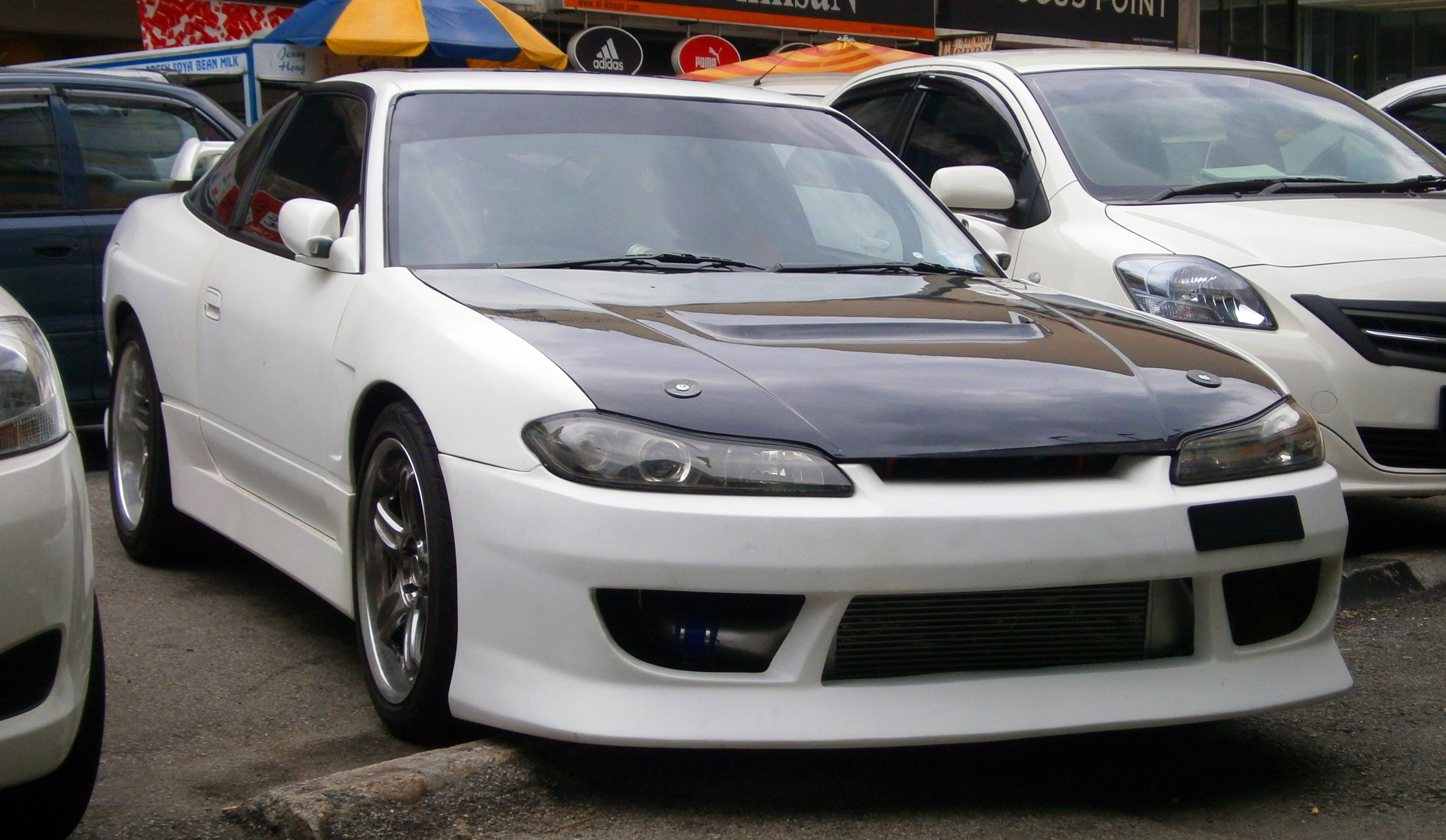
A Sileighty with the front end of an S15 Silvia

Variations based on the S13-chassis Sileighty use the front-ends of the S14 and S15 Silvia, despite those models having a vastly different body style than the S13. The S15 variant is sometimes referred to as the "strawberry face" Sileighty due to the fact that the number "15" in the model code of the S15 Silvia also means "strawberry" in Japanese. A similar rendition of this approach can also be found on the S14 Silvia, which can be modified to use an S15 Silvia front-end. Enthusiasts would sometimes label these modifications with designations such as "S13.5", "S14.5" or similar for the purposes of brevity, with the number following the dot representing the front-end conversion and the corresponding model number before it representing the actual chassis of the car in which the front-end swap is performed on.

== See also ==
- Nissan Silvia — Original notchback coupe model of the S13 with fixed headlights, of which the front-end of the Sileighty is based on
- Nissan 180SX — Three-door hatchback model of the S13 with retractable pop-up headlights, of which the middle and rear portion of the Sileighty is based on
  - Nissan 200SX — European version of the 180SX
  - Nissan 240SX — North American version of the 180SX, of which its coupe body style for the S13 is based on the Onevia
