= Tokyo Xtreme Racer (disambiguation) =

Tokyo Xtreme Racer is a racing video game series.

Tokyo Xtreme Racer may also refer to:

- Tokyo Xtreme Racer (1999 video game), the first entry in the series
- Tokyo Xtreme Racer (2025 video game)
