= Tokyo Xtreme Racer (1999 video game) =

1999 video game

- North American cover art featuring the GFLF (Mitsubishi Eclipse in the foreground) and the JZA80 (Toyota Supra in the background)
- Developer: Genki
- Publishers: JP: Genki; NA/EU: Crave Entertainment
- Series: Shutokou Battle
- Platform: Dreamcast
- Release: JP: June 24, 1999; NA: September 9, 1999; PAL: October 14, 1999
- Genre: Racing
- Modes: Single-player, multiplayer

Tokyo Xtreme Racer, known as Shutokō Battle (首都高バトル, Shutokō Batoru) in Japan and Tokyo Highway Challenge in Europe, is a 1999 racing video game by Genki, for Sega's Dreamcast console. Released as a launch title in the West, the game was one of the first mission-based racing games; it is based on illegal highway racing in Tokyo's Wangan highway with custom tuned cars. It was the second title in the Shutoku Battle/Tokyo Xtreme Racer series to be released in the West following Tokyo Highway Battle (1996).

When released in Japan, Shutokō Battle was one of the best selling Dreamcast titles at this time. A such phenomenon was growing popular in Japan at the time with dedicated manga (Shutokō Battle's biggest inspiration being Wangan Midnight), anime series and video games (C1 Circuit, Wangan Trial, Naniwa Wangan Battle).

== Gameplay ==
Gameplay featuring the Player driving the GFLF (Mitsubishi Eclipse) racing a Rival which is an NPC driving an AE86 (Toyota Corolla Levin or Sprinter Trueno)

Players challenge other drivers on the Shuto Expressway in order to gain money to modify and enhance their cars. The game features a wide variety of Japanese cars and tuning parts to purchase as the player progresses through rivals.

Since its introduction in the mid '90s, like similar games, the Shutokō Battle series never used licensed cars but the usual type designation such as "TYPE-86" and later "TYPE-AE86L3". Nicknames were used instead in the "Wangan Dead Heat" sidestory (e.g. "Rapid Fire" for the Nissan Skyline GT-R R33). These "types" are actually the real chassis code used by the Japanese makers to designate the various grades of a lineup. As the graphics quality was improving with each release, from 16-bit 2D to 3D/CG 128-bit, the featured cars were becoming more and more similar to the actual cars appearance. In a similar way, the chassis codes became longer and more precise, allowing the player to determine each grade and to use the "rename car" feature.

Inevitably, the game becoming a solid best seller, the Japanese makers forced Genki to buy the license of their cars. The very first Genki licensed game was Wangan Midnight (2002) for PlayStation 2, while the first licensed Shutokō Battle was Shutokō Battle Online (2003) released on PC. Since then, every Genki racing game uses licensed makers, and in-game cars with Honda chassis codes do not appear anymore in the Shutokō Battle games, although until 2025 as Genki announced the return of Honda for new Shutokō Battle game in late August 2025 trailer on Genki YouTube channel; however, Honda is licensed in the Kaido Battle series.

Japanese die-cast model company Tomica released a limited edition of Banshee's NSX in 1999. In the western release of the game, Banshee's controversial forehead-tattooed Hindu swastika was removed.

The game's main single-player mode, Quest Mode, involves driving around Tokyo's Metropolitan Expressway at night and challenging rival drivers. Players begin by purchasing a vehicle and can subsequently use their earnings to purchase additional cars and performance upgrades. Rival vehicles can be challenged by flashing the player's headlights behind them, initiating a battle in which each driver's Spirit Point (SP) gauge determines the outcome. The game also includes Quick Race, a two-player VS Battle mode and a Practice mode. Players can customise their vehicles and watch replays of completed battles.

== Music ==
The Japanese version features two songs by the rock band ZIGGY: "Without..." as its opening theme and "Kono Sora no Shita no Dokoka ni" (この空の下のどこかに) as its ending theme. Both songs were included on the band's 1999 album Goliath Birdeater.

== Reception ==
Reception

Aggregate score
Aggregator	Score
GameRankings	72%

Review scores
Publication	Score
AllGame	3/5
Edge	3/10
Electronic Gaming Monthly	7/10
Famitsu	32/40
Game Informer	5.75/10
GameFan	92%
GameRevolution	D
GameSpot	5.6/10
GameSpy	8/10
IGN	8.8/10
Next Generation	3/5

Tokyo Xtreme Racer received "average" reviews according to GameRankings. In Japan, Famitsu gave the title a score of 32 out of 40. Jeff Chen of NextGen said that the Japanese import of the game was "Not the greatest long-term value, but the new wrinkles make it worth a look."

GamePro called Tokyo Xtreme Racer "a racing game that rolled off the assembly line prematurely." (Note: GamePro gave the game 3/5 for graphics, 2.5/5 for sound, 3.5/5 for control and 2/5 for fun factor.)
