= Tokyo Xtreme Racer (2025 video game) =

- Developer: Genki
- Publisher: Genki
- Series: Tokyo Xtreme Racer
- Engine: Unreal Engine 5
- Platforms: PlayStation 5; Windows
- Release: 25 September 2025
- Genre: Racing
- Mode: Single-player

Tokyo Xtreme Racer (Note: Japanese: 東京エクストリームレーサー, Hepburn: Tōkyō Ekusutorīmu Rēsā) (Note: Known in Japan as Shutokō Battle (Japanese: 首都高バトル; lit. "Metropolitan Expressway Battle")) is a 2025 racing video game developed and published by Genki. It is the reboot of the Tokyo Xtreme Racer series, as well the series' first new platform title since 2006's Import Tuner Challenge, and Genki's first major platform game release in 18 years since 2007's Wangan Midnight.

The game was released on 25 September 2025 for Windows, a second for the series since 2003's Shutokō Battle Online. It was also ported to PlayStation 5 on 26 February 2026.

== Development and release ==
The game was announced with a teaser trailer released on 22 August 2024. A Steam Early Access beta version was released on 23 January 2025. Initially slated for a May 2025 release, the full version was released on 25 September 2025. At the day of its full release, Genki announced the PlayStation 5 port of the game, marking the series' return to PlayStation consoles since the 2005 spin-off Tokyo Xtreme Racer Drift 2. The PlayStation 5 version was released worldwide on 26 February 2026, with an addition of five vehicles and two features (Music Selector, and the returning Replay Mode), which were also added on the Windows version via a free update at the same time.

== Reception ==
In early access reviews, Kerry Brunskill of PC Gamer wrote that "there is no aspect of urban racing that isn't present and celebrated to its fullest here". Luke Reilly of IGN described it as an "infectiously addictive time capsule of a racing game that needs little more than a bit of menu refinement and some major aggression injected". Joe Chivers of GamesRadar+ compared the game to others like Midnight Club, saying that it "genuinely make[s] the old feel new again".
