= Tokyo Xtreme Racer 2 =

2000 video game

- North American box art featuring Toyota Supra and Honda NSX
- Developer: Genki
- Publishers: JP: Genki; NA: Crave Entertainment; EU: Crave/Ubi Soft
- Series: Tokyo Xtreme Racer
- Platform: Dreamcast
- Release: JP: June 22, 2000; NA: September 26, 2000; EU: January 19, 2001
- Genre: Racing
- Mode: Single-player

Tokyo Xtreme Racer 2, known as Shutokō Battle 2 (首都高バトル 2, Shutokō Batoru 2) in Japan and Tokyo Highway Challenge 2 in PAL territories, is a 2000 racing video game and the sequel to Tokyo Xtreme Racer, which is also on the Dreamcast. Tokyo Xtreme Racer 2 has been enhanced with better sound quality and graphics over its predecessor. The game managed to produce two more sequels. It is the last game in the series that was produced for Sega Dreamcast, though some of the game's mechanics were implemented into Daytona USA 2001.

== Reception ==
Reception

Aggregate score
Aggregator	Score
Metacritic	79/100

Review scores
Publication	Score
CNET Gamecenter	7/10
Edge	5/10
Electronic Gaming Monthly	8/10 (Note: Three critics of Electronic Gaming Monthly gave the game each a score of 8.5/10, 8/10, and 7.5/10.)
Famitsu	34/40
Game Informer	8.5/10
GameFan	88% (Note: In GameFan's early viewpoint of the game, three critics gave it each a score of 87, 86, and 92.)
GameRevolution	B−
GameSpot	7.6/10
GameSpy	8.5/10
IGN	9.3/10
Next Generation	3/5

The game received "generally favorable reviews" according to the review aggregation website Metacritic. Jeff Lundrigan of NextGen said in his review of the game that the Tokyo Xtreme Racer series "has its adherents, and while we can clearly understand the attraction, for the most part we can't quite share it." In Japan, Famitsu gave it a score of 34 out of 40. GamePro said that the game "improves on the original, but not enough to make this an engaging racer. Kids, don't try this at home." (Note: GamePro gave the game 4/5 for graphics, 2/5 for sound, 3.5/5 for control, and 2.5/5 for fun factor.)

Although not reviewed by The Electric Playground, the game was nominated for the "Best Console Driving Game" award at the Blister Awards 2000, which went to Smuggler's Run.

== Legacy ==
In 2001, a sequel for PlayStation 2 called Tokyo Xtreme Racer: Zero was released, with improved graphics and increased number of cars and rivals.

In 2003 Tokyo Xtreme Racer 3 is the third game that was developed for PlayStation 2. The game takes place after the events of previous games. The response to this game was poor and was a limited release. The game was released in Japan and some parts of North America.
