= Wangan Midnight (2007 video game) =

2007 video game

- PS3 cover art featuring Devil Z
- Developer: Genki
- Publisher: Genki
- Series: Wangan Midnight; Tokyo Xtreme Racer
- Platform: PlayStation 3
- Release: JP: July 26, 2007
- Genre: Racing
- Modes: Single player, multiplayer

Wangan Midnight (湾岸ミッドナイト, Wangan middonaito) is an action-adventure racing game developed by Genki for the PlayStation 3. It is based on the award-winning Japanese comic of the same name created by Michiharu Kusunoki in 1992. It was released in Japan, Hong Kong, Singapore and Taiwan on July 26, 2007. The game runs at Full HD 1920x1080 resolution at 30 frames per second.

This game was preceded by a PlayStation 2 version released on March 21, 2002 and is followed by a sequel released one month later on the PlayStation Portable. This game series is not related to the similar Wangan Midnight Maximum Tune arcade game series made by Bandai Namco.

== Game modes ==
Basic game modes are the Story Mode that follows the manga's plot according to the main characters point of view. The Time Attack Mode is based on time trials, and the Free Run Mode allows the user to drive the Shuto Expressway selecting his starting points without racing, and can drive anywhere on the Shuto Expressway. The One Match Mode is made for head-to-head quick games against the characters. Wangan Connection is the online game mode that allows people to create, host and join online games with up to three other players.

Through the game's progression, the user can unlock two extra game modes, Survival Mode and Maximum Speed Mode.

Survival Mode puts the player up against characters from the series. The goal is to beat a designated amount of rivals without losing. If the player loses, the game is over. Survival Mode is divided into three classes. Rookie has 20 rivals, and runs on the C1. Runner has 50 rivals, and runs on the New Belt Line. Monster has 99 rivals, and runs on the Wangan, part of the New Belt Line, and Yokohane.

Maximum Speed Mode is where the player drives a car of his choice on the Yatabe Test Course. The goal is to go as fast as they can without blowing the engine.

== Featured characters and vehicles ==
The game features the comic's main characters plus some crossover characters taken from the developer's main game series. Story mode characters voice cast is the same as the anime series but minus Tokuyoshi Kawashima due to that of his character, Masaki being skipped in the anime. Yoshiaki Ishida is not found in the game due to vehicle licensing, but he does appear in anime.

Similar to Initial D, all vehicles are licensed sports car and sport compact models from the Japanese manufacturers Nissan, Toyota, Mitsubishi, Mazda and Subaru. The only non-Japanese automaker is RUF, a European tuner of Porsche models.

=== Scenario (racers) ===
The game features several tuned cars taken from the original comic, new cars or upgraded versions are unlockable in the Story Mode. An express carrier truck is also available in the last scenario (Yasu-san) once unlocked.

Two scenarios are available on game start (Akio and Black Bird), and eight additional scenarios are unlockable.

- Akio Asakura (朝倉アキオ) (CV: Shun Oguri)

Cars: Nissan Fairlady Z (S30) ver.1/ver.2 a.k.a. "Devil Z" (悪魔のZ, Akuma no Zetto)

Akio is the main protagonist in the series, a 19-year-old live alone student. He was driving on the Wangan on board a Nissan Fairlady Z (Z31) with Ma when he was easily defeated by the "Blackbird" Porsche. He then found the scrapped body of a blue tuned Fairlady Z (S30) known as the "Devil Z" in which he bought and restored to a good condition. His racing life began since then.

- Tatsuya Shima (島達也) (CV: Shinichiro Miki):

Cars: RUF BTR (930), Ruf CTR (964) ver.1/ver.2 a.k.a. "Blackbird" (ブラックバード)

A surgeon by day and a racer by night, this man drives a black RUF (tuned Porsche) dubbed as the "Blackbird", he was the one racing with the original owner of the Devil Z when it crashed. A close friend of Eriko, he assumes the role of taking care of her in place of her dead brother. When he met Kitami, he asked him to tune the Blackbird to match the Devil Z.

- Reina Akikawa (秋川零奈) (CV: Reiko Suhou):

Cars: Nissan Skyline GT-R (BNR32) ver.1/ver.2/ver.3/ver.4

A TV personality and magazine model, she does this hectic job and decides to run her GT-R on the Wangan nightly. One night, she encountered the Devil Z and the Blackbird having a race and decided to join in, but her car spun out and crashed. Her GT-R is tuned by Kazuhiko Yamamoto. The primary love interest of Akio, she also seems to harbor feelings toward Akio.

- Kouichi Hiramoto (平本 洸一) (CV: Daisuke Namikawa)

Cars: Nissan Skyline GT-R (BNR32) ver.1/ver.2

A hardworking man in the Green Auto Shop who often races on the Wangan with his friend Harada until one day, the two encountered Reina's GT-R which makes Hiramoto decide to get his own car. He then becomes obsessed with tuning his silver R32 GT-R that his pregnant wife, Megumi left him for that very reason.

- Harada (原田) (CV: Tsubasa Yonaga)

Cars: Nissan Fairlady Z (Z31) ver.1/ver.2

Hiramoto's friend also works in the Green Auto Shop who helped him tune his R32 to race with the Devil Z and the Blackbird on the Wangan. He drives a Nissan Fairlady (Z31) in which its engine overheated when he encountered the Blackbird and tried to chase after it.

- Masaki (マサキ) (CV: Tokuyoshi Kawashima):

Cars: Mazda RX-7 Type RZ (FD3S) ver.1/ver.2

- Yamanaka (山中) (CV: Kouzou Mito)

Cars: Nissan Skyline GT-R v-spec (BCNR33)

A chief mechanic of the Speed Factory RGO tuning shop. He drives a GT-R (R33).

- Keiichiro Aizawa (相沢 圭一郎) a.k.a. "Kei" (ケイ) (CV: Kenichi Suzumura)

Cars: Toyota Supra RZ (JZA80) ver.1/ver.2 a.k.a. "Monster Supra" (モンスタースープラ)

The character who drives the Supra RZ, dubbed as the "Monster Supra" tuned by Kou Tominaga and Akio Asakura. After seeing the Devil Z, he decided to chase after him.

- Takayuki Kuroki (黒木 隆之) (CV: Akimitsu Takase)

Cars: Nissan Skyline GT-R V-spec (BCNR33) ver.1/ver.2

A devoted student of street racing, he spends hours analyzing his storehouse of data and coming up with strategies. He staunchly believes in the superiority of the Nissan Skyline GT-R (R33) and refuses to drive anything else. He's one of the very few drivers who managed to get a clean one-on-one victory over Tatsuya Shima but, when facing Akio, his engine overheated and blew. He is independent, and not associated with any tuners like some of his rivals.

- Yasu-san (安さん) (CV -)

Car: Nissan Diesel Quon/Express carrier ("Seaside Express")

The driver of the express carrier truck that Akio crashed the Devil Z in to.

=== Scenario (others) ===
The story mode features non-racer non-playable characters. These are mainly tuners.

- Jun Kitami (北見 淳) (CV: Kenta Miyake):

Jun Kitami is the owner of Kitami Cycle (キタミサイクル), the shop that tuned Akio's Z and Tatsuya's Blackbird.

- Yuichi Takagi (高木 優一) (CV: Bon Ishihara):

Takagi did bodywork on the Devil Z at his Body Shop Sunday.

- Kazuhiko Yamamoto (山本 和彦) (CV: Tomoyuki Shimura):

Kazuhiko Yamamoto owns the YM Speed shop (山本自動車). He is the one who tuned Reina's GT-R (R32) and drives his own Skyline GT-R (R34).

- Eriko Asakura (朝倉 えりこ) (CV: Mamiko Noto):

The sister of the Devil Z's original owner (who shares the same name as the Akio Asakura that is currently driving it) and Tatsuya's love interest. She steals the Devil Z one time and is stopped by the Blackbird and Akio.

=== Non Custom ===
Five Non-player character vehicles are unlockable in the Survival Mode's Rookie Class. These are "Non Custom" traffic vehicles owned by an anonymous driver (Hayashi).

1. Toyota Mark II Tourer V (JZX90)
2. Toyota Mark II Tourer V (JZX90) taxi version
3. Toyota TownAce GL (KR42V)
4. Mitsubishi Galant 2.0 DOHC Turbo VR-4 (E39A)
5. Subaru Legacy Touring Wagon GT (BF5)

=== Memories ===
Six additional racers from the Wangan Midnight manga series are available once the Yasu-san story arc is completed.

- Jun Kitami (北見 淳)

Car: Nissan Fairlady Z (S30)

- Masaki (マサキ)

Car: Mazda RX-7 ∞-III (FC3S), Nissan Fairlady Z (HGS130)

- Ohta (大田)

Car: Mazda Savanna RX-3

- "Gatchan" (ガッちゃん)

Car: Nissan Fairlady Z (HGZ31)

- Kouichi Aizawa (相沢 洸一)

Car: Toyota Celica XX (MA61)

- Yamashita (山下)

Car: Nissan Fairlady Z Version S 2seater (GCZ32)

=== Midnight Runners ===
Thirteen additional racers and their tuned cars taken from the comic are available once the Survival Mode's Runner Class is completed.

- Gen Sasaki (佐々木 元) a.k.a. "Gatchan" (ガッちゃん)

Car: Toyota Celsior 4.0C (UCF11)

- Yamanaka (山中)

Car: Nissan Skyline GT-R V-spec (BCNR33)

- Kazuhiko Yamamoto (山本 和彦)

Car: Nissan Skyline GT-R V-spec (BCNR33)

- Eiji Kamiya (エイジ)

Car: Mitsubishi Lancer Evolution V GSR (CP9A)

- Maki Kamiya (マキ)

Car: Mitsubishi Lancer Evolution VI GSR (CP9A)

- Kouichi Kijima (城島 洸一)

Car: Mazda RX-7 ∞-III (FC3S)

- Oki (オキ)

Car: Mazda RX-7 Type RZ (FD3S)

- Gen Gotoh (後藤 元)

Car: Nissan Skyline GT-R V-spec II (BNR34)

- Tomoya (友也)

Car: Nissan Skyline GT-R (BNR32)

- Makoto Morishita (森下マコト)

Car: Nissan Fairlady Z Version S 2seater (GCZ32)

- Masaki (マサキ)

Car: Toyota Aristo V300 (JZS161)

- Kou (コウ)

Car: Mazda RX-7 ∞-III (FC3S)

- Akio Asakura (朝倉 アキオ)

Car: Nissan Fairlady Z 300ZX (Z31)

=== Shutokou Battle ===
Bonus cars taken from Genki's Shutokou Battle series, including famous rivals returning from Shutokou Battle X released on Xbox 360 in September 2006 are featured in this Wangan Midnight game. These special cars featuring custom paintjobs and stickers are unlocked once the Survival Mode's Monster Class is completed.

- King Speed (迅帝)

Car: Subaru Impreza WRX STI spec C (GDB)

- Rolling Guy no.1 (ローリング野郎1号)

Car: Toyota Sprinter Trueno (AE86)

- The Rook (ザ・ルーク)

Car: Toyota Supra (JZA80)

- The Bishop (ザ・ビショップ)

Car: Toyota Supra (JZA80)

- The Knight (ザ・ナイト)

Car: Toyota Supra (JZA80)

- Blood Hound (ブラッドハウンド)

Car: Toyota Aristo (JZS61)

- Melancholy Angel (ユウウツな天使)

Car: Mazda RX-8 (SE3P)

- White Charisma (白いカリスマ)

Car: Mazda RX-7 (FD3S)

- Midnight Cinderella (12時過ぎのシンデレラ)

Car: Mazda RX-8 (SE3P)

- Death Driver (死神ドライバー)

Car: Mazda RX-8 (SE3P)

== Card system ==
=== Card set up ===
The game uses an original card system to tune the player's car and unlock extra characters scenario (Story Mode), game modes or vehicles. Tuning cards are known as "Ability" cards, namely: Tuner (rose), Body (yellow), Setting (green), Miscellaneous (blue) and Engine Resistance (purple).

The offline game is completed once all 128 cards have been gathered. Each card is unlocked when a mission is completed in a particular game mode (Story Mode, Time Attack Mode, Survival Mode or Maximum Speed Mode), though some cards need the player to reach a certain User Level through the Wangan Connection online mode.

=== Car Customize ===
Cosmetic tuning is limited to bonnet, muffler and rear spoiler change (preset paintjob and stickers are available on some bonus vehicles though). Upgraded parts are available once their respective cards have been unlocked and used.

== Official videos ==
A Full HD promotion video was released on the Japanese and South-East Asian PlayStation Store on June 22, 2007. This featurette was followed by the release of the Japanese TV commercial.

== Reception ==
The game was well received in Japan since a "PlayStation 3 the Best" greatest hits re-release has been available since July 2008.

== See also ==
- Tokyo Xtreme Racer, a similar highway racing game series by Genki
