= Kaidō Battle 2: Chain Reaction =

2004 video game

- Japanese box art
- Developer: Genki
- Publishers: JP: Genki; PAL: Konami
- Director: Nobukazu Itabashi
- Series: Tokyo Xtreme Racer
- Platform: PlayStation 2
- Release: JP: February 26, 2004; EU: November 18, 2005; AU: November 24, 2006
- Genre: Racing
- Modes: Single-player, multiplayer

Kaidō Battle 2: Chain Reaction (known as Kaido Racer in Europe) is a 2004 racing game that is the sequel to Kaidō Battle: Nikko, Haruna, Rokko, Hakone, containing all the tracks and gameplay elements of that game and new content. The game also supports the GT Force steering wheel and pedal set. Unlike its predecessor and successor, the game was not released in North America.

== Gameplay ==
Chronologically, the game is set one year after Tokyo Xtreme Racer: Drift and Tokyo Xtreme Racer 3, and one year before Tokyo Xtreme Racer: Drift 2. It is set in an unspecified time frame in the 21st century, where mountain passes have been converted into enclosed racetracks with futuristic technology, as implied by the game's conquest introduction.

In addition to the previously introduced CA (Cornering Artist) and SA (Spirit Attack) modes, this sequel also features new gameplay modes such as FL/LF (First and Last/Last and First) battle modes, TAC (Time Attack Collision) or CAT (Cornering Artist Target) battles. Cars can be bought new or used, and the player can buy many tuning parts. By completing sponsors, sponsor stickers can also be fitted for additional money. Additionally, two players can race in a versus battle with split-screen.

A large number of rivals have returned from the previous game, and there are new rival types such as the Lovers; female drivers who send the player mail upon beating them. Beating rivals can also unlock musical samples for the player to create their own music in the game's "Sound Editor" mode.

=== Cars ===
The total number of vehicles included, including Nissan, Toyota, and Honda, is approximately 200. The game also includes some European models, with additional licenses from Alfa Romeo, Audi, Mercedes-Benz and Opel.

== Reception ==
In Japan, Famitsu scored Kaidō Battle 2: Chain Reaction a 33/40. It sold 91,785 copies in Japan despite its good score.
