= Genki (company) =

Japanese video game developer

Genki Co., Ltd.

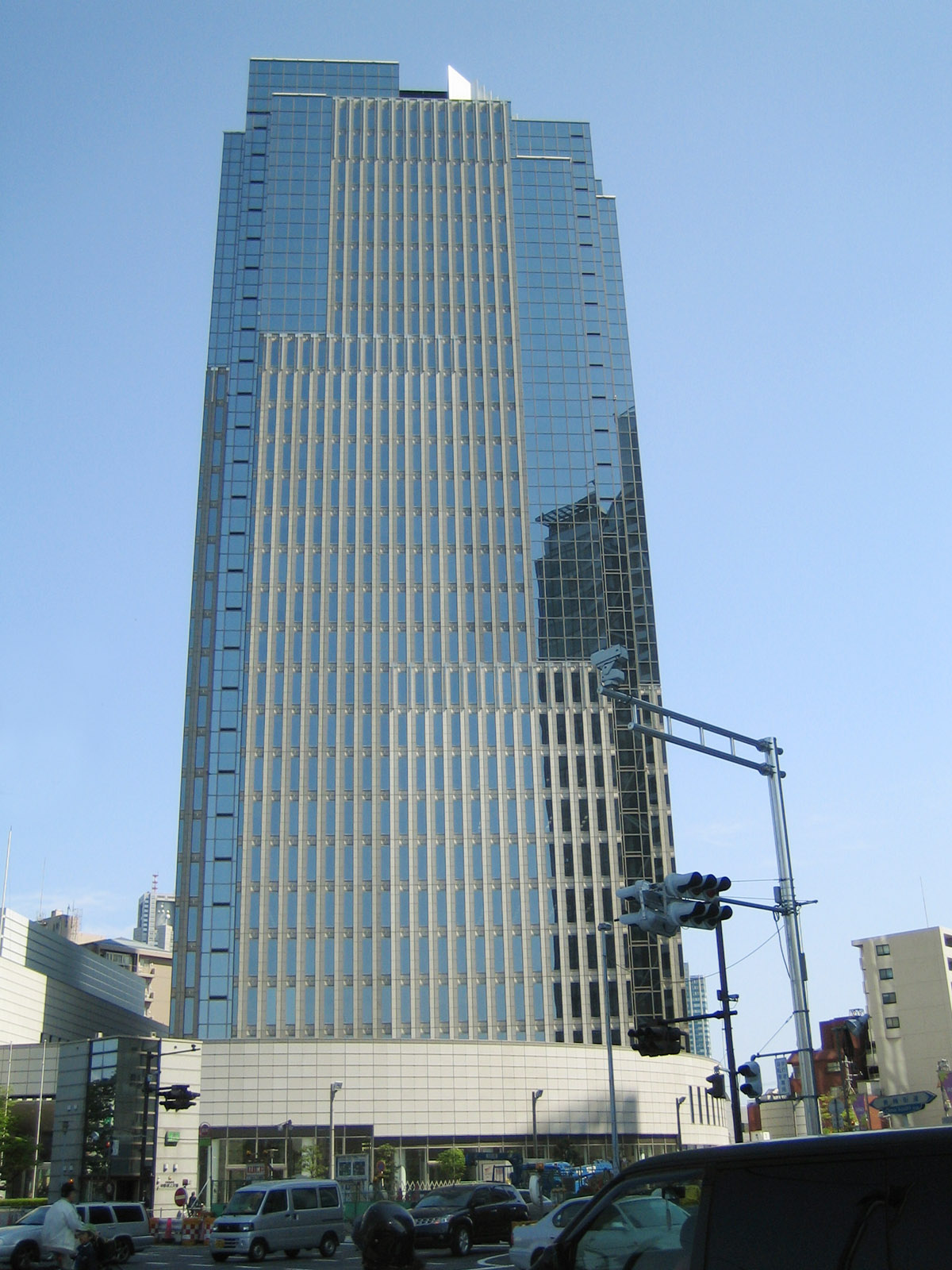
- Headquarters in Nakano, Tokyo
- Native name: 元気株式会社
- Romanized name: Genki Kabushiki-gaisha
- Type: Kabushiki gaisha
- Industry: Video games
- Founded: October 16, 1990 (original company); February 26, 2008 (current company)
- Headquarters: Honchō, Nakano, Tokyo, Japan
- Key people: Mizuki Horikoshi (President)
- Products: Shutokou Battle series Kengo series
- Number of employees: 102 (as of March 31, 2025)
- Parent: Daikoku Denki
- Website: genki.co.jp/en/

Genki Co., Ltd. (元気株式会社, Genki Kabushiki Kaisha) is a Japanese video game developer. It was founded in October 1990 by Hiroshi Hamagaki and Tomo Kimura, who left Sega to form the company. The company is best known for its racing game titles inspired by Japan's on-going underground tōge and wangan racing scene.

== History ==
In its early years, Genki released games in different genres, looking for its niche. On one end of the spectrum, there was Devilish, a game similar to Arkanoid that was released for Sega's Game Gear and Mega Drive systems in 1991. On the other end, there was Kileak: The DNA Imperative, a first-person mecha shooting game for the PlayStation which was released in 1995 and received a sequel, Epidemic.

They developed two MotoGP video games for the SNES: GP-1 (1993) and GP-1 RS: Rapid Stream (1994).

Genki found its niche in 1994 with the release of Shutokō Battle '94 Keichii Tsuchiya Drift King for the SNES—the first in a long-running series of racing games. Shutokou Battle 2 followed one year later, in 1995, and was also for the SNES.

Within the same year, Genki shifted towards developing 3D games, continuing the Shutokou Battle series with Highway 2000 (released in Japan as Wangan Dead Heat) on the Sega Saturn. Genki also produced major titles for both the PlayStation and Nintendo 64 consoles in the following two years, including another Shutokou Battle game for the PlayStation (known in Western markets as Tokyo Highway Battle) and Multi-Racing Championship for the N64. They also developed Jade Cocoon for the PlayStation in 1998.

=== Shutokou Battle ===
Continuing with the genre that was consistently the most rewarding for them, Genki continued the Shutokou Battle series, releasing a title for Sega's Dreamcast console in 1999. This game was released in Western markets, where it came to be known as Tokyo Xtreme Racer (U.S.) and Tokyo Highway Challenge (Europe). The Dreamcast version of Shutokou Battle enjoyed much greater success than any of its predecessors, and was followed by Shutokou Battle 2 (Tokyo Xtreme Racer 2), also for the Dreamcast, and Shutokou Battle Zero (Tokyo Xtreme Racer Zero) for the PlayStation 2.

In 2002, Namco partnered with Genki to produce a game based on Michiharu Kusunoki's racing manga, Wangan Midnight. Namco developed the arcade version (based largely on Genki's gameplay mechanics), which was imported to the U.S., while Genki developed the Japan-only PlayStation 2 version. In 2003, Genki released Shutokou Battle 01 (Tokyo Xtreme Racer 3) for the PlayStation 2. Namco partnered with Sega to continue its arcade game series with the release of Wangan Midnight Maximum Tune in 2004 that shifted away from the Shutokou Battle style. It is still developed today and receives regular updates across Japan, Asia, Oceania, China, and North America remaining exclusive to arcades with Genki still featuring in its credits. Genki continued to produce the Japan-only Wangan Midnight games for the PlayStation 3 (with an online mode) and PlayStation Portable in June and September 2007. These games stuck to the gameplay of the original PS2 game and were not ports of the arcade versions, something that Sega had success with in their Initial D series of games.

=== GRP: Genki Racing Project ===
In response to the success of their racing titles, particularly the Shutokou Battle series, Genki established a division dedicated to that genre in 2003 called the Genki Racing Project, or GRP. The GRP's first title was Shutokou Battle Online for Microsoft Windows, which tried to apply an MMO-like aspect to the existing gameplay of the series. The game and its update version were sold only in Japan but were playable from anywhere as free online trial versions (with free registration) were available for download on the game's website.

Less than two months later, the GRP released the touge-based drifting/racing game Kaido Battle, which was a rather stark departure from the Tokyo-highway-based Shutokou Battle series. Kaido Battle was followed by Kaido Battle 2: Chain Reaction in 2004 and Kaido Battle: Touge No Densetsu in 2005. All three titles were released for the PS2. Kaido Battle and Kaido Battle: Touge no Densetsu were both released in North America, under the titles Tokyo Xtreme Racer: Drift and Tokyo Xtreme Racer: Drift 2, respectively. By comparison, European markets received Kaido Battle 2: Chain Reaction and Kaido Battle: Touge no Densetsu, under the names Kaido Racer and Kaido Racer 2.

In 2005, Genki released Shutokou Battle: Zone of Control for PlayStation Portable. It was translated and released in the US as Street Supremacy.

Among the various other adaptations of Shutokou Battle lies another unique title marketed as a "Car Tuning RPG", called Racing Battle: C1 Grand Prix, which was released for the PS2 in 2005. Racing Battle was a departure from highway and mountain racing, instead focusing on real-life tracks such as Tsukuba Circuit, Suzuka Circuit, and TI Circuit.

The last main Shutokou Battle game released was Shutokou Battle X for the Xbox 360, which was released in 2006 and is known in Western markets as Import Tuner Challenge.

In late 2006, Genki announced they would end the Shutokou Battle series, and eventually shut down the Genki Racing Project, as a part of a cost-cutting operation.

However, on July 22, 2016, Genki announced that the Project would be rebooted, hoping to have new Shoutoku and/or Kaido Battle games for the next generation. On December 27, 2016, they revealed a countdown for their new racing game project. The countdown ended up being for the 2017 Shoutoku Battle mobile game, Shoutoku Battle Xtreme. However, the servers went offline in November that same year.

=== Kengo ===
Kengo (剣豪) is the name of a series of fighting video games developed by Genki. Kengo is considered a spiritual successor to the Bushido Blade game series for the PlayStation.

Genki released four games in the series, between 2000 and 2006, for the PlayStation 2 and Xbox 360: Kengo: Master of Bushido, Kengo 2, Kengo 3 and Kengo Zero (Kengo: Legend of 9 in North America).

In April 1999, Genki acquired a 40% stake in the developer of the series, Lightweight. In March 2001 Lightweight became a wholly owned subsidiary of Genki, but dissolved this connection on March 31, 2006 when Lightweight was bought by Index Visual & Games, Ltd.

=== Spectrobes: Origins ===
In 2009, Genki developed Spectrobes: Origins. The game was the last in the Spectrobes trilogy of games published by Disney Interactive Studios, with the first two games being developed by Jupiter.

=== Recent works ===
In 2010, Genki created an alternate reality game division called Genki ARG to replace the discontinued Genki Racing Project. This division was closed in late March 2012.

Around the same time, Genki assisted UTV Ignition Games in the development of their 2011 action game release El Shaddai: Ascension of the Metatron according to the game's director, helping them with the creation of the acclaimed one-off motorcycle action sequence taking place in Chapter 6: Azazel's Zeal, for which they were left uncredited.

The Shutokou Battle series was revived with a Mobage version for mobile phones released on January 27, 2017. This was the first Shutokou Battle game after GRP was discontinued. On September 28 of the same year, however, Genki announced that they were discontinuing the service, which was shut down by the end of November.

On August 22, 2024, Genki announced a new entry in the Tokyo Xtreme Racer series, simply titled Tokyo Xtreme Racer, released on January 23, 2025 under early access, with the full release being released on September 25, 2025. The PlayStation 5 version was released on February 26, 2026.

== Games ==
Year	Title	Platform(s)	Publisher(s)
1992	Aguri Suzuki F-1 Super Driving	SNES, Game Boy	LOZC G. Amusements (JP) / Absolute Entertainment (NA) / Altron (EU)
1993	GP-1	SNES	Atlus
1994	Shutokō Battle '94 Keiichi Tsuchiya Drift King	SNES	Bullet-Proof Software
1994	Burning Soldier	3DO	Pack-In-Video (JP) / Panasonic (NA/EU)
1994	GP-1: Part II	SNES	Atlus
1995	Shutokō Battle 2: Drift King Keiichi Tsuchiya & Masaaki Bandoh	SNES	Bullet-Proof Software
1995	Kileak: The DNA Imperative	PlayStation	Sony Music Entertainment Japan
1995	Hang-On GP	Saturn	Sega
1995	Epidemic	PlayStation	Sony Computer Entertainment
1995	Highway 2000	Saturn	Pack-In-Video
1996	Tōge Densetsu: Saisoku Battle	SNES	Bullet-Proof Software
1996	Tokyo Highway Battle	PlayStation	Bullet-Proof Software
1996	Shutokō Battle Gaiden: Super Technic Challenge - Road To Drift King	PlayStation	MediaQuest Holdings
1996	Wangan Dead Heat + Real Arrange	Saturn	Pack-In-Video
1996	BRAHMA Force: The Assault on Beltlogger 9	PlayStation	Jaleco
1996	Chōkūkan Night: Pro Yakyū King	Nintendo 64	Imagineer
1997	MRC: Multi-Racing Championship	Nintendo 64	Imagineer (JP) / Ocean Software (WW)
1998	Fighter Destiny	Nintendo 64	Imagineer (JP) / Ocean of America (NA) / Infogrames (EU)
1998	Sim City 2000	Nintendo 64	Imagineer
1998	Jade Cocoon: Story of the Tamamayu	PlayStation	Genki (JP) / Crave Entertainment (WW)
1999	Tokyo Xtreme Racer	Dreamcast	Crave Entertainment (NA/EU) / Ubi Soft (EU)
1999	Fighter Destiny 2	Nintendo 64	Imagineer (JP) / SouthPeak Interactive (NA)
1999	Chōkūkan Night: Pro Yakyū King 2	Nintendo 64	Imagineer
1999	Rally Challenge 2000	Nintendo 64	Imagineer (JP) / SouthPeak Interactive (NA)
2000	Super Magnetic Neo	Dreamcast	Crave Entertainment
2000	Tokyo Xtreme Racer 2	Dreamcast	Crave Entertainment (NA/EU) / Ubi Soft (EU)
2000	Kengo: Master of Bushido	PlayStation 2	Genki (JP)
2001	Tokyo Xtreme Racer Zero	PlayStation 2	Crave Entertainment (NA/EU) / Ubi Soft (EU)
2001	Jade Cocoon 2	PlayStation 2	Genki (JP) / Ubi Soft (WW)
2001	Napoleon	Game Boy Advance	Nintendo
2002	Wangan Midnight	PlayStation 2 (JP), Namco System 246 (NA/JP, arcade)	Genki (JP, PS2), Namco (NA/JP, arcade)
2002	Phantom Crash	Xbox	Phantagram
2002	Sword of the Samurai (Kengo 2)	PlayStation 2	Genki (JP), Ubisoft (EU)
2002	Maximum Chase	Xbox	Microsoft Game Studios (JP) / Majesco (EU)
2003	Kaidō Battle: Nikko, Haruna, Rokko, Hakone (JP)	PlayStation 2	Genki (JP)
2003	Tokyo Xtreme Racer 3	PlayStation 2	Crave Entertainment
2004	Kaidō Battle 2: Chain Reaction (JP)	PlayStation 2	Genki (JP)
2004	Kengo 3	PlayStation 2	Genki (JP)
2005	Street Supremacy	PlayStation Portable	Konami
2005	Kaido Battle: Touge no Densetsu (JP)	PlayStation 2	Genki (JP)
2005	S.L.A.I.: Steel Lancer Arena International	PlayStation 2	Konami
2006	Tokyo Xtreme Racer: Drift (NA)	PlayStation 2	Crave Entertainment
2006	Import Tuner Challenge	Xbox 360	Ubisoft
2006	Kengo Zero (Kengo: Legend of the 9)	Xbox 360	Genki (JP), Majesco (EU/NA)
2007	Tokyo Xtreme Racer: Drift 2 (NA)	PlayStation 2	Crave Entertainment (NA) / Konami (EU)
2007	Wangan Midnight	PlayStation 3	Genki (JP)
2007	Wangan Midnight Portable (JP)	PlayStation Portable	Genki (JP)
2009	Katamari Forever	PlayStation 3	Namco Bandai Games / Infogrames
2009	Spectrobes: Origins	Wii	Disney Interactive Studios
2024	Devil Road Run!	PC	Genki
2025	Tokyo Xtreme Racer	PC, PlayStation 5	Genki
