= Chōkūkan Night: Pro Yakyū King =

1996 video game

Chōkūkan Night Pro Yakyū King
- Developer(s): Genki
- Publisher(s): Imagineer
- Platform(s): Nintendo 64
- Release: JP: December 20, 1996
- Genre(s): Sports
- Mode(s): Single-player; Multiplayer

Chōkūkan Night Pro Yakyū King (Note: Japanese: 超空間ナイター プロ野球キング, Hepburn: Chōkūkan Naitā Puro Yakyū Kingu) is a baseball game developed by Genki and published by Imagineer for the Nintendo 64. It was released only in Japan in 1996 and has a sequel, Chōkūkan Night: Pro Yakyū King 2.
