= Rally Challenge 2000 =

1999 video game

- North American box art featuring a Hyundai Coupe Evo II
- Developer: Genki
- Publishers: SouthPeak Games; Xicat Interactive, Inc.
- Platform: Nintendo 64
- Release: JP: August 6, 1999; NA: June 30, 2000
- Genre: Racing
- Modes: Single-player, multiplayer

Reception

Aggregate score
Aggregator	Score
Metacritic	41/100

Review scores
Publication	Score
Electronic Gaming Monthly	3.5/10
GamePro	11.5/20
GameRevolution	D
GameSpot	4.4/10
IGN	6/10
N64 Magazine	61%
Nintendo Power	6.6/10
Video Games (DE)	80%

Rally Challenge 2000, released in Japan as Rally '99, is a racing game for the Nintendo 64. It was released in the United States in 2000. Includes cars from the 1998 and 1999 World Rally Championship.

== Courses ==
Players can race on nine tracks:

- Easy – Australia, Spain, Great Britain
- Medium – Italy, Brazil, France
- Expert – Germany, Canada, US

== Cars ==
Players can drive these nine cars (all real life):

- Mitsubishi Lancer Evolution IV (Japan)
- Subaru Impreza WRC (Japan)
- Toyota Corolla WRC (Japan)
- Nissan Almera Kit Car (Japan)
- SEAT Córdoba WRC (Spain)
- Škoda Octavia (Czech Republic)
- Volkswagen Golf GTI (Germany)
- Proton Wira (Malaysia)
- Hyundai Coupe Evo II (South Korea)
