= Highway 2000 (video game) =

1995 video game

- European cover art featuring a Toyota Supra
- Developer: Genki
- Publishers: JP: Pack-In-Video, Victor Company of Japan; EU: JVC Musical Industries Europe; NA: Natsume Inc.
- Platform: Sega Saturn
- Release: JP: December 15, 1995; JP: August 9, 1996 (Real Arrange); EU: September 1996; NA: November 1996
- Genre: Racing
- Modes: Single-player, multiplayer

Highway 2000 (known in Japan as Wangan Dead Heat (Note: Japanese: 湾岸デッドヒート)) is a 1995 racing video game developed by Genki for the Sega Saturn. The Japanese version takes place on the Wangan route of the Shuto Expressway in Tokyo. An updated version, Wangan Dead Heat + Real Arrange (Note: Japanese: 湾岸デッドヒート＋リアルアレンジ), was released in 1996 for the Saturn. Two further games in the Wangan series were released in Japan in 1998: Wangan Trial for the PlayStation and Wangan Trial Love for the Sega Saturn.

== Gameplay ==
The player can choose from three sports cars and race across five highways against either human or computer opponents, or against the clock. The two-player mode is called "Battle Mode" and is done in split screen. Three camera angles are available: two from outside the car and one from the inside. The game stands out by letting players choose a glamorous female co-driver from ten options, who critiques their performance (the European version features different actors in the full-motion video (FMV) sequences compared to the Japanese version). The player must finish first on each track to advance to the next level.

== Release ==
The game was initially set to be released on December 8, 1995, but was eventually released on December 15, 1995. An updated version, Wangan Dead Heat + Real Arrange, was released in Japan on August 9, 1996. It features new co-drivers and the car handling has been changed. A second disc is included with the game that contains video clips. It supports the Movie Card accessory which improves video quality.

== Reception ==
Reception

Review scores
Publication	Score
GamePro	2.0/5
Mean Machines Sega	69%
Fun Generation	6/10
M! Games	53/100
Player One	69%
Sega Saturn Magazine (JP)	16/30 (Real Arrange)
Saturn+	62%
Super GamePower	3.2/5

Saturn+ called the co-driver idea "a cheap gimmick" and the game overall "pretty naff". Mean Machines Sega's reviewer said the graphics are "shoddy", the sound is "painful", and the FMVs are "tacky". The other reviewer from the magazine said the controls and graphics are "standard" with the babes being the only notable aspect of the game. GamePro called it "the worst-performing racing game in recent memory". They recommended Daytona USA instead.

== See also ==
- Tokyo Xtreme Racer, similar racing game series developed by Genki
