= Maximum Chase =

2002 video game

- Developer: Genki
- Publishers: JP: Microsoft Game Studios; NA: Majesco
- Directors: Tsutomu Hagiwara; Katsunori Yamaji; Kentaro Taguchi
- Composers: Yasuharu Takanashi; Seiichi Negi
- Platform: Xbox
- Release: JP: September 26, 2002; NA: November 5, 2003
- Genres: Action, vehicular combat
- Mode: Single-player

Maximum Chase (Note: Japanese: マキシマムチェイス, Hepburn: Makishimamu Cheisu) is a 2002 action video game featuring vehicular combat developed by Genki exclusively for the Xbox gaming console. The game is published by Microsoft Game Studios in Japan and Majesco in North America. Maximum Chase features around 20 licensed car brands, including Chevrolet, Lexus, Nissan, and Pontiac.

== Plot ==
Levels take place entirely within a car and are split into driving and shooting sections while controlling the main character, Rick Summer, who is played by actor Chris Hatfield.

== Reception ==
Reception

Aggregate score
Aggregator	Score
Metacritic	56/100

Review scores
Publication	Score
1Up.com	3.5/10
Famitsu	30/40
Game Informer	7/10
GameSpot	6/10
Official Xbox Magazine (US)	4/10
TeamXbox	6.7/10
X-Play	2/5

Maximum Chase received "mixed or average" reviews, according to the review aggregation website Metacritic. In Japan, however, Famitsu gave it a score of 30 out of 40.

Brad Shoemaker, reviewing the game for GameSpot, said it was a nice diversion for a few hours but criticized the lack of replay value, technical bugs, and the fact the game had an MSRP of full retail price, calling it "nearly a crime".
