= Street Supremacy =

2005 video game

- European cover art a Nissan 350Z and Mitsubishi Lancer Evolution IX
- Developer: Genki
- Publishers: JP: Genki; WW: Konami
- Director: Yousuke Kawamura
- Producer: Tomoharu Kimura
- Composer: Riverside Music
- Series: Tokyo Xtreme Racer
- Platform: PlayStation Portable
- Release: JP: April 21, 2005; NA: February 28, 2006; EU: September 29, 2006; AU: October 6, 2006
- Genre: Racing
- Modes: Single-player, multiplayer

Street Supremacy (Note: Known in Japan as Shutokō Battle (Japanese: 首都高バトル) and originally titled Shutokō Battle: Zone of Control) is a racing video game developed by Genki and published by Konami in North America, Europe and Australia. It is part of the Tokyo Xtreme Racer series, despite not being named as such. It was released on April 21, 2005, in Japan, February 28, 2006, in North America, September 2006 in France and October 6, 2006, in Australia for the PlayStation Portable. It received poor reviews from critics, primarily citing its loading times and driving mechanics.

== Reception ==
The game received an aggregate score of 41/100 on Metacritic, indicating "generally unfavorable reviews".

Alex Navarro of GameSpot rated the game 4.5/10, praising the game's team battle mode but criticizing the loading times, driving gameplay and "broken" ad-hoc multiplayer mode, as well as the game's lack of free roam. 1Up.com gave the game a D+ rating, calling the game's life bar mechanic "pretty intense", but saying that the racing mechanics feel "like ice racing most of the time". Chris Roper of IGN rated the game 2.5/10, calling it "easily one of the worst racing games I've ever laid my hands on, bar none", and noting that the ad-hoc multiplayer was "completely and entirely nonfunctional", and that both racers became more and more out of sync as the race progressed.
