= Gran Turismo Concept =

2002 sim racing video game

- European box art
- Developer(s): Polyphony Digital
- Publisher(s): Sony Computer Entertainment
- Producer(s): Kazunori Yamauchi
- Composer(s): Daiki Kasho; Isamu Ohira
- Series: Gran Turismo
- Platform(s): PlayStation 2
- Release: JP: January 1, 2002; KOR: May 16, 2002; EU: July 17, 2002
- Genre(s): Racing simulation
- Mode(s): Single-player, multiplayer

Gran Turismo Concept (Note: Japanese: グランツーリスモ コンセプト, Hepburn: Guran Tsūrisumo Konseputo) is a 2002 sim racing video game developed by Polyphony Digital and published by Sony Computer Entertainment for the PlayStation 2. It is the fourth overall installment the Gran Turismo series. The full game was unreleased in the North American market, although a stripped-down version of it was released in form of Gran Turismo: Nissan 350Z Edition.

== Versions ==
=== 2001 Tokyo ===
The 2001 Tokyo version features Tokyo Motor Show 2001 concept cars including the Nissan GT-R Concept '01, for a total of 51 cars. The game also comes with a 64-page manual, featuring images of the available cars. It was released in Japan and Southeast Asia on January 1, 2002. As of April 2008, Gran Turismo Concept 2001 Tokyo had shipped 430,000 copies in Japan and 10,000 in Southeast Asia.

=== 2002 Tokyo-Seoul ===
A second version, 2002 Tokyo-Seoul, was released in South Korea on May 16, 2002, to celebrate the PlayStation 2 official launch in this country. It featured cars from the 2001 Tokyo version plus additional models unveiled at the Seoul Motor Show. This game introduced South Korean automakers, like Hyundai, in the Gran Turismo series. As of April 2008, Gran Turismo Concept 2002 Tokyo-Seoul had shipped 90,000 copies in South Korea.

=== 2002 Tokyo-Geneva ===
A last version, 2002 Tokyo-Geneva, was released in Europe on July 17, 2002. It featured all the cars from the 2002 Tokyo-Seoul version plus new models unveiled at the Geneva Motor Show including the Volkswagen W12. A Chinese/English NTSC version was released in the Southeast Asia on July 25, adding 30 cars to the 2001 Tokyo version released earlier in this area. As of April 2008, Gran Turismo Concept 2002 Tokyo-Geneva had shipped 1 million copies in Europe and 30,000 in Southeast Asia. 2002 Tokyo-Geneva is the definitive version of GT Concept, as it has the most cars, including the Ford GT40 LM Edition.

== Reception and sales ==
On release, Famitsu magazine scored the 2001 Tokyo version of the game a 33 out of 40.

As of April 30, 2008, all versions of Gran Turismo Concept combined have shipped 430,000 copies in Japan, 1 million in Europe, and 130,000 in Asia for a total of 1.56 million copies.
