= Tokyo Xtreme Racer 3 =

2003 video game

- North American box art featuring Toyota Supra (background) and Nissan Skyline GT-R (R34) (foreground)
- Developer: Genki
- Publishers: JP: Genki; NA: Crave Entertainment
- Series: Tokyo Xtreme Racer
- Platform: PlayStation 2
- Release: JP: July 24, 2003; NA: November 18, 2003
- Genre: Racing
- Modes: Single-player, multiplayer

Tokyo Xtreme Racer 3 (known in Japan as Shutokou Battle 01) is a 2003 racing game for the PlayStation 2 and the follow-up to the 2001 game Tokyo Xtreme Racer: Zero. The game was released in North America but, unlike previous entries in the series, was not published in Europe. It was later followed by Tokyo Xtreme Racer: Drift (a prequel) and Tokyo Xtreme Racer: Drift 2 (a sequel), which are set in the mountain regions of Japan.

== Plot ==
Two years after the events of Shutokō Battle 0 (and some time after the events of Tokyo Xtreme Racer: Drift 2), news of the 13 Devils' defeat has spread throughout Japan. Tokyo is in turmoil, and two other cities, Osaka and Nagoya, want to compete for dominance. Racers must defeat every team in these three cities to challenge the top teams and drivers in each: Speed King & Dejected Angel in Tokyo, Seeks, Genesis R & D3 in Nagoya, and No Loser & Darts in Osaka.

The game is divided into two parts. In the first part, the player must defeat all bosses in the first sector of each city within a limited play area consisting only of the surrounding highways, excluding the longer, high-speed routes. After defeating these initial bosses, all areas of the three cities become accessible, allowing the player to race anywhere and unlocking the full maps, giving the player freedom in how they progress through the second half of the game.

During the events of Import Tuner Challenge, it is confirmed that TXR3's player character is named Hajime Hisanaga, who later becomes "Snake Eyes" (ITC's main antagonist), and that he either never raced or defeated Speed King (Jintei), which may explain why ??? never appears in TXR3 even if the game features his car, a Nissan Fairlady Z S30. Therefore, TXR3's final race against Jintei may not be canon.

== Gameplay ==
The premise of the game is identical to previous entries in the Tokyo Xtreme Racer series: the player cruises the highways of Japan at night, challenging opponents to impromptu battles. When a race begins, each vehicle has an overhead meter labeled "SP", which functions as the vehicle's health. The vehicle trailing the leader will have its SP slowly drained over time, with the drain rate increasing with the distance between the cars. The meter is also drained by collisions with walls, traffic, or other racers. The player can use their car's indicators to signal their intended route to the opponent, who will attempt to follow. If the two cars take different routes, the match ends in a draw.

At the start of the game, the player begins with a small selection of stock cars, primarily entry-level sports cars or large sedans. As the player progresses by defeating either a team leader or a "wanderer" driving a specific type of car, they can unlock that opponent's car for purchase. The game features over 100 cars from 15 manufacturers, including Japanese, American, and European brands. Car handling characteristics vary significantly. Smaller, lighter cars handle much better but generally lack the power of larger, heavier cars. Cars can be customized both internally and externally, and a livery editor allows players to add decals to their cars. Up to 5 cars can be owned simultaneously.

Throughout the game's story ("Quest") mode, the player is tasked with racing against and defeating team members and their leaders, who appear after all other members of their team have been defeated. The player can choose from three locations: the Shuto Expressway in Tokyo, the Ring Route in Nagoya, and the Hanshin Expressway in Osaka.

Additionally, the player may encounter "Wanderer" drivers, who have no team affiliation and often drive unique or highly modified cars. Many wanderers require specific conditions to appear, such as racing on a particular day of the in-game week, setting a certain in-game option a specific way, achieving a certain vehicle mileage, or amassing a specific amount of in-game currency.

== Reception ==
Reception

Aggregate scores
Aggregator	Score
GameRankings	64.64%
Metacritic	63/100

The game received mixed reception. GameRankings gave it a score of 64.64%, while Metacritic gave it 63 out of 100.

While critics praised the graphics, depth of car customization, and lengthy storyline, the game was also criticized for repetitive gameplay, a floaty handling model, short rendering distance, and poor translation.

The North American version specifically drew criticism due to a currency conversion bug that prevented players from fully completing the game. One wanderer, named "Whirlwind Fanfare", located in Osaka, requires the player to have amassed 100,000,000 CR to appear. However, the game enforced a limit of 99,999,990 CR, making this amount impossible to reach and preventing the game's full completion without cheating. This bug was caused by an oversight during localization; CR values for the North American release were intended to be 1/100 of their Japanese counterparts to represent US dollars instead of Japanese yen, but the developers failed to update the CR requirement for challenging Whirlwind Fanfare. In 2024, a fan patch was released that fixed this bug.
