= Tokyo Highway Battle =

1996 video game

- North American PlayStation box art featuring a Efini RX-7 and Toyota Supra
- Developer: Genki
- Publishers: PlayStation: JP: Bullet-Proof Software; NA: Jaleco; EU: THQ; Saturn; Imagineer
- Series: Tokyo Xtreme Racer
- Platforms: PlayStation, Sega Saturn
- Release: PlayStation: JP: May 3, 1996; NA: August 9, 1996; EU: June 27, 1997; Saturn: JP: February 28, 1997
- Genre: Racing
- Modes: Single-player, multiplayer

Tokyo Highway Battle is a 1996 racing video game developed by Genki for the PlayStation and Sega Saturn. It was released in Japan as Shutokou Battle: Drift King for the PlayStation, and Shutokō Battle '97 for the Saturn. The game is part of the Shutokou Battle franchise.

== Gameplay ==
Tokyo Highway Battle is a game in which players race around three tracks on the highways of Tokyo.

== Reception ==
Next Generation reviewed the PlayStation version of the game, rating it three stars out of five, and stated that "Tokyo Highway Battle doesn't rank up there with the best of them, but it isn't far behind."

In Japan, Famitsu scored the PlayStation version 29 out of 40. The reviewers liked the controls, the presence of regular vehicles on courses, and called the balance "perfect". The Saturn version received 27 out of 40.
