= Tokyo Xtreme Racer: Zero =

2001 video game

- North American box art featuring a Toyota Supra Turbo and Nissan 180SX
- Developer: Genki
- Publishers: JP: Genki; NA: Crave Entertainment; EU: Crave/Ubi Soft
- Director: Shigeo Koyama
- Series: Tokyo Xtreme Racer
- Platform: PlayStation 2
- Release: JP: March 15, 2001; NA: May 29, 2001; EU: June 29, 2001
- Genre: Racing
- Modes: Single-player, multiplayer

Tokyo Xtreme Racer Zero, released as Tokyo Xtreme Racer in PAL territories (not to be confused with the Dreamcast game) and Shutokou Battle 0 in Japan, is a 2001 racing game developed by Genki for PlayStation 2. Despite its name, it is set between Tokyo Xtreme Racer 2 and Drift, and has enhanced sound and graphics.

This is the first game in the series to be released on PlayStation 2. The Tokyo Xtreme Racer series has produced a total of six games, the first four being U.S. localizations of the first four Shutokou Battle series games and the final two being U.S. localizations of the first and third Kaido Battle series games.

== Gameplay ==
The game does not make use of regular racing rules; instead, it makes use of SP (Spirit Points) bars for both racers, similar to "health bars" in fighting video games. The SP bar is depleted when one hits an obstacle or is far behind their opponent. The battle ends as soon as one has their SP bar completely empty; their opponent is declared the winner. If the opposing racers take different routes, the battle is aborted and considered a draw.

The game has an in-game currency called CP, earned by doing battles with any rival. The accumulated CP can then be used to buy cars and parts.

The player's car performance can deteriorate should they decide not to take measures in which they drive slowly when they're not in a race, or decrease their boost level, especially when they're in a turbo car. However, if the player returns to the garage, the performance of their car will be reset.

The game has a list of 165 cars, all of which are unlicensed and have altered badges to avoid copyright.

== Sequels ==
The hero defeats all the teams, the 13 Devils, "Speed King", and "Zodiac". The player is then challenged by "???", in a dark blue Fairlady Z S30Z (based on the Devil Z from Wangan Midnight) and defeats him as well. The story is followed by the sequel Tokyo Xtreme Racer: Drift, in which an unknown rookie begins his career on touge roads instead. This was also followed by Tokyo Xtreme Racer 3, where many racers from Zero and Drift return with the addition of newer rivals in locations spanning from Tokyo, Nagoya, and Osaka.

== Reception ==
Reception

Aggregate score
Aggregator	Score
Metacritic	76/100

Review scores
Publication	Score
AllGame	4.5/5
Electronic Gaming Monthly	8.17/10 (Note: In Electronic Gaming Monthly's review of the game, one critic gave it 8.5/10, and the rest gave it each a score of 8/10.)
EP Daily	8/10
Famitsu	34/40
Game Informer	8/10
GameSpot	7.6/10
GameSpy	85%
IGN	8.3/10
Next Generation	3/5
Official U.S. PlayStation Magazine	2.5/5

The game received "generally favorable reviews" according to the review aggregation website Metacritic. However, in his review of the game, Jeff Lundrigan of NextGen repeated the notion from his review of Tokyo Xtreme Racer 2 seven issues ago in saying that the Tokyo Xtreme Racer series "has its fans, and if we can understand the attraction, we don't share it." In Japan, Famitsu gave it a score of 34 out of 40. Jake The Snake of GamePro's website-only review said, "If you're a junky [sic] for driving games and tricked-out cars, you might like Tokyo Racer [sic]---but even you should rent this game before buying." (Note: GamePro gave the game two 4/5 scores for graphics and control, 3.5/5 for sound, and 2.5/5 for fun factor.)
