= Import Tuner Challenge =

2006 video game

- North American box art featuring a Toyota Supra
- Developer: Genki
- Publishers: JP: Genki; WW: Ubisoft
- Designer: Tomo Kimura
- Series: Tokyo Xtreme Racer
- Platform: Xbox 360
- Release: JP: July 27, 2006; NA: September 26, 2006; AU: October 5, 2006; EU: October 6, 2006
- Genre: Racing
- Modes: Single-player, multiplayer

Import Tuner Challenge (Note: Japanese: 首都高バトル X, Hepburn: Shutokō Battle X) is a 2006 racing game published by Ubisoft and developed by Genki for the Xbox 360. It is an installment in the long-running Shutokō Battle series of games known as Tokyo Xtreme Racer in North America and Tokyo Highway Challenge in Europe. This is the only Shutokou Battle game to be released on the Xbox 360.

== Plot ==
After the 13 Devils have been defeated once more in the Kaido Circuit, Motoya Iwasaki, aka Speed King, disappeared suddenly, leaving without a trace. Since then, many drivers from all across Japan come to Tokyo in order to have his title of "Speed King", especially the Japanese-American racer, Snake Eyes, and his team, Phantom 9, which later began an all-out assault on many teams in the Shuto Expressway following Speed King's absence, and his return to Tokyo, after five years of racing in America.

The player assumes the role of Ren Tennoji, Iwasaki's best friend, who sets out to defeat numerous teams and rivals, including Bloodhound, Midnight Cinderella and Platinum Prince, and much later on, Skull Bullet, an American racer who came to Tokyo in pursuit of Snake Eyes.

It is later revealed in the story by Bloodhound that Iwasaki disappeared from the Shutokou due to the passing of his girlfriend from a terminal illness three years prior to the events of the game, and went into hiding as he later became disillusioned with street racing and went on a major identity crisis as a result of her death.

Shortly after Tennoji defeats Snake Eyes, Iwasaki reveals himself as Speed King once more and thanks Tennoji for reviving his passion for racing, and decides to return to the Shuto Expressway once again. Tennoji later finishes off loose ends and eventually defeats Speed King and ultimately "???" (Unknown), solidifying his status as the best racer in the Shuto Expressway.

It is revealed in the sequel, Tokyo Xtreme Racer (2025), that Tennoji inherited the title of Speed King from Iwasaki.

== Gameplay ==
The player's objective in the game is to make a name of the player out on the highways of Tokyo. The player begins as an unknown driver and as the player progresses through the game by earning increasingly impressive nicknames or handles as they're called in the game.

The player begins the game with a small amount of currency before picking out the first car. When the player picks the first car, the player will begin a race against Iwasaki. The game features player versus player and a score meter called a spirit points bar.

== Reception ==
Reception

Aggregate scores
Aggregator	Score
GameRankings	52.77%
Metacritic	54/100

Review scores
Publication	Score
1Up.com	D+
GameSpot	6.4/10
GamesRadar+	2.5/5
IGN	5.9/10
Official Xbox Magazine (US)	4/10
TeamXbox	4.9/10
Detroit Free Press	3/4

While the Japanese release of the game was well-received by Famitsu, it garnered mixed to negative reception from Western publications. GameRankings gave it a score of 52.77%, while Metacritic gave it 54 out of 100.

TeamXbox's Nate Ahearn rated the game 4.9 out of 10, saying, "Tuning the numerous parts of your car provides for some decent variation, but you’ll soon figure out that the actual gameplay just isn't very good." IGN's Erik Brudvig criticized the AI for being too easy, saying, "They can be blown away on every turn with only minimal drifting and turning skills."
