= Michiharu Kusunoki =

Japanese manga artist from Tosa, Kōchi (born 1957)

Michiharu Kusunoki (Japanese: 楠 みちはる, Hepburn: Kusunoki Michiharu; born 25 January 1957) is a Japanese manga artist from Tosa, Kōchi. He is most known for the street racing series Wangan Midnight serialized in Kodansha's weekly Young Magazine and which has been adapted into a 26-episode anime series, a series of video games, and a movie.

Other manga series created by Michiharu Kusunoki include J Monogatari and Shakotan Boogie, also published by Kodansha.

== Works ==
- Aitsu to Lullaby (1981–1989, serialized in Weekly Shōnen Magazine, Kodansha)
- J Monogatari (1984-1985, Kodansha)
- Shakotan Boogie (1986–1996, serialized in Young Magazine, Kodansha)
- Sayonara December (1987, Kodansha)
- Wangan Midnight (1993–2008, serialized in Young Magazine, Kodansha)
- Tokyo Broker (2003, serialized in Morning, Kodansha)
- Wangan Midnight C1 Runner (2009–2012, serialized in Young Magazine, Kodansha)
- Eight (2012–2013, serialized in Young Magazine, Kodansha)
- Ginkai no Speed Star (2014–2015, serialized in Big Comic Spirits, Shogakukan)
- Kami-sama no Joker (as writer, with Mizu Sahara) (2015-2016, serialized in Evening, Kodansha)
- Shutoko SPL -Silver Ash Speedster- (2016-ongoing, serialized in Monthly Young Magazine, Kodansha)
