= Tokyo Xtreme Racer: Drift 2 =

2005 video game

Tokyo Xtreme Racer Drift 2
- North American cover art with a Toyota Supra
- Publishers: JP: Genki; EU: Konami; NA: Crave Entertainment
- Series: Tokyo Xtreme Racer
- Platform: PlayStation 2
- Release: JP: July 28, 2005; AU: October 27, 2006; EU: December 1, 2006; NA: April 17, 2007
- Genre: Racing
- Modes: Single-player, multiplayer

Tokyo Xtreme Racer Drift 2 (known as Kaido Battle: Touge no Densetsu (lit. Kaido: Legend of the Mountain Pass) in Japan and Kaido Racer 2 in PAL territories) is a racing game developed by Genki, released in 2005. It is the third installment in the Kaido Battle series, being a sequel to Kaidō Battle 2: Chain Reaction (known as Kaido Racer in Europe and Australia), and borrowing heavily from the influential Shutokō Battle series created by the same company.

== Overview ==
The game is about touge racing, made especially popular during the 2000s by media such as Initial D and The Fast and the Furious: Tokyo Drift.

Gameplay is divided into daytime and nighttime. During the day, the player participates in legally sanctioned races and time trials to earn money. At night however, the player instead can challenge and be challenged to various types of duel matches, such as a one-on-one battles, drift events and time attacks, to increase their reputation. The player can buy a used or new stock car, tune it with aerodynamic and engine parts, and get sponsorships which pay more money. The car list features over 200 cars, containing many types of vehicles, from small kei cars to hardcore sports cars. Most of the cars featured are licensed Japanese cars, with some additional European import cars.

== Gameplay ==
=== Career ===
The career mode (or Conquest mode in the game as it is called) features a single driver (with name provided by the player, default name is "k_taro") on their quest to become the best racer in the Osaka Prefecture area. The player, depending on the first three letters of the name they enter, which would correspond to the first three digits, starts with anywhere between 1,700,000 and 2,990,000 CP to buy a car. The Conquest mode has been significantly changed from the first game, with several new real-life locations being added. Hakone and Haruna return from the original game, while several new locations, like Shiga Kusatsu, Hiroshima, Nikko and Mount Rokkō (divided into two roads, Ura and Omote) were added.

With the original tracks in the game, a new option in the game has been added, that being "Short Courses". There are only eight short courses in the game, which, in line with their name, are much shorter than the normal courses. These courses must be unlocked by winning a special invitation event, which is done by beating a significant opponent in the game and winning a number of prizes. Several sponsors and many high-stakes drivers are on short courses, and several drivers from the original Tokyo Xtreme Racer are featured in short courses.

Tuning of the car was significantly changed as well. The sequel features vinyls which can be put on the car, although the sticker scheme has been changed and now only one sticker of the team can be applied to the car. Several body modification changes were made, with the ability to add mudflaps, custom hoods and spoilers, as well as carbon fiber parts. Performance tuning lets the player choose which manufacturer to install a part from, which have varying effects on the car's performance. Naturally aspirated engines can be turbocharged, and also shifted back to natural aspiration. However, turbocharged cars from the factory cannot have their turbos removed.

As with the original, the goal is to defeat all "Slashers" (bosses) to win the game. Unlike in the first game, a course only has one Slasher, and number of Supporter drivers (more powerful drivers, serving as a prelude to a Slasher) have been added. Slashers drive special vehicles with unique body kits, paint and stickers. In Conquest mode, the player has the ability to unlock some special cars as well to buy them, which have custom body kits, paint jobs, vinyls and rims. Every driver in the game have their own biography, often with a comedic tone, as well as their own unique car. The player can participate in bets during races, with the ability to win car parts or new vehicles.

Category races have been changed as well, consisting of three types: Standard Races, Advanced Races and Gymkhana. Standard Races allow the player to progress through levels, which in turn allows the player to race in Advanced Races. Advanced Races have special medal prizes, which can unlock some new equipment, new cars and also short courses. Gymkhana features a parking lot with cones, where the player must score the most points to win.

The game's plot revolves around two racing teams, Thirteen Devils and Kingdom Twelve. Thirteen Devils is a team from Tokyo, seeking to dominate the racing scene. They are a group of thirteen drivers with high-performance cars, all of them having a distinctive yellow paint job and custom vinyls. Opposed to them are Kingdom Twelve, a group of twelve professional racers who race to "protect" their courses. They also bear custom vinyls and high-end performance cars. During the course of the game, the player will have opportunities to race drivers from both groups, and they are regularly mentioned during the game via messaging.

The game's story consists of four stages. Each Stage features a set of locations, and usually only one has to be beaten in order to advance to the next Stage. As Slashers are beaten and new locations are unlocked, new cars, sponsors and car parts are unlocked. Regardless, every event must be beaten to achieve 100% story completion.

=== Vehicles ===
The game features a selection of 218 licensed Japanese and European cars. There are also several parodies of cars from anime and manga titles like Initial D, Wangan Midnight and Over Rev!. Unlike past games in the franchise, American manufacturers have been completely omitted.

== Game modes ==
The game features many modes, many of which appear in the Conquest mode:

=== Standard Challenges ===
- SP challenge: Standard race between two rivals, featuring health bars that represent their SP (Spirit Points). The leading racer in front drains SP from the trailing racer, increasing with the distance between them. SP is also lost by colliding with walls and/or obstacles.
- SA challenge: Touge race between the two rivals, with the player at the back. This mode does not feature health bars, but the race can be won regardless by getting ahead of the rival far enough.
- TF challenge: Touge race between two rivals. The player starts in the leading position, and has to finish the race first to win.
- TA challenge: Standard Time attack challenge, with the objective being to beat the rival's record.
- CA challenge: Time attack, but it also features a drift mode in which the player has to beat the rival's time record and also score more drift points than the rival.
- TAC challenge: Time attack challenge, but the player has a health bar that will be reduced if they collide into walls.
- CAT challenge: Drift challenge, in which the player has to score points on each turn. The player will automatically lose the points if they crash or fail to score enough.

=== Category Races ===
Category races were also featured in the original game, and return with some changes:

- Category race: The object of the race is to score a number of points given through drifting so the player can win the money. Drifting can score a combo which continuously increases, as long as they scores more than 1000 points in each section.
- Gymkhana: A new option in the game, which is divided into TA and CA challenges. TA Challenge is a time attack on a gymkhana course, where the player must complete the route within a given time. CA Challenge also features a number of drift points that have to be scored with the given amount of time.
- Advanced races: The player is required to own a specific type of engine or car in order to enter the race. Each destination has unique events and have much bigger cash prizes, and unlock special medals.

== Reception ==
Reception

Aggregate scores
Aggregator	Score
GameRankings	52.12%
Metacritic	46/100

Review scores
Publication	Score
GameSpot	5.2/10
GamesRadar+	3/5
IGN	4/10
X-Play	1/5

The game was met with mixed reception upon release, as GameRankings gave it a score of 52.12%, while Metacritic gave it 46 out of 100.
