= Tokyo Xtreme Racer =

- Logo of the 2025 title
- Genre: Racing
- Developer: Genki
- Publishers: Crave Entertainment, Jaleco, THQ, Ubisoft, Konami
- Creator: Genki
- First release: Shutokō Battle '94: Drift King; 1994
- Latest release: Tokyo Xtreme Racer; 2025

Tokyo Xtreme Racer (東京エクストリームレーサー, Tōkyō Ekusutorīmu Rēsā), also known as Shutokō Battle (首都高バトル, Shutokōbatoru; lit. "Metropolitan Expressway Battle") in Japan, is an arcade-style racing video game series created by Genki, inspired by street racing on the Shuto Expressway in Tokyo. Its first installment, Shutokō Battle '94: Drift King, was released in 1994 for the Super Famicom, while the latest installment is Tokyo Xtreme Racer, which released in early access on PC on 23rd January 2025, and is the series' first major entry in 18 years.

While the series was most commonly localized under the name Tokyo Xtreme Racer, when published by Crave Entertainment and by Genki themselves, other publishers have given certain installments entirely different English names, such as Tokyo Highway Battle when published by Jaleco and THQ International; Import Tuner Challenge by Ubisoft; and even Street Supremacy when released by Konami. There is also a sub-series named Kaido Battle which focuses on Touge racing and drifting.

== Gameplay ==
The Tokyo Xtreme Racer series focuses on highway street racing, primarily inspired by the underground Wangan racing scene in real-world Japanese expressways such as the Shuto Expressway and the Bayshore Route in the 1990s, where players took control of a lone street racer aiming to be the best in the underground Wangan racing scene.

The main unique racing mechanic of the series is the "SP Battle" system, where each competitor has a "Spirit Point" (SP) gauge that depletes when they fall behind or hit obstacles. The goal is to drain the opponent's SP bar to zero by maintaining a lead or forcing the opponent into mistakes while preserving your own gauge. Races end when either gauge depletes or when a significant distance is achieved between the two cars.

Racers can freely roam the highways to challenge opponents, who are typically part of rival teams or lone "wanderers." Challenges are initiated by flashing headlights at nearby vehicles. Winning races earn money, which can be used to upgrade the car's performance, enhance visual customization, or unlock new vehicles. The series' progression system revolves around defeating specific rivals and bosses, ultimately culminating in showdowns with elite racers.

== History ==
Release timeline
1994	Shutokō Battle '94
1995	Shutokō Battle 2 Highway 2000
1996	Tōge Densetsu: Saisoku Battle; Tokyo Highway Battle; Wangan Dead Heat Plus Real Arrange; Shutokō Battle Gaiden
1997	Shutokō Battle '97; Shutokō Battle R
1998	Kattobi Tune
1999	Tokyo Xtreme Racer
2000	Tokyo Xtreme Racer 2
2001	Tokyo Xtreme Racer: Zero; Shutokō Battle H"
2002	Shutokō Battle I Shutokō Battle EZ; Shutokō Battle (mobile)
2003	Shutokō Battle Online; Tokyo Xtreme Racer Drift; Tokyo Xtreme Racer 3 Shutokō Battle Online Special Pack
2004	Kaidō Battle 2: Chain Reaction
2005	Shutokō Battle Evolution; Tokyo Xtreme Racer Advance; Street Supremacy; Racing Battle: C1 Grand Prix; Tokyo Xtreme Racer: Drift 2 Shutokō Battle Evolution Plus
2006	Shutokō Battle Evolution; Import Tuner Challenge
2007
2008
2009
2010
2011	Shutokō Battle (mobile)
2012
2013
2014
2015
2016
2017	Shutokō Battle Xtreme (mobile)
2018
2019
2020
2021
2022
2023
2024
2025	Tokyo Xtreme Racer

The series was originally subtitled "Drift King", after the trademark nickname of street racing and professional racing driver Keiichi Tsuchiya who is featured in the first Shuto Kousoku Trial episodes and endorsed the game with, then team manager, Masaki Bandoh of Bandoh Racing Project.

=== Sega Saturn spin-offs ===
During the 1990s, Genki produced a highway drift/adult content (omitted in the localization Highway 2000) oriented Shutokou Battle spin-off series for the Sega Saturn, Wangan Dead Heat, and a circuit/tune edition unique episode for the PlayStation, Kattobi Tune, which oriented the Shutokou Battle series through a new direction, leading to the Dreamcast version and its worldwide recognition and distribution. Kattobi Tune was compiled under the supervision of Rev Speed, a popular Japanese car tuning magazine and features seven licensed professional tuners, RE Amemiya, Spoon, Mine's, Trial, "RS Yamamoto", Garage Saurus and JUN Auto, appearing years later in Racing Battle: C1 Grand Prix and also in the influential Gran Turismo series by Polyphony Digital.

=== Chronology of Tokyo Xtreme Racer console games ===
Though the entire Shutokou Battle series has been referred to as the "Tokyo Xtreme Racer" series in the west, only a subset of games had an official "Tokyo Xtreme Racer" title attached. The games also received different names in different regions, adding to confusion.

The chronology and regional name variants of "Tokyo Xtreme Racer" console games
Original Japanese Title	Year (JPN)	US Title	PAL Title	Console	Note
Shutokō Battle 首都高バトル	1999	Tokyo Xtreme Racer	Tokyo Highway Challenge	DC	
Shutokō Battle 2 首都高バトル 2	2000	Tokyo Xtreme Racer 2	Tokyo Highway Challenge 2	DC	
Shutokō Battle 0 首都高バトル0	2001	Tokyo Xtreme Racer: Zero	Tokyo Xtreme Racer	PS2	PAL region name not to be confused with earlier "Tokyo Xtreme Racer" (1999) in US region on Sega Dreamcast.
Kaidō Battle: Nikko, Haruna, Rokko, Hakone 街道バトル 〜日光・榛名・六甲・箱根〜	2003 (Feb)	Tokyo Xtreme Racer: Drift (2006)	Not released.	PS2	Kaidō Battle sub-series, 1st entry
Shutokō Battle 01 首都高バトル01	2003 (July)	Tokyo Xtreme Racer 3	Not released.	PS2	
Kaidō Battle 2: Chain Reaction 街道バトル2 CHAIN REACTION	2004	Not released.	Kaido Racer (2005)	PS2	Kaidō Battle sub-series, 2nd entry
Kaidō: Tōge no Densetsu; KAIDO 峠の伝説	2005	Tokyo Xtreme Racer: Drift 2 (2007)	Kaido Racer 2 (2006)	PS2	Kaidō Battle sub-series, 3rd entry

=== Kaidō Battle ===
Kaidō Battle (街道バトル, Kaidōbatoru, lit. "Highway Battle") is a spin-off series for the PlayStation 2 created by Genki. They are focused on Touge racing and heavily centered on drifting. The franchise currently has three games, with two of them being released in North America under the Tokyo Xtreme Racer banner by Crave Entertainment.

The series, like the main Shutokou Battle games, includes licensed cars and authentic Japanese mountain roads as courses. In Conquest Mode, the player competes during the day in drift contests, earning more points for holding a drift longer or for a quick combination of drifts, but earns no points if the player bumps against the wall or a guard rail. Doing this, the player earns money to buy new cars and modifications. Daytime racing also features racing for sponsors, which includes a kind of racing challenge determined by the sponsor. Beating a sponsor challenge earns the player a sponsor. Sponsors give the player better parts and extra bonuses for winning drift contests.

At night, the player can challenge rivals in the parking lot, and race them in a vein similar to Shutokō Battle/Tokyo Xtreme Racer: the first one to have their life bar depleted loses; however, the first racer to cross the finish line will win the race. Through the night, the player will face the "Tricksters", a type of mini-bosses in the course. After all the Tricksters have been beaten, the main boss of the course (called the "Slasher") will challenge the player through an in-game BBS system. After the Slasher has been beaten, the player may advance to the next stage. The final boss in the last course is called the "Emotional King."

The story unfolds in Kaido Battle when Hiroki Koukami challenges and defeat all Slashers, including Motoya Iwasaki, the Speed King from Shutokou Battle, until he challenges Hamagaki, the Kaido President & 1st Emotional King in his yellow Pantera GTS at Irohazaka. By doing so, Koukami becomes the new Emotional King, while Hamagaki becomes a Trickster.

In Kaido Battle 2: Chain Reaction, Tatsu Zoushigaya arrives at the age of just 18. Like Koukami, he beats all Slashers and eventually Koukami himself in his Lancer Evolution 3 at Aso, Hamagaki in his Genki S2000 Turbo, as well as the secret rival Ground Zero Kazioka in his Skyline GT-R. But since he was defeated, Koukami moves away to Hokkaido and the Kaido Circuit spirals into chaos.

To fix it, in Kaido: Tōge no Densetsu, Zoushigaya becomes the Miracles Summit and now drives a black Subaru Impreza Prototype Rally Car and Kyoichi Imaizumi, Zao's Slasher, becomes the Absolute Emperor and drives a white Renault Clio V6 Phase 2. These drivers are now the fastest on the Kaido Circuit. Meanwhile, the 13 Devils from Tokyo led by Iwasaki come to the Kaido Circuit and have the intention to conquer it. In order to protect the circuit from the Devils, they create another team: The Kingdom Twelve. At the beginning, their leader's identity is unknown.

This time, the hero is also unknown and is able to beat everyone, even Imaizumi and Zoushigaya. By beating them, he is able to defeat the members of the Kingdom Twelve & the 13 Devils. By e-mails, the Kingdom Twelve's leader's identity is known after he beats Timberslash: Hamagaki. After beating him and Iwasaki, the hero battles Koukami and beats him. And after these events, the truth is revealed: Hamagaki was still angry since he lost his title as the Emotional King.

Thus, in Kaido Battle 2: Chain Reaction, he challenged every rival and eventually challenged Koukami again at Aso. But Koukami won again, making Hamagaki angrier than ever. Eventually, since Iwasaki became depressed, Hamagaki cajoled him to race into the Kaido Circuit, but by doing so, he manipulated him, and lies to everyone saying that his team protects the Circuit from the Devils, while the Devils didn't know his real goal: to found the fastest Rally Team and Highway Team.

Games in the Kaidō Battle sub-series

- Kaidō Battle (2003). Released in North America as Tokyo Xtreme Racer: Drift in 2006.
- Kaidō Battle 2: Chain Reaction (2004). Released in Europe as Kaido Racer in 2005. Not released in North America.
- Kaidō Battle: Legend of the Mountain Pass (2005). Released in North America as Tokyo Xtreme Racer: Drift 2 in 2007, released in Europe as Kaido Racer 2 in 2006.

=== Drifting ===
The D1 Grand Prix drifting championship inspired the new series Racing Battle: C1 Grand Prix, released in 2005 and remembering the 1997 drift circuit based Shutokou Battle Gaiden and the continuation of the "Shutokou Battle circuit + RPG" concept introduced in Kattobi Tune, a genre close to the Zero4 Champ series by Media Rings.

The first and only episode has the tagline "C1 Grand Prix", which is a double reference to the D1 GP and the Route C1, the latter being the Inner Circular Route of the Shuto Expressway and the circuit for most episodes of the Shutokō Battle series.

=== The Fast and the Furious ===
Genki was also developing a game related although not part of the Shotoku Battle series, The Fast and the Furious, based on the movie franchise of the same name. It was presented at E3 2003 and conceived as an open world game. The game was planned to be published by Vivendi Universal Games and release on PlayStation 2 in late 2003 and the Xbox in 2004. However, it was eventually cancelled.

== List of Tokyo Xtreme Racer games ==
Overseas title	Japanese title	Original release date (YYYY/MM) (Note: Initial release in Japan stated. Other overseas releases are only stated if they are not in the same year.)	Platforms	Developer	Publisher
-	Shutokō Battle '94 Keiichi Tsuchiya Drift King	1994/05/27	Super Famicom	Genki	Bullet-Proof Software
-	Shutokō Battle 2: Drift King Keiichi Tsuchiya & Masaaki Bandoh	1995/02/24	Super Famicom	Genki	Bullet-Proof Software
-	Tōge Densetsu: Saisoku Battle	1996/03/22	Super Famicom	Genki	Bullet-Proof Software
Tokyo Highway Battle	Shutokō Battle: Drift King - Keichii Tsuchiya & Masaaki Bandoh	1996/05/03	PlayStation	Genki	Bullet-Proof Software^{JP} Jaleco^{NA/EU} THQ^{EU}
-	Shutokō Battle Gaiden: Super Technic Challenge - Road To Drift King	1996/12/20	PlayStation	Mitsui	Media Quest
-	Shutokō Battle '97: Drift King Keichii Tsuchiya & Masaaki Bandoh - New Limited Ver.97	1997/02/28	Sega Saturn	Genki	Imagineer SPD2
-	Shutoku Battle R	1997/04/25	PlayStation	Genki	Genki
-	Kattobi Tune (spin-off)	1998/04/23	PlayStation	Genki	Genki
Tokyo Xtreme Racer^{NA} Tokyo Highway Challenge^{PAL}	Shutokō Battle	1999/06/24	Dreamcast	Genki	Genki^{JP} Crave Entertainment^{NA/EU} Ubi Soft^{EU}
Tokyo Xtreme Racer 2^{NA} Tokyo Highway Challenge 2^{PAL}	Shutokō Battle 2	2000/06/22	Dreamcast	Genki	Genki^{JP} Crave Entertainment^{NA/EU} Ubi Soft^{EU}
Tokyo Xtreme Racer: Zero^{NA} Tokyo Xtreme Racer^{PAL}	Shutokō Battle 0	2001/03/15	PlayStation 2	Genki	Genki^{JP} Crave Entertainment^{NA/EU} Ubi Soft^{EU}
Wangan Midnight^{NA(arcade)}	Wangan Midnight (Note: Officially a different game and series, but in terms of mechanics and assets is a Shutokō Battle / Tokyo Xtreme Racer game.)	2002/03/28	PlayStation 2^{JP}, Namco System 246^{NA/JP(arcade)}	Genki	Genki^{JP(PS2)} Namco^{NA/JP(arcade)}
-	Shutokō Battle Online	2003/01/09	Microsoft Windows	Genki Racing Project	Genki
Tokyo Xtreme Racer: Drift^{NA}	Kaidō Battle: Nikko, Haruna, Rokko, Hakone	2003/02/27 (JP); 2006/4/18 (NA)	PlayStation 2	Genki Racing Project	Genki^{JP} Crave Entertainment^{NA}
Tokyo Xtreme Racer 3^{NA}	Shutokō Battle 01	2003/07/24	PlayStation 2	Genki Racing Project	Genki^{JP} Crave Entertainment^{NA}
-	Shutokō Battle Online Special Pack "SpeedMaster"	2003/08/06	Microsoft Windows	DigiCube, Genki Racing Project	
Kaido Racer^{PAL}	Kaidō Battle 2: Chain Reaction	2004/02/26	PlayStation 2	Genki Racing Project	Konami
Tokyo Xtreme Racer Advance	-	2005/04/20	Game Boy Advance	David A. Palmer Productions	Crave Entertainment^{PAL}
Street Supremacy^{NA/PAL}	Shutokō Battle	2005/04/21	PlayStation Portable	Genki Racing Project	Konami
-	Racing Battle: C1 Grand Prix	2005/05/26	PlayStation 2	Genki Racing Project	Genki
Tokyo Xtreme Racer: Drift 2^{NA} Kaido Racer 2^{PAL}	Kaidō Battle: Tōge no Densetsu	2005/07/28 (JP); 2006/12/01 (PAL); 2007/04/17 (NA)	PlayStation 2	Genki Racing Project	Genki^{JP} Crave Entertainment^{NA} Konami^{PAL}
Import Tuner Challenge^{NA/PAL}	Shutokō Battle Ten (Shutokou Battle X)	2006/07/27	Xbox 360	Genki Racing Project	Genki^{JP} Ubisoft^{NA/PAL}
-	Wangan Midnight	2007/07/26	PlayStation 3	Genki	Genki
-	Wangan Midnight Portable	2007/09/27	PlayStation Portable	Genki	Genki
Tokyo Xtreme Racer	Shutokō Battle	2025/01/23 (Early Access Version), 2025/09/25 (Final Version)	PlayStation 5, Windows	Genki	Genki
Overseas title	Japanese title	Original release date (YYYY/MM)	Platforms	Developer	Publisher

=== Mobile phone titles ===
These are exclusive to Japan.

Japanese title	Original release date (YYYY/MM)	Platforms	Developer
Shutokō Battle H	2001	Feel H Mobile	Genki Mobile
Shutokō Battle I (J)	2002/02	i-mode Mobile	Genki Mobile
Shutokō Battle EZ	2002/02	EZweb	Genki Mobile
Shutokō Battle	2002/??	Vodafone live!	Genki Mobile
UnderGroundRacing	2005/??	i-mode	Genki Mobile
Kaidō Battle Cross Action FIRST STAGE	2005	i-mode	Genki Mobile
Shutokō Battle Evolution	2005/04/04	i-mode	Genki Mobile
Shutokō Battle Evolution Plus (2)	2005/09/06	i-mode	Genki Mobile
Shutokō Battle Evolution	2006/01/26	EZweb	Genki Mobile
Kaidō Battle Cross Action SECOND STAGE	2006/06/05	i-mode	Genki Mobile
DRAG⇒400	2006/??	i-mode / EZweb	Genki Mobile
Shutokō Battle Car Sensor Version	2007/03/22	i-mode	Genki Mobile
Shutokō Battle DRAG2	2007/10/?	i-mode	Genki Mobile
Intuition☆Shutokō Battle	2007/??	i-mode	Genki Mobile
Intuition☆Shutokō Battle Bayshore Line	2007/??	i-mode	Genki Mobile
Intuition☆Shutokō Battle New Loop Line	2007/11/12	i-mode	Genki Mobile
UriKiri: Shutokō Battle Evolution -Sakai Line-	2008/03/17	i-mode	Genki Mobile
Shutokō Battle Neo	2008/09/18	EZweb / i-mode	Genki Mobile
Shutokō Battle Emotion	2009/09/01	i-mode	Genki Mobile
Shutokō Battle	2011/11/01	Mobage	Genki
Shutokō Battle A	2011/??	Android	Genki Mobile
Shutokō Battle Xtreme	2017/01/26	Android / iOS	Genki

== See also ==
- Shuto Expressway
- Shuto Kōsoku Trial
- Wangan Midnight (2007 video game)
- Initial D
- The Fast and the Furious (2001 film)
- Import scene
