= Wangan Midnight =

Japanese manga series

- First tankōbon volume cover, featuring Akio Asakura and the Devil Z

湾岸ミッドナイト (Wangan Middonaito)
- Genre: Sports (highway racing)
- Manga
- Written by: Michiharu Kusunoki
- Published by: Shogakukan; Kodansha
- Magazine: Big Comic Spirits; (1990); Weekly Young Magazine; (1992–2008)
- Original run: 1990 – 2008
- Volumes: 42
- Anime television series
- Directed by: Tsuneo Tominaga
- Studio: A.C.G.T
- Original network: Animax
- Original run: June 8, 2007 – September 13, 2008
- Episodes: 26
- Manga

Wangan Midnight: C1 Runner
- Written by: Michiharu Kusunoki
- Published by: Kodansha
- Magazine: Weekly Young Magazine
- Original run: August 4, 2008 – July 9, 2012
- Volumes: 12
- Manga

Ginkai no Speed Star
- Written by: Michiharu Kusunoki
- Published by: Shogakukan
- Magazine: Big Comic Spirits
- Original run: August 11, 2014 – April 13, 2015
- Volumes: 2
- Manga

Shutoko SPL – Ginkai no Speedster
- Written by: Michiharu Kusunoki
- Published by: Kodansha
- Magazine: Monthly Young Magazine
- Original run: September 20, 2016 – present
- Volumes: 12
- icon

Wangan Midnight (Japanese: 湾岸ミッドナイト, Hepburn: Wangan Middonaito) is a Japanese racing manga series written and illustrated by Michiharu Kusunoki. It was first serialized in Shogakukan's Big Comic Spirits in 1990, but was later serialized in Kodansha's Weekly Young Magazine from 1992 to 2008. The manga was compiled into 42 volumes published by Kodansha. A second manga series titled Wangan Midnight: C1 Runner was published from 2008 to 2012. A third manga series, Ginkai no Speed Star, was published from 2014 to 2015. A fourth manga series, Shutoko SPL – Ginkai no Speedster, started in 2016.

The series has been adapted into several live action feature films, video games, and an anime television series. The anime was broadcast in Japan from June 2007 to September 2008 on the anime satellite television network Animax, animated by A.C.G.T and produced by OB Planning.

In 1999, Wangan Midnight won the 23rd Kodansha Manga Award in the general category.

== Plot ==
The series revolves around street racing on Tokyo's Bayshore Route (湾岸, Wangan), as well as other roads on the Shuto Expressway network. The story begins with high-school student Akio Asakura encountering a black Porsche 911 Turbo nicknamed "Blackbird" on the Wangan. Akio attempts to give chase, but is unable to keep up with the Blackbird, which is driven by a medical doctor named Tatsuya Shima.

Determined to drive a faster car, Akio visits a junkyard and is drawn to an old blue Nissan Fairlady Z (S30) with a highly tuned L28 engine. He learns that the car is supposedly "cursed," being extremely difficult to drive and having a history of multiple accidents, earning it the name "The Devil Z" (悪魔のZ, Akuma no Zetto). This does not dissuade him, and he restores the car back to its former glory. When racing with Blackbird, Akio tries to win, only to crash multiple times. He also gets to meet Eriko Asakura, the sister of the original driver who shares the same name as the current Akio, who previously died in a car accident while racing with Blackbird.

As he develops his career as the infamous owner of the Devil Z, Akio meets many other racers and tuners along the way, such as fashion model and TV host Reina Akikawa, who drives a grey (later white) Nissan Skyline GT-R (R32), and Jun Kitami, the original creator of the infamous Devil Z and Blackbird. The central plot revolves around the rivalry between the Devil Z and Blackbird for Wangan superiority as Akio tries to maintain his loyalty with the car and control it from crashing, with other racers trying to compete against both of them who are also seeking to oust their record.

The new story arc, Wangan Midnight: C1 Runner, features the new adventures of a new main character, Shinji Ogishima (who debuted in the last chapters of the original manga), and his friend, Nobu Setoguchi. They are part of the GT Cars project, which is in dispute and conflict, and must drive Mazda RX-7's along Shuto Expressway to settle these problems along with meeting Tatsuya Shima.

== Characters ==
Akio Asakura (朝倉アキオ, Asakura Akio)
Voiced by: Shun Oguri
Akio is a skilled racer who began competing at a young age. During his final year of high school, he drives a red Nissan Fairlady Z (Z31) before encountering the "Devil Z", a 620 hp (460 kW) Nissan Fairlady Z (S30) notorious for its supernatural speed and near-uncontrollable handling. After losing to Tatsuya Shima's Blackbird, he switches to the Devil Z, becoming a legendary figure on the Wangan despite his humble demeanor.
Tatsuya Shima (島達也, Shima Tatsuya)
Voiced by: Shin-ichiro Miki
Tatsuya Shima is a skilled surgeon and Akio's primary rival, being one of the few who can match him in races. He initially drives a black Porsche 911 Turbo (930), later upgrading to a black Porsche 911 Turbo (964) nicknamed "Blackbird"—a reference to the RUF CTR "Yellowbird". Using his substantial income, Shima funds his high-performance Porsches and eventually commissions Jun Kitami, the builder of the Devil Z, to modify his car, boosting its output to 700 hp (520 kW) in an effort to compete with Akio's machine.
Reina Akikawa (秋川零奈, Akikawa Reina)
Voiced by: Reiko Suhō
Reina is a model and television host who co-anchors the automotive show Drive Go-Go! After encountering Akio and the Devil Z on the Wangan, she becomes fascinated with both, even attempting to steal the car one night. She later modifies her R32 Nissan Skyline GT-R at YM Speed, sparking a passion for street racing—much to her manager's dismay. Initially a rival, she crashes her Skyline while racing Akio, leading to a friendship and unrequited romantic feelings. She eventually stops competing, instead spectating races in her R32 or accompanying Akio as a supporter.

== Media ==
=== Manga ===
Written and illustrated by Michiharu Kusunoki, Wangan Midnight was first briefly published in Shogakukan's Big Comic Spirits in 1990 and transferred to Kodansha's Weekly Young Magazine, where it ran from 1992 to 2008. Kodansha collected its chapters in 42 tankōbon volumes, published from January 8, 1993, to December 26, 2008.

A second series, titled Wangan Midnight: C1 Runner, was serialized in Weekly Young Magazine from August 4, 2008, to July 9, 2012. (Note: It started in the combined 36/37 issue of 2008, released on August 4, 2008.) Kodansha collected its chapters in twelve tankōbon volumes, published between November 6, 2009, and October 5, 2012.

A third series, titled Ginkai no Speed Star, was serialized in Weekly Big Comic Spirits from August 11, 2014, to April 13, 2015. Shogakukan collected its chapters in two tankōbon volumes, published on November 28, 2014, and May 29, 2015.

A fourth series, titled Shutoko SPL – Ginkai no Speedster, started in Kodansha's Monthly Young Magazine on September 20, 2016. Kodansha has collected its chapters into individual tankōbon volumes. The first volume was published on January 5, 2018. As of September 19, 2024, twelve volumes have been released.

=== Films ===
The series was adapted into a series of direct-to-video movies in 1991, 1993, 1994, 1998 and 2001, and a theatrical movie in 2009:

- Wangan Midnight (湾岸ミッドナイト), 1991
- Wangan Midnight II (湾岸ミッドナイトII), 1993
- Wangan Midnight III (湾岸ミッドナイトIII), 1993
- Wangan Midnight 4 (湾岸ミッドナイト4), 1993
- Wangan Midnight Special Director's Cut Complete Edition (湾岸ミッドナイト スペシャル ディレクターズカット完全版), 1994
- Wangan Midnight Final: GT-R Legend – Act 1 (湾岸ミッドナイト FINAL ~GT-R伝説 ACT1~), 1994
- Wangan Midnight Final: GT-R Legend – Act 2 (湾岸ミッドナイト FINAL ~GT-R伝説 ACT2~), 1994
- Devil GT-R Full Tuning (魔王GT-R チューニングのすべて), 1994
- Showdown! Devil GT-R (対決!魔王GT-R), 1994
- Wangan Midnight S30 vs. Gold GT-R – Part I (新湾岸ミッドナイト S30 vs. ゴールドGT-R Part I), 1998
- Wangan Midnight S30 vs. Gold GT-R – Part II (新湾岸ミッドナイト S30 vs. ゴールドGT-R Part II), 1998
- Wangan Midnight Return (湾岸ミッドナイト リターン), 2001
- Wangan Midnight The Movie (湾岸ミッドナイト・ザ・ムービー), 2009

=== Anime ===
At the 2007 Tokyo Anime Fair, OB Planning announced the production of an animated series based on the manga. The series was co-produced by OB Planning, A.C.G.T., and Pastel, under the direction of Tsuneo Tominaga. It aired for 26 episodes on a pay-per-view channel of Animax from June to September 2007. The opening theme for the series is "Lights and Anymore" by TRF and the ending theme is "Talkin' Bout Good Days" by Mother Ninja.

=== Video games ===
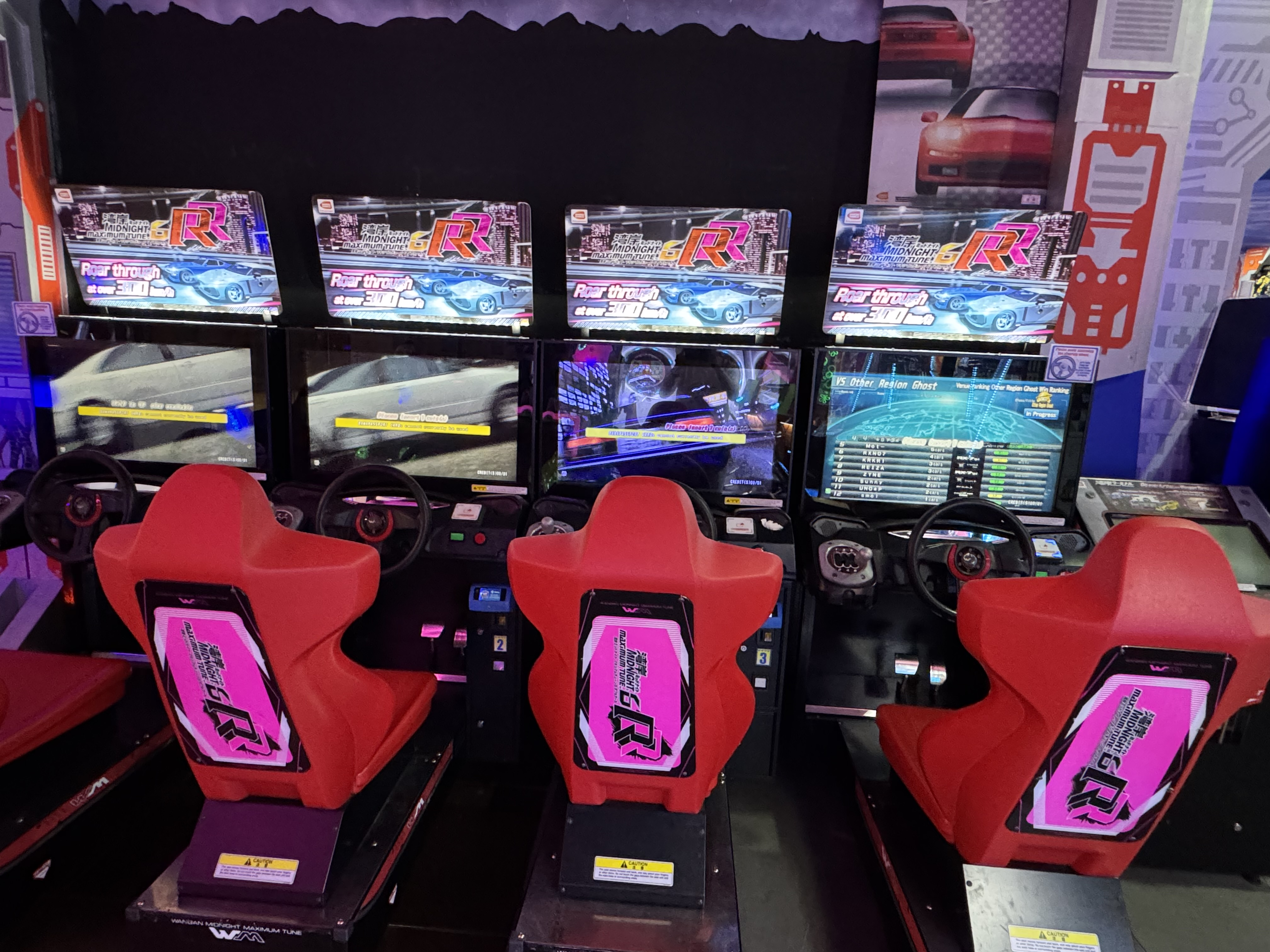
Wangan Midnight Maximum Tune 6RR arcades at Shangri-La Plaza

- Wangan Midnight – Developed by Genki and released on December 18, 2001, for arcade (by Namco, using the Namco System 246 hardware), and for the PlayStation 2 on March 21, 2002, by Genki.
  - Wangan Midnight R – Released for arcade in April 2002.
- Wangan Midnight – Released in 2007 for the PlayStation 3 and PlayStation Portable (as Wangan Midnight Portable) platforms. The games were re-released in 2008, under the "Genki The Best" label.
- Wangan Midnight Maximum Tune – Series of arcade games developed by Bandai Namco Amusement. The first entry was released on July 6, 2004.
  - Wangan Midnight Maximum Tune 2 – April 25, 2005
  - Wangan Midnight Maximum Tune 3 – July 18, 2007
  - Wangan Midnight Maximum Tune 3 DX – December 16, 2008
  - Wangan Midnight Maximum Tune 3 DX Plus – March 4, 2010
  - Wangan Midnight Maximum Tune 4 – December 15, 2011
  - Wangan Midnight Maximum Tune 5 – March 12, 2014
  - Wangan Midnight Maximum Tune 5 DX – December 15, 2015
  - Wangan Midnight Maximum Tune 5 DX Plus – December 15, 2016
  - Wangan Midnight Maximum Tune 6 – July 12, 2018
  - Wangan Midnight Maximum Tune 6R – January 21, 2020
  - Wangan Midnight Maximum Tune 6RR – November 17, 2021
  - Wangan Midnight Maximum Tune 6RR+ – April 17, 2024, in Japan only
  - Wangan Midnight Maximum Tune Ignition – TBD

== Reception ==
In 1999, Wangan Midnight won the 23rd Kodansha Manga Award in the general category.
