= Tokyo Xtreme Racer: Drift =

2003 video game

- North American box art, featuring a Nissan Skyline GT-R (foreground) and a Toyota Supra (background)
- Developer: Genki
- Publishers: JP: Genki; NA: Crave Entertainment
- Director: Nobukazu Itabashi
- Series: Tokyo Xtreme Racer
- Platform: PlayStation 2
- Release: JP: February 27, 2003; NA: April 18, 2006
- Genre: Racing
- Modes: Single-player, multiplayer

Tokyo Xtreme Racer: Drift (known as Kaidō Battle: Nikko, Haruna, Rokko, Hakone in Japan) is a 2003 racing game developed and published by Genki for the PlayStation 2. It is the fourth main installment in Shutokō Battle series. The game allows racing at both day and night. Daytime offers the opportunity to enter competitions and gain money, while night time is where the player can race against rivals to gain respect.

== Gameplay ==
=== Story ===
The game takes place in the year 20XX A.D. Huge, sweeping advances in infrastructure have led to mountain passes being on the decline, and gradually fell out of use. In an effort to salvage them and revitalize both the motorsports industry and the regional economy, the Japanese government has reintroduced them as public race courses.

The player assumes the role of "Forever Knights" Daiki Kōnoue, a mysterious driver who makes his debut as a mere rookie racer of the mountain passes. The game follows his career, besting rival after rival, making waves throughout the various mountain passes. Eventually, he challenges Hamagaki, aka Kaido President, who drives a yellow Pantera GTS (a black Acura NSX in the US version) and holds the title of "Emotional King", marking his place as the very best of the mountain pass racers. After Koukami defeats him, he takes his title, becoming the new Emotional King.

The game is set before the first Tokyo Xtreme Racer title, according to the Japanese series timeline.

=== Cars ===
The game includes Japanese and imported foreign cars. The foreign cars included are Alfa Romeo, Mini, Lotus, De Tomaso, and Volkswagen, depending on the version. Honda was licensed in this game (with some cars localized as Acura models in the US version) but was not available in Tokyo Xtreme Racer 3 due to licensing issues. Ford, Lotus, and De Tomaso were removed in the 2006 US release, and Alfa Romeo and Audi from Kaido Battle 2: Chain Reaction were added in, even though Kaido Battle 2 never had a North American release.

== Development ==
The game was originally conceived as Touge Battle and was planned to be released on the GameCube. Sammy Studios was the initial US publisher for the game, under the title of Drift Racer: Kaido Battle and slated for a February 2004 release, before it was moved to Crave Entertainment.

== Reception ==
Reception

Aggregate scores
Aggregator	Score
GameRankings	62%
Metacritic	59/100

Review scores
Publication	Score
Game Informer	6/10
GamePro	3/5
GameSpot	5.8/10
IGN	4.5/10
Official U.S. PlayStation Magazine	3/5
PlayStation: The Official Magazine	7/10
X-Play	2/5

The game was met with mixed reception upon release. Its GameRankings score was 62%, while its Metacritic score is 59 out of 100.
