= Powerslave (disambiguation) =

Powerslave may refer to:

- Powerslave, a 1984 album by Iron Maiden
  - "Powerslave" (song), the title track from that album
- PowerSlave, a first-person shooter video game (also known as Exhumed in European territories and A.D. 1999: Pharaoh's Revival in Japan)
