= Crayola =

American manufacturing and retail company

Crayola LLC
- Formerly: Binney & Smith Company (1885–2007)
- Type: Subsidiary
- Traded as: NYSE: BYS
- Industry: Art materials
- Founded: June 25, 1885; 141 years ago
- Founders: Edwin Binney; C. Harold Smith
- Headquarters: Forks Township, Pennsylvania, U.S.
- Number of locations: 11
- Area served: Worldwide
- Key people: Peter Ruggiero (president and CEO); Steve Hoff (EVP & COO); Leena Vadaketh (EVP, Operations)
- Products: Crayons; chalks; acrylics; watercolor; brushes; colored pencils; markers; modelling clay
- Brands: Crayola; Silly Putty; Portfolio Series; Crayola Studios
- Number of employees: 2,000 (2018)
- Parent: Hallmark Cards (1984–present)
- Website: crayola.com

Crayola LLC, formerly the Binney & Smith Company, is an American manufacturing and retail company specializing in art supplies. It is best known for its Crayola brand of crayons. The company is headquartered in Forks Township, Pennsylvania, in the Lehigh Valley region of the state. Since 1984, Crayola has been a wholly owned subsidiary of Hallmark Cards.

Originally an industrial pigment supply company, Crayola soon shifted its focus to art products for home and school use, beginning with chalk, then crayons, followed later by colored pencils, markers, paints, modeling clay, and other related goods. All Crayola-branded products are marketed as nontoxic and safe for use by children. Most Crayola crayons are manufactured in the United States.

Crayola also produces Silly Putty and a line of professional art products under the Portfolio Series brand, including acrylics, watercolor, tempera, and brushes.

Crayola claims the Crayola brand has 99% name recognition in U.S. consumer households and says its products are marketed and sold in over 80 countries.

== History ==
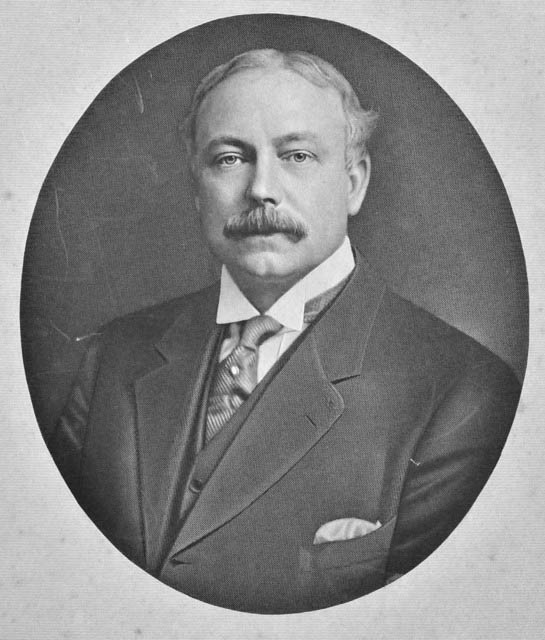
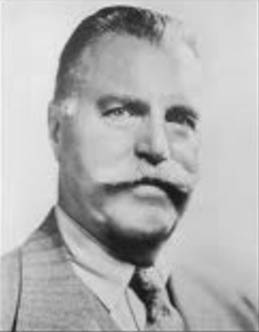
Crayola's founders Edwin Binney (left) and Harold Smith (right), c. 1900

The company was founded by Edwin Binney and Harold Smith, who met during their shared time as U.S Marines. Their first products were colorants for industrial use, including red iron oxide pigments used in barn paint and carbon black chemicals used for making tires black and extending their useful lifespan. Their new process of creating inexpensive black colorants was entered into the chemistry industries competition at the 1900 Paris Exposition under the title "carbon gas blacks, lamp or oil blacks, 'Peerless' black" and earned the company a gold medal award in chemical and pharmaceutical arts. Also in 1900, the company added production of slate school pencils. Binney's experimentation with industrial materials, including slate waste, cement, and talc, led to the invention of the first dustless white chalk, for which the company won a gold medal at the 1904 St. Louis World's Fair.

Initially formed as a partnership, Binney & Smith incorporated in 1902, and in that year Binney & Smith developed and introduced the Staonal marking crayon. Then Edwin Binney, working with his wife, Alice Stead Binney, developed his own famous product line of wax crayons beginning on June 10, 1903, which it sold under the brand name Crayola. The Crayola name was coined by Alice Binney who was a former schoolteacher. It comes from craie (French for "chalk") and ola for "oleaginous" or "oily." The suffix "-ola" was also popular in commercial use at the time, lending itself to products such as granola (1886), pianola (1901), Victrola (1905), Shinola (1907), and Mazola (1911). Crayola introduced its crayons not with one box, but with a full product line. By 1905, the line had expanded to offering 18 different-sized crayon boxes with five different-sized crayons, only two of which survive—the "standard size" (a standard sized Crayola crayon is 3 5/8 in × 5/16 in (92.1 mm × 7.9 mm)) and the "large size" (large sized Crayola crayons are 4 in × 7/16 in (102 mm × 11 mm)). The product line offered crayon boxes containing 6, 7, 8, 12, 14, 16, 18, 24, 28, or 30 different color crayons. Some of these boxes were targeted for artists and contained crayons with no wrappers, while others had a color number printed on the wrapper that corresponded to a number on a list of color names printed inside the box lid, but some boxes contained crayons with their color names printed on their wrappers.

The Rubens Crayola line, started in 1903, was directly targeted at artists and designed to compete with the Raphael brand of crayons from Europe. The crayon boxes sold from five cents for a No.6 Rubens box containing six different-colored crayons to $1.50 for the No. 500 Rubens Special Artists and Designers Crayon box containing 24 different-colored, larger (4 1/4 in × 1/2 in (108 mm × 13 mm)) crayons.

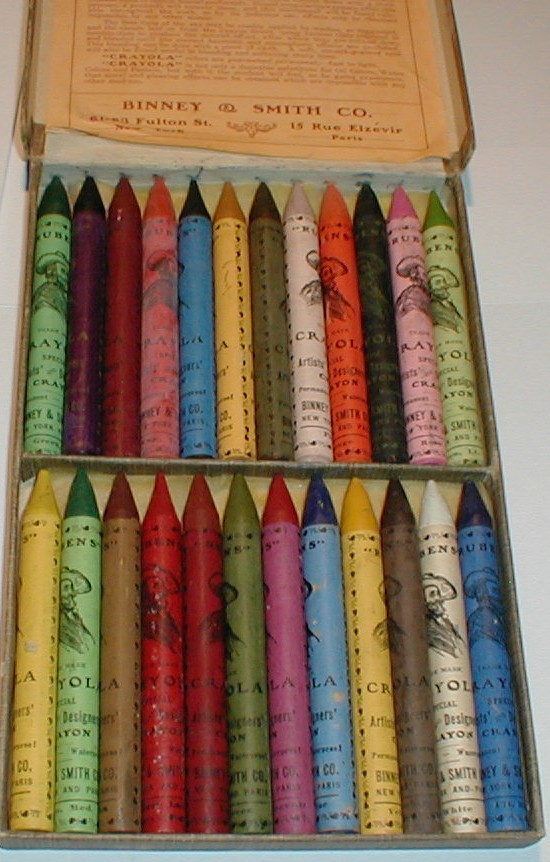
Rubens No. 500 box, c. 1904–12

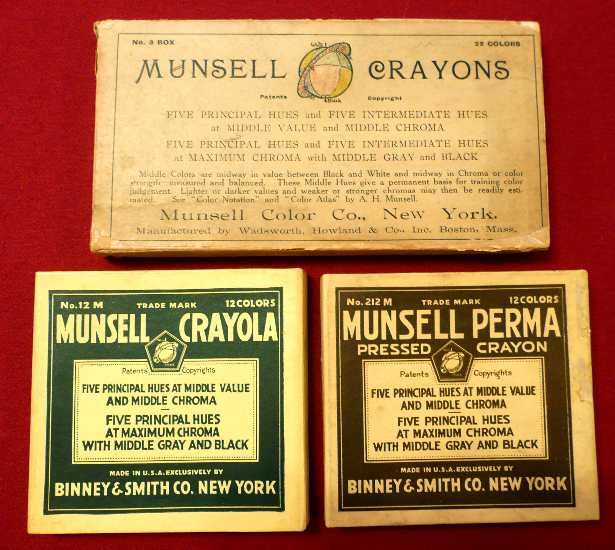
Original Munsell crayons box

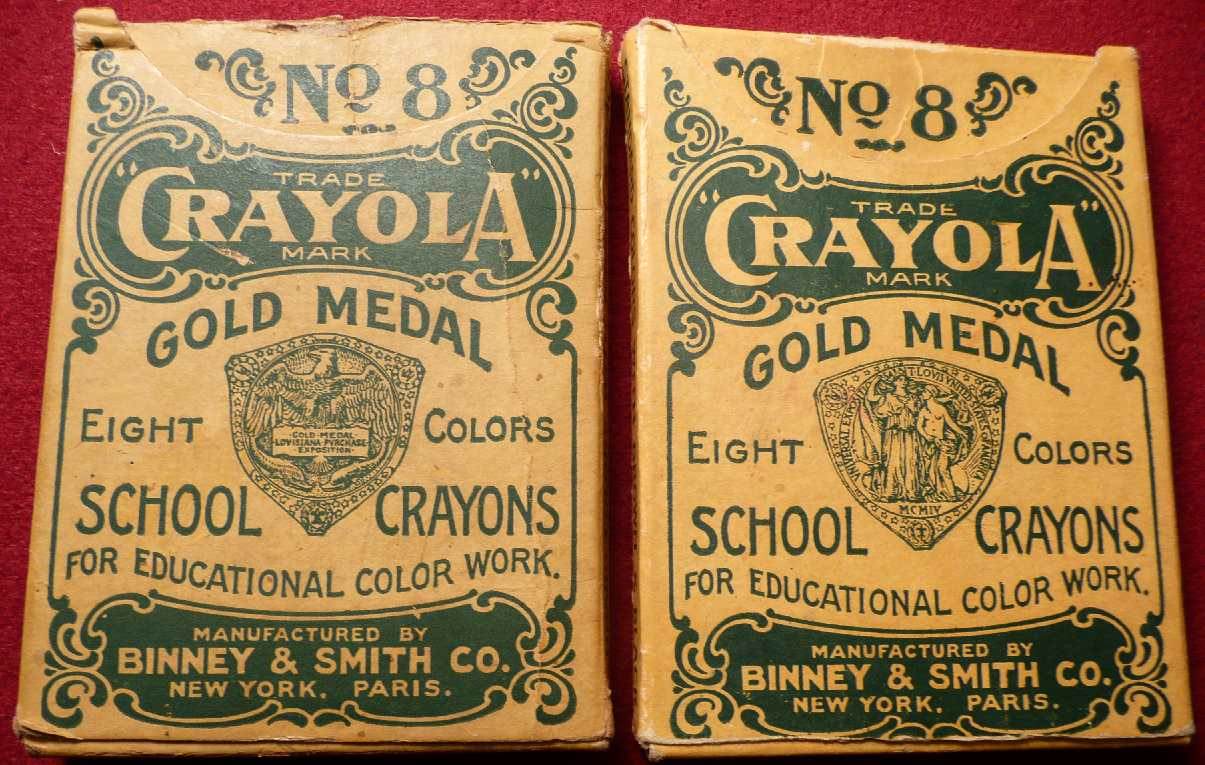
The first two Gold Medal line 8-count boxes

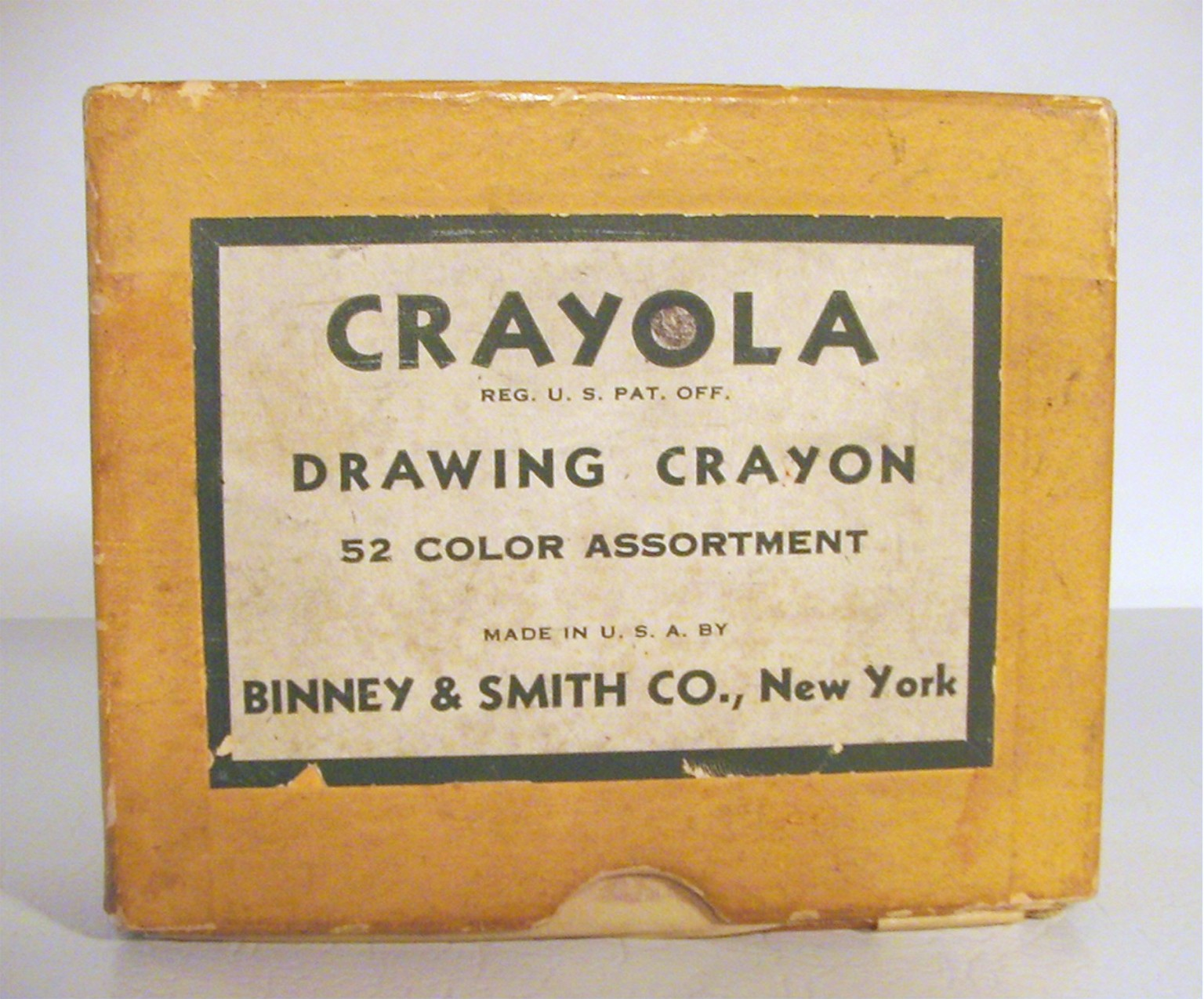
No. 52 box, c. 1939–44

In April 1904 at the St. Louis World's Fair, Binney & Smith won the Golden Medal for their An-Du-Septic dustless chalk. Subsequently, Crayola used the opportunity to develop a new packaging strategy by emphasizing their gold medal on the front of many of their products and crayon boxes. This strategy turned out to be so successful and recognizable to their brand that they phased out nearly all of their other Crayola line box designs to adapt to the gold medal format, which appeared on their packaging for the next 50-plus years.

In 1905, the prototype offering of their new No. 8 crayon box (with eight crayons) featured a copy from the side of the medal with an eagle on it. This was changed to the other side of the medal with the 1904 date on it in Roman numerals.

Binney & Smith purchased the Munsell Color Company crayon product line in 1926, and inherited 22 new colors, 11 in the maximum and 11 in the middle hue ranges. They retained the Munsell name on products such as "Munsell-Crayola" and "Munsell-Perma" until 1934, and then incorporated their colors into their own Crayola Gold Medal line of boxes.

In 1939, Crayola, by combining its existing crayon colors with the Munsell colors, introduced its largest color assortment product to date; a "No. 52 Drawing Crayon 52 Color Assortment", which was retired by the 1944 price list.

In 1949, Crayola introduced the "Crayola No. 48" containing 48 color crayons in a non-hangable floor box.

Further expansion took place in 1957 with the introduction of the 64-color pack that included the company's first crayon sharpener built into the box. The 64-color box was called "a watershed" moment in the history of the Crayola crayon by Smithsonian National Museum of American History curator David Shayt.

The corporation became a publicly traded company under the symbol BYS on the American Stock Exchange in 1963, and later moved to the New York Stock Exchange under the same symbol in 1978.

In 1977, Binney & Smith acquired the rights to Silly Putty, a stretchy, bouncy silicon rubber compound. Crayola markers were introduced in 1978 to coincide with the 75th anniversary of Crayola crayons. In 1984, the company was acquired by Hallmark Cards, a privately held corporation. Colored pencils and a line of washable markers were added in 1987.

In August 1997, Crayola collaborated with Alliance Atlantis and the entertainment arm of Hallmark Cards to release three direct-to-video adaptations of famous children's novels under the name Crayola Kids Adventures.

Crayola Crayons were inducted into the National Toy Hall of Fame at The Strong in Rochester, New York, in 1998. On January 1, 2007, Binney & Smith reorganized as Crayola LLC, to reflect the company's number one brand.

In 2011, My First Crayola was launched. Products include triangular crayons and flat-tipped markers.

In 2015, Crayola announced "Color Escapes" for adults to help them relieve stress. The kit includes four collections, such as geometric, garden, natural, and kaleidoscope.

== Crayons ==
Crayola

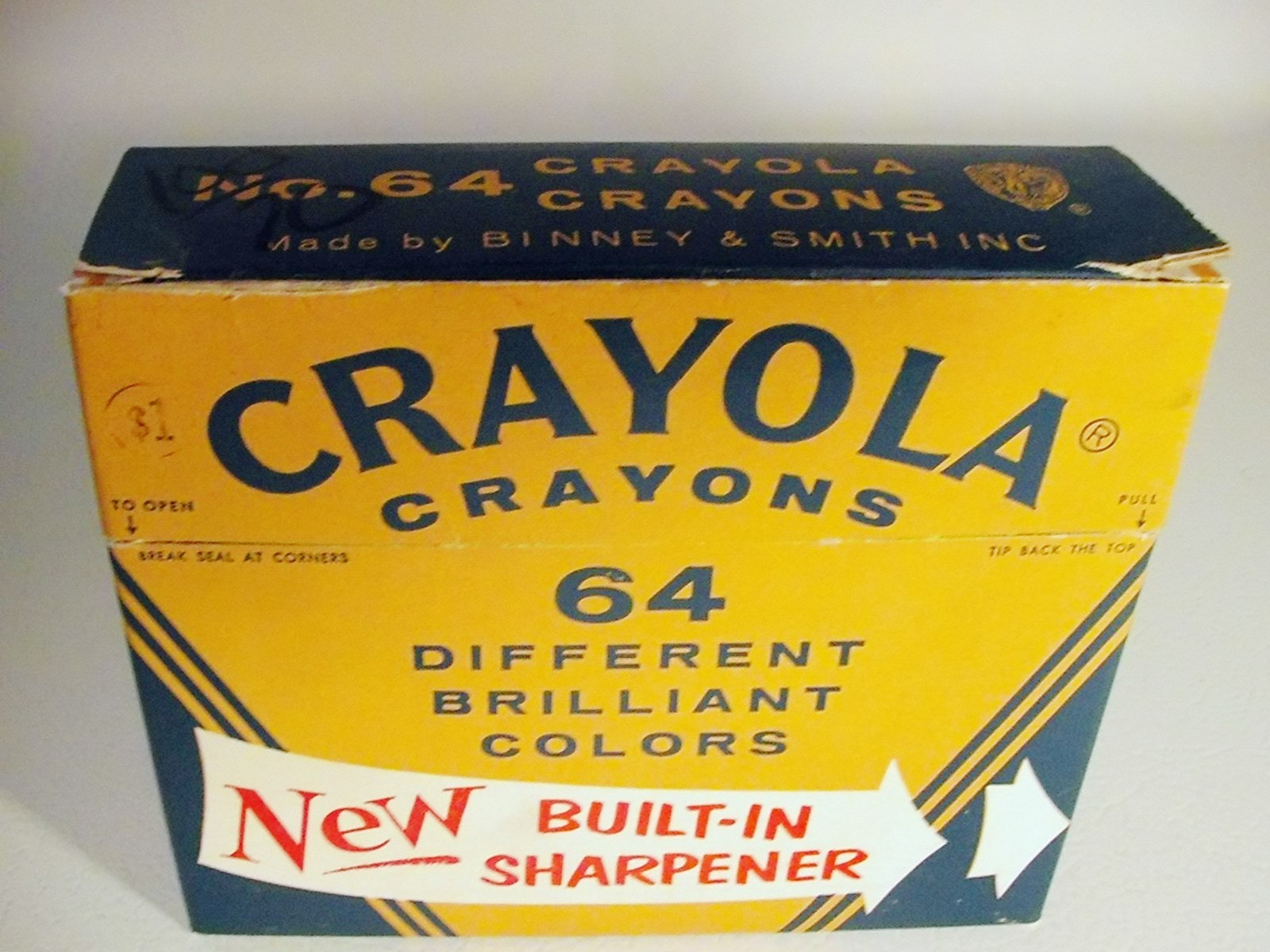
First version of the Crayola No. 64 box

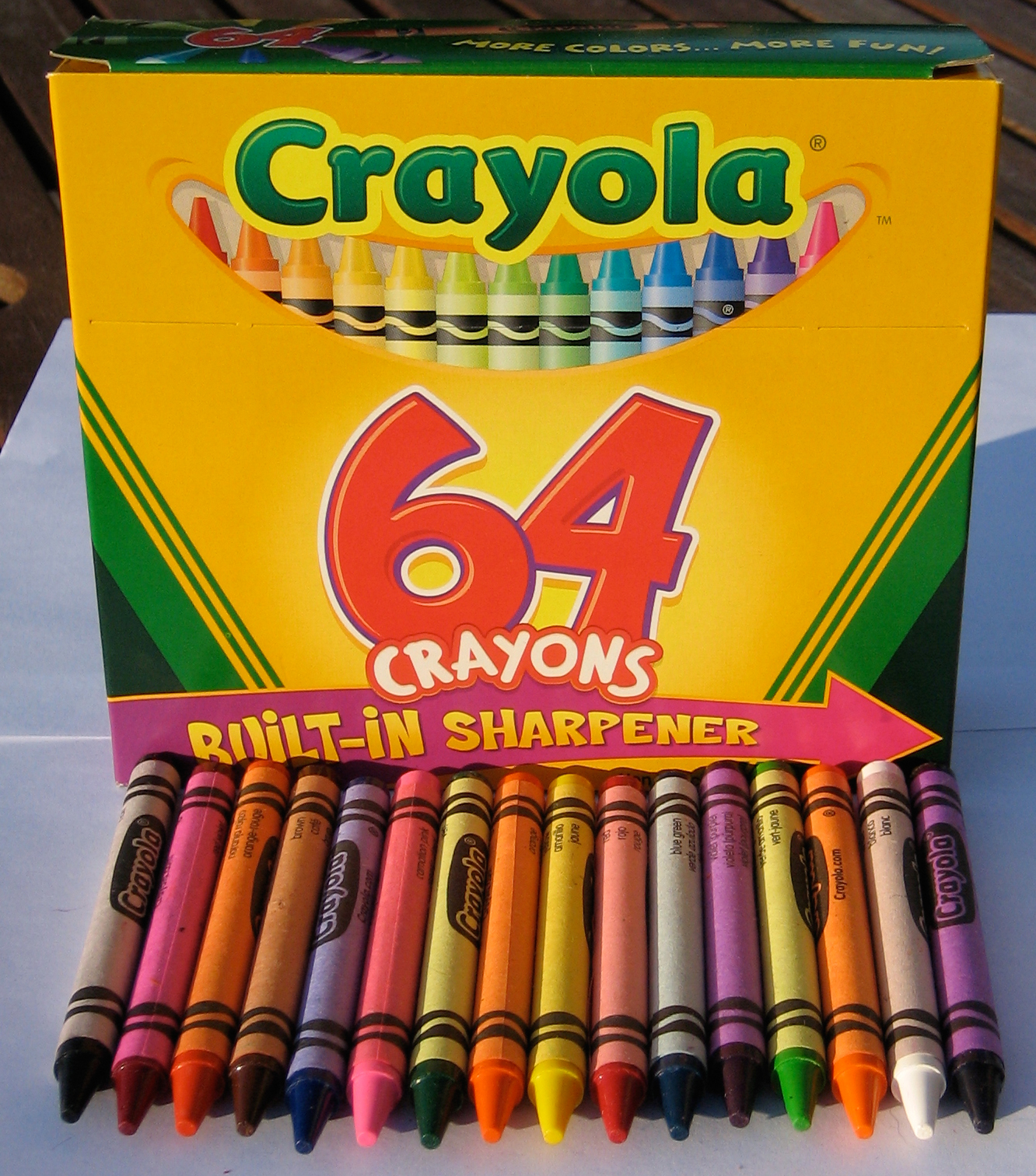
64-crayon pack sporting built-in sharpener

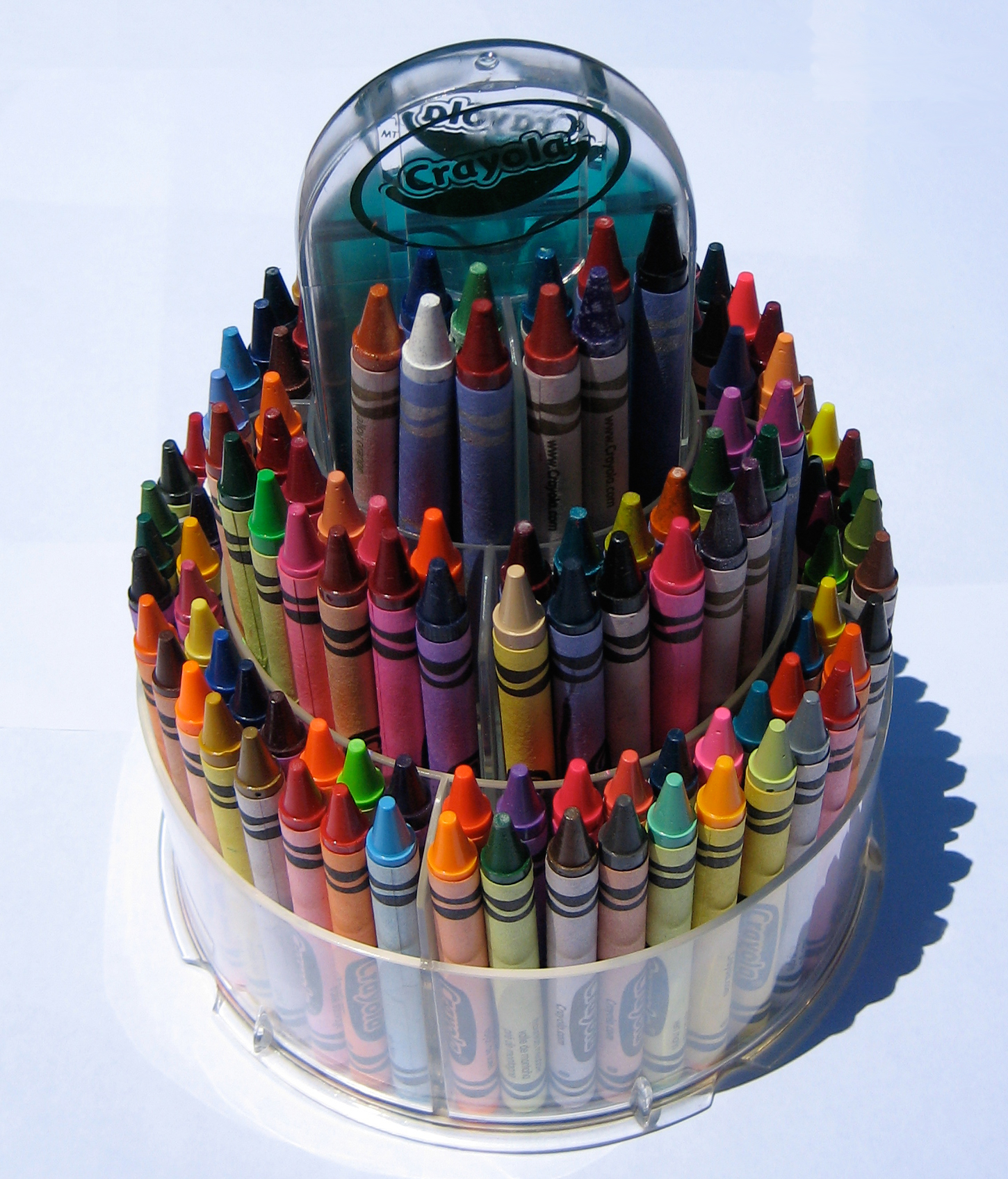
Crayola telescoping 150 crayon tower

Crayola crayon packs vary in package counts of just a few crayons sold to establishments such as hotels and restaurants, to hand out to their young guests, to 832-crayon "Classpack" bulk boxes marketed to schools. The colors contained in a package have ranged from two to 200 (although a 200-color package includes "special effect" crayons such as glitters, neons, etc).

The most common retail packages are multiples of eight, with 8, 16, 24, 32, 48, 64, 96 and 120 packs being marketed today. A 150-crayon pack featuring a plastic telescope-like case was introduced in 2006, and includes 118 regular color crayons, 16 glitter crayons, and 16 "Metallic FX" crayons, as well as a built-in sharpener at the apex of the tower. This was succeeded by a 152-crayon set in a plastic yellow carrying case in 2013, with all the colors from the 150-crayon set plus the standard colors Piggy Pink and Blue Bell.

=== Colors ===
As the size of Crayola crayon packs increased from the original 1903 packs, the number of available colors also increased—reaching 120 colors by 1998. Since 1998, new colors have been added but have always replaced existing colors. On March 31, 2017, Crayola announced that Dandelion would be retired. On September 14, 2017, the replacement color "Bluetiful" was announced. The color is reportedly a new hue realized after experiments done at Oregon State University. It was discovered while scientists were experimenting with electronics. In 2021, with the introduction of the Colors of Kindness pack, 4 new colors were introduced. To date, 13 colors have been retired, bringing the total number of regular colors produced to 139. According to Crayola, they currently manufacture 149 standard crayon colors, and their largest box has 120 crayons. This does not include specialty crayons like the Metallic FX, Gel FX and the glitter crayons, but does include fluorescent crayons. In 2026, Crayola brought Dandelion back.

==== Colors chart ====
The colors in the box below come in the packs of 8, 16, and 24:

8 pack (as of 1903)		+8 = 16 pack (as of 1930)		+8 = 24 pack (as of 1999-2017, 2026)	
Red	Orange	Carnation Pink	Red Orange	Violet Red	Scarlet
Yellow	Green	Yellow Orange	Yellow Green	Green Yellow	Cerulean
Blue	Violet (Purple)	Blue Green	Blue Violet	Dandelion	Indigo
Brown	Black	Red Violet	White	Apricot	Gray

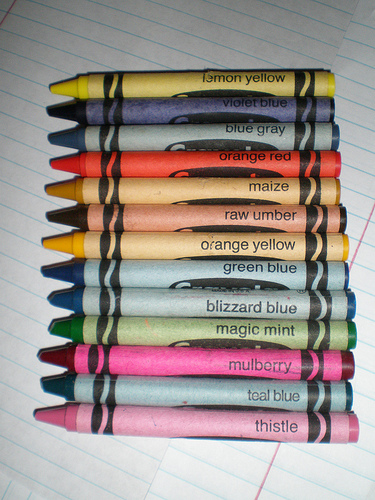
The 13 officially retired Crayola crayon colors (excluding Dandelion, which is no longer retired since 2026)

In 2020, Crayola introduced a new line of 24 colors named "Colors of the World" to reflect nearly 40 skin tones of people around the world. The box of these crayons included a gradient skin tone label.

== Cultural impact ==
The Smithsonian National Museum of American History maintains a collection of Crayola crayons founded by an original 64-color box donated by Binney & Smith in 1998. The collection now includes more than 300 boxes of crayons.

The Crayola crayon was inducted into the National Toy Hall of Fame as a founding member at its inception.

Crayola has been featured in segments from the popular children's shows Sesame Street and Mister Rogers' Neighborhood, with the official 100 billionth crayon molded by Fred Rogers himself in February 1996 at the plant in Easton.

=== Commemorative postage stamp ===
In 1998, the United States Postal Service issued a 32-cent postage stamp to commemorate the cultural impact the product has had on almost all Americans.

The stamp is part of the 1900s decade sheet of the Celebrate the Century souvenir sheet series, and was designed by Carl Herrman, illustrated by Richard Waldrep and printed by Ashton-Potter USA using the offset/intaglio process.

=== Crayola color census 2000 ===
In 2000, Crayola held the "Crayola Color Census 2000" promotion in which Americans were asked to vote for their favorite Crayola crayon color. Celebrity entrants George W. Bush chose "Blue Bell", Tiger Woods chose "Wild Strawberry", and Courteney Cox chose "Red". Overall, "Blue" came in first, with "Cerulean" second, and "Purple Heart" third.

=== Crayola Experience ===
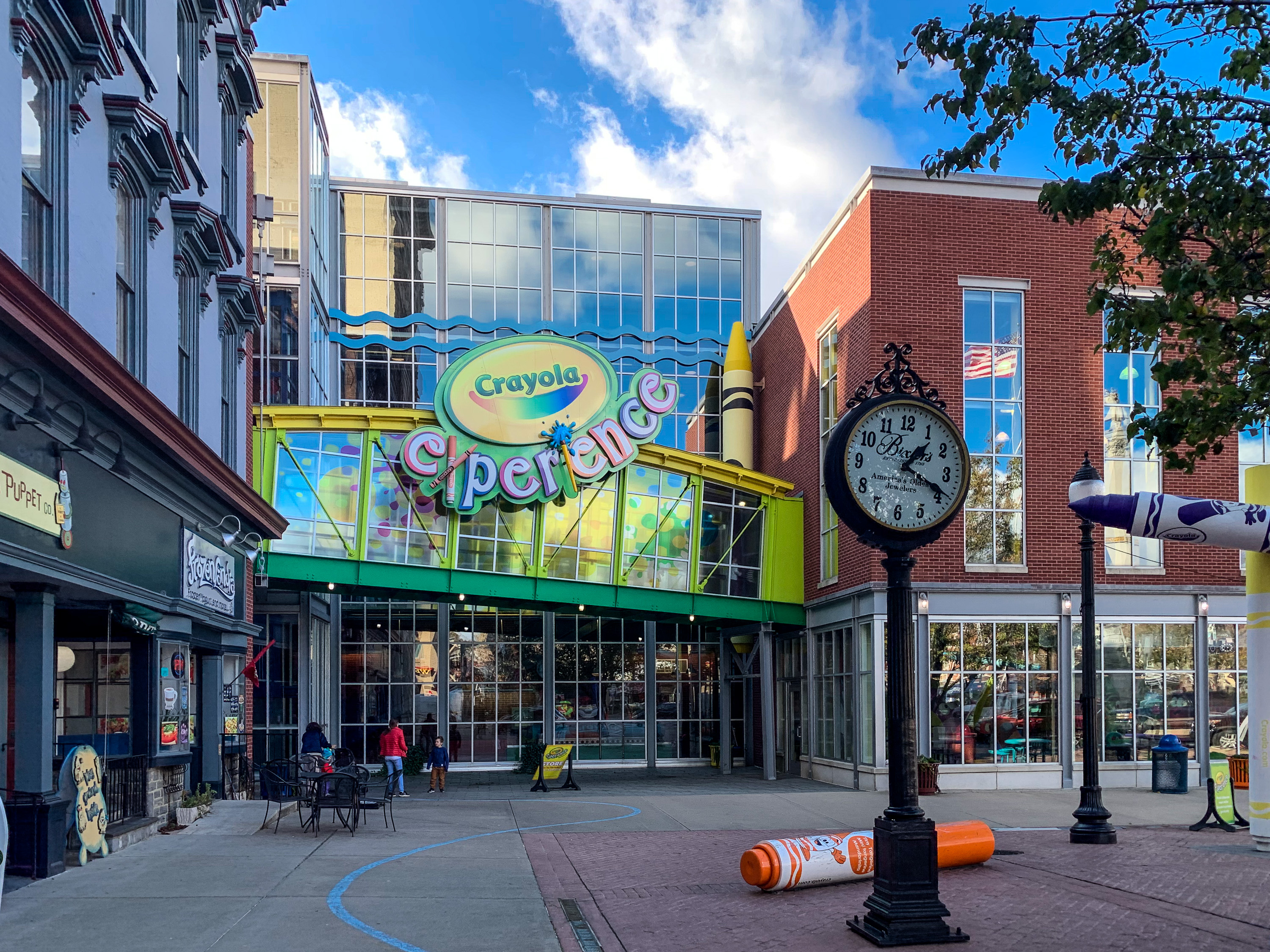
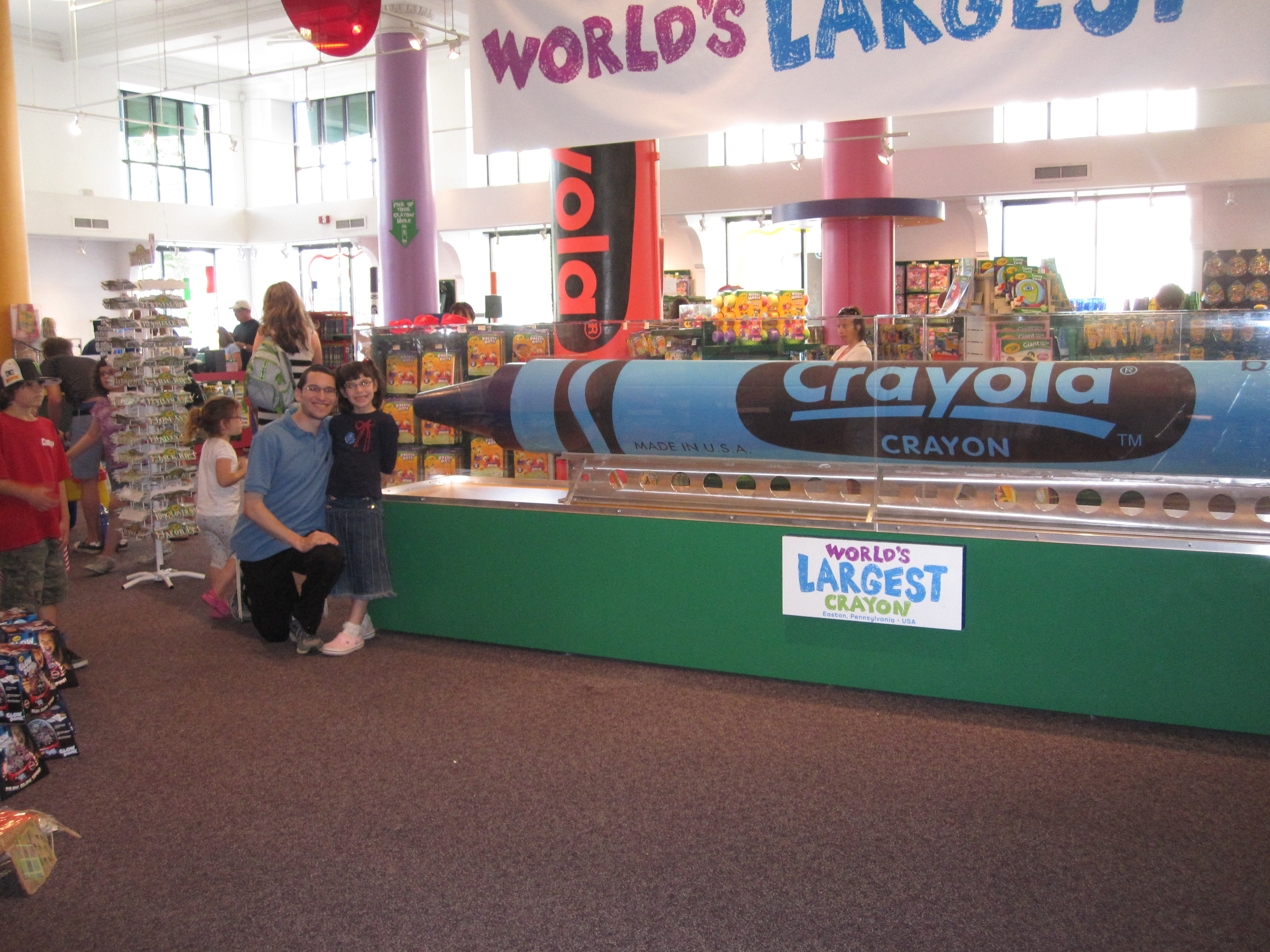
Left: Crayola Experience in downtown Easton, Pennsylvania. Right: The "World's Largest Crayon" was made in 2003 from 123,000 used or broken blue crayons donated by people from across the USA. This was a world record until 2017 when Crayola made a larger crayon using the new color, bluetiful.

Originally opening as the Crayola Factory, the Crayola Experience is located at 30 Centre Square, Easton, Pennsylvania, at Two Rivers Landing. Open to the public, the Crayola Experience is a roomy, crayon-centric warehouse including events, a café, a store, attractions, some familiarizing guests, and Crayola's history with products.

A "discovery center" was built that showcases the manufacturing process of crayons. There is also a "Crayola Hall of Fame" in which the retired crayon colors are displayed.

The Crayola Experience was featured in a Food Network episode of Dinner: Impossible. A dinner was held for 150 employees of the Crayola Experience to celebrate the 50th anniversary of the 64-box of crayons. Chef Michael Symon's mission was to create an eight-course tasting menu for this event, where all eight items of the menu had to match eight randomly chosen Crayola crayon colors.

On October 11, 2003, the Experience unveiled "The World's Largest Crayon", a 15-foot-long (4.6 m) crayon weighing 1,500 pounds (680 kg), as part of its celebration of 100 years of Crayola crayons. The giant crayon, 16 inches (410 mm) in diameter, is blue, and was made of leftover crayon bits ("leftolas") sent in by children across the United States.

It opened its first location in Two Rivers Landing, in Easton, Pennsylvania, in May 2013, its second location in The Florida Mall, Orlando, Florida, in June 2015, its third location in Mall of America, Bloomington, Minnesota, in February 2016, its fourth location in The Shops at Willow Bend, Plano, Texas, in March 2018, and its fifth location in Chandler Fashion Center, Chandler, Arizona, in May 2019. Plans were announced in 2023 for a sixth location in Pigeon Forge, Tennessee, at the former Smoky Mountain Opry Theater, but were cancelled when the building was sold to a new developer.

The Chandler, Arizona location closed permanently in 2025, followed by the Plano, Texas location in March 2026, leaving only the Pennsylvania, Minnesota, and Florida locations in operation as of July 2026.

=== Fine art ===
Although marketed to children and amateur artists, several professional artists have specialized in using Crayola crayons as their primary medium. Don Marco, who works with Crayola crayons and construction paper, is one of the better known crayon artists, having sold over one million prints of his original artworks.

== Other products ==
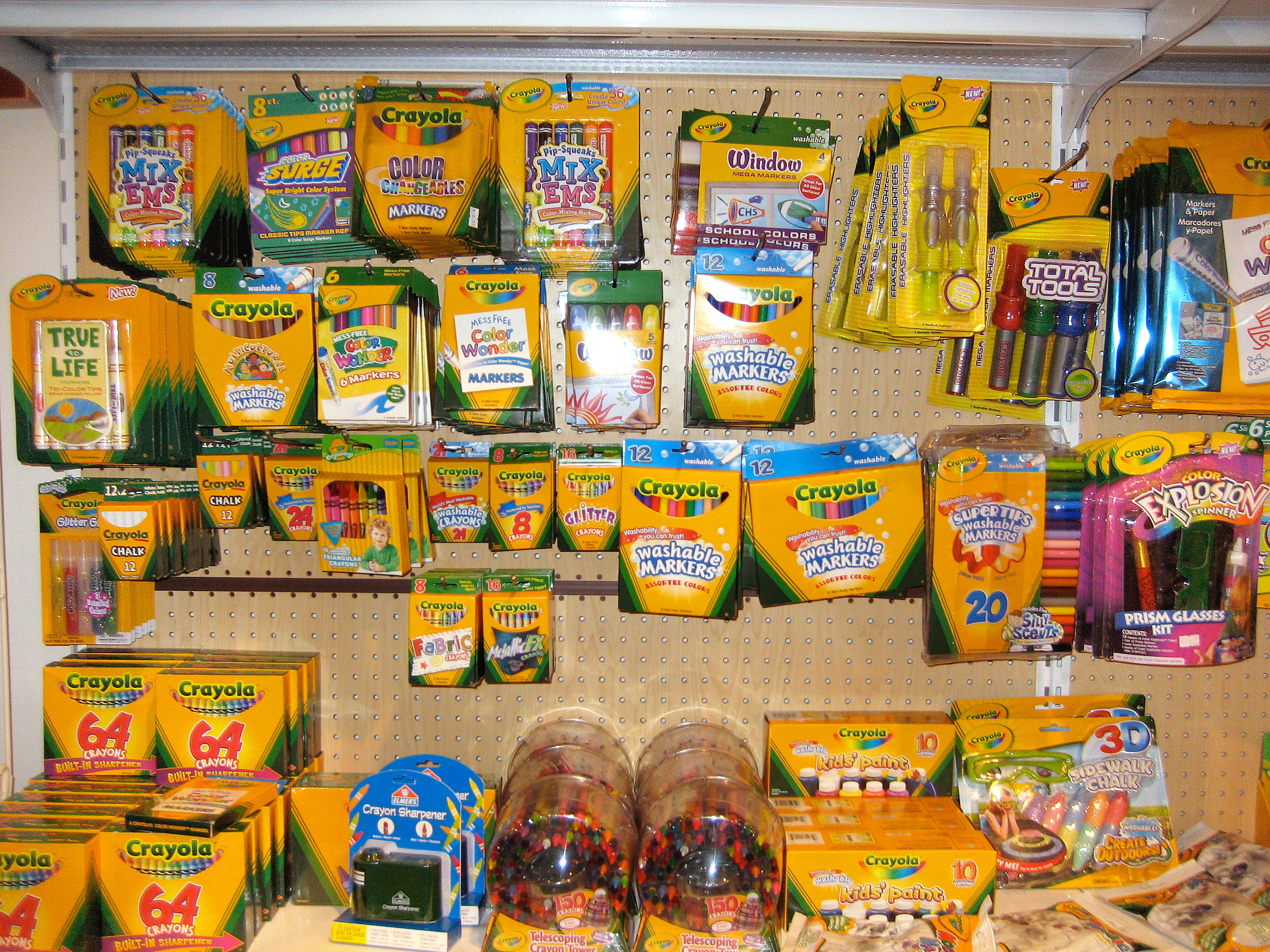
A selection of Crayola products for sale at a New York City art supply store, July 2009

Crayola LLC produces a broad range of products other than their famous crayons under the Crayola brand name. These include colored pencils, markers, inks and paints, modeling clays, coloring books, and artists' tools. As with all Crayola products, these are all marketed as non-toxic and safe for use by children.

=== Other brands ===
==== Silly Putty ====
Silly Putty is a silicone polymer children's toy used for various purposes. Silly Putty was inducted into the National Toy Hall of Fame in 2001.

==== Portfolio Series ====
The Portfolio Series is a line of water-soluble oil pastels, watercolors, drawing pencils, colored pencils, and acrylic paints marketed to artists and educators.

==== Liquitex ====
Binney & Smith acquired the Liquitex corporation, a producer of fine art supply products, in 1964, but sold it to the Colart company in 2000.

==== Silly Scents ====
Silly Scents is a line of scented crayons, markers, colored pencils, clay and paint.

==== Staonal ====
Marketed as a general (non-coloring)-use crayon for industrial purposes, Staonal was developed in 1902 and still continues as of 2018.

==== Scribble Scrubbie Pets ====
Scribble Scrubbie Pets are animal figurines that can be written on with washable markers. Various 'digital pets' are available using the Scribble Scrubbie Pets App.

==== Crayola Studios ====
On August 3, 2023, Crayola launched a studio division that would produce content for kids and families. Victoria Lozano, Crayola's executive VP marketing, will oversee the division.

=== Licensing ===
Numerous products, ranging from bath and personal care items to bedding and electronics, are produced by other companies using the Crayola brand name under license. Firebrand Games developed a Crayola-themed video game, titled Crayola Treasure Adventures, which was published by Crave Entertainment for Nintendo DS in 2007. Climax Studios developed another Crayola-themed video game, titled Crayola Scoot, which was published by Outright Games for Microsoft Windows, Nintendo Switch, PlayStation 4, and Xbox One in 2018.

In 2021, Kellogg's and Crayola teamed up to create a fruit-flavored cereal with a coloring book on the box. Kellogg's Crayola Jazzberry Cereal are rainbow-colored corn puffs, and the package included access to a digital pet in the Scribble Scrubbie Pets App.

=== Christmas lights ===
In the 1996–1997 season, Crayola produced Christmas lights using its name with colors such as pink, orange, blue, gold, green, red, and more.

=== Manufacturing ===
Crayola has manufacturing plants in Forks Township, Pennsylvania; Bethlehem, Pennsylvania; and Mexico City. The colored pencils are made by Faber-Castell in Brazilian plants.
