= Crave Entertainment =

Defunct American video game publisher

- Final logo from 2011 to 2012
- Type: Subsidiary
- Industry: Video games
- Founded: 1997; 29 years ago
- Founder: Nima Taghavi
- Defunct: 2012; 14 years ago
- Fate: Dissolved
- Headquarters: Newport Beach, California, United States
- Key people: Nima Taghavi (CEO); Vincent Bitetti (President)
- Subsidiaries: Lobotomy Software; Big Rain; Craveyard Studios; Red Wagon Games
- Website: CraveGames.com

Crave's old logo 2004–2011

Crave Entertainment (aka Crave Games) was an American video game publisher founded in 1997 by Nima Taghavi. Its headquarters was in Newport Beach, California. It was acquired by Handleman Company in 2005 in a deal valued up to $95 million but was then sold to Fillpoint LLC in early 2009 for only $8.1 million due to Handleman's bankruptcy and pending liquidation. During its lifetime it published games for Dreamcast, Wii, Nintendo DS, Game Boy Advance, Nintendo 64, GameCube, PlayStation, PlayStation 2, PlayStation 3, PSP, Xbox, and Xbox 360. Crave mainly focused on budget titles, and imported games such as Tokyo Xtreme Racer series.

== History ==
Crave Entertainment was founded in 1997 by Nima Taghavi as a subsidiary of distributor, SVG Distributions. The company was headquartered in Los Angeles, with offices in San Francisco, Tokyo, Paris, and Hamburg. In 1998 the company acquired Lobotomy Software, the creators of Death Tank and PowerSlave. That same year, the company also acquired Big Rain, a studio formed by former Squaresoft veterans, and founded its first internal studio, Craveyard Studios. In 1999 Crave signed an exclusive five year licensing deal for the video game rights to Ultimate Fighting Championship.

The company briefly held a European distribution deal with Square Europe in 2000. In November 2000, Crave announced that it would sign a European co-publishing and distribution deal with Ubi Soft.

In 2005 the company and its parent company were acquired by Handleman who would later sell the publisher to Fillpoint in 2009. In 2006, it formed a partnership with Oxygen Interactive via Liquid Games, whereas Liquid Games would market its titles by Crave Entertainment for the European market.

During Fillpoint ownership, the company launched its own label for its family friendly gaming, Red Wagon Games.

On August 15, 2012, Fillpoint LLC filed for Chapter 11 Bankruptcy, with Crave ceasing operations. In 2023, the website was revived with a Coming Soon page by Fillpoint and Throwback Entertainment.

== List of video games published by Crave Entertainment ==
- AeroWings
- AeroWings 2: Airstrike
- America's Next Top Model
- An American Tail: Fievel's Gold Rush
- Armored Core 2 (PAL regions only)
- Arthur McLean's 3D Pool
- Art of Fighting Anthology (PAL regions only)
- Asteroids Hyper 64
- Babe and Friends
- Baby Pals
- Bad Boys: Miami Takedown
- Battle Realms
- Battle Realms: Winter of the Wolf
- Battlezone: Rise of the Black Dogs
- Beyblade: Let it Rip!
- The Bible Game
- Blaster Master: Blasting Again
- Broken Sword II: The Smoking Mirror
- Brunswick Pro Bowling
- Butt-Ugly Martians: Zoom or Doom
- Camp Lazlo: Leaky Lake Games
- Cartoon Network: Punch Time Explosion
- Cartoon Network: Punch Time Explosion XL
- Casper's Scare School: Classroom Capers
- Casper's Scare School: Spooky Sports Day
- Cosmos Chaos
- Crayola: Colorful Journey
- Crayola Treasure Adventures
- Dave Mirra BMX Challenge
- Deadliest Catch: Sea of Chaos
- Defendin' de Penguin
- Draconus: Cult of the Wyrm
- Dragon Dance
- Elf
- eJay Clubworld
- Eternal Eyes
- Eternal Ring
- Evergrace
- Earthworm Jim: Menace 2 the Galaxy
- Fighting Force
- The Flintstones: Big Trouble in Bedrock
- Foster's Home for Imaginary Friends
- Future Tactics: The Uprising
- Freedom Force
- Gem Smashers
- George of the Jungle and the Search for the Secret
- Get Up and Dance
- Gex: Enter the Gecko (GBC version only)
- Gex 3: Deep Cover Gecko
- Galerians
- Global Operations
- Godzilla: The Series
- Godzilla: The Series - Monster Wars
- Hard Rock Casino
- The Holy Bible (PAL regions only)
- Intellivision Lives!
- Jade Cocoon: Story of the Tamamayu
- Kabuki Warriors
- Kengo: Master of Bushido
- Killer Loop
- King of Clubs
- Legend of the River King 2
- Looney Tunes: Bang and Vroom!
- MagForce Racing
- Man vs. Wild
- Mechanic Master 2
- Men in Black: The Series
- Men in Black 2: The Series
- Milo's Astro Lanes
- Mojo!
- Monster Mayhem: Build and Battle
- Mort the Chicken
- Mr. Bean's Wacky World of Wii
- MX World Tour Featuring Jamie Little
- Napoleon Dynamite: The Game
- The Next Tetris: On-line Edition
- NRA Gun Club
- Oregon Trail
- Penny Racers
- Pinball Hall of Fame: The Gottlieb Collection (2004)
- Pinball Hall of Fame: The Williams Collection (2007)
- Pitfall: Beyond the Jungle
- TH3 Plan
- Pro Bull Riders: Out of the Chute
- Puzzle Challenge: Crosswords and More
- Purr Pals (NA versions only)
- Razor Freestyle Scooter
- Razor Racing
- Record of Lodoss War (NA Dreamcast version - 2001)
- Red Dog: Superior Firepower
- Robotron 64
- Rudolph the Red-Nosed Reindeer
- Santa Claus is Comin' to Town
- Sing 4: The Hits Edition
- Ski and Shoot
- Sky Dancers
- Shadow Madness
- Sno-Cross Championship Racing
- Sno-Cross 2 Featuring Blair Morgan
- Soldier of Fortune
- Solitaire & Mahjong
- Spelling Challenges and More!
- Stadium Games
- Starlancer
- Strike Force Bowling
- Sudokuro
- Superbike World Championship
- Super Magnetic Neo
- Summer Athletes: The Ultimate Challenge
- Surf Rocket Racers
- thinkSMART
- Tony Hawk's Pro Skater (Dreamcast version only)
- Tokyo Xtreme Racer
- Tokyo Xtreme Racer 2
- Tokyo Xtreme Racer 3
- Tokyo Xtreme Racer Advance
- Tokyo Xtreme Racer Drift
- Tokyo Xtreme Racer Drift 2
- Tokyo Xtreme Racer: Zero
- Trigger Man
- Tringo
- Ultimate Fighting Championship
- UFC: Tapout
- UFC: Throwdown
- Vagrant Story (PAL regions only)
- VeggieTales: LarryBoy and the Bad Apple
- Virtual Pool 64
- Whirl Tour
- Winter Sports 2: The Next Challenge
- Winter's Tail
- Witches & Vampires: The Secret of Ashburry
- World Championship Cards
- World Championship Poker Deluxe Series
- World Championship Poker: Featuring Howard Lederer ALL-IN
- World Championship Poker 2: Featuring Howard Lederer
- X-Blades: Inline Skater

== Cancelled games ==
- H20verdrive
- Jeanette Lee's Virtual Pool
- Man vs. Wild (DS and PSP versions)
- Pilot Academy
- Powershot Pinball
- PowerSlave 2
- Pro Bull Riders: Out of the Chute (Xbox 360 version)
- Project Cairo (Nintendo 64 DD, developed by Craveyard)
- Savage Safari Hunt
- SnoCross 2 Featuring Blair Morgan (Xbox version)
- Supershot Golf Robot
- Jet Ion GP (released in Europe in 2002, the U.S. release was cancelled)
- The Lost (PAL regions only)
- UFC: Tapout (Dreamcast version)
- World Championship Poker All In
- Wave Runner (Dreamcast version)
