= AeroWings 2: Airstrike =

2000 video game

- North American Dreamcast cover art
- Developer: CRI
- Publishers: JP: CRI Middleware; WW: Crave Entertainment
- Platforms: Dreamcast, Microsoft Windows
- Release: Dreamcast: JP: February 24, 2000; NA: August 8, 2000; EU: December 8, 2000; Todoroki Tsubasa no Hatsu Hikō: JP: November 16, 2000
- Genre: Air combat simulation
- Modes: Single-player, multiplayer

AeroWings 2: Airstrike, known in Japan as Aero Dancing F (エアロダンシング F, Earo Danshingu F), is a combat flight simulator developed and published by CRI, and Crave Entertainment for the Dreamcast and Microsoft Windows. It is the sequel to AeroWings. An updated version of the game, called Aero Dancing F: Todoroki Tsubasa no Hatsu Hikō (エアロダンシングF 轟つばさの初飛行, Earo Danshingu F Todoroki Tsubasa no Hatsu Hikō; lit. "Thunder Tsubasa's First Flight"), was released exclusively for Dreamcast in Japan on November 16, 2000.

== Gameplay ==
Unlike its predecessor, AeroWings 2 deals with air combat training (being, in that sense, a simulation of a simulation), rather than aerial stunts.

== Reception ==
Reception

Aggregate score
Aggregator	Score
Metacritic	74/100

Review scores
Publication	Score
CNET Gamecenter	8/10
Computer and Video Games	6/10
Eurogamer	8/10
Famitsu	32/40 (S.E.) 30/40
Game Informer	7.5/10
GameSpot	8.3/10
GameSpy	6/10
IGN	(US) 8/10 (JP) 7.2/10
Next Generation	3/5
Maxim	3/5

The game received "average" reviews according to the review aggregation website Metacritic. Jeff Lundrigan of NextGen gave the game generally positive review. In Japan, Famitsu gave it a score of 32 out of 40 for the original game, and 30 out of 40 for the updated Dreamcast version.
