= Trigger Man (video game) =

2004 video game

- GameCube cover art
- Developer: WNT Games
- Publishers: NA: Crave Entertainment; EU: Play-It
- Designers: Kraig Horigan; Brian McInerny
- Platforms: PlayStation 2, GameCube, Xbox
- Release: NA: September 28, 2004; PAL: August 12, 2005 (PS2)
- Genre: Third-person shooter
- Mode: Single-player

Trigger Man is a 2004 third-person shooter video game developed by WNT Games and published by Crave Entertainment for GameCube, PlayStation 2, and Xbox.

== Summary ==
The main character of the story, who seems to have no actual name, is Don Coladangelo's personal "clean-up guy". He has no remorse for cold-blooded murder as long as it serves his boss' desires. His reasons for blindly serving the Don are never revealed, only that he has "some ties" to the mob boss. He is only called "The Trigger Man". The game opens with Don Coladangelo holding a meeting between him, his capo Ralph Borrello, and the game's protagonist, The Trigger Man. He relays the information that the Montagano family is moving against the Coladangelos due to the murder of Tony Montagano, Don Montagano's only son and successor to the Montagano Family.

The Trigger Man proclaims his readiness to "deal with" the Montagano's any way the Don sees fit. Don Coladangelo then asks his favorite assassin to convince the Montagano's of their innocence in Tony's murder, and to persuade them to call off the vendetta with an apology.

Ralph Borrello then informs Trigger Man of a diamond smuggling operation being used to finance the Montagano's new casino, and that the diamonds are more than likely being moved fast, as their funds have been drastically depleted, and proclaiming war amongst mob families is anything but cheap. The Don seems certain they're keeping the diamonds in a high-tech vault inside the casino, and hires you to steal them, in order to cut out the Montagano's income, and possibly ending the war before it starts.

== Reception ==
Reception

Aggregate score
Aggregator	Score		
Aggregator	GameCube	PS2	Xbox
Metacritic	35/100	32/100	31/100

Review scores
Publication	Score		
Publication	GameCube	PS2	Xbox
GameSpot	N/A	4.2/10	4.2/10
IGN	2/10	2/10	2/10
Nintendo Power	1.3/5	N/A	N/A
TeamXbox	N/A	N/A	2.4/10

The game received "unfavorable" reviews on all platforms according to the review aggregation website Metacritic.
