= Eternal Eyes =

1999 video game

- Developer: TamTam
- Publishers: WW: Sunsoft; NA: Crave Entertainment
- Platform: PlayStation
- Release: JP: December 2, 1999; UK: September 21, 2000; NA: November 17, 2000
- Genre: Tactical role-playing game
- Mode: Single-player

Eternal Eyes, known in Japan as Koukroseatro: Yūkyū no Hitomi (ククロセアトロ 〜悠久の瞳〜, Kukuroseatoro 〜Yūkyū no Hitomi〜; lit. "Koukroseatro: Eternal Eyes"), is a tactical role-playing game developed by TamTam and published by Sunsoft and Crave Entertainment in 1999.

== Reception ==
Reception

Aggregate score
Aggregator	Score
GameRankings	46%

Review scores
Publication	Score
Consoles +	80%
Electronic Gaming Monthly	6.5/10
Famitsu	24/40
Game Informer	7.75/10
Jeuxvideo.com	10/20
Official U.S. PlayStation Magazine	1.5/5
RPGamer	1/5
RPGFan	70%

The game received unfavorable reviews according to the review aggregation website GameRankings. In Japan, Famitsu gave it a score of 24 out of 40.
