= Butt-Ugly Martians: Zoom or Doom =

2002 video game

Butt Ugly Martians: Zoom or Doom
- North American PlayStation 2 box art
- Developer: Runecraft
- Publishers: EU: Vivendi Universal Games; NA: Crave Entertainment
- Composers: Michael Tavera, Jorge Bender
- Platforms: GameCube, PlayStation 2
- Release: PlayStation 2: PAL: December 6, 2002; NA: July 31, 2003; GameCube: PAL: May 10, 2003
- Genre: Racing
- Modes: Single-player, multiplayer

Butt-Ugly Martians: Zoom or Doom is a 2002 racing video game released by Runecraft. The game is based on the animated television series Butt-Ugly Martians.

== Gameplay ==
The gameplay of Zoom or Doom focuses mainly on competitive racing, there are seven different racers of which two have to be unlocked by the player by racing as certain characters and winning the cup, each with different vehicle statistics such as handling, acceleration, and maximum speed. There is also a time attack mode; a practice mode; a mode where a player races on their own without CPU racers and a multiplayer mode, which allows the player to race with another person. An autosave feature is not present, meaning the player has to manually save the game or else all progress will be lost.
