= Butt-Ugly Martians =

English-language animated television series

- Genre: Comedy; Science fiction Action; Adventure
- Created by: Michael Train
- Developed by: Mike Young; Bill Schultz; Pamela Hickey; Dennys McCoy
- Voices of: Charlie Schlatter; Rob Paulsen; Jess Harnell; Kath Soucie; Ogie Banks; Robert Stack; S. Scott Bullock
- Composer: Mike Tavera
- Countries of origin: United States; Hong Kong; United Kingdom
- Original language: English
- No. of seasons: 1
- No. of episodes: 26

Production
- Executive producers: Mike Young; Wendy Choi
- Producer: David Garber
- Running time: 22–23 minutes
- Production companies: Mike Young Productions; DCDC Limited; Just Entertainment

Original release
- Network: CITV (United Kingdom); Nickelodeon (United States)
- Release: February 19, 2001 – February 21, 2003

Butt-Ugly Martians is an animated television series co-produced by Mike Young Productions, Digital Content Development Corporation Limited and Just Entertainment. It was sold to ITV on October 2, 2000, for the original television pilot and premiered on CITV in the UK on February 19, 2001. It also premiered on Nickelodeon in the United States on November 9, 2001, and aired on Nicktoons until 2003.

The series was produced using Alias Wavefront Maya 3D software.

== Premise ==
The plot of the series begins when the Butt-Ugly Martians (B.U.M.) are forced to invade planets for the evil Emperor Bog. When they are sent to Earth, they become addicted to American culture. Deciding not to hurt Earth, they simply pretend to be occupying the planet for Bog. They are shown around by their Earthling friends: Mike, Cedric, and Angela. The Butt-Ugly Martians continue to hang out on Earth as long as Emperor Bog never finds out.

== Characters ==
=== Main ===
- B-Bop A-Luna (voiced by Charlie Schlatter) – The diplomat and leader of the Butt-Ugly Martians. Brave, comedic, showy, and a little big headed, B-Bop can always be trusted to think up a good cover story and look convincing doing it. He wears a yellow uniform and a Yellow BKM suit.
- 2T Fru-T (voiced by Rob Paulsen) – The mechanic and comic relief of the Butt-Uglies and inventor of BKM. A mechanical prodigy, 2T is able to construct anything from invisibility rays to the BKM (Butt Kicking Mode) suits using parts that are immediately available. He wears a blue uniform and a Blue BKM suit.
- Do-Wah Diddy (voiced by Jess Harnell) – The fun-loving Martian of the trio, who has a huge appetite and loves to eat junk food. He wears a red uniform and a Red BKM suit.
- Shaboom Shaboom (voiced by Kath Soucie) – A female Martian secret agent. She is aware of the trio's defection, but keeps it a secret, and it is often implied that the Butt-Uglies have crushes on her.
- Michael "Mike" Ellis (voiced by Rob Paulsen) – A redheaded, green-eyed 13-year-old boy, Mike is the unofficial and sometimes debatable leader of the human friends of the Martians. A typical teenager, Mike enjoys watching TV, eating junk food, hoverboarding, and listening to the newest music.
- Angela Young (voiced by Kath Soucie) – Angela is level-headed and smart, often the voice of reason to the more reckless male characters in the series. Much to Mike's dismay, she is also very good at playing video games and once saved the world with her skills with a joystick. Angela acknowledges that Do-Wah has a crush on her; whether she likes him back romantically is debatable.
- Cedric Cyles (voiced by Ogie Banks) – A 12-year-old bespectacled African-American boy, Cedric hangs out with Mike and Angela. Cedric is a technical wizard akin to 2T, although he is more of a computer hacker than a mechanic.
- Stoat Muldoon (voiced by Robert Stack) – A well-meaning but overly zealous alien hunter who discovers the Martians on Earth several times throughout the series, but every time he does, the Martians outwit him and erase his memory.
- Dog – Their robot pet dog that can fly and seems to always find a way to get the Martians out of trouble.

=== Enemies ===
- Emperor Bog (voiced by S. Scott Bullock) – The evil but foolish ruler of the Martian populace, Bog is often fooled by the Butt-Ugly Martians' fake progress reports. He has little tolerance for imperfection; his idea of perfection being everything going according to what he wants.
- Dr. Damage (voiced by S. Scott Bullock) – Bog's more intelligent right-hand-man, Damage constantly suspects that the Butt-Uglies are up to something. He is usually right, but rarely noticed. Damage develops many instruments, machines and mutant creatures to conquer Earth, but these are usually destroyed by the Butt-Uglies.
- Jax – A warlord who despises Martians. After being defeated and imprisoned by B-Bop and the others, pretends to be willing to help them invade Earth to get a chance for revenge. He pilots a ship called the Doom Jax, which is impervious to Martian weaponry.
- Humanga – A giant alien villain who is the only player of an alien game called Toget.
- Infi-Knight – A four-armed robotic warrior created by Damage to speed the Earth invasion along.
- Koo Foo – The last surviving member of an alien race that attempted to conquer the universe 2,000 years prior before mysteriously vanishing. His crashed ship was submerged in the desert and believed to be a pyramid due to its shape. After Koo Foo is freed by Muldoon, it is revealed that he is not evil like the rest of his kind and had left the swarm of ships before crashing on Earth.
- Gorgon – A fire-breathing lizard-like alien with shapeshifting abilities.
- Klaktor – A Reconabot (portmanteau for "reconnaissance robot") that the Butt-Uglies defeated in the first episode. He can fall apart and reassemble himself at will.

== Episodes ==
No.	Title	Written by	Storyboarded by	Original release date
1	"Playback/Payback"	Pamela Hickey & Dennys McCoy	Ken Laramay, Tomas Sisneros & Rick Hoberg	February 19, 2001 (UK); January 9, 2002 (US)
2	"Jax the Conqueror"	Pamela Hickey & Dennys McCoy	Dave Edwards, Dan Fausett & Clint Taylor	February 20, 2001 (UK); January 11, 2002 (US)
3	"Meet Gorgon"	Bill Braunstein	Rich Childlaw, Keith Tucker & James Yang	February 21, 2001 (UK); February 10, 2002 (US)
4	"You Bet Your Planet"	Pamela Hickey & Dennys McCoy	Rick Hoberg, Elaine Hultgren & Kuni Tomita	February 22, 2001 (UK); February 17, 2002 (US)
5	"Mike in Space"	Pamela Hickey & Dennys McCoy	Dan Fausett, Romeo Francisco & Clint Taylor	February 23, 2001 (UK); March 3, 2002 (US)
6	"Meet Koo Foo"	Pamela Hickey & Dennys McCoy	Rich Childlaw, Keith Tucker & James Yang	February 27, 2001 (UK); March 7, 2002 (US)
7	"The Big Bang Theory on Mars"	Scott Guy	Rick Hoberg, Elaine Hultgren & Ken Laramay	March 6, 2001 (UK); March 10, 2002 (US)
8	"Damage's Little Girl"	Kelly Ward	Dave Edwards, Romeo Francisco & Clint Taylor	March 13, 2001 (UK); March 17, 2002 (US)
9	"Introducing... the Ultimate Infi-Knight"	Bill Matheny	Bob Foster, Keith Tucker & James Yang	March 20, 2001 (UK); March 24, 2002 (US)
10	"Brothers from Another Planet"	Richard Albrecht & Casey Keller	Romeo Francisco, Greg Garcia & Dan Kubat	March 27, 2001 (UK); March 31, 2002 (US)
11	"That's No Puddle, That's Angela"	Bill Braunstein	Dave Edwards, Keith Tucker & James Yang	April 3, 2001 (UK); April 2, 2002 (US)
12	"Out of Sync"	Pamela Hickey & Dennys McCoy	Rick Hoberg, Rhoy Shishido & Dave Simons	April 10, 2001 (UK); May 9, 2002 (US)
13	"Bog's Not So Dumb After All"	Richard Albrecht & Casey Keller	Romeo Francisco, Greg Garcia & Dan Kubat	April 17, 2001 (UK); November 10, 2002 (US)
14	"Bog in Charge"	Pamela Hickey & Dennys McCoy	Dave Edwards, Keith Tucker & James Yang	December 11, 2002
15	"Muldoon's Big Catch"	Richard Albrecht & Casey Keller	Rick Hoberg, Dave Simons & Scott Woods	December 17, 2002
16	"Emperor Damage"	Richard Mueller	Romeo Francisco, Mike Hedrick & Dan Kubat	January 23, 2003
17	"Bog's Missing Trophy"	Noah Taft	Romeo Francisco, Rick Hoberg & Dave Simons	February 2, 2003
18	"Better Off Without Us"	David Garber, Pamela Hickey, & Dennys McCoy	Mike Hedrick, Scott Jorgensen & Dan Kubat	February 4, 2003
19	"Everybody Loves Angie"	Richard Albrecht & Casey Keller	Barrington Bunce, Enrique May & Keith Tucker	February 8, 2003
20	"Unbrainwashing Muldoon"	Michael J. Prescott	Romeo Francisco, Scott Jorgensen & James Yang	February 9, 2003
21	"Bye Bye B-Bop"	Larry Levy	Rick Hoberg, Dan Kubat & Dave Simons	February 10, 2003
22	"Big Bash in Britain"	Pamela Hickey & Dennys McCoy	Barrington Bunce, Scott Jorgensen & Rich Childlaw	February 14, 2003
23	"Alien Games"	David Garber	Rick Hoberg, Keith Tucker & James Yang	February 15, 2003
24	"If the Suit Fits"	Pamela Hickey & Dennys McCoy	Barrington Bunce, Keith Tucker & James Yang	February 19, 2003
25	"Let's Make a Deal"	Scott Gordon	Greg Garcia, Mike Hedrick & Keith Tucker	February 20, 2003
26	"This Is... the Butt-Uglies"	Richard Albrecht & Casey Keller	Barrington Bunce, Scott Jorgensen & Dave Simons	February 21, 2003

== Merchandise ==
There were Scholastic chapter books, a Hasbro toy line and 3 videogames based on the series named Butt Ugly Martians: Zoom or Doom for PlayStation 2 and GameCube, Butt-Ugly Martians: B.K.M. Battles for Game Boy Advance, and Butt-Ugly Martians: Martian Boot Camp for PC.

== Broadcast and home media ==
Butt-Ugly Martians was sold to ITV on October 2, 2000, for the original television pilot and premiered on CITV on February 19, 2001.

Butt-Ugly Martians also premiered on both Nickelodeon and Nicktoons (until 2003) in the United States. It continued to air in reruns until June 30, 2005.

In Canada, the series also aired on Teletoon beginning September 4, 2001 until 2003.

=== VHS and DVD ===
As part of Universal's broad arrangement for the franchise, Universal Pictures Video obtained worldwide home video rights to the series in October 2001, with the exclusion of two European countries: the UK and Germany, where Just Entertainment (Abbey Home Media post-2002, following Just's bankruptcy) and BMG each held the rights.

==== UK ====
Name	Format	Episodes	Release Date	Distributor	Additional Information
Volume Zero	VHS	Promotional Video about the series	Early-2001	Just Entertainment	Promotional Release
Playback/Payback	VHS	"Playback/Payback" "Jax the Conqueror"	March 5, 2001	Just Entertainment	
Meet Gorgon	VHS	"Meet Gorgon" "You Bet Your Planet"	March 5, 2001	Just Entertainment	
The Martians Have Landed!	DVD	"Playback/Payback" "Jax the Conqueror" "Meet Gorgon" "You Bet Your Planet"	March 12, 2001	Just Entertainment	DVD version of the above VHS releases. Also includes several Special Features: Interactive Games; Photo Gallery; Comic Strip; Behind-the-scenes Interviews; Promo Trailers
Special Edition	VHS	Behind-the-Scenes Featurette	Spring 2001	Just Entertainment	Promotional release
Big Bang Theory	VHS	"Big Bang Theory" "Introducing... the Ultimate Infi-Knight"	May 28, 2001	Just Entertainment	
Mike in Space	VHS	"Mike in Space"	Summer 2001	Just Entertainment	Promotional release that was included with a Figure Set
KooFoo	VHS	"KooFoo "Mike in Space"	September 17, 2001	Just Entertainment	
Brothers From Another Planet	VHS	"Brothers From Another Planet" "That's No Puddle, That's Angela"	October 22, 2001	Just Entertainment	
Out of Sync	VHS	"Out of Sync" "If the Suit Fits"	Unknown 2001	Just Entertainment	Marks & Spencer Exclusive release
Bog's Not So Dumb After All	VHS	Bog's Not So Dumb After All" "Bog in Charge"	April 29, 2002	Just Entertainment	
Emperor Damage	VHS	"Emperor Damage" "Bog's Missing Trophy"	May 27, 2002	Abbey Home Media	
Muldoon's Big Catch	VHS	"Muldoon's Big Catch" "Damage's Little Girl"	June 24, 2002	Abbey Home Media	
3 Episodes	DVD	"KooFoo" "Mike in Space" "Bog in Charge"	April 14, 2003	Prism Leisure	
The Martians Have Landed!	DVD	"Playback/Payback" "Meet Gorgon" "You Bet Your Planet"	2004	Abbey Home Media	Disc is labeled as "You Bet Your Planet". This reissue removes the second episode and the extra features. Same product number as the original release.
Triple Set	DVD	"Big Bang Theory" "Introducing... the Ultimate Infi-Knight" "Brothers From Another Planet" "That's No Puddle, That's Angela" "Emperor Damage" "Bog's Missing Trophy"	October 31, 2005	Abbey Home Media	Includes DVD versions of: "Big Bang Theory"; "Brothers From Another Planet"; "Emperor Damage"

==== United States ====
Name	Format	Episodes	Release Date	Additional Information
Best of the Bad Guys	VHS/DVD	"Bog's Not So Dumb After All" "Bog in Charge" "Jax the Conqueror" (Bonus Episode)	July 30, 2002	Martian Boot Camp PC Demo (DVD)
Hoverboard Heroes	VHS/DVD	"Damage's Little Girl" "Playback/Payback" "Everybody Loves Angie"	July 30, 2002	Martian Boot Camp PC Demo (DVD)
Boyz to Martians	VHS/DVD	"Alien Games" "Out Of Sync" "This Is... the Butt-Uglies"	July 30, 2002	Martian Boot Camp PC Demo (DVD)

==== Germany ====
Name	Format	Episodes	Release Date	Additional Information
Band 1	VHS	"Playback/Payback" "Jax the Conqueror"	August 1, 2002	
Band 2	VHS	"Meet Gorgon" "You Bet Your Planet"	August 1, 2002	
Band 3	VHS	"Mike in Space" "Meet Koo Foo"	August 1, 2002	
Band 4	VHS	"The Big Bang Theory on Mars" "Damage's Little Girl"	August 1, 2002	
