= Surf Rocket Racers =

2000 video game

- Developer: CRI Middleware
- Publishers: JP: CRI Middleware; NA: Crave Entertainment; EU: Crave/Ubi Soft
- Platform: Dreamcast
- Release: EU: 2000; NA: February 28, 2001; JP: March 22, 2001
- Genre: Racing video game
- Modes: Single-player, multiplayer

Surf Rocket Racers (working title: Surf Rocket Racer), known in Japan as Power Jet Racing 2001 (パワージェットレーシング2001, Pawā Jetto Rēshingu 2001), is a video game developed and published by CRI Middleware and Crave Entertainment for Dreamcast in 2000-2001.

== Reception ==
Reception

Aggregate score
Aggregator	Score
Metacritic	55/100

Review scores
Publication	Score
AllGame	2/5
Electronic Gaming Monthly	4/10 (Note: In Electronic Gaming Monthly's review of the game, one critic gave it a score of 3/10, and the rest gave it each a score of 4.5/10.)
Eurogamer	6/10
Famitsu	29/40
Game Informer	5.5/10
GameSpot	4/10
GameSpy	5.5/10
IGN	7.2/10
Jeuxvideo.com	12/20
Next Generation	2/5

The game received "mixed" reviews according to the review aggregation website Metacritic. Jim Preston of NextGen called it "a diet, caffeine-free, non-carbonated version of much more interesting games." In Japan, Famitsu gave it a score of 29 out of 40. Iron Thumbs of GamePro said in an early review, "If you're a water-racing fanatic and [you] want nothing more than to use your Dreamcast to race jet-skis, then look no further. If you're looking for a solid racing game, keep on lookin'." (Note: GamePro gave the game two 4/5 scores for graphics and sound, 4.5/5 for control, and 3.5/5 for fun factor.)
