= Purr Pals =

2007 video game

- Developer: Brain Toys
- Publishers: NA: Crave Entertainment; EU: THQ (DS); EU: Deep Silver (Wii); JP: Interchannel
- Platforms: Nintendo DS, Wii
- Release: DS: NA: March 27, 2007; EU: August 10, 2007; JP: August 30, 2007; Wii: NA: July 10, 2008; EU: July 17, 2009
- Genre: Simulation
- Modes: Single-player, multiplayer

Purr Pals, released in Japan as Love Cat Life (Note: Japanese: ラブキャットライフ, Hepburn: Rabukyattoraifu), is a pet simulation game by American studio Brain Toys in which the player takes care of a kitten. It was published by Crave Entertainment in 2007 and is sponsored by Purina.

There was also a sequel released on May 12, 2012 called Purr Pals: Purrfection.

== Gameplay ==
Purr Pals is presented as a pet simulator where the player adopts and raises a virtual kitten. From the start, players choose from forty different breeds and customize their cat with hundreds of facial and body variations. Once adopted, the kitten becomes the focus of daily care and play. Players feed, groom, and clean their pet, while also engaging it with toys like a laser pointer or fishing string. The game encourages interaction through mini-games—ping-pong, musical "meow-a-longs," and other playful diversions—that keep the cat entertained and build the bond between owner and pet. Customization extends beyond the kitten itself: players can design indoor and outdoor environments and accessorize their cats with fashionable items.

== Reception ==
Reception

Aggregate score
Aggregator	Score
Metacritic	67%

Review scores
Publication	Score
IGN	65%
The Star Press	2.5/5
Nintendo Gamer	77/100
PALGN	7/10

The game holds a 67 rating on review site Metacritic based on 4 reviews for the DS version.

IGN rated the game a 6.5 of 10 saying "There's one last reason the title can't score higher than it does, though, and it's not the too-frequent need to feed mentioned above – it's game-ending crashes". PALGN rated the game a 7 of 10 saying "Purr Pals is a great alternative to Nintendogs and is a game that is a lot of fun for kitten lovers".

Jinny Gudmundsen from The Star Press rated the game a 2.5 of 5 saying "Video game offers cute but flawed simulation for cat lovers".

The highest-rated review comes from Nintendo Gamer who rated the game a 77 of 100 saying "Not entirely convincing, and far less smooth than Nintendo's unnamed dog-related game. But it's well put-together feline fun with minigames".

== See also ==
- Baby Pals
- Catz DS
