= CRI Middleware =

Japanese software developer

CRI Middleware Co., Ltd.
- Native name: 株式会社CRIミドルウェア
- Romanized name: Kabushiki gaisha Kuri Midoruwea
- Formerly: CSK Research Institute Corporation
- Company type: Public
- Traded as: TYO: 3698
- ISIN: JP3346050002
- Industry: Video game
- Founded: October 1983; 42 years ago
- Headquarters: Shibuya, Tokyo
- Area served: Worldwide
- Key people: Masao Oshimi; (president); Masahiko Suzumi; (chairman)
- Products: Middleware
- Revenue: ¥767 million (2021)
- Number of employees: 187 (2021)
- Subsidiaries: CRI Middlware China; R-Force; Two-Five; Web Technology
- Website: criware.com/en

CRI Middleware Co., Ltd. (formerly CSK Research Institute Corp.) is a Japanese developer providing middleware for use in the video game industry. From the early nineties, CRI was a video game developer, but shifted focus in 2001.

== History ==
CRI started out as CSK Research Institute, subsidiary of CSK, producing video games for the Mega Drive/Genesis. Throughout the 1990s, CRI gradually transitioned its focus, evolving into a provider of audio middleware tools like ADX and Sofdec. It went on to develop games for the Sega Saturn and Dreamcast before it was incorporated as CRI Middleware in 2001. In 2006, CRI Middleware introduced the CRIWARE brand.

== Games ==
=== Developed ===
| Name | Platform(s) | Release date(s) |
|---|---|---|
| Galaxy Force II | Mega Drive/Genesis | 1991 |
| Dyna Brothers | Mega Drive/Genesis | 1992 |
| After Burner III | Mega CD/Sega CD | 1993 |
| Might and Magic III: Isles of Terra | Mega CD/Sega CD | 1993 |
| Dyna Brothers 2 | Mega Drive/Genesis | 1993 |
| Zaxxon's Motherbase 2000 | 32X | 1995 |
| Puzzle & Action: Treasure Hunt | Sega Saturn | 1996 |
| Virtual On: Cyber Troopers | Sega Saturn | 1996 |
| Kunoichi Torimonochou | Sega Saturn | 1998 |
| AeroWings | Dreamcast | 1999 |
| TNN Motorsports HardCore Heat | Dreamcast | 1999 |
| Aero Dancing: Torodoki Taichou no Himitsu Disc | Dreamcast | 2000 |
| AeroWings 2: Air Strike | Dreamcast | 2000 |
| Aero Dancing F: Todoroki Tsubasa no Hatsu Hikou | Dreamcast | 2000 |
| Aero Dancing i: Jikai Sakuma de Machite Mase | Dreamcast | 2001 |
| Power Jet Racing 2001 | Dreamcast | 2001 |

=== Published ===
| Name | Platform(s) | Release date(s) |
|---|---|---|
| Speedball 2 | Mega Drive/Genesis | 1992 |
| Mega-Lo-Mania | Mega Drive/Genesis | 1993 |

== CRIWARE ==

=== CRI ADX ===
ADX

CRI ADX is a streamed audio format which allows for multiple audio streams, seamless looping and continuous playback (allowing two or more files to be crossfaded or played in sequence) with low, predictable CPU usage. The format uses the ADPCM framework.

=== CRI Sofdec ===
Sofdec

CRI Sofdec is a streamed video format supporting up to 24bit color which includes multistreaming and seamless playback with a frame rate of up to 60 frames per second. It is essentially a repackaging of MPEG-1/MPEG-2 video with CRI's proprietary ADX codec for audio playback.

=== CRI Clipper ===
CRI Clipper is an automated lip-syncing program which analyzes waveforms and outputs an appropriate lip pattern into a text file, for later substitution into the facial animations of the (in-game) speaker.

=== CRI ROFS ===
CRI ROFS is a file management system for handling a virtual disc image, an extension of the CD-ROM standard. It has no limitations on file name format, or number of directories or files, and has been designed with compatibility with ADX and Sofdec in mind.

=== CRI Sound Factory ===
CRI Sound Factory is a GUI-based video game audio tool for effective sound design without input from programmers. It has support for the previewing and playback of generated audio.

=== CRI Movie Encode ===
CRI Movie Encode is a video encoding service by which CRI generates Sofdec or MPEG files from other media. For a fee (designated by the length of the file to be encoded), files are converted to the desired format with the quality specified by the client.

=== CRI Audio ===
The Precursor to Cri ADX2

=== CRI Movie 2 ===
CRI Movie with High Definition video support.

=== CRI FileMajik ===
CRI FileMajik - file system with features such as: asynchronous file requests, prioritized loads, zero-buffer decompression and UMD speed emulation for the PlayStation Portable.
