= Tringo =

- Developers: Kermitt Quick; Nathan Keir
- Publishers: Donnerwood Media; Crave Entertainment
- Platform: Game Boy Advance
- Release: April 11, 2006
- Genre: Puzzle video game

Tringo is a 2006 puzzle video game developed by Kermitt Quick and Nathan Keir. Tringo was originally written as a game event in Second Life, the 'virtual world' created by Linden Lab that allows users to creative extensive custom content which they continue to own the rights to. It was released on April 11, 2006.

== Gameplay ==
The gameplay involves fitting 35 segmented pieces onto a five-by-five grid over the course of a round consisting of 35 turns. The player strategically positions each available shape to create squares ranging from four to nine blocks in size, with each completed square disappearing from the grid and awarding a varying number of points. Pieces that cannot be placed due to space or time limitations result in a loss of points, and the player can choose from Classic, Infinite, and Time Trial modes.

== Development ==
Tringo was published by Donnerwood Media, a company based in San Francisco. In September 2005, Crave Entertainment signed the license to Tringo. Tringo was first released on the Game Boy Advance published by Crave Entertainment and developed by David A. Palmer Productions was released in late April, 2006, and there will be more platform releases in 2006.

== Reception ==
Reception

Review scores
Publication	Score
Daily Echo	3/5
Gamezebo	50%
Nintendo Gamer	52%
PopMatters	4/10

Daily Echo called Tringo a distant second to anything Tetris has to offer. PopMatters found Tringo to not offer puzzle solving and anticipation of other Tetris-esque titles.
