= Super Magnetic Neo =

2000 video game

- North American Dreamcast cover art
- Developer: Genki
- Publishers: JP: Genki; WW: Crave Entertainment
- Director: Manabu Tamura
- Platform: Dreamcast
- Release: JP: February 3, 2000; NA: June 15, 2000; EU: August 4, 2000
- Genres: Adventure, Platformer
- Mode: Single-player

Super Magnetic Neo (Note: Also known as Super Magnetic NiuNiu (スーパーマグネチックニュウニュウ, Sūpā Magunechikku NyūNyū) in Japan) is a 3D platform game developed by Genki and released exclusively for the Dreamcast console. The game was originally released in Japan on February 3, 2000. The North American version was published by Crave Entertainment and was released on June 15, 2000, followed by the European release on August 4, 2000.

The game is centered around the concept of magnetism. The protagonist Neo (NiuNiu in the original Japanese release) is a robot who has the ability to positively or negatively charge himself in order to repel or attract enemies, or to repel from or attract to platforms and other environmental objects.

== Gameplay ==
The game is a 3D platformer, with the usual jumps, platforms and enemies but features a novel game mechanic which centers around magnetism. Neo himself is able to become positively or negatively charged at the press of a button, which is represented on-screen as a blue or red magnetic field/pulse. The red and blue magnetic fields are mapped intuitively to the corresponding colored button on the Dreamcast controller. Neo's magnetic fields interact with platforms, contraptions and enemies.

If Neo emits a red magnetic field near a red enemy, it is propelled into the distance based on the repelling nature of similarly charged magnets. Emitting a red magnetic field near a blue enemy will attract them, again based on the properties of magnets. When attracted, enemies will also be compressed to form a small magnetically charged box. These concepts work in the same way when Neo emits a blue magnetic field. Once boxed up, enemies become projectiles that can be used to defeat other enemies or to destroy roadblocks such as walls.

Neo's magnetism can also be used to interact with platforms. For example, red platforms can used to perform super jumps when Neo emits a red magnetic field, effectively repelling him into the air, or alternatively he can "stick" to them by emitting a blue magnetic field. There are also zip lines that Neo can attach to by using the opposite colored magnetic field and levers that can be pushed by using the same colored magnetic field. These contraptions are strung together in series, requiring the player to constantly change the magnetic field to rapidly repel and attract their way through the level. The result is that the player can essentially "fly" through large sections without ever touching the ground.

Most of the game sees Neo travelling by foot with the usual running, jumping and pulling up on ledges. There are also levels featuring transport via a minecart, where similarly to Donkey Kong Country, the player travels on rails and cannot choose their direction, but can jump to avoid enemies and obstacles. There are also ride sections, where Neo sits atop a robotic camel or horse, both of which accelerate forwards, requiring the player to move left and right and jump to avoid enemies and obstacles, much like the polar bear and tiger ride sections seen in the Crash Bandicoot video game series.

The main game spans four worlds: Jungle World, Ancient World, Cowboy World, and Future World. Each world has four levels and a boss level, thus the game consists of 20 levels in total. The levels are joined by a hub world and upon returning there after completing a level, the player has the option to save their progress. There is also a challenge mode, featuring 20 puzzle levels, each with five difficulties, providing 100 levels to complete.

In addition to challenge mode, there is also replay value in the form of collectables, objectives and the associated rewards. Each non-boss level has eight "Pinki Coins" to collect, a hidden item and a time trial/time attack where the player must complete the level in under a certain amount of time. Once the player achieves these three objectives on a level, they are rewarded with a piece of furniture for Neo's home. There are 16 pieces of furniture to collect including a computer, a freezer and a famous art print.

In general, the gameplay and advancement is noted to be difficult and based on memorization of the location of enemies and contraptions, much like traditional platformers from previous generations.

== Plot ==
The Pinki gang, consisting of the leader Pinki and her two henchmen Yasu and Gasu, have taken over Pao Pao amusement park. Pinki, an evil toddler, and her gang have filled the park with monsters, robots, and various magnetic contraptions. The amusement park is the professor's favourite vacation destination, so he sends his magnetic robot Neo, who is an AI based on his own personality, to take back the park from the Pinki gang and restore it to its former glory.

Neo enters the park and utilises his powers of magnetism to traverse the various platforms, traps and contraptions and to defeat any enemies and bosses in his path. He fights through 4 differently themed areas of the amusement park after which he is able to track down and confront Pinki.

The final showdown with the Pinki gang sees Neo battle a giant mechanised ballerina robot. The Pinki gang are controlling the robot from the control centre in its head. When Neo defeats the ballerina, its body explodes and sends the head (still containing Pinki, Yasu and Gasu) flying into deep space.

== Development ==
Super Magnetic Neo was developed by Genki and was released for the Dreamcast on February 3, 2000. Once the direction of the game had been determined, it took 1 year to create with 18-20 staff members working on it. The magnetic mechanics of the game were pioneered primarily by Nobuyuki Nakano, who also designed the challenge and training modes.

The high difficulty of the game was an intentional decision by the team at Genki. They explained in an interview with Gamers' Republic magazine that "staff members spent long hours working on game balance". They also added that they had strong feelings around not adding in any notes or signs that told the player what to do. They then go on to explain that the "goal was to communicate, not through written words but through Neo's body movements. As the result, SMN became a very challenging game".

The character design of Neo (NiuNiu) involved all members of the production team including programmers, producers and animators in addition to the designers. The main idea was to create a character that would "physically embody magnetic characteristics". However, designer Shunsuke Kabasawa was responsible for Neo's overall design.

Maintaining 60fps was a high priority throughout the creation of the game and took considerable development time to ensure that there were little to no frame rate drops.

The North American localization was published by Crave Entertainment and was released on June 15, 2000 and the European release was on August 4, 2000. To try to lessen the frustration over the difficulty of the game for the Western audience, Crave implemented power-ups that enabled Neo to take multiple hits before dying.

== Reception ==
Reception

Aggregate score
Aggregator	Score
GameRankings	70%

Review scores
Publication	Score
CNET Gamecenter	7/10
Consoles +	89%
Electronic Gaming Monthly	5.17/10 (Note: Three critics of Electronic Gaming Monthly gave the game each a score of 6.5/10, 3/10, and 6/10.)
Famitsu	29/40
Game Informer	8.5/10
GameFan	(J.W.) 73% 64% (Note: Three critics of GameFan gave the Japanese import each a score of 65, 83, and 45.)
GamePro	3.5/5 (Note: GamePro gave the game two 4/5 scores for graphics and sound, and two 3.5/5 scores for control and overall fun factor.)
GameRevolution	B
GameSpot	6.4/10
GameSpy	6.5/10
IGN	6.9/10
Next Generation	3/5

The game received above-average reviews according to the review aggregation website GameRankings. In Japan, Famitsu gave it a score of 29 out of 40.

The recurring view in reviews was that the game's strengths were in its visuals and unique concept of magnetism, and its weaknesses were its heightened difficulty and sub-par controls. There were also frequent comparisons made to the Crash Bandicoot series due to the similar "running into the screen" viewpoint and animal rides.

Jason Weitzner of GameFan came to a similar conclusion as the eventual reviewers of the game and commented on the difficulty of the Japanese import, stating that "This game's tough" and "difficult enough to discourage its target audience." He went on to explain that changes would be needed for the US release especially the "get hit once and die gameplay." As it turned out, this was something that was fixed with power-ups granting extra "hits" being added to the English language version. Anoop Gantayat of IGN praised the presentation, graphics, and sound, but criticized the gameplay's "silly definition of difficulty", "slippery sense of control" as well as its lasting appeal. He went on to explain that the biggest flaw of the game is level mastery due to the difficulty being based on "trial and error deaths" which can become frustrating to the player. Xavier Burn of GameSpot shared a lot of the same views as Gantayat, mentioning "impressive presentation" and criticizing the "frustrating control issues" in the Japanese import. Burn mentioned that the core concept of magnetism is "interesting and easy enough to grasp" and ultimately "a solid and unique enough game to warrant a look". Dave Halverson of Gamers' Republic described the same Japanese import as a "hard-core old-school platformer" and framed this difficulty in a positive light. Halverson was also positive about appearance, character design and sound, stating that "every facet of the game...are tailored to perfection". His view on the controls conflicted with that of Burn and Gantayat, with Halverson describing them as "pinpoint accurate controls". Francesca Reyes of NextGen said of the game, "It's cute. It's addictive. But ultimately, it's been done plenty of times before."
