= Baby Pals =

2007 video game

- European cover art of Baby Pals
- Developer: Brain Toys
- Publishers: JP: Interchannel; NA: Crave Entertainment; EU: THQ
- Platform: Nintendo DS
- Release: NA: November 19, 2007; EU: March 7, 2008; AU: March 13, 2008; JP: July 17, 2008
- Genres: Action, life simulation
- Mode: Single-player

Baby Pals is a simulation-style video game for the Nintendo DS developed by American studio Brain Toys that released in North America and in the PAL region in late 2007 and early 2008. The objective of the game is to take care of a virtual baby through certain tasks as feeding, bathing, and teaching just like a real father or mother would do. Players can choose the gender of the baby.

== Reception ==
Reception

Review scores
Publication	Score
IGN	4/10
Pocket Gamer	3.5/5.0

IGN rated the game 4 of 10, stating that it is "disturbing. And creepy. And inappropriate. […] [It] doesn't succeed at being a welcoming, inviting experience […] I'd really recommend passing this one by."

== Alleged subliminal message ==
According to news reports, a mother who purchased the game for her child reported that the babies in the game say something that sounds like "Islam is the light" under certain circumstances. The babies in the game generally do not have any spoken dialog. However, according to a representative from the game's publisher, Crave Entertainment, the sound bit came from "a recording of a 5-month-old baby babbling non-intelligible phrases." He pointed out that "the baby being recorded was too young to pronounce these words let alone a whole grammatically correct phrase."

== See also ==
- Purr Pals
