= Man vs. Wild (video game) =

2011 video game

- North American cover art
- Developers: Floor 84 Studio; Scientifically Proven
- Publisher: Crave Games
- Engine: Vicious Engine 2
- Platforms: PlayStation 3 Wii; Xbox 360
- Release: AS: April 18, 2011; NA: April 26, 2011
- Genre: Action
- Mode: Single-player

Man vs. Wild is an action video game inspired by the Man vs. Wild survival television series. In it, the player takes on the role of host Bear Grylls to survive the hardships of various environments. It was developed by Floor 84 Studio and Scientifically Proven and published by Crave Games under license from the Discovery Channel.

The game released on April 18, 2011, in Asia, and on April 26, 2011, in North America, for the PlayStation 3, Wii, and Xbox 360. The game was supposed to have handheld releases as well, on the Nintendo DS and PlayStation Portable but both versions were ultimately cancelled.

== Gameplay ==
Players control Bear Grylls in a third-person role-playing adventure and must use survival techniques such as gathering materials, catching food, and creating tools to survive. The game consists of five expeditions that take players through diverse landscapes and weather conditions, including: the Everglades, the Sahara, the Rocky Mountains, a deserted jungle island, and Patagonia. The gameplay is a mix of exploration, mini-games, and puzzle solving.

== Reception ==
Reception

Aggregate score
Aggregator	Score
Metacritic	50/100

Review scores
Publication	Score
GameZone	6.5/10
Jeuxvideo.com	6/20
Official Xbox Magazine (US)	5/10

Man vs. Wild received "mixed or average" reviews according to review aggregator Metacritic. GameZone rated the game 6.5/10, stating that "Man vs. Wild is a fun, easy game based on a successful television series. Those looking for the next life-changing experience will probably find themselves disappointed. On the other hand, they might learn skills that may be helpful in the event that they're actually stranded in the wild one day."

Jeuxvideo.com rated the game 6/20, stating that "Fans of the show were waiting for this game with a mixture of excitement and mistrust and unfortunately it was not going to be successful. We find ourselves facing a completely sloppy game and far from being fun as the survival aspect is absent. Fortunately, the ordeal is short-lived: no more than 4 hours." The Official Xbox Magazine rated the game 5/10, stating that "It's not terrible, but not even the ability to make Grylls drink urine or hollow out a camel for shelter are enough to make it compelling."
