= Lobotomy Software =

American video game developer

Lobotomy Studios
- 1996–1998 logo
- Company type: Subsidiary
- Industry: Video games
- Founded: January 13, 1993
- Defunct: 1999
- Headquarters: Redmond, Washington, U.S.
- Key people: Paul Lange; Ezra Dreisbach
- Products: PowerSlave
- Parent: Crave Entertainment (1998–1999)

Lobotomy Software was an American video game developer founded in 1993 and based in Redmond, Washington. The company ported Quake and Duke Nukem 3D to the Saturn and developed the first-person shooter PowerSlave (titled Exhumed in Europe). Lobotomy Software was acquired by Crave Entertainment in 1998 and renamed to Lobotomy Studios before closing a year later.

== History ==
Lobotomy Software was founded in 1993, when a group of friends working at Nintendo of America left to form their own company, becoming the creative department of Lobotomy, with the programmers coming from Manley & Associates (a developer acquired by Electronic Arts in 1996). They originally worked out of co-founder Paul Lange's apartment, but after a few months set up an office in Redmond, Washington. The team began working on game demos, one of which later became the first-person shooter PowerSlave.

Shortly after PowerSlave was released, Sega secured the rights from GT Interactive to publish Duke Nukem 3D and Quake. Sega originally handed the projects to two other developers, but were unhappy with their work. Deadlines for the two games were set just a few months apart, and as such their development considerably overlapped.

The Saturn ports of Quake and Duke Nukem 3D both use the SlaveDriver engine Lobotomy created for PowerSlave. Lobotomy Software had ported Quake to the PlayStation, but could not find a publisher, which exacerbated their financial troubles.

In 1998, Lobotomy Software was acquired by Crave Entertainment and renamed Lobotomy Studios. The company worked on a Caesars Palace gambling game for the Nintendo 64, but after a year of development, the game was postponed and eventually cancelled. At that point, Lobotomy Studios was closed and employees were let go or given the option to be relocated to another position at Crave Entertainment. The next title that the team would have worked on was a sequel to PowerSlave simply titled PowerSlave 2, which was going to be a third-person shooter and use a different game engine.

== Games ==
- PowerSlave (September 26, 1996) Saturn, MS-DOS, PlayStation. Includes the hidden mini-game Death Tank.

Ports to Saturn

- Quake (October 31, 1997)
- Duke Nukem 3D (October 31, 1997). Includes the hidden mini-game Death Tank Zwei.
