= Crayola Treasure Adventures =

2007 video game

- Developer: DC Studios (Note: Credited as Firebrand Games in the PAL release.)
- Publishers: NA: Crave Entertainment; PAL: Ignition Entertainment
- Platform: Nintendo DS
- Release: NA: October 1, 2007; PAL: March 28, 2008
- Genre: Adventure game
- Mode: Single player

Crayola Treasure Adventures is a video game based on the Crayola company line of crayons developed by DC Studios and published by Crave Entertainment in North America and Ignition Entertainment in PAL regions for the Nintendo DS. The player is a person lost on an island searching for treasure, with only a map and crayons.

== Gameplay ==
The game plays as a virtual colouring book. The game contains 100 colouring book pages and 120 of Crayola's signature shades, which match up to their real-life equivalents. Different settings let the player apply colour either in the patchy style of a real crayon, or in a more smooth texture. The title has unlockable areas and pictures.

== Development ==
A partnership between Crave Entertainment and Crayola to being Crayola themed video games into the market was announced on March 14, 2007. The game premiered at the 2007 E3. The title was due to be released onto store shelves in September of that year, but this was postponed to October.

== Reception ==
Reception

Aggregate score
Aggregator	Score
Metacritic	65/100

Review scores
Publication	Score
Eurogamer	5/10
GamesMaster	64%
GameZone	6/10
IGN	8/10
Jeuxvideo.com	5/20
NGamer	60%
Pocket Gamer	2/5
Den of Geek	3/5

The game received "mixed" reviews according to the review aggregation website Metacritic. Jeuxvideo.com felt that the game's flaws would push aspiring artists to seek real-life colouring books instead. Den of Geek felt it was an "excellent puzzle and colouring game for younger children". Pocket Gamer felt the title was much better as a virtual colouring book than as a game. Eurogamer disliked the tiny amount of adventure game content.
