= Killer Loop =

1999 video game

- Developer: VCC Entertainment
- Publisher: Crave Entertainment
- Platforms: PlayStation, Microsoft Windows, Dreamcast, Arcade
- Release: PlayStation: EU: 1 March 1999; NA: 17 November 1999; Windows; 1999; Dreamcast: NA: 21 July 2000; EU: 25 August 2000; Arcade; 2000

Killer Loop (also known as MagForce Racing for Dreamcast) is a futuristic racing game released in 1999-2000. It was developed by VCC Entertainment and published by Crave Entertainment.

== Demo release ==
The Hawaii level of this game was released as a demo with the tune 'Coppermine' from the soundtrack to accompany it. The demo was featured on an Official UK PlayStation Magazine free demo disc (number 52) in December 1999. This helped to advertise the game for the PlayStation console.

== Development team ==
Some of the developers who worked on this game (including Tammo 'kb' Hinrichs), whose names appear in the default high scores, went on to form the Farbrausch group of the Demoscene.

== Reception ==
Reception

Aggregate score
Aggregator	Score		
Aggregator	Dreamcast	PC	PS
GameRankings	63%	84%	64%

Review scores
Publication	Score		
Publication	Dreamcast	PC	PS
AllGame	1.5/5	N/A	1.5/5
CNET Gamecenter	6/10	N/A	5/10
Electronic Gaming Monthly	4.17/10 (Note: Three critics of Electronic Gaming Monthly gave the Dreamcast version each a score of 5/10, 2/10, and 5.5/10.)	N/A	N/A
Game Informer	N/A	N/A	6/10
GameFan	50%	N/A	84%
GamePro	N/A	N/A	4/5
GameSpot	6.9/10	N/A	6.1/10
GameSpy	6/10	N/A	N/A
IGN	7.7/10	8.1/10	4.8/10
Next Generation	2/5	N/A	2/5
Official U.S. PlayStation Magazine	N/A	N/A	3/5
PC Gamer (US)	N/A	79%	N/A

The PC version of Killer Loop received favourable reviews, while the PlayStation version and MagForce Racing received mixed reviews, according to the review aggregation website GameRankings. Jeff Lundrigan of NextGen gave both console versions negative reviews in two separate issues, saying of the PlayStation version: "Six tracks and six vehicles spread over four classes with no two-player mode – you do the math. Although a competent effort, this is the definition of a placeholder title, and you've seen it all before" (#61, January 2000); and later of MagForce Racing: "There's nothing here you haven't seen done before and done better" (#69, September 2000).
