= Whirl Tour =

2002 video game

- Developer: Papaya Studio
- Publisher: Vivendi Universal Games
- Composer: Peanut Butter Wolf
- Platforms: GameCube, PlayStation 2
- Release: NA: November 5, 2002; EU: March 21, 2003
- Genre: Sports
- Modes: Single-player, multiplayer

Whirl Tour is a sports video game developed by Papaya Studio and published by Vivendi Universal Games for GameCube and PlayStation 2. The game's story follows a roadie named Wasa B. who must rescue his kidnapped band, Flipside, from the evil Dr. Skeezkicks.

== Story ==
The band Flipside is performing at a sold-out show, when suddenly, the band members are abruptly sucked into a portal. The band's roadie, Wasa B., jumps on his scooter and rides into the portal after the kidnapped musicians. He is tasked with scooting through eight levels, defeating the bosses who guard the portal's power source, and ultimately facing-off with Dr. Skeezkicks, the evil mastermind behind the abduction. Each area possesses its own challenges, and the player must refine Wasa B.'s skills to the best their ability to emerge victorious and save his friends.

== Gameplay ==
The game finds the player's character on a scooter; each session has a time limit and takes place in a gridded environment. Each reminiscent of a skatepark, the player is encouraged to perform various tricks by utilizing button combinations, which earn points used to unlock customization. There are six playable game modes, eight levels, seven unlockable characters, and ten unlockable scooters. In each Story Mode and Co-op Story Mode level, there are seven objectives to finish. Objectives range from performing a trick in a certain spot, toppling over an object while grinding, or earning a set of collectibles.

Players are encouraged to earn a score within a set time frame, recover three music discs, defeat the two bosses and destroy the generator in each stage. After a set number of stages, the player accesses a racing stage in which they must place first to advance. Special Bonus Levels can be unlocked by finishing all objectives in one level.

== Development ==
The game was originally planned to be published by Crave Entertainment. Vivendi Universal Games purchased the publishing rights in September 2002 in a partnership with Crave.

== Reception ==
Reception

Aggregate score
Aggregator	Score	
Aggregator	GameCube	PS2
Metacritic	61/100	58/100

Review scores
Publication	Score	
Publication	GameCube	PS2
Game Informer	7.5/10	N/A
Gamekult	N/A	3/10
GameSpot	6.5/10	6.5/10
GameSpy	65%	3/5
IGN	5.1/10	5.1/10
Jeuxvideo.com	10/20	10/20
Nintendo Power	3/5	N/A
Official U.S. PlayStation Magazine	N/A	2/5
PlayStation: The Official Magazine	N/A	5/10
X-Play	2/5	2/5

Whirl Tour received "mixed" reviews on both platforms according to the review aggregation website Metacritic. Many critics pointed out the game's unoriginality, comparing it unfavorably to Tony Hawk's Pro Skater (1999). Some, however, praised its controls and presentation.
