= Dragon Dance (video game) =

1998 video game

- Developer: Natsume Co., Ltd.
- Publisher: Crave Entertainment
- Platform: Game Boy Color
- Release: JP: 18 December 1998; NA: 30 September 2000
- Genre: Action
- Modes: Single-player, multiplayer

Dragon Dance (released in Japan in 1998 as Pocket Color Block) is a 2000 action game for the Game Boy Color developed by Natsume Co., Ltd. and published in the United States by Crave Entertainment. The game is a paddle-and-ball game similar to the arcade video game Breakout.

== Gameplay ==
A screenshot of Dragon Dance.

Compared to Breakout or Arkanoid, Dragon Dance is an action game in which the player uses a paddle to bounce a ball to clear several rows of blocks. Dragon Dance features several special features. The paddle is a dragon that elongates when moved and shrinks when stationary, encouraging players to constantly move the paddle. The game features a number of power-ups, including to stop time, to change the ball's direction in play, create a blocking net or shoot fireballs. The game features 100 levels, with a boss level every ten levels in which players defeat a 'dragon deity' using the same techniques as on other levels, with the boss also moving and firing back.

== Development ==
An early NTSC prototype build of Dragon Dance was discovered and preserved in 2022. The prototype contains a splash screen for Infogrames, suggesting that the company was originally intended to be the publisher of Dragon Dance in the United States.

== Reception ==
Reception

Review scores
Publication	Score
AllGame	3.5/5
IGN	7/10
Game Boy Xtreme	43%

Dragon Dance received mixed reviews, with critics finding limited differentiation of the game from the arcade games its gameplay was based upon. Game Boy Xtreme stated the game had "novel ideas, but not all work well", dismissing the game as "not a great Breakout clone". Craig Harris of IGN stated "this game doesn't offer much more than what's already been done to the design in the past", but stated "as a Breakout clone, (it's) a really good one", praising the game for its large number of levels and finding it a "much better option" thanSuper Breakout, which had been re-released for the Game Boy Color in 1999.

In a retrospective review, Aaron Vark of Hardcore Gaming 101 conceded that Dragon Dance "probably didn't get much attention due to being a Breakout-type game on the Game Boy Color in the year 2000, which by that point had games with more depth and content," noting that "half the game seems very bland while the other half has a lot of genuinely interesting gimmicks." Overall, he praised the game, stating "Today, (Dragon Dance) is a hidden gem, and while a good chunk of it is run of the mill, it has a lot of interesting ideas that still let it hold up today if one is willing to tolerate its flaws."
