= MX World Tour Featuring Jamie Little =

2005 video game

- Developer: Impulse Games
- Publishers: NA: Crave Entertainment; EU: Play-It
- Platforms: PlayStation 2, Xbox
- Release: NA: April 5, 2005; EU: September 9, 2005 (PS2)
- Genre: Racing
- Modes: Single-player, multiplayer

MX World Tour Featuring Jamie Little is a motorcycle racing video game, developed by Impulse Games and published by Crave Entertainment and Play It for PlayStation 2 and Xbox in 2005. It features sports and racing commentator Jamie Little on the cover.

== Reception ==
Reception

Aggregate score
Aggregator	Score	
Aggregator	PS2	Xbox
Metacritic	52/100	51/100

Review scores
Publication	Score	
Publication	PS2	Xbox
GameSpot	4.9/10	4.9/10
GameSpy	2.5/5	2.5/5
GameZone	6.8/10	6.5/10
IGN	5/10	5/10
TeamXbox	N/A	4.5/10

The game received "mixed" reviews on both platforms according to the review aggregation website Metacritic.
