= Robotica =

1995 video game

- North American box art
- Developers: Micronet; Genki
- Publishers: NA: Acclaim Entertainment; WW: Sega
- Platform: Sega Saturn
- Release: JP: March 24, 1995; EU: November 1995; NA: 1995
- Genre: First-person shooter
- Mode: Single player

Robotica, also known as Robotica Cybernation Revolt in Europe and Deadalus (ダイダロス) in Japan, is a first-person shooter video game developed by Micronet for the Sega Saturn.

== Plot ==
The game's events are set in the year 2877. In 2077, the world's peacekeeping unions, such as the United Nations and the European Union, collapsed after years of global tensions, forcing humanity to establish a planetary government in order to maintain order. A government operating as the World Silent Security Service, also known as the W.S.S.S., is established and world peace is restored. The WSSS takes control of both the planet Earth and outer space, establishing its headquarters on the Central Control Station Daedalus in earth orbit. The WSSS eradicates the control of all previous unions and organizations and unites the whole of humanity under its control for over 800 years. However, with all of its original creators gone by that point in time, humanity questions the justification of Deadulus's rule, and some begin to rebel against the government in the wake of its so-called archaic policies. The leading rebel group in this massive rebellion, the Reformist Faction, sends three elite pilots of the highly sophisticated Laocorn-class Assault Robots on a covert mission to destroy Daedalus. Once inside, two Laocorns are immediately destroyed, leaving the one survivor, the player character, to face Daedalus' massive robot armies and transverse vast, dark corridors in his quest to destroy Daedalus and to save humanity.

== Gameplay ==
The player has to fight through thirty floors of the Deadalus space station to destroy the core at the top. The floors are randomly generated. For every floor of the station there is a key card in a random location, required to unlock the elevator to the next stage. A few floors require the player to seek and destroy the station's reactor cores. The player can also find floor maps and light switches for darkened floors, but neither are required for progress.

The player's mech-armor, the Laocorn, is equipped with four different weapons and a generator that enables the mech to perform several abilities. The weapons consist of an arm-punch, vulcan, laser gun and missile launcher, each of which is upgradable in power and ammunition count. There are kamikaze enemies that appear if the player stays too long on a floor that carry items that, if picked up, degrade whichever weapon they are armed with at that time. The Laocorn's generator abilities are hover, allowing the mech to hover a few feet over energy grids; refresh, which replenishes the mech's energy; plasma barrier, which serves as a temporary shield; and the blaze laser, which destroys every enemy on screen. Each ability consumes generator energy, which can be refilled through pick-up items.

== Reception ==
Reception

Review scores
Publication	Score
Electronic Gaming Monthly	7.125/10
Next Generation	3/5
CD Player	4/10
Maximum	2/5
Sega Saturn Magazine	70%

The four reviewers of Electronic Gaming Monthly described Robotica as one of the best first person shooters to date. They cited the graphics, storyline, and most especially the deep strategic approach to combat as the game's strong points, though some of the reviewers felt the levels had too little variation between them. In contrast, Sega Saturn Magazine accessed it as a mediocre Doom clone, citing dull gameplay, monotonous visuals, lack of appropriate music, and absence of any gore. GamePro was also underwhelmed by the game, saying that it plays very smoothly but suffers from a lack of imagination in the enemies and the backgrounds. They concluded that "ultimately, it's too simplistic to be much more than ... a nice waste of time." Maximum praised the "dark, eerie feel" created by the graphics and sound effects but criticized the gameplay as simplistic and lacking in variety. They concluded the game to be "simply not worth the money." Next Generation reviewed the Japanese release as Daedalus, and stated that "Deadalus is a good bit of pretty packaging without much on the inside." In their late 1996 overview of the Saturn library, Next Generation gave brief reviews of both the North American and Japanese releases, giving one out of five stars to the former but three out of five stars to the latter. They commented that the game lacks impact and excitement.

In a retrospective, Hardcore Gamer said that "Robtica's engine is underwhelming – even by the standards of its era – with an inconsistent frame rate that often drops to a sluggish slow-motion. It's not the best-performing or looking game, and there are far superior shooters on the Saturn that fare better in visuals and performance." In early 1997 Sega Saturn Magazine's Rich Leadbetter ranked Robotica the worst of the five first person shooters released for the Saturn in Europe up to that point (the others being Hexen: Beyond Heretic, Alien Trilogy, Doom, and PowerSlave), remarking that "although it is pretty smooth and quite enjoyable to begin with, the game is crushingly boring with very little to differentiate between one level and the rest."
