= Death Tank =

1996 video game

- Death Tank Zwei start screen
- Developer(s): Lobotomy Software
- Platform(s): Sega Saturn
- Release: 1996

Death Tank is a 1996 competitive multiplayer, 2D artillery game developed by Ezra Dreisbach of Lobotomy Software. Influenced by Scorched Earth, the gameplay is real-time instead of turn-based. It supports two to seven players, represented by differently-colored tanks, with a range of weapons. The terrain on which this occurs is heavily deformed during play.

The original Death Tank was a hidden bonus game in the Sega Saturn port of PowerSlave (1996). An update, Death Tank Zwei, was hidden in the Saturn version of Duke Nukem 3D (1997).

In a 1996 interview Lobotomy Software co-founder Brian McNeely said that Dreisbach "threw [Death Tank] together in his spare time. We play it every day, religiously." The title screen shows the red and blue tanks because these were the colors favored by Dreisbach and Jeff Blazier, who had an ongoing rivalry in the game.

== Xbox Live Arcade version ==
Dreisbach, working with Snowblind Studios, developed a standalone version of the game for Xbox Live Arcade. It was released on February 18, 2009.

A version of Death Tank Zwei is included as an extra in this release, which can be unlocked by shooting down a supply plane in the main game. There are a number of minor differences between this new version and the original; it lacks the title screen (and Death Tank theme), options and player selection screens. The game has an upper limit of four players (instead of the original seven), and there are a number of changes to the names of the weapons.

== Reception ==
Death Tank appears in the video game reference book 1001 Video Games You Must Play Before You Die edited by Tony Mott and published in October 2010 by Universe Publishing.
