= AeroWings =

1999 video game

- Developer: CRI Middleware
- Publishers: JP: CRI Middleware; WW: Crave Entertainment
- Director: Toru Kujirai
- Platform: Dreamcast
- Release: JP: March 4, 1999; NA: September 9, 1999; EU: October 29, 1999
- Genre: Flight simulator
- Modes: Single-player, multiplayer

AeroWings, known in Japan as Aero Dancing featuring Blue Impulse (エアロダンシング featuring Blue Impulse(フューチャリング ブルーインパルス), Earo Danshingu Fyūcharingu Burū Inparusu), is a flight simulator for Sega's Dreamcast video game console. The player can train with squads, learn the ropes of handling the aircraft, and doing tricks after mastering the different stunts.

The difference between the Japanese and other versions outside the country was, as the Japanese version was only licensed by Japan Air Self-Defense Force's Blue Impulse aerobatic display team, it featured liveries that of the team.

== Gameplay ==
Screenshot

AeroWings is focused on the formation flight and aerobatic, and the player is a flight team leader. The game is considered as the first true attempt of combat flight simulation on console. Unlike the arcade-oriented Ace Combat, AeroWings series provides fairly accurate flight physics, 3D cockpits views, real weapons loads, possibilities to take off, land on airbase or carrier, refueling and a replay video system which is able to record the entire flight and offering the possibility to create own movie with more than 30 different cameras (including the popular "shaky cam").

== Reception ==
Reception

Aggregate score
Aggregator	Score
GameRankings	72%

Review scores
Publication	Score
AllGame	3/5
CNET Gamecenter	8/10
Edge	4/10
Electronic Gaming Monthly	5/10
Famitsu	30/40
Game Informer	7/10
GamePro	(S.L.) 4/5 (Note: GamePro gave the game three 4/5 scores for graphics, sound, and overall fun factor, and 3.5/5 for control in one review.) (T.R.) 3.5/5 (Note: GamePro gave the game 4.5/5 for graphics, 2.5/5 for sound, 3/5 for control, and 3.5/5 for overall fun factor in another review.)
GameRevolution	B
GameSpot	6.6/10
GameSpy	4/10
IGN	8/10

The game received above-average reviews according to the review aggregation website GameRankings. In Japan, Famitsu gave it a score of 30 out of 40.

== Sequels ==
=== Aero Wings 2: Airstrike / Aero Dancing F ===
The second game in the series is AeroWings 2: Airstrike, or AeroWings 2: Strike Force in UK. Unlike its predecessor, it features aerial combat simulation. It was released for the Dreamcast and Windows.

=== Aero Dancing I ===
The third game, Aero Dancing i, was only released in Japan, for the Dreamcast and Windows. The "i" stands for Internet, as it was the first title of the series with an online mode. It was also the first in the series to offer air-to-ground missions. On release, Famitsu magazine scored the game a 31 out of 40.

=== Aero Elite / Aero Dancing 4 ===
The fourth game in the series is Aero Elite: Combat Academy. It was only released for the PlayStation 2. The last sequel of the series was also considered the best: quality graphics, very detailed and animated 3D plane models, over 60 planes to fly (including Mig 29, SU27, Mirage2000, Harrier, A10, Tornado, etc.), challenging missions and new original features like the "scramble" mode - a random interception mission where a player must take off, intercept an unknown intruder plane, take pictures to identify it, then return to the base and land to finish the mission.
