= PowerSlave =

1996 video game

- North American MS-DOS cover art
- Developers: Lobotomy Software; Nightdive Studios (PowerSlave Exhumed)
- Publishers: NA: Playmates Interactive Entertainment; EU: BMG Interactive; WW: Nightdive Studios (PowerSlave Exhumed); WW: Throwback Entertainment (PowerSlave Exhumed)
- Director: Brian McNeely
- Producer: Chris Archer
- Designer: Brian McNeely
- Programmer: Ezra Dreisbach
- Composer: Scott Branston
- Engine: Build (PC); SlaveDriver (console); KEX Engine (PowerSlave Exhumed)
- Platforms: Sega Saturn: MS-DOS; PlayStation; Linux; Macintosh; Windows; Nintendo Switch; PlayStation 4; PlayStation 5; Xbox One; Xbox Series X/S
- Release: September 19, 1996: Saturn; EU: September 19, 1996; JP: November 29, 1996; NA: December 31, 1996 MS-DOS; NA: January 1997; EU: 1997 PlayStation; NA: March 1, 1997; EU: April 1997 Classic; Linux, Macintosh, Windows; WW: November 19, 2020 PowerSlave Exhumed; Switch, PS4, PS5, Windows, Xbox One, Xbox Series X/S; WW: February 10, 2022
- Genres: First-person shooter, Metroidvania
- Modes: Single-player, multiplayer

PowerSlave, known as Exhumed in Europe and 1999 AD: Resurrection of the Pharaoh (Note: Japanese: 西暦 1999：ファラオの復活, Hepburn: Seireki 1999: Pharaoh no Fukkatsu) in Japan, is a 1996 first-person shooter game developed by Lobotomy Software and published by Playmates Interactive Entertainment in North America, and BMG Interactive in Europe and Japan. It was released in North America, Europe and Japan, for the Sega Saturn, PlayStation, and MS-DOS over the course of a year from late 1996 to late 1997. The MS-DOS version of PowerSlave was added to the GOG store on November 19, 2020.

Developed by Nightdive Studios in partnership with Throwback Entertainment, an enhanced port for the PC and modern consoles combining elements of the Saturn and PlayStation versions, PowerSlave Exhumed, was announced on August 14, 2021, and released on February 10, 2022.

== Plot ==
PowerSlave is set in and around the ancient Egyptian city of Karnak in the late 20th century. The city has been seized by unknown forces, with a special crack team of hardened soldiers sent to the valley of Karnak, to uncover the source of this trouble. However, on the journey there, the player's helicopter is shot down and the player barely escapes. The player is sent in to the valley as the hero to save Karnak and the World. The player must battle hordes of extraterrestrial insectoid beings known as the Kilmaat, as well as their various minions, which include mummies, Anubis soldiers, scorpions, and evil spirits. The player's course of action is directed by the spirit of King Ramses, whose mummy was exhumed from its tomb by the Kilmaat, who seek to resurrect him and use his powers to control the world. The game's mid-game boss is the god Set.

In the console versions, there are two endings, depending on the player's course of action during the game. In the good ending, the protagonist has collected eight pieces of a radio transmission device, so he can send a rescue signal and be extracted from the Valley. After reclaiming the mummy of Ramses, the Pharaoh thanks him for his effort, and promises the protagonist that he will inherit Ramses' Earthly kingdom, and that the Gods will bless him with eternal life and make him ruler of the world. After escaping the collapsing tomb, the protagonist is indeed rewarded as such, and becomes a powerful and benevolent Pharaoh of the entire planet. In the bad ending, the player has failed to collect all eight pieces of the radio transmitter, and the protagonist is subsequently buried in the tomb of Ramses, only to be excavated centuries later by the now ruling forces of the Kilmaat and put on display as the last human corpse.

In the MS-DOS version, there are two slightly different endings, again depending on the player's course of action, but only in the final stage. The final stage takes place aboard the Kilmaat mothership, where a nuclear weapon has been armed and is set to go off in 15 minutes, and has enough power to obliterate the planet. In the bad ending, which occurs if the player loses all of their lives or fails to disarm the bomb in time, Earth is destroyed in a massive nuclear blast. In the good ending, which occurs if the player makes it to the bomb on time, the Kilmaat retreat from the planet, but the main character is stuck on their ship and needs to find a way off.

== Gameplay ==
Gameplay in both the original PC version and console versions follows the first-person shooter gameplay. This includes elements from the genre, such as health refills and a selection of different weapons, are present.

In both the console version and remastered versions, PowerSlave Exhumed, the game was described as having a more Metroidvania-like design. as the player obtains new weapons and ancient artifacts over the course of the game, providing them with abilities that allow them to explore previously unreachable areas, all of which are connected with an overworld map. Such abilities include being able to jump higher, levitate, breathe underwater, walk in lava and walk through force fields.

== History ==
=== Development ===
PowerSlave was Lobotomy Software's first full game, with development starting in May 1995 for the PC. Lobotomy co-founder Brian McNeely recounted:

As work began on the 3D engine, our art and design teams began putting the framework of the game together on paper. We devoted a few weeks to this until we were happy with all of our concepts. At the same time, David Lawson began modifying and adding new features to BREW, our world editing tool. Paul Schreiber created a tool called PeepShow that we used to set up all of the animations in the game, and Jeff Blazier developed an editor for object placement and ambient lighting. When all of these elements were ready, we started putting it all together to make a game.

At one point, the MS-DOS version was to be released by 3D Realms as one of their games to show off the power of the Build engine. During this time, the game was known by its working title Ruins: Return of the Gods. Apogee Software released screenshots of the early working version with a slideshow of another of its published titles, Mystic Towers. 3D Realms eventually dropped the title, which was then picked up and published by Playmates Interactive Entertainment.

Programmer Ezra Dreisbach thought to incorporate dynamic light sourcing into the console versions after seeing Loaded on the PlayStation, since the walls in PowerSlave were already being Gouraud shaded for the static torch lights. Though Lobotomy, like most developers, found it easier to make 3D games for the PlayStation than for the Saturn, they elected to develop the Saturn version first so as to beat other upcoming Saturn first person shooters to the market. One of the console's two CPUs was used for drawing walls, while the other handles everything else in the game.

The U.S. title PowerSlave is a reference to the Iron Maiden album of the same name, which also features an Egyptian-themed cover.

The game is narrated by iconic film trailer announcer Don LaFontaine.

=== Releases ===
==== Console ====
The first version of the game to be released was on the Sega Saturn, shortly followed by a release on the PlayStation, with tweaked gameplay, added architecture, some different levels, and other changes. Both of these versions are based on Lobotomy Software's SlaveDriver engine and feature a true 3D world, similar to Quake. The same engine was used to power the Sega Saturn versions of Duke Nukem 3D and Quake.

Because the levels designed for the Saturn version were not well-suited to the PlayStation technology, Lobotomy redesigned them to take better advantage of the specific hardware. Besides some changes in the levels (rooms in one version that are not in another, added architecture in the PlayStation version), the levels Amun Mines, Heket Marsh, Set Palace, Cavern of Peril, and Kilmaat Colony are almost completely different between the two versions. In the Sega Saturn version, ammo and health pick-ups dropped by an airborne enemy remain airborne, as opposed to falling to the ground in the PlayStation version. There are exclusive powerups on the Sega Saturn such as the All-Seeing Eye, Invisibility and Weapon Boost. Also exclusive to the Sega Saturn is the ability to bomb-boost, which is similar to rocket jumping in other FPS games.

Sprites are represented in 2D, similar to games such as Doom and Duke Nukem 3D. The game features colored dynamic lighting, but only in the console versions.

Though each weapon has its own separate supply of ammunition, ammunition pick-ups are general, and apply to whichever weapon the player is using at the time they are acquired.

Level progression is non-linear, letting the player go to any previous unlocked level at any time. Some levels have areas which are only accessible after getting a certain ability or weapon, similar to the Metroid series.

Additionally, there are eight pieces of a radio transmission device hidden in eight of the stages. Stages with a hidden transmitter piece will emit a steady beeping noise on the overworld map, and can be heard beeping when the player is near their location. Collecting these pieces will affect the ending of the game.

Exclusive to the Sega Saturn version is a hidden minigame: Death Tank, which is unlocked by collecting all 23 Team Dolls hidden in the game. Because it was released in PAL regions before Death Tank was complete, the PAL Sega Saturn version does not include Death Tank.

On August 16, 2025, the source code for the Saturn version of PowerSlave was released under the GPL on GitHub by the game's programmer, Ezra Dreisbach.

==== MS-DOS ====
The MS-DOS version of PowerSlave features many differences from the console versions. The MS-DOS version was built on the Build engine, licensed from 3D Realms. The version used is a slightly earlier version of the engine, made sometime before the version used in Duke Nukem 3D. The light sourcing from the SlaveDriver engine is not used; the Build engine's own light sourcing is used instead; the game also uses "fake" dynamic lighting where sectors light up as projectiles or "glowing" objects in general pass through.

The HUD interface is different; featuring an ammo counter, lungs (oxygen levels) for swimming and animated mana and blood vessels. Players have usable Mana energy that can cast spells once the spell has been acquired (e.g. collecting a torch allows the player to use energy to illuminate dark areas). Ammo is not universal, instead of blue orbs usable for all weapons, separate ammo is needed. Grenades are used instead of Amun mines. Some sprites are different (e.g. M60 machine gun), sprites are larger and more animated in general. Audible words are used for the player character instead of grunts. Mummies fire a "white skull" attack, or a partly homing red one, that when hit, turns the player into a mummy momentarily, additionally granting him with the most powerful weapon in the game, the Mummy Staff, which can be used once to destroy all enemies within range of the player. Checkpoints are placed throughout the level by indication of golden scarabs and saving happens automatically between levels.

Levels are conducted in a more linear format; players can replay previously completed levels, but there is no incentive to do so any longer, as backtracking is not present. The Manacle of Power fires a lightning cloud above the enemy, rather than firing lightning bolts from the player's hands. Most of the artifacts from the console versions are not present (except the Sobek Mask, which is a spell in this version). The powerups in the Sega Saturn version are included as spells (invisibility, invincibility and double damage). The Ring of Ra weapon is not included. Weapons pause to reload after a certain number of shots are fired. Some enemies have different death animations when killed by fire/grenades; bosses have longer death animations. There are extra lives instead of health extensions. The Amnit enemies are not included; instead there is the giant Ammut miniboss which has ramming and biting attacks. There is additional story text. The transmitter, which was a set of eight key items needed in the console versions to get the better ending, is not in the MS-DOS version per se, but it is seen before the final stage of the game, where the player receives orders to attack the Kilmaat ship. Likewise, the Team Dolls are not in the MS-DOS version.

==== 21st century ports ====
On May 24, 2015, an unofficial port based on the PlayStation version called Powerslave EX was released by Samuel "Kaiser" Villarreal for free. On January 2, 2017, Kaiser released the source code to his port under the GPLv3 license on GitHub.

In May 2015, it was announced that publisher Nightdive Studios had acquired the game rights for a digital distribution re-release. Villarreal, who had since joined the studio, was set to continue his work on this new, official remaster. The game would be formally announced as PowerSlave Exhumed on August 14, 2021, without a prospective release date; it was subsequently released on February 10, 2022, for Nintendo Switch, PlayStation 4, Windows, Xbox One, and Xbox Series X/S. Instead of remastering any single version of the game, PowerSlave Exhumed combines various gameplay, visual and level design elements from the PlayStation, Saturn, and DOS versions of the original, alongside graphical enhancements such as support for higher resolutions, anti-aliasing, and visual CRT emulation.

In November 2020, new license holders Throwback Entertainment re-released the DOS version of the game as PowerSlave (DOS Classic Edition). This version of the game is also supported by the BuildGDX, PCExhumed and Raze source ports.

== Reception ==
Reception

Review scores
| Publication | Score |
|---|---|
| Electronic Gaming Monthly | 7.25/10 (SAT) |
| Famitsu | 6/10, 6/10, 6/10, 6/10 (SAT) |
| GameSpot | 5.4/10 (SAT); 5.6/10 (PC) |
| Next Generation | 2/5 (PC) |
| Sega Saturn Magazine | 92% (SAT) |
| Strana Igr | 8/10 (PS) |
| Game World Navigator | 7/10 (PC) |

PowerSlave Exhumed

Aggregate score
| Aggregator | Score |
|---|---|
| Metacritic | PC: 71/100; NS: 81/100 |

Review scores
| Publication | Score |
|---|---|
| Destructoid | 7/10 |
| Nintendo Life | 9/10 |

The Saturn version of PowerSlave sharply divided critics. GamePro gave it a perfect 5/5 in every category (graphics, sound, control, and FunFactor) and said its only weak point was that the variety of enemies could have been better. The reviewer found that the Egyptian theme, varied and distinctive scenery, light-sourcing effects, and platforming elements set it apart from other first-person shooters, and concluded, "PowerSlave should wake up some people: This awesome Saturn shooter combines puzzles, pyramids, and pulse-pounding excitement into one tight package, all using the Saturn's processors like no game has before." Rob Bright of Sega Saturn Magazine also bestowed it high praise, calling it "the game to set the standard for the first-person shoot 'em up genre." He especially complimented the fast pace, light-sourcing effects, need to unlock new areas by acquiring new abilities and revisiting levels, Egyptian scenery, and sound effects. However, the four reviewers of Electronic Gaming Monthly expressed more misgivings; while Shawn Smith hailed it for having more intelligent gameplay and plot than other first-person shooters, Dan Hsu and Sushi-X both said it is too similar to previous "Doom clones" to be of interest. Sushi-X added, "The enemies and traps are a little weak, relying more on your mistakes than your ingenuity." Crispin Boyer agreed that the game lacks originality but felt it was well-executed and enjoyable. Jeff Gerstmann of GameSpot also said the game lacks originality, and argued that "Graphically, Power Slave doesn't really break any new ground." He also criticized that the game starts with mundane enemies like spiders and birds, and takes too long to introduce genuinely menacing opponents.

In early 1997 Sega Saturn Magazine's Rich Leadbetter ranked PowerSlave the best of the five first person shooters released for the Saturn in Europe up to that point (the others being Hexen: Beyond Heretic, Alien Trilogy, Doom, and Robotica), remarking that, "As a one-player quest it starts off a bit dull, but later on its brilliance becomes self-evident."

The PlayStation version received comparatively little attention from critics. GamePro said it was "not as polished as the Saturn version," but still outstanding in absolute terms.

In his review of the PC version, Stephen Poole of GameSpot called the game flawed but fun, worth buying on discount. Both Poole and Next Generation compared it unfavorably to leading first-person shooters of the time, particularly Duke Nukem 3D. Both of them criticized the small weapons arsenal and inability to save at any point. Next Generation praised the level design and enemies, but ultimately felt PowerSlave failed to distinguish itself in the wave of first-person shooters being released for PC.

A 2005 1up.com article on the Sega Saturn mentioned that "PowerSlave featured one of the most impressive 3D engines in any 32-bit game."

== See also ==
- Serious Sam, a similar first-person shooter with Egyptian setting
