= Fifth generation of video game consoles =

Gaming generation from 1993 to 2006

The fifth generation era (also known as the 32-bit era, 64-bit era, or 3D era) refers to computer and video games, video game consoles, and handheld gaming consoles dating from approximately February 20, 1993, to March 23, 2006. (Note: The fifth generation of video game consoles began when Panasonic released the 3DO Interactive Multiplayer on October 4, 1993, in the American market. Then the fifth generation of video game console ended when the last console of the generation, the Sony PlayStation, was discontinued on March 23, 2006.) The best-selling home console was the Sony PlayStation, followed by the Nintendo 64 and the Sega Saturn. The PlayStation also had a redesigned version, the PSone, which was launched on July 7, 2000.

Some features that distinguished fifth generation consoles from previous fourth generation consoles include:

- 3D polygon graphics with texture mapping
- 3D graphics capabilities – lighting, Gouraud shading, anti-aliasing and texture filtering
- Optical disc (CD-ROM) game storage, allowing much larger storage space (up to 650 MB) than ROM cartridges
- CD quality audio recordings (music and speech) – PCM audio with 16-bit depth and 44.1 kHz sampling rate
- Wide adoption of full motion video, displaying pre-rendered computer animation or live action footage
- Analog controllers
- Display resolutions from 480i/480p to 576i
- Color depth up to 16,777,216 colors (24-bit true color)

This era is known for its pivotal role in the video game industry's leap from 2D to 3D computer graphics, as well as the shift in home console games from being stored on ROM cartridges to optical discs. This was also the first generation to feature internet connectivity: some systems had additional hardware which provided connectivity to an existing device, like the Sega Net Link for the Sega Saturn. The Apple Pippin, a commercial flop, was the first system to feature on-board internet capabilities.

For handhelds, this era was characterized by significant fragmentation, because the first handheld of the generation, the Sega Nomad, had a lifespan of just two years, and the Nintendo Virtual Boy had a lifespan of less than one. Both of them were discontinued before the other handhelds made their debut. The Neo Geo Pocket was released on October 28, 1998, but was dropped by SNK in favor of the fully backward compatible Neo Geo Pocket Color just a year later. Nintendo's Game Boy Color (1998) was the most successful handheld by a large margin. There were also two minor updates of the original Game Boy: the Game Boy Light (released in Japan only) and the Game Boy Pocket.

There was considerable time overlap between this generation and the next, the sixth generation of consoles, which began with the launch of the Dreamcast on November 27, 1998. The fifth generation ended with the discontinuation of the PlayStation (specifically its re-engineered form, the "PSOne") on March 23, 2006, a year after the launch of the seventh generation.

== History ==
=== Transition to 3D ===
The 32-bit/64-bit era is most noted for the rise of fully 3D polygon games. While there were games prior that had used three-dimensional polygon environments, such as Virtua Racing and Virtua Fighter in the arcades and Star Fox on the Super NES, it was in this era that many game designers began to move traditionally 2D and pseudo-3D genres into 3D on video game consoles. Early efforts from then-industry leaders Sega and Nintendo saw the introduction of the 32X and Super FX, which provided rudimentary 3D capabilities to the 16-bit Genesis and Super NES. Starting in 1996, 3D video games began to take off with releases such as Virtua Fighter 2 on the Saturn, Tomb Raider on the PlayStation and Saturn, Tekken 2 and Crash Bandicoot on the PlayStation, and Super Mario 64 on the Nintendo 64. Their 3D environments were widely marketed and they steered the industry's focus away from side-scrolling and rail-style titles, as well as opening doors to more complex games and genres. 3D became the main focus in this era as well as a slow decline of cartridges in favor of CDs, due to the ability to produce games less expensively and the media's high storage capabilities.

=== CD vs cartridge ===
After allowing Sony to develop a CD-based prototype console for them and a similar failed partnership with Philips, Nintendo decided to make the Nintendo 64 a cartridge-based system like its predecessors. Publicly, Nintendo defended this decision on the grounds that it would give games shorter load times than a compact disc (and would decrease piracy due to a certain chip in the ROM cartridge). However, it also had the dubious benefit of allowing Nintendo to charge higher licensing fees, as cartridge production was considerably more expensive than CD production. Many third-party developers like EA Sports viewed this as an underhanded attempt to raise more money for Nintendo and many of them became more reluctant to release games on the N64.

Nintendo's decision to use a cartridge based system sparked a debate in the video game magazines as to which was better. The chief advantages of the CD-ROM format were (1) larger storage capacity, allowing for a much greater amount of game content; (2) considerably lower manufacturing costs, making them much less risky for game publishers; (3) lower retail prices due to the reduced need to compensate for manufacturing costs; and (4) shorter production times, which greatly reduced the need for publishers to predict the demand for a game. Its disadvantages compared to cartridge were (1) considerable load times; (2) their inability to load data "on the fly", making them reliant on the console RAM; and (3) the greater manufacturing costs of CD-ROM drives compared to cartridge slots, resulting in generally higher retail prices for CD-based consoles. A Nintendo Power ad placed a Space Shuttle (representing cartridges) next to a snail (representing a CD), as an analogy for their respective speeds, stating that "the future doesn't belong to snails".

Almost every other contemporary system used the new CD-ROM technology. Consequent to the storage and cost advantages of the CD-ROM format, many game developers shifted their support away from the Nintendo 64 to the PlayStation. One of the most influential game franchises to change consoles during this era was the Final Fantasy series, beginning with Final Fantasy VII, which was developed for the PlayStation instead of the N64 due to storage capacity issues; prior Final Fantasy games had all been published on Nintendo consoles – either the NES or Super NES, with the only other entries being on the Wonderswan, or computers like the MSX.

=== Overview ===
The fifth generation was characterized by an unusually high number of console formats. More competing consoles comprised this generation than any other since the video game crash of 1983, leading video game magazines of the time to frequently predict a second crash.

==== Major consoles ====
The 3DO Interactive Multiplayer was one of the earliest fifth generation consoles and was released in October 1993. Despite having massive third-party support and an unprecedented amount of hype for a first-time entrant into the industry, it had early difficulties due to software development delays and its high price. For its initial release, the 3DO had a $700 retail price tag and only a single available game ready for market. The 3DO would be discontinued only three years later. While generally regarded as a failed system, the 3DO was this generation's fourth best-selling console in a crowded field with sales of 2 million units.

The Sega Saturn was Sega's entry into the stand-alone 32-bit console market. It was released in Japan simultaneously with the 32X in November 1994, although it would not have a North American release until six months later. It became Sega's most successful console in Japan. In America and Europe however, a disastrous launch and an MSRP of $399 compared to the PlayStation's $299 caused it to be a commercial failure, selling far fewer units than the Master System and Mega Drive/Genesis before it.

The PlayStation, released in early December 1994, was the most successful console of this generation. With attention given by third-party developers and a more mature marketing campaign aimed at the 20–30 age group enabling it to achieve market dominance, it became the first home console to ship 100 million units worldwide.

The Nintendo 64, originally announced as the "Ultra 64", was released in 1996. The system's delays and use of the expensive cartridge format made it an unpopular platform among third-party developers. Several popular first-party titles allowed the Nintendo 64 to maintain strong sales in the United States, but it remained a distant second to the PlayStation.

==== Other consoles ====
The Amiga CD32 was released in September 1993 and sold in Europe, Australia, Canada and Brazil. It was never released in the United States due to Commodore's bankruptcy and court-ordered import restrictions. Despite promising initial sales, the console was hampered by poor software quality with many titles being simply re-releases of older games. Production of the Amiga CD32 was discontinued after only eight months.

The Atari Jaguar was released in November 1993 and was marketed as the world's first 64-bit system. However, sales at launch were well below the incumbent fourth generation consoles, and a small games library rooted in a shortage of third-party support made it impossible for the Jaguar to catch up, selling below 250,000 units. The system's 64-bit nature was also questioned by many. Its only add-on, the Jaguar CD, was released in 1995 and was produced in limited quantities due to the low install base of the system. The 32-bit Atari Panther, set to be released in 1991, was canceled due to unexpectedly rapid progress in developing the Jaguar.

The Sega 32X, an add-on console produced by Sega for the Genesis, was launched in November 1994. The Sega Neptune, a standalone version of the 32X, was announced but ultimately canceled. Sega failed to deliver a steady flow of games for the 32X platform. With customers anticipating the PlayStation on the horizon, and with Sega's more technically advanced Saturn already competing on the market in Japan, sales of the 32X were poor.

NEC, creator of the TurboGrafx-16 of the previous generation, entered the market with the PC-FX in late December 1994. The system had a 32-bit processor, 16-bit stereo sound, and video capability. Despite its impressive specifications, it did not have a polygon processor and was marketed as a platform for 2D and full motion video games. The PC-FX game library was criticized for being low in quality, and having titles that relied more on animation than gameplay. Due to low expected sales, it was never released outside of Japan.

In 1995, Nintendo released the Virtual Boy, a supposedly portable system capable of displaying true 3D graphics, albeit in monochromatic red and black. Despite being marketed as a portable system, it is not actually portable in practice due to the lack of a head strap. Also, because of the nature of its display, the system reportedly caused headaches and eye strain. It was discontinued within a year, with fewer than 25 games being released for it. Although it sold over 750,000 units, Nintendo felt that it was a failure compared to consoles such as the Super Nintendo, which sold over 20 million.

=== Fifth generation hits its stride ===
By the end of the 1995 Christmas shopping season, the fifth generation had come down to a struggle between the Sony PlayStation, Sega Saturn, and the upcoming Nintendo 64. The Amiga CD32 had already been discontinued; the Jaguar, 32X, 3D0, and Virtual Boy were still on the market but were considered a lost cause by industry analysts; the Neo Geo CD had proven to appeal only to a niche market; and industry analysts had already determined that the yet-to-launch Apple Bandai Pippin was too expensive to make any impact in the market. Moreover, even the leading fifth generation consoles were still facing sluggish sales. Combined sales for the PlayStation, Saturn, and 3DO barely topped 1 million units for the Christmas shopping season, as compared to combined sales of 4 million for the Sega Genesis and Super NES. Focus groups showed that most children under 12 years old were equally happy playing on fourth generation consoles as they were playing on fifth generation consoles, making the fourth generation consoles more appealing to adults buying gifts for children, since they were cheaper. Industry analysts began putting forth the possibility that the fifth generation of consoles would never overtake the fourth generation in sales, and become superseded by a new generation of DVD player consoles before they could achieve mass acceptance.

1996 saw the fifth generation's fortunes finally turn around. With the Saturn, PlayStation, and Nintendo 64 all showing dramatic increases in sales over the previous year, they claimed a combined 40% of the retail market for hardware and software, putting them in position to finally overtake the fourth generation consoles in 1997.

The Sega Saturn suffered from poor marketing and comparatively limited third-party support outside Japan. Sega's decision to use dual processors was roundly criticized, as this made it difficult to efficiently develop for the console. Sega was also hurt by the Saturn's surprise four-month-early U.S. launch; third-party developers, who had been planning for the originally scheduled launch, could not provide launch titles and were angered by the move. Retailers were caught unprepared, resulting in distribution problems; some retailers, such as the now defunct KB Toys, were so furious that they refused to stock the Saturn thereafter.

Due to numerous delays, the Nintendo 64 was released one year later than its competitors. By the time it was finally launched in 1996, the PlayStation had already established its dominance, the Saturn was starting to struggle, and the 3DO and Jaguar had been discontinued. Its use of cartridge media rather than compact discs alienated some developers and publishers due to the space limits, the relatively high cost involved, and a considerably longer production time. In addition, the initially high suggested retail price of the console may have driven potential customers away, and some early adopters of the system who had paid the initial price may have been angered by Nintendo's decision to cut the price of the system by $50 six months after its release. However, the Nintendo 64 turned out to be a commercial success, particularly in the United States, where it sold 20.63 million units, nearly two thirds of its worldwide sales of 32.93 million units. It was also home to highly successful games such as Star Fox 64, Mario Kart 64, The Legend of Zelda: Ocarina of Time, The Legend of Zelda: Majora's Mask, Super Mario 64, GoldenEye 007, Banjo-Kazooie, and Super Smash Bros. While Nintendo 64 sold far more units than the Sega Saturn, Atari Jaguar, and 3DO combined, it posed no challenge to the PlayStation's lead in the market.

By 1997, 40% to 60% of American homes played on video game consoles. 30% to 40% of these homes owned a console, while an additional 10% to 20% rented or shared a console.

=== Changes in the industry ===
After the fifth generation console wars came to a stop, several companies saw their outlooks change drastically.

==== Atari ====
Atari Corporation, which was not able to recover its losses, ended up merging into JTS Corporation in 1996. This caused the Atari name to virtually disappear from the gaming market until 1998, when Hasbro Interactive purchased the Atari assets from JTS for $5 million.

On May 14, 1999, Hasbro Interactive announced that all rights to the Atari Jaguar were released into the public domain, thus declaring the platform open; this allowed anyone to freely create and publish games for the Jaguar without endorsement or licensing from Hasbro Interactive. Since then, homebrew developers began to release uncompleted Jaguar games as well as several brand new titles to satisfy the system's cult following.

==== Sega ====
Sega's loss of consumer confidence (coupled with its previous console failures), along with their financial difficulties, set the company up for a similar fate in the next round of console wars.

== Home systems ==
=== Comparison ===
Comparison of fifth-generation video game home consoles
Name		3DO Interactive Multiplayer	Sega Saturn	PlayStation	Nintendo 64
Logo					
Manufacturer		Panasonic, Sanyo, GoldStar, Creative	Sega	Sony	Nintendo
Developer		The 3DO Company	Sega	Sony Computer Entertainment	Nintendo
Image(s)					
Image(s)		Top: Panasonic FZ-1 R·E·A·L Bottom: GoldStar GDO-101M	Top: Japanese Saturn Model 1 and controller Bottom: North American Saturn Model 1 and updated controller	Top: Original PlayStation with DualShock controller Bottom: Revised PSOne with DualShock controller	Top: Nintendo 64 with controller and game cartridge Bottom: Nintendo 64 with 64DD peripheral attached
Release date		NA: October 4, 1993; JP: March 20, 1994; EU: June 11, 1994	JP: November 22, 1994; NA: May 11, 1995; EU/AU: July 8, 1995	JP: December 3, 1994; NA: September 9, 1995; EU: September 29, 1995; AU: November 15, 1995	JP: June 23, 1996; NA: September 29, 1996; EU: March 1, 1997; AU: March 1, 1997
Launch price	US$	US$699.99 (equivalent to $1,560 in 2025)	US$399.99 (equivalent to $850 in 2025)	US$299.99 (equivalent to $630 in 2025)	US$199.99 (equivalent to $410 in 2025)
Launch price	GBP		£399.99 (equivalent to £820 in 2025)	£299(equivalent to £610 in 2025)	£249.99(equivalent to £490 in 2025
Launch price	A$				
Launch price	JP¥		¥44,800 (equivalent to ¥50,640 in 2024)	¥39,800 (equivalent to ¥44,990 in 2024)	
Media	Type	CD-ROM	CD-ROM; Cartridge (limited, Japan and Europe only)	CD-ROM	Game Pak cartridge; Proprietary magnetic disk (via 64DD)
Media	Regional lockout	Unrestricted	Region locked	Region locked	Region locked
Best-selling game		Gex, 1+ million	Virtua Fighter 2, 1.7 million	Gran Turismo, 10.85 million	Super Mario 64, 11.62 million
CPU		ARM60 (32‑bit RISC) @ 12.5 MHz (8.75 MIPS)	2× Hitachi SH-2 7604 (32‑bit RISC) @ 28.63 MHz); Hitachi SH-1 (32‑bit RISC) @ 20 MHz (12.5 MIPS); Motorola 68EC000 (16/32‑bit CISC) @ 11.3 MHz (1.9775 MIPS); SCU (32‑bit Saturn Control Unit)	LSI LR333x0 (labelled as the Sony CXD8530CQ on the package) (based on the MIPS R3051 core) @ 33.8688 MHz (30 MIPS); System control coprocessor (inside CPU)	NEC VR4300 (64‑bit RISC) @ 93.75 MHz (125 MIPS): 32-bit data coprocessor (64DD)
GPU		2× accelerated video co-processors; Math co-processor (inside CPU)	Sega VDP1 (32‑bit video display processor) @ 28.63 MHz (sprites, textures, polygons); Sega VDP2 (32‑bit video display processor) @ 28.63 MHz (backgrounds, scrolling); SCU DSP (inside SCU (32‑bit Saturn Control Unit))	Sony GPU; Vector math unit (in main CPU) @ 66 MIPS	Reality Co-Processor (64‑bit MIPS R4000 based, 128‑bit vector register processor) @ 62.5 MHz
Sound chip(s)		13 channel unnamed custom 20‑bit DSP embedded in the CLIO chip	Yamaha YMF292 SCSP; Yamaha FH1 DSP (inside Yamaha YMF292 SCSP 24‑bit, 128-step, 4 parallel instructions)	Sony SPU (sound processing unit)	Reality Signal Processor (DSP)
Memory		3 MB RAM: 2 MB DRAM; 1 MB VRAM	4.5 MB RAM: 2 MB SDRAM; 1.5 MB VRAM (512 KB sprite/texture cache, 512 KB frame buffers, 512 KB backgrounds); 1 MB DRAM (512 KB sound, 512 KB CD-ROM sub-system buffer data cache)	3587 KB RAM: 2 MB DRAM; 1026 KB VRAM (1 MB frame buffer, 2 KB texture cache, 64 bytes FIFO buffer); 512 KB sound RAM; 1 KB non-associative SRAM data cache	4 MB RDRAM (8 MB with Expansion Pak)
Video		Resolution: 320×200 to 384×288 (progressive), 320×480 to 768×576 (interlaced); Colors: 110,592 (384×288) on screen, out of 16,777,216 (24‑bit) palette; Polygons: 20,000/sec, flat shading, Gouraud shading; Sprites/textures: Scaling, rotation, texture mapping; Background: 1 bitmap plane	Resolution: 320×224 to 720×240 (progressive), 320×448 to 720×576 (interlaced); Colors: 172,800 (720×240) on screen, out of 16,777,216 (24‑bit) palette; Polygons: 140,000/sec (textured, lighting, Gouraud shading) to 500,000/sec (flat shading); Sprites/textures: 16,384/frame (32 bytes each, 512 KB memory), scaling, rotation, distortion, texture mapping; Backgrounds: 7 (3–6 tilemap planes, 1–4 bitmap planes), parallax scrolling, scaling, rotation	Resolution: 256×224 to 640×240 (progressive), 256×448 to 640×512 (interlaced); Colors: 153,600 (640×240) on screen, out of 16,777,216 (24‑bit) palette; Polygons: 90,000/sec (textured, lighting, Gouraud shading) to 360,000/sec (flat shading); Sprites/textures: 4,000/frame (bitmap objects), scaling, rotation, texture mapping; Background: 1 bitmap plane	Resolution: 320×200 to 720×288 (progressive), 320×400 to 720×576 (interlaced); Colors: 207,360 (720×288) on screen, out of 16,777,216 (24‑bit) palette; Polygons: 150,000/sec (textured, lighting, Gouraud shading) to 600,000/sec (flat shading), anti‑aliasing, Z-buffering; Sprites/textures: Scaling, rotation, texture mapping, mipmapping, texture filtering, bilinear filtering, trilinear filtering; Background: 1 bitmap plane
Audio		Stereo audio, with: 16‑bit sound; Optional Dolby Surround support; Streaming CD-DA audio (16‑bit PCM, 44.1 kHz sampling rate)	Stereo audio, with: 32 sound channels on SCSP; FM synthesis on all 32 SCSP channels; 16‑bit PCM audio with 44.1 kHz sampling rate on all 32 SCSP channels; 1 streaming CD-DA channel (16‑bit PCM, 44.1 kHz)	Stereo audio, with: 24 ADPCM channels on SPU; 16‑bit audio and 44.1 kHz sampling rate on all 24 ADPCM channels; 1 streaming CD-DA channel (16‑bit PCM, 44.1 kHz); Optional Dolby Surround support	Stereo audio, with: Variable number of channels; Capable of playing back different types of audio (including PCM, MP3, MIDI and tracker music); 16‑bit audio and 44.1 kHz sampling rate on all channels; Optional Dolby Surround support
Accessories (retail)		MPEG cards; FZ-EM256 save memory backup unit; Gamegun; Mouse	Arcade Stick; Saturn digital gamepad; 3D controller; Light guns; Multitap (up to 12 players); Keyboard; Sega NetLink (online modem and keyboard); Mouse; 1.44 MB 3.5" floppy disk drive; DirectLink (LAN); Memory card; MPEG cards; RAM expansion cartridges	PlayStation Multitap (up to 8 players); Fishing reel controllers (Bass Landing and Reel Fishing); Dual Analog Controller; DualShock; GunCon; Jogcon; Konami Justifier; NeGcon; PocketStation (Japan only); PlayStation Mouse; Analog Joystick; Dance pad; LCD screen (for PSone systems only); Memory card; Link Cable	Controller Pak; Memory Expansion Pak; Rumble Pak; Transfer Pak; Nintendo 64DD (Japan only); Nintendo 64 Mouse (Japan only); Voice Recognition Unit
Online services		None	NA: NetLink 28.8k modem; JP: SegaNet 14.4k modem	US: Lightspan Online Connection CD; JP: i-mode Mobile Phone Connection Cable	US: SharkWire Online 14.4k modem (unofficial); JP: Randnet (64DD only)

=== Other consoles ===
These consoles are either less notable, never saw a worldwide release, and/or sold particularly poorly, and are therefore listed as 'Other'.

Name		Atari Jaguar	32X	PC-FX	Virtual Boy
Logo					
Manufacturer		IBM	Sega	Hudson Soft	Nintendo
Developer		Atari	Sega	NEC	Nintendo
Image(s)					
Image(s)		Top: Atari Jaguar and controller Bottom: Atari Jaguar CD connected to the console and ProController	32X connected to a model 2 Genesis with Sega CD and controller	PC-FX and controller	Virtual Boy with controller
Release date		NA: November 23, 1993; EU: June 27, 1994; AU: August 1, 1994; JP: December 8, 1994	NA: November 21, 1994; EU: November 1994; JP: December 3, 1994	JP: December 23, 1994	JP: July 21, 1995; NA: August 14, 1995
Launch price	US$	US$249.99 (equivalent to $560 in 2025)	US$159.99 (equivalent to $350 in 2025)		US$179.95 (equivalent to $370 in 2025)
Launch price	GBP				
Launch price	A$		A$700 (equivalent to $1,460 in 2022)		
Launch price	JP¥		¥29.800 (equivalent to ¥30 in 2024)	¥49,800 (equivalent to ¥56,690 in 2024)	
Media	Type	ROM cartridge; CD-ROM (via Jaguar CD add-on)	ROM cartridge; CD-ROM (via Sega CD add-on)	CD-ROM	ROM cartridge
Media	Regional lockout	Unrestricted	Partial	None	Unrestricted
Best-selling game		Alien vs Predator, more than 50,000	Doom	—N/a	Mario's Tennis (US pack-in game)
CPU		"Tom" (32‑bit RISC) @ 26.59 MHz; "Jerry" (32‑bit RISC) @ 26.59 MHz; Motorola 68000 (16/32‑bit CISC) @ 13.3 MHz (2.3275 MIPS)	2× SH-2 32-bit RISC (23 MHz)	NEC V810 @ 21.475 MHz	NEC V810 @ 20 MHz
GPU		Tom chip: GPU, object processor, blitter; Jerry chip: DSP	Sega 32x VDP (Sega Custom LSI) @ 23 MHz; Yamaha YM7101 VDP (Video Display Processor); Sega CD Add-on: Sega ASIC coprocessor	HuC6270; HuC6271	Video Image Processor
Sound chip(s)		"Jerry" chip: DSP, 2× DAC (converts digital data to analog signals)	Pulse-code modulation; Yamaha YM2612; Yamaha VDP PSG (SN76496); Sega CD Add-on: Ricoh RF5c164	Hudson Soft HuC6230 SoundBox	VSU (Virtual Sound Unit) chip
Memory		2 MB FPM DRAM (4× 512 KB chips)	256 KB RAM: 256 KB VRAM; 64 KB main PSRAM; 64 KB video DRAM; 8 KB audio SRAM; Sega CD Add-on: 512 KB RAM; 256 KB VRAM; 64 KB ARAM; 16 KB cache; 8 KB Internal Back-up	2 MB	64 KB work PSRAM; 128 KB graphics DRAM; 128 KB VRAM
Video		Resolution: 320×220 to 360×220 (progressive), 320×440 to 720×440 (interlaced); Colors: 79,200 (360×220) on screen, out of 16,777,216 (24‑bit) palette; Polygons: 10,000/sec, flat shading, Gouraud shading support; Sprites/textures: 1,000/frame (blitter objects), scaling, rotation, texture mapping; Background: 1 bitmap plane	Resolution: 320×224; Colors: 32,768 (15-bit high color), 256–32,768 colors on screen, Polygons: 40,000 Texture Gouraud Shading polygons/sec, 50,000 texture mapping polygons/sec, 100,000 Gouraud Shading polygons/sec, 160,000 flat shading polygons/sec; Sprites: 80 on screen, 20 per scanline, 8×8 to 32×32 sizes, 16 colors per sprite, integer sprite zoom, sprite flipping; Tilemaps: 2 parallax scrolling planes with line & row scroll effects and tile flipping	Resolution: 256x240 to 341x240; Colors: 16.77 on screen; Sprites: 128 on screen, 32 per scanline, scaling, rotation, texture mapping, Motion JPEG compression @ 30fps; Tilemaps: 9 parallax scrolling planes with texture mapping	Stereoscopic LED display; Resolution: 384×224; Sprites: 8×8
Audio		Stereo audio, with: Number of channels dependent on software; Synthesis (wavetable synthesis, AM synthesis); 16‑bit PCM sampling	Stereo audio with: 10-bit PWM, surround sound; 6 FM synthesis channels/voices; 3 square wave channels/voices; Sine wave LFO; 1 PCM channel, 8-bit samples, 8 to 22 kHz sampling rate; Sega CD Add-on: 8 PCM channels (16-bit, 32 kHz); 1 streaming CD-DA channel (16-bit, 44.1 kHz)	16-Bit stereo audio with: two ADPCM Channels; six 5-Bit sample Channels	Virtual Sound Unit with: Five wave channels; One noise channel; 32 PCM samples
Accessories (retail)		Jaguar TeamTap; Jaguar Pro Controller; Jaguar MemoryTrack Cartridge; Jaguar JagLink Interface	Megadrive peripherals supported	FX BMP; PC-FX Mouse; PC-FX SCSI Adapter	Virtual Boy AC Adapter; Virtual Boy Stereo Headphones
Online services		Jaguar Voice/Data Communicator 19.2k modem (no mass production)	JP: Sega Meganet; US: Sega Channel	None	None

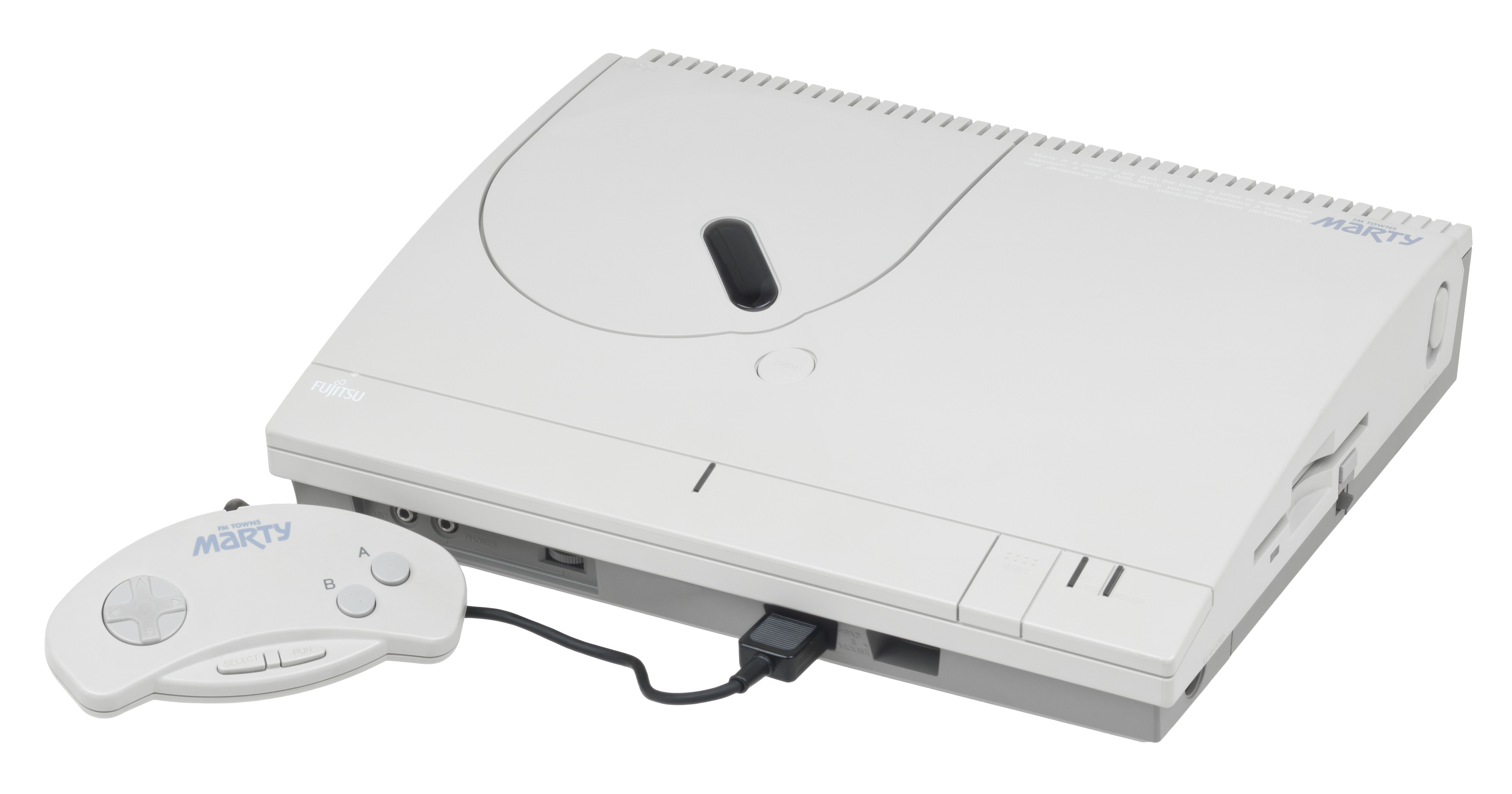
FM Towns Marty, created by Fujitsu. Released on February 20, 1993.

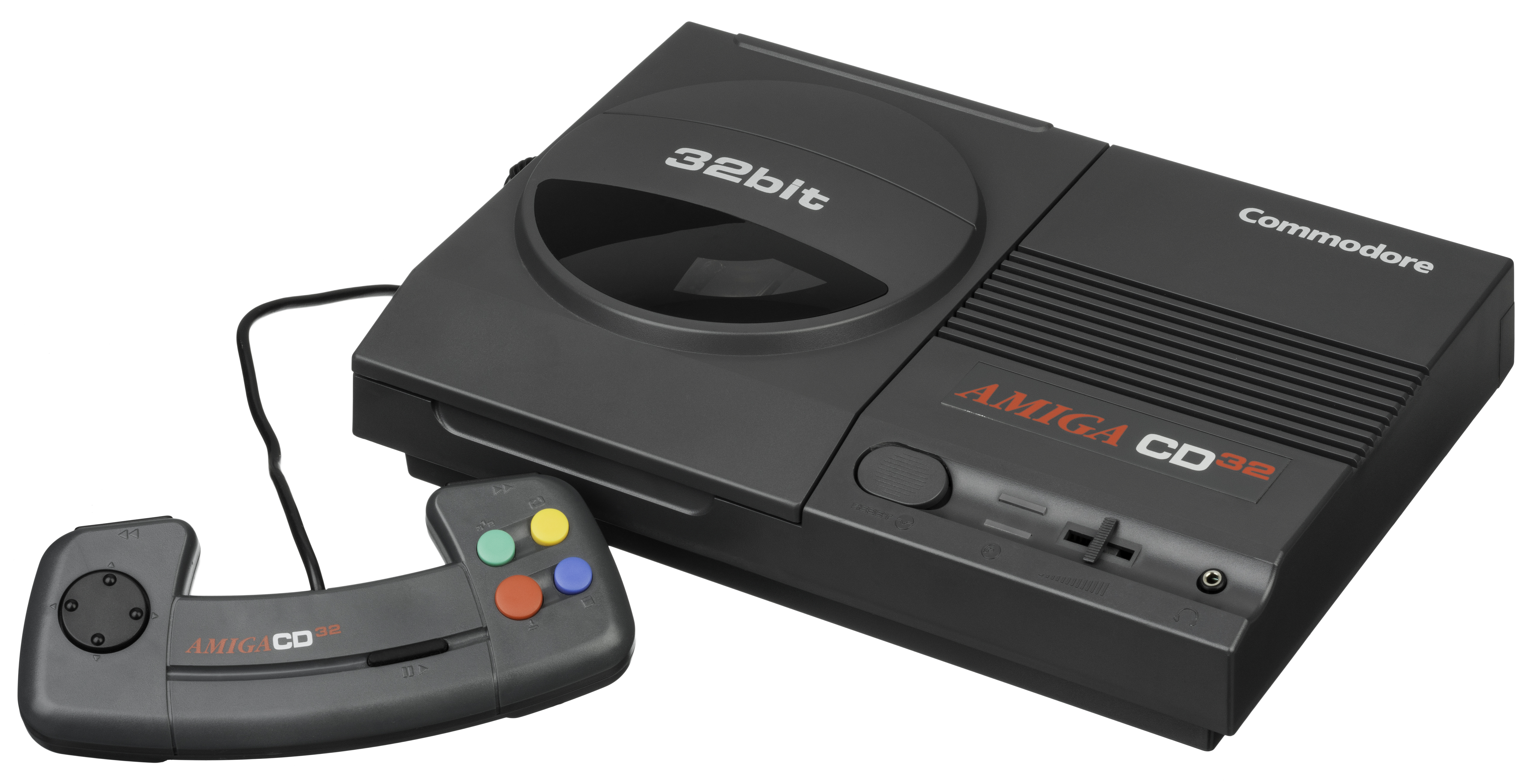
Amiga CD32, created by Commodore. Released on September 17, 1993.

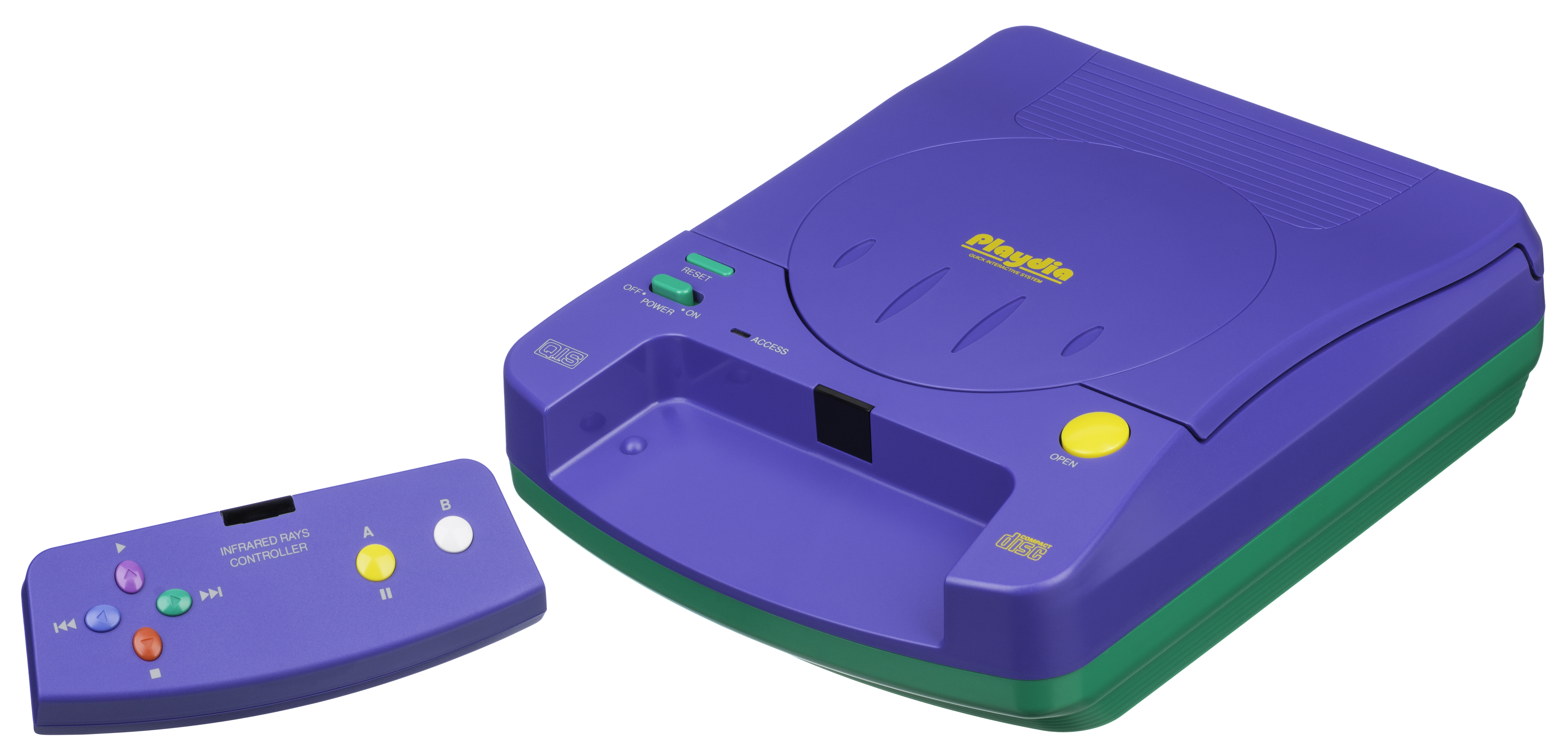
Playdia, created by Bandai. A console consisting of simple multiple choice games. Released in Japan on September 23, 1994.

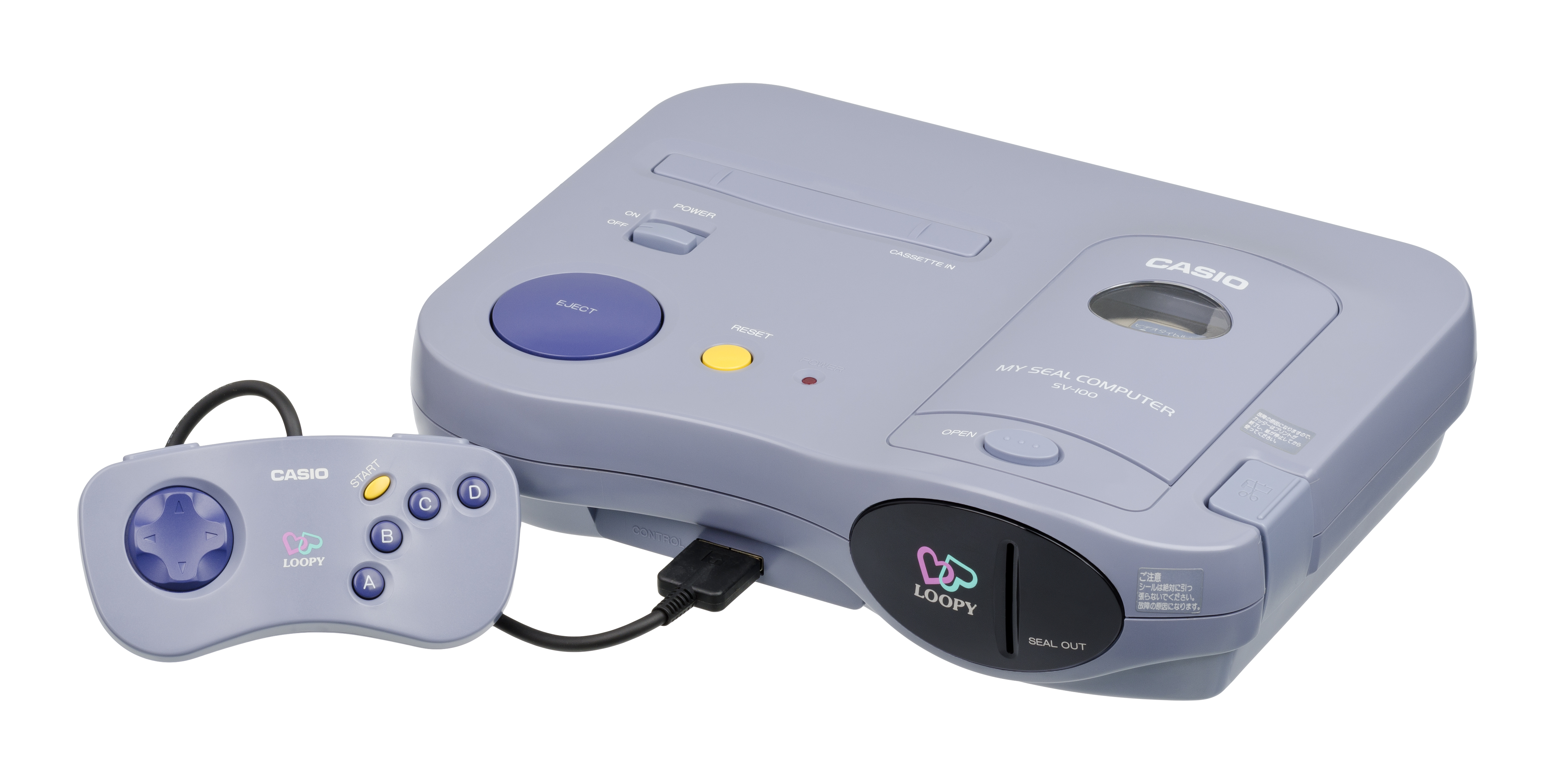
Casio Loopy, created by Casio. Released in October 1995 in Japan, targeted at female gamers.

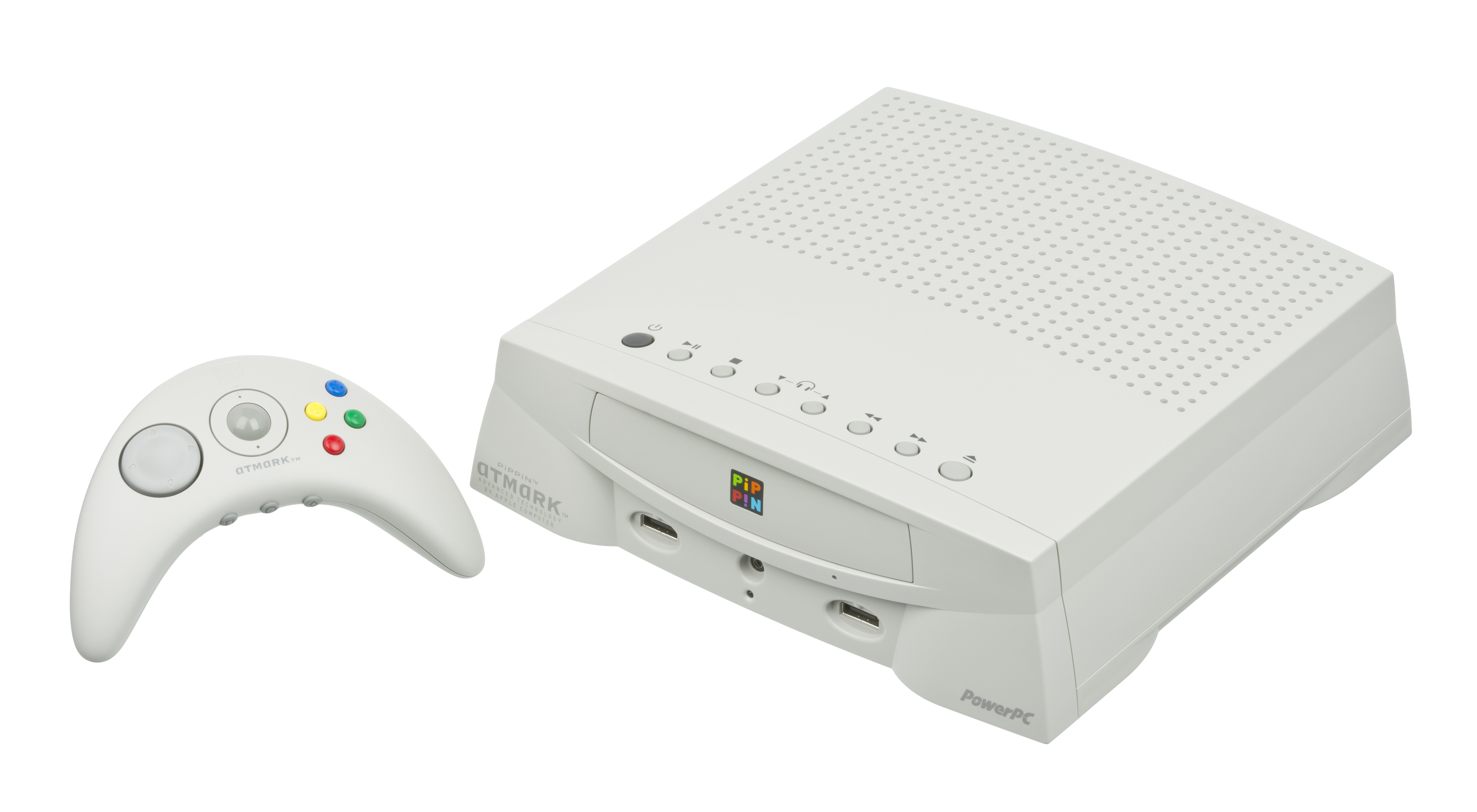
Apple Bandai Pippin, created by Apple and Bandai. Released in 1996.

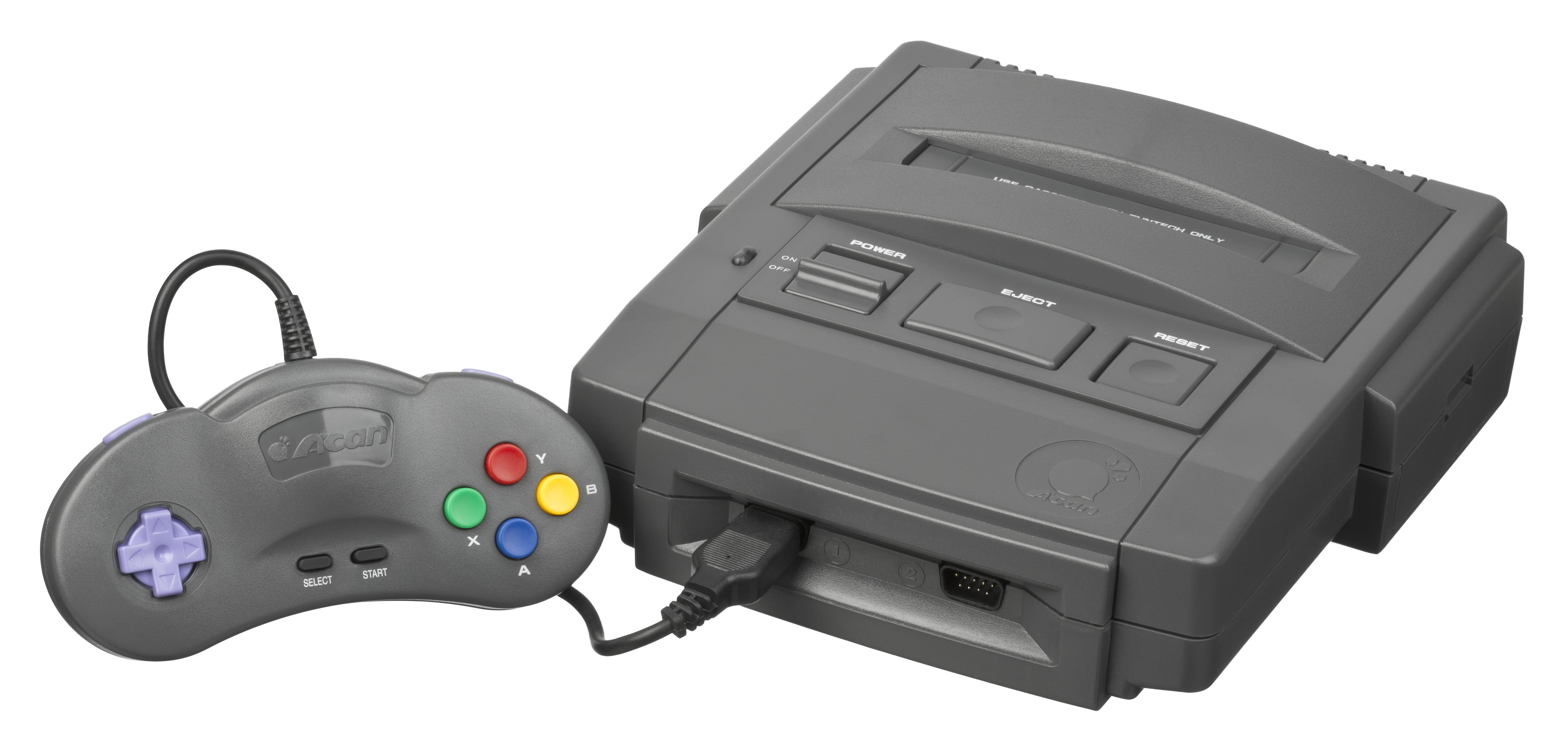
Super A'Can, manufactured by Funtech, a Taiwanese home video game console. Released on 25 October 1995 only in Taiwan.

Capcom CPS Changer, created by Capcom. Japan-only mail-order home version of the CP System (CPS-1) arcade hardware. Released in late 1994.

=== Worldwide sales standings ===
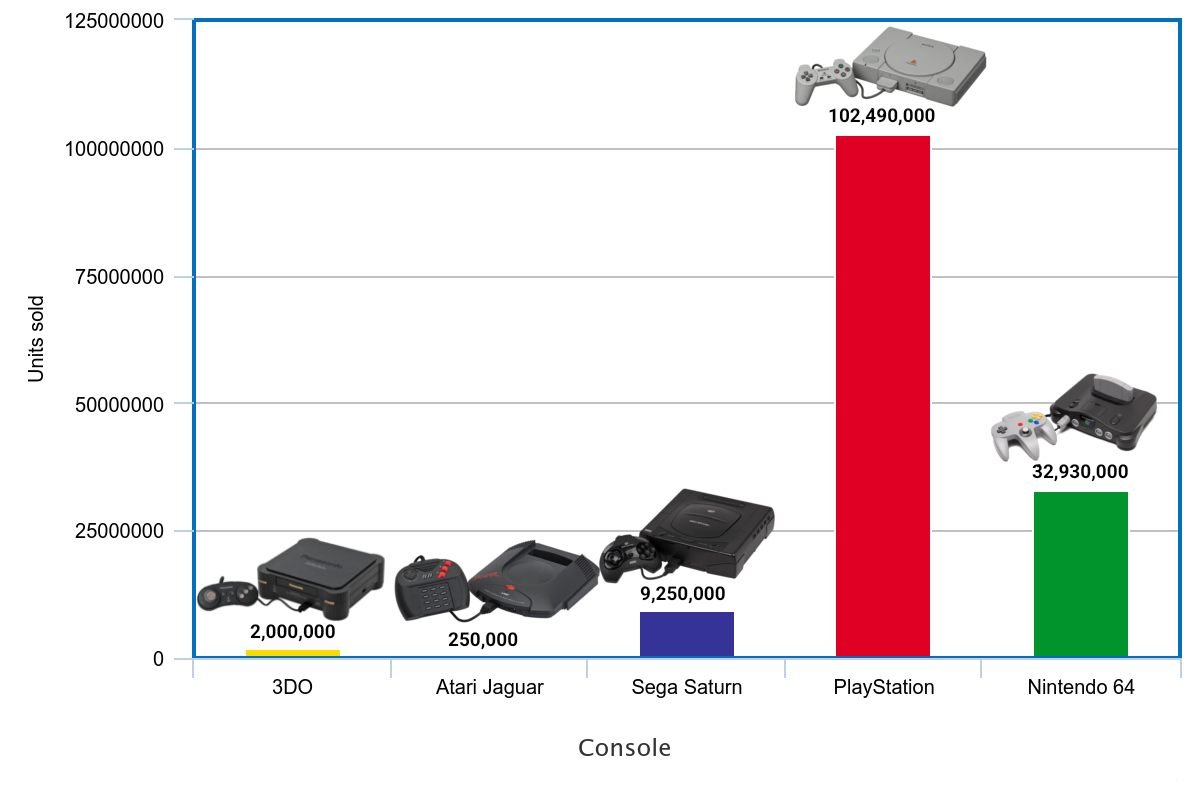
Bar chart showing the sales of the main 5th generation consoles

System	Units sold
PlayStation	102.49 million shipped (74.34 million PlayStation, 28.15 million PSone) (as of March 31, 2005)
Nintendo 64	32.93 million (as of March 31, 2005)
Sega Saturn	9.26 million
3DO	2 million
32X	800,000
Virtual Boy	770,000
PC-FX	400,000
Atari Jaguar	250,000 (as of May 15, 2007)
Amiga CD32	100,000
FM Towns Marty	45,000 (as of December 31, 1993)
Apple Bandai Pippin	42,000 (as of May 4, 2007)
Super A'Can	~50,000
Capcom CPS Changer	~1,000

From 1996 to 1999 (when the PlayStation, N64 and Saturn were the major 5th-generation consoles still on the market) Sony managed a 47% market share of the worldwide market, followed by Nintendo with 28% (with a percentage of that figure from the 16‑bit Super NES), while Sega was third with 23% (with a percentage of that from the Dreamcast).

Production of the Sega Saturn was discontinued in 1998. Its demise was accelerated by rumors that work on its successor was underway; these rumors hurt the systems' sales in the west as early as 1997. The N64 was succeeded by the GameCube in 2001, but continued its production until 2004; however, PlayStation production was not ceased as it was redesigned as the PSone, further extending the life of the console around the release of the follow-up PlayStation 2. The PlayStation console production was discontinued in 2006, the same year that the PlayStation 3 was released in Japan and North America.

== Handheld systems ==
=== Handheld comparison ===
Name		Genesis Nomad	Game Boy Color	Neo Geo Pocket	Neo Geo Pocket Color
Logo					
Manufacturer		Sega	Nintendo	SNK	
Console					
Release dates		NA: October 1995	JP: October 21, 1998; NA: November 18, 1998; EU: November 23, 1998; AU: November 27, 1998	JP: October 28, 1998	JP: March 16, 1999; NA: August 6, 1999; EU: October 1, 1999
Launch price	US$	US$180 (equivalent to $380 in 2025)	US$79.95 (equivalent to $160 in 2025)		US$69.95 (equivalent to $140 in 2025)
Launch price	GBP			£59.99 (equivalent to £120 in 2025)	
Launch price	A$				
Launch price	JP¥			¥7,800 (equivalent to ¥8,600 in 2024)	
Discontinued		NA: 1999	WW: March 23, 2003	JP: 1999	NA: June 13, 2000; EU: June 13, 2000; JP: October 22, 2001
Media	Type	ROM cartridge	Game Boy Game Pak; Game Boy Color Game Pak	ROM cartridge	
Media	Regional lockout	Region locked	Unrestricted	Unrestricted	Unrestricted
Media	Backward compatibility	Sega Genesis	Game Boy	—N/a	Neo Geo Pocket
Best-selling game		Sonic the Hedgehog, 15 million (Note: Shared with Sega Genesis)	Pokémon Gold and Silver, 23 million	Unknown	
CPU		Motorola 68000 @ 7.6 MHz	Sharp SM83 @ 4.2 / 8.4 MHz	Toshiba TLCS900H @ 6 MHz	
Memory		64 KB RAM; 64 KB video RAM; 8 KB audio RAM; 20 KB ROM	32 KB RAM; 16 KB video RAM; 2 KB ROM; 127 B High RAM	12 KB RAM; 4 KB audio RAM; 64 KB ROM	
Display	Type	3.25-inch backlit liquid-crystal display (LCD)	2.3-inch (diagonal) TFT LCD	2.6-inch (diagonal) LCD	2.6-inch TFT LCD
Display	Color	64 to 75 on screen, 512 color palette	32,768, up to 56 simultaneously	Monochromatic	4,096, up to 146 simultaneously
Audio		Yamaha YM2612 sound chip	Nintendo Audio Processing Unit generating: Two square wave channels; One waveform channel; One noise channel	Zilog Z80 @ 3 MHz controlling SN76489 sound chip generating: Three square wave channels; One noise channel; Dual 8-bit DACs	
Resolutions		384 × 224	160 × 144	160 × 152	
Battery life		4 hours	Up to 10 hours	40 hours	
Units sold		1 million	118.69 million (including Game Boy)		2 million

=== Other handhelds ===
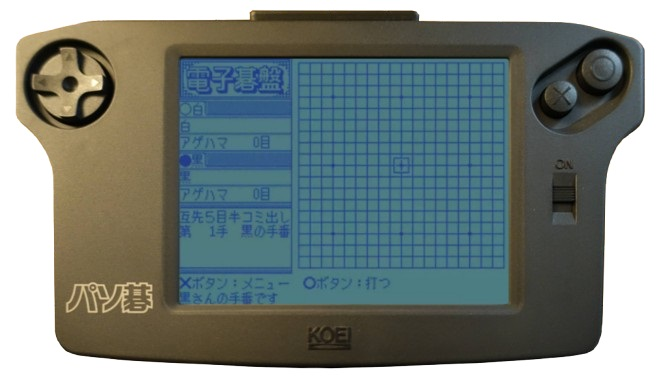
PasoGo by Koei, a console with a library dedicated to the game of Go. Released in Japan in 1996.

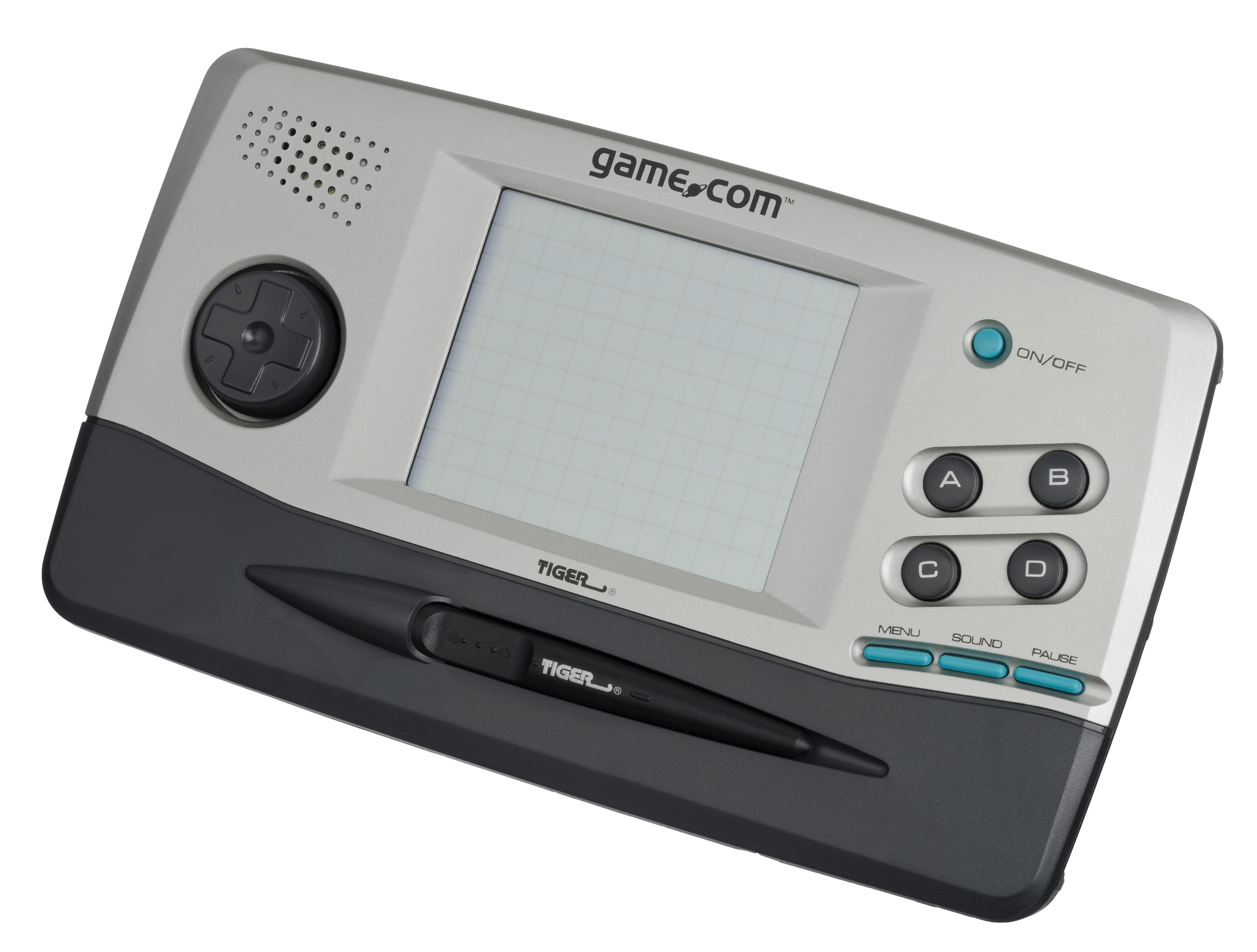
Game.com.
Released in 1997.

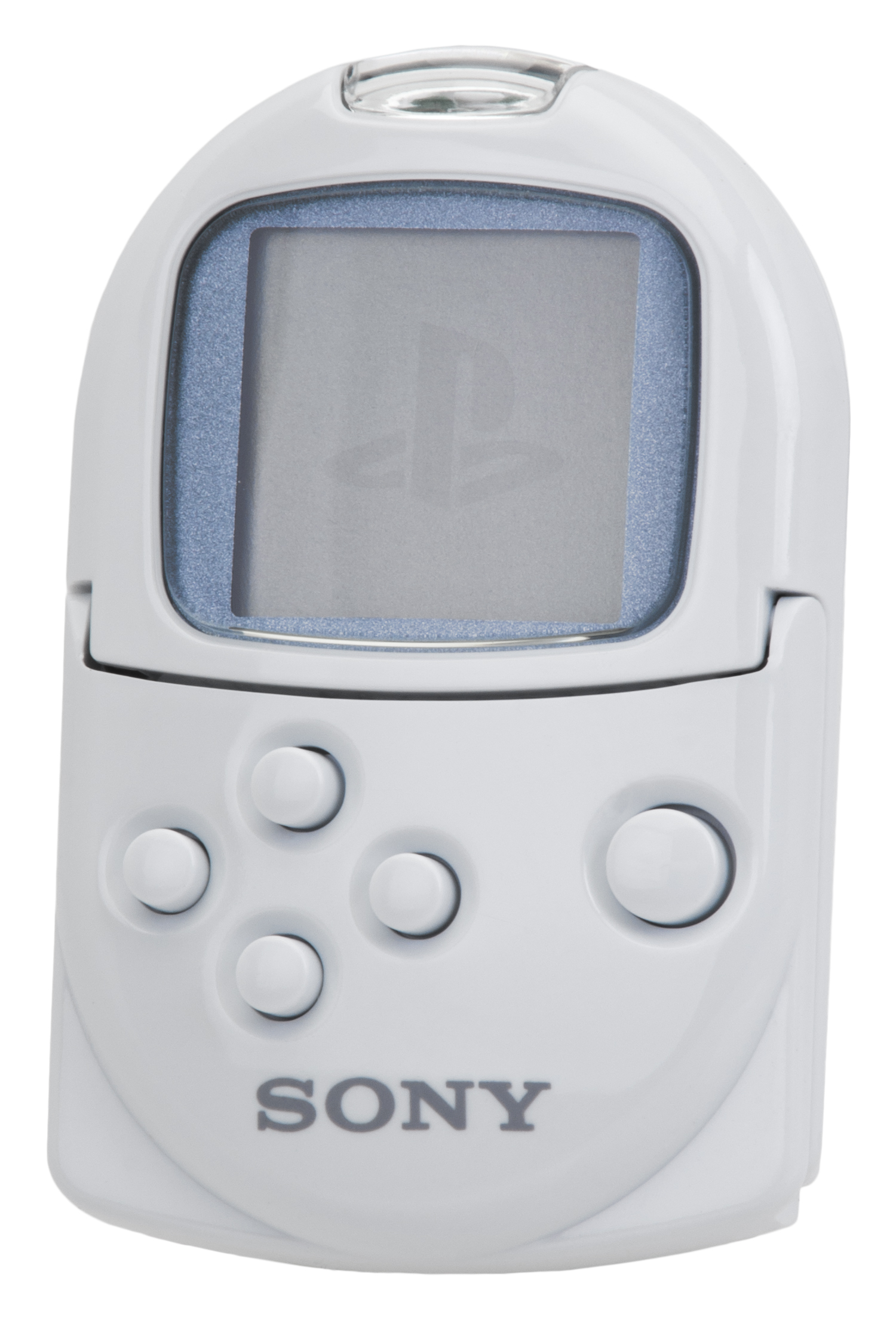
PocketStation.
Released in 1999 in Japan only.

== Milestone titles ==
- Castlevania: Symphony of the Night (PlayStation, Saturn) by Konami Computer Entertainment Tokyo and Konami is considered one of the best PlayStation games, and a strong argument for the relevance of 2D games in an increasingly 3D market. The game is also credited with starting the Metroidvania genre, along with Super Metroid.
- Crash Bandicoot (PlayStation) by Naughty Dog and Sony Computer Entertainment (SCE) would go on to become Sony's de facto mascot along with Nintendo's Mario and Sega's Sonic the Hedgehog. The game featured a marsupial bandicoot named Crash and would prove to be one of the PlayStation's most successful titles.
- Dragon Warrior VII (PlayStation) by Heartbeat, ArtePiazza, and Enix was the number one best-selling title on the PlayStation in Japan, released in 2000. The game was the first main installment of Japan's national RPG series released in 5 years.
- Final Fantasy VII (PlayStation, PC) by Square Product Development Division 1 and Square is one of the PlayStation's most acclaimed and popular titles, selling around 10 million copies worldwide. It was the first game in the Final Fantasy series to make use of full motion videos (FMVs) and is credited with allowing console role-playing games to gain mass-market appeal outside of Japan. Final Fantasy became one of the biggest franchises in video gaming, with Final Fantasy VII in particular having several spin-offs known as Compilation of Final Fantasy VII.
- GoldenEye 007 (Nintendo 64) by Rare and Nintendo is a critically acclaimed game that helped make the first-person shooter a potential popular genre on consoles. The game has subsequently become credited alongside Shiny Entertainment's MDK for pioneering and popularising the now-standard inclusion of scoped sniper rifles in video games.
- The Legend of Zelda: Ocarina of Time (Nintendo 64) by Nintendo EAD and Nintendo is one of the most critically acclaimed games of all time and often listed as one of the greatest video games of all time.
- Nights into Dreams (Saturn) by Sonic Team and Sega was bundled with the Saturn's analog controller, which was almost essential to the gameplay. With its innovative gameplay and graphics, Nights, an exclusive title, aided in the selling of a number of Saturns.
- Panzer Dragoon Saga (Saturn) by Team Andromeda and Sega is the highest-rated Saturn title on Game Rankings with a score of 92.87%, and has been cited as one of the greatest games ever made.
- Pokémon Red and Blue (Game Boy) by Game Freak and Nintendo was a critical and financial success when the games debuted on the Game Boy and putting another Nintendo franchise on the map. By the end of this console generation, the games sold about 31 million units worldwide.
- Pokémon Gold and Silver (Game Boy Color) also developed by Game Freak and Nintendo garnered critical acclaim from various gaming critics, are considered by many to be the best games in the Pokémon franchise.
- Quake (PC, Saturn, Nintendo 64) by id Software built upon the technology and gameplay of its predecessor Doom, and its engine offered full real-time 3D rendering and had early support for 3D acceleration through OpenGL, in addition to various multiplayer option compared to its predecessor. The game was critically acclaimed upon release and is considered one of the best video games of all time.
- Rayman (Jaguar, PlayStation, Saturn, PC) by Ubisoft was highly praised for its animated 2D graphics, atmosphere, soundtrack, and high difficulty, and was the number one best-selling title on the PlayStation in the UK, released in 1995. The game has since spawned over 45 additional entries in the series.
- Resident Evil (PlayStation, Saturn) by Capcom received critical acclaim and is credited for popularizing the survival horror genre.
- Sega Rally Championship (Arcade, Saturn, PC) by Sega AM5 and Sega was the first rally racing game. It broke new ground by incorporating different surfaces with different friction properties, and has been cited as one of the greatest racing games ever made.
- Star Fox 64 (Nintendo 64) by Nintendo EAD and Nintendo is the first Nintendo 64 game to use the Nintendo 64 Rumble Pak, which was bundled with the game. It was a success and sold 3 million copies worldwide.
- Super Mario 64 (Nintendo 64) by Nintendo Entertainment Analysis & Development (Nintendo EAD) and Nintendo is considered to be one of the greatest games of all time, particularly for its use of a dynamic camera system, the implementation of its 360-degree analog control, and open world design. Super Mario 64 is one of the best selling home console games of the era, selling 11.62 million copies worldwide.
- Tekken 3 (arcade, PlayStation) by Namco is considered not only to be the greatest installment of the Tekken series, but remains as one of the greatest fighting games of all time according to PlayStation Magazine. It has a Metacritic score of 96, and is the 12th highest rated game ever according to GameRankings. Its predecessor achieved similar feats until its succession, and the first game in the franchise was the first PlayStation game to sell over a million units.
- Tomb Raider (PlayStation, Saturn, PC) by Core Design and Eidos Interactive popularized many elements seen in later video games and spawned several very successful sequels. The main character, Lara Croft, was named the most recognizable female video game character by Guinness World Records.
- Tony Hawk's Pro Skater 2 (Nintendo 64, PlayStation, PC) by Neversoft and Activision garnered widespread critical acclaim and has been cited as one of the greatest games ever made.
- Virtua Cop (Arcade, Saturn, PC) by Sega AM2 and Sega introduced the use of 3D polygons to the light-gun shooter genre, paving the way for future light gun shooters like Namco's Time Crisis and Sega's The House of the Dead, and was a major influence on GoldenEye 007.
- Virtua Fighter (Arcade, Saturn, PC) by Sega AM2 and Sega created the 3D fighting game genre. The console port, which was nearly identical to the arcade game, sold at a nearly 1:1 ratio with the Saturn hardware at launch. The original arcade version also had a major influence on the PlayStation becoming a 3D-focused console.
- Virtua Fighter 2 (Arcade, Saturn, PC) by Sega AM2 and Sega was heralded at the time as "the ultimate arcade translation" and "the best fighting game ever". The title remains the highest selling Saturn game in Japan with 1.7 million copies.
- Wipeout (PlayStation, PC, Saturn) by Psygnosis received critical and financial success for its futuristic setting, weapons designed to both stall and destroy opponents and its marketing campaign designed by Keith Hopwood and The Designers Republic, in addition to unique licensed music from established electronica acts for PAL versions. The game has been described as being synonymous with Sony's debut gaming hardware and as an early showcase for 3D graphics in console gaming.

== See also ==
- 1990s in video games
