= Sega Saturn =

Home video game console

- Western (top) and Eastern (bottom) logos

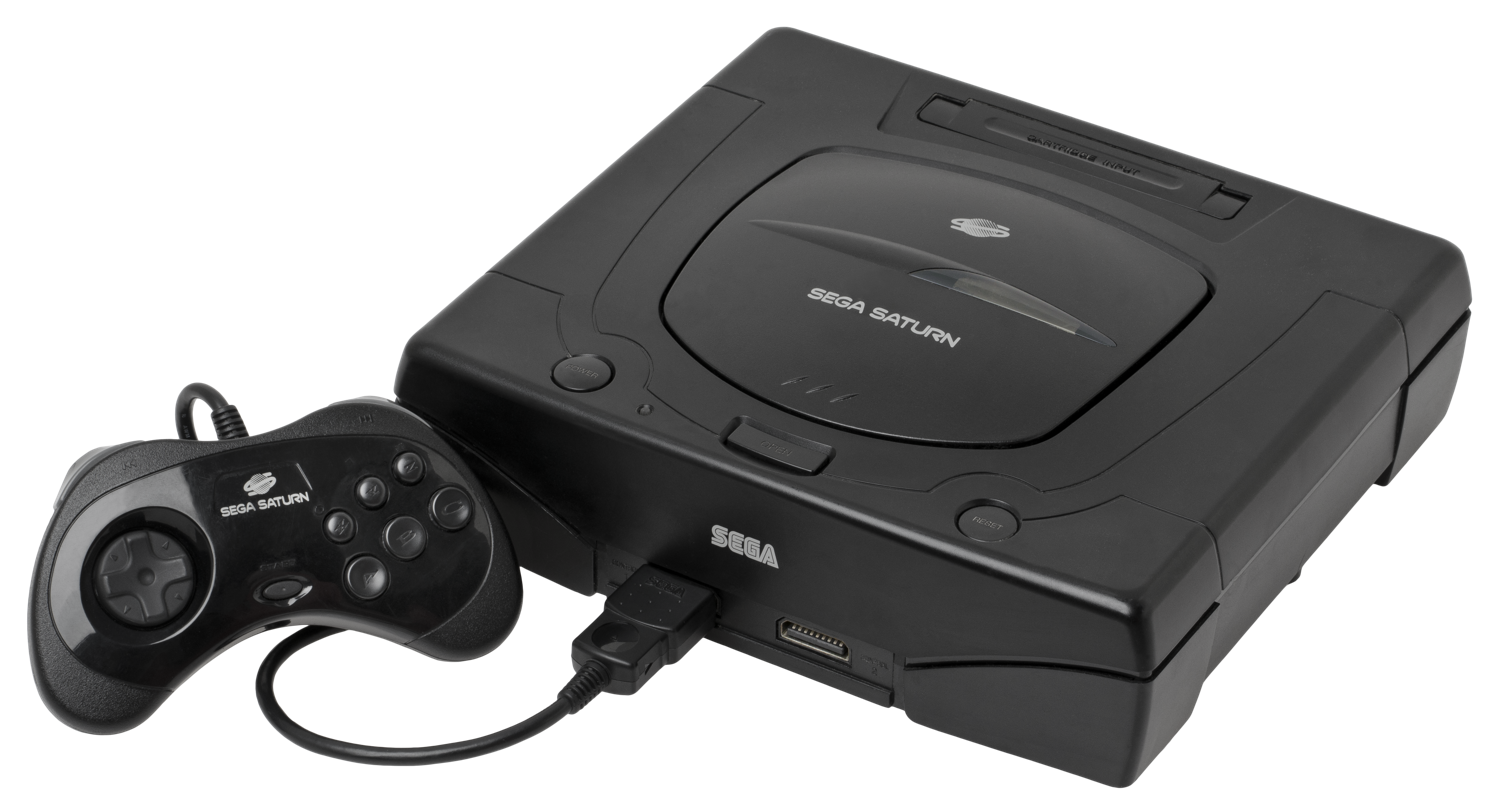
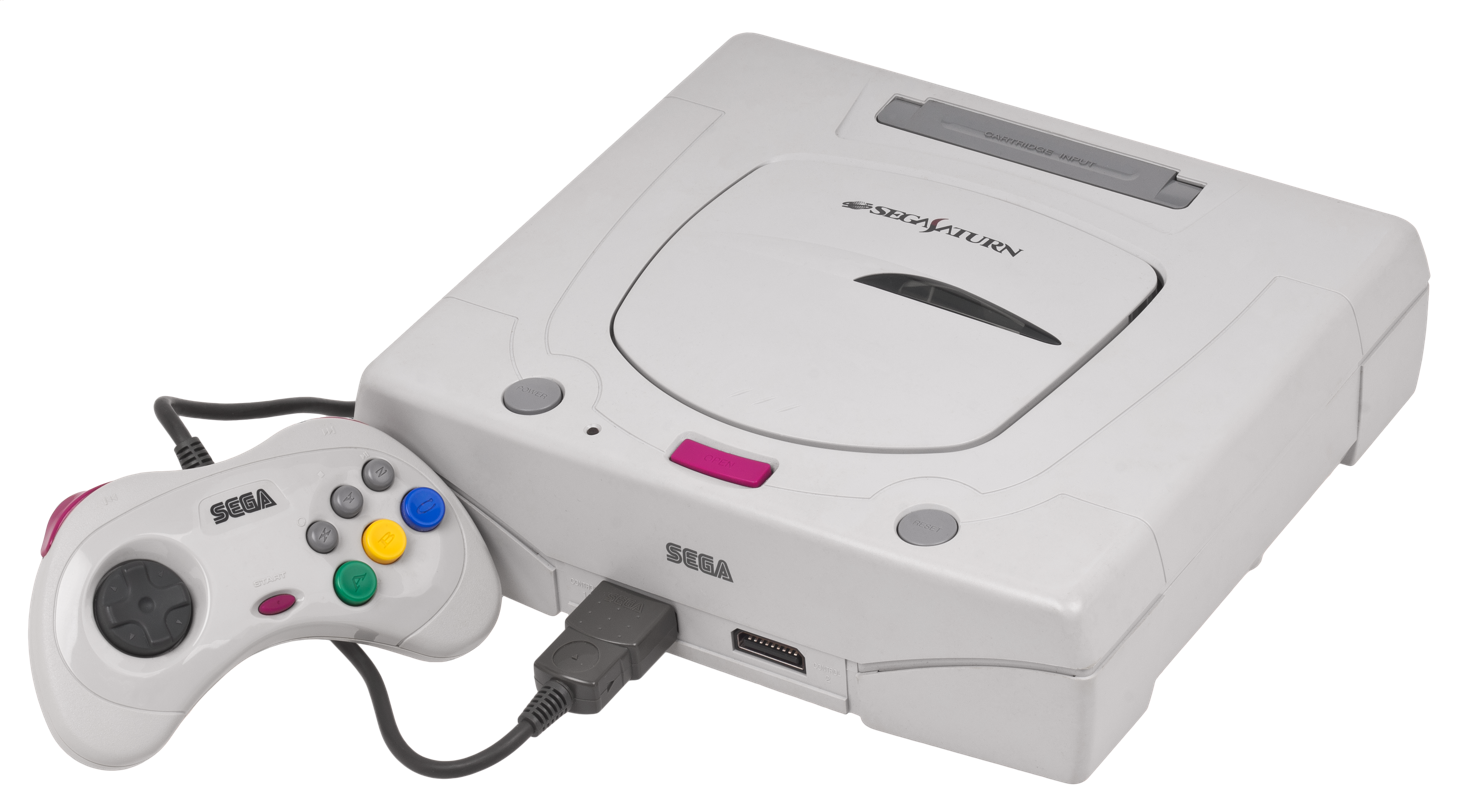
- Top: Model 2 from North America; Bottom: Model 2 from Japan
- Also known as: KOR: Samsung Saturn
- Manufacturer: Sega
- Type: Home video game console
- Generation: Fifth
- Released: JP: November 22, 1994; NA: May 11, 1995; EU: July 8, 1995
- Lifespan: 1994–2000
- Introductory price: ¥44,800 (equivalent to ¥50,643 in 2024); US$399.99 (equivalent to $845 in 2025); £399.99 (equivalent to £822 in 2025)
- Discontinued: EU: 1998; NA: March 1998; JP: 2000
- Units sold: Worldwide: 9.26 million; Japan: 5.75 million; United States: 1.8 million; Europe: 1 million; Elsewhere: 530,000
- Media: CD-ROM, CD+G, CD+EG, Video CD, Mini CD, Photo CD, e-book
- CPU: 2× Hitachi SH-2 @ 28.6 MHz
- Memory: 2 MB RAM, 1.5 MB VRAM, 512 KB sound RAM, expandable with Extended RAM Cartridge
- Storage: Internal RAM, cartridge
- Graphics: VDP1 & VDP2 video display processors each running @ 28.63636 MHz
- Sound: Yamaha YMF292
- Online services: Sega NetLink
- Best-selling game: Virtua Fighter 2, 1.7 million (list)
- Predecessor: Sega Genesis
- Successor: Dreamcast

The Sega Saturn (Note: Japanese: セガサターン, Hepburn: Sega Satān) (Note: In Asia, the console's name is commonly romanized as SegaSaturn.) is a home video game console developed by Sega and released on November 22, 1994, in Japan, May 11, 1995, in North America, and July 8, 1995, in Europe. Part of the fifth generation of video game consoles, it is the successor to the successful Genesis. The Saturn has a dual-CPU architecture and eight processors. Its games are in CD-ROM format, including several ports of arcade games and original games.

Development of the Saturn began in 1992, the same year Sega's groundbreaking 3D Model 1 arcade hardware debuted. The Saturn was designed around a new CPU from the Japanese electronics company Hitachi. Another video display processor was added in early 1994 to better compete with the 3D graphics of Sony's forthcoming PlayStation.

The Saturn was initially successful in Japan but not in the United States, where it was hindered by a surprise May 1995 launch, four months before its scheduled release date. After the debut of the Nintendo 64 in late 1996, the Saturn rapidly lost market share in the US, where it was discontinued in 1998. The Saturn is considered a commercial failure; this was affected by the cancellation of Sonic X-treme, planned as the first 3D entry in Sega's popular Sonic the Hedgehog series. The Saturn was succeeded in 1998 by the Dreamcast, having sold 9.26 million units sold worldwide, most in Japan.

Well-regarded Saturn games include Nights into Dreams, the Panzer Dragoon series and the Virtua Fighter series, although many Saturn games were not released outside Japan. The Saturn's reception is mixed due to its complex hardware design and limited third-party support; Sega's management has been criticized for its decisions during the Saturn's development and discontinuation.

== History ==
=== Background ===
In the early 1990s, Sega had success with the Genesis (known as the Mega Drive in most countries outside of North America), backed by aggressive advertising campaigns and the popularity of its Sonic the Hedgehog series. Sega also had success with arcade games; in 1992 and 1993, the new Sega Model 1 arcade system board showcased Sega AM2's Virtua Racing and Virtua Fighter (the first 3D fighting game), crucial to popularizing 3D polygonal graphics. The Model 1 was expensive, so several alternatives helped bring Sega's newest arcade games to Genesis, such as the Virtua Processor chip used for Virtua Racing, and the 32X add-on.

=== Development ===
Development of the Saturn was supervised by Hideki Sato, Sega's director and deputy general manager of research and development. According to project manager Hideki Okamura, the project codenamed Saturn started over two years before its announcement at the Tokyo Toy Show in June 1994. It was developed by the same team that developed the System 32 arcade board. Sato regrets that he did not go with the Model 1 arcade hardware as a base, as he was too concerned of leaving all the developers behind that were focused on sprites rather than 3D, which were the majority of developers.

In 1993, Sega and the Japanese electronics company Hitachi formed a joint venture to develop a new CPU for the Saturn, which resulted in the creation of the "SuperH RISC Engine" (or SH-2) later that year. The Saturn was designed around a dual-SH2 configuration. According to Kazuhiro Hamada, Sega's section chief for Saturn development during the system's conception, "the SH-2 was chosen for reasons of cost and efficiency. The chip has a calculation system similar to a DSP [digital signal processor], but we realized that a single CPU would not be enough to calculate a 3D world." Although the Saturn's design was largely finished before the end of 1993, reports in early 1994 of the technical capabilities of Sony's upcoming PlayStation console prompted Sega to include another video display processor (VDP) to improve 2D performance and 3D texture mapping. Sega considered making CD-ROM-based and cartridge-only versions of the Saturn, but discarded the idea due to concerns over the lower quality and higher price of cartridge games.

According to president Tom Kalinske, Sega of America "fought against the architecture of Saturn for quite some time". Seeking an alternative graphics chip for the Saturn, Kalinske attempted to broker a deal with Silicon Graphics, but Sega of Japan rejected the proposal. Silicon Graphics subsequently collaborated with Nintendo on the Nintendo 64. Kalinske, Sony Electronic Publishing's Olaf Olafsson, and Sony America's Micky Schulhof had discussed development of a joint "Sega/Sony hardware system", which never materialized due to Sega's desire to create hardware for both 2D and 3D visuals and Sony's competing notion of focusing on 3D technology. Publicly, Kalinske defended the Saturn's design: "Our people feel that they need the multiprocessing to be able to bring to the home what we're doing next year in the arcades."

In 1993, Sega restructured its internal studios in preparation for the Saturn's launch. To ensure high-quality 3D games would be available early in the Saturn's life, and to create a more energetic working environment, developers from Sega's arcade division were asked to create console games. New teams, such as the Panzer Dragoon developer Team Andromeda, were formed during this time. In early 1994, the Sega Titan Video arcade system was announced as an arcade counterpart to the Saturn. In April 1994, Acclaim Entertainment announced it would be the first American publisher to produce software for the Titan.

In January 1994, Sega began to develop the 32X add-on for the Genesis, as a less expensive entry into the 32-bit era. The 32X was approved by Sega CEO Hayao Nakayama and widely supported by Sega of America employees. According to the former Sega of America producer Scot Bayless, Nakayama was worried that the Saturn would not be available until after 1994 and that the recently released Atari Jaguar would reduce Sega's hardware sales. As a result, Nakayama ordered his engineers to have the system ready for launch by the end of the year. The 32X would not be compatible with the Saturn, but Sega executive Richard Brudvik-Lindner pointed out that the 32X would play Genesis games, and had the same system architecture as the Saturn. This was justified by Sega's statement that both platforms would run at the same time, and that the 32X would be aimed at players who could not afford the more expensive Saturn. According to Sega of America research and development head Joe Miller, the 32X familiarized development teams with the dual SH-2 architecture also used in the Saturn. Because the machines share many parts and were prepared to launch around the same time, tensions emerged between Sega of America and Sega of Japan when the Saturn was given priority.

=== Launch ===
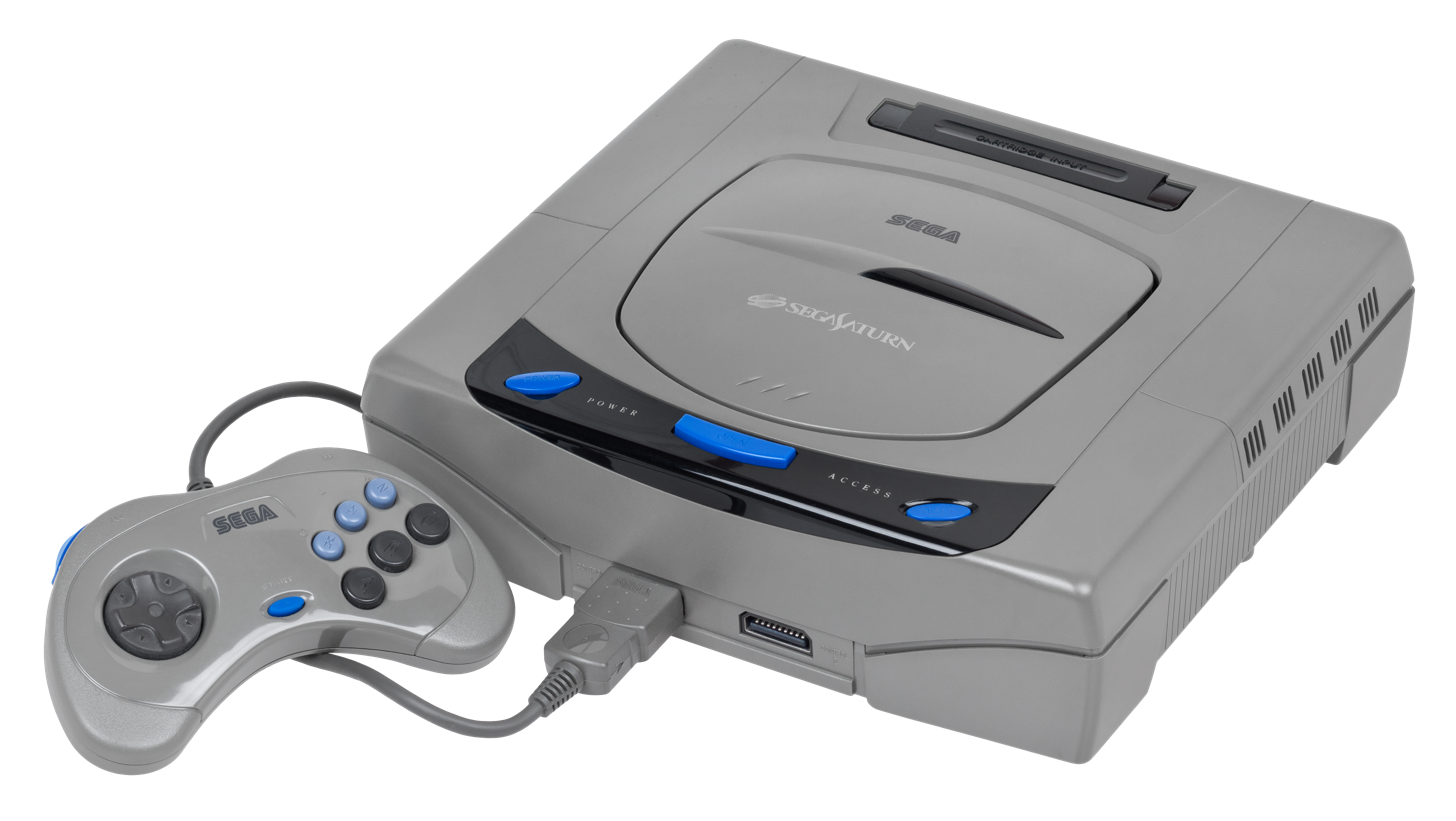
A first-model Japanese Saturn unit

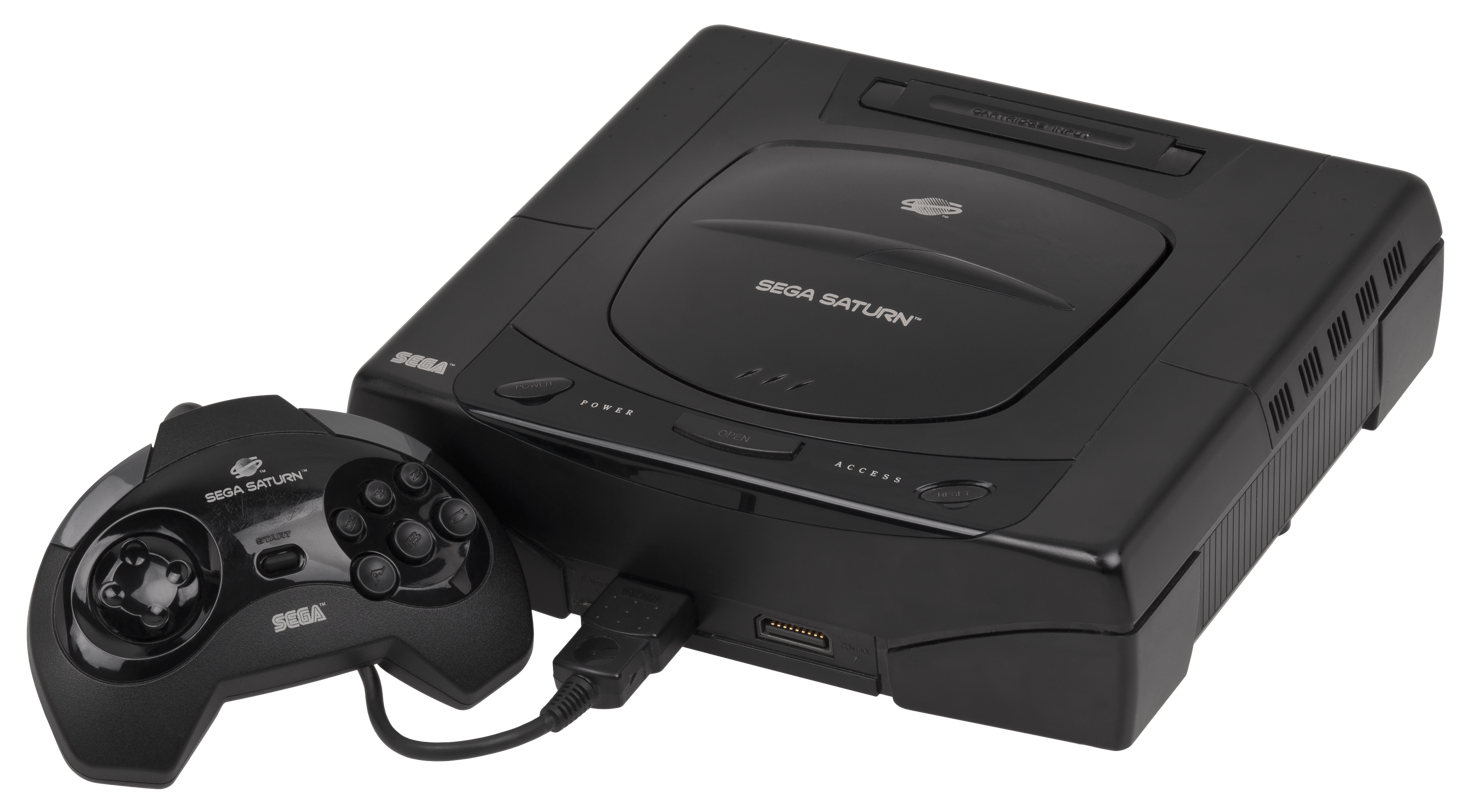
A first-model American Saturn unit

Sega released the Saturn in Japan on November 22, 1994, at a price of ¥44,800 (equivalent to US$440 at the time). Virtua Fighter, a faithful port of the popular arcade game, sold at a nearly one-to-one ratio with the Saturn console at launch and was crucial to the system's early success in Japan. Though Sega had wanted to launch with Clockwork Knight and Panzer Dragoon, the only other first-party game available at launch was Wan Chai Connection. Boosted by the popularity of Virtua Fighter, Sega's initial shipment of 200,000 Saturn units sold out on the first day. Sega waited until the December 3 launch of the PlayStation to ship more units; when both were sold side by side, the Saturn proved more popular. In Hong Kong, Japanese-market Saturn consoles were the predominant models sold by local video game retailers during the mid-1990s, according to a 2019 retrospective by HK01. In South Korea, Samsung Electronics officially introduced the console under the name Samsung Saturn (삼성 새턴) in late 1995, following a distribution agreement with Sega. Lifetime sales figures for the Saturn in South Korea are unknown. However, a February 1998 report by ETNews estimated that approximately 500 Saturn consoles were distributed between December 1997 and January 1998, compared with 300 Nintendo 64 consoles and 200 PlayStation consoles.

Meanwhile, Sega released the 32X on November 21, 1994, in North America, December 3, 1994, in Japan, and January 1995 in PAL territories, at less than half of the Saturn's launch price. After the holiday season, however, interest in the 32X rapidly declined. Half a million Saturn units were sold in Japan by the end of 1994 (compared to 300,000 PlayStation units), and sales exceeded 1 million within the following six months. There were conflicting reports that the PlayStation had a higher sell-through rate, and the system gradually began to overtake the Saturn in sales during 1995. Sony attracted many third-party developers to the PlayStation with a liberal $10 licensing fee, excellent development tools, and the introduction of a 7- to 10-day order system that allowed publishers to meet demand more efficiently than the 10- to 12-week lead times for cartridges that had previously been standard in the Japanese video game industry.

In March 1995, Sega of America CEO Tom Kalinske announced the Saturn's launch in the U.S. on "Saturnday" (Saturday), September 2, 1995. Sega of Japan had mandated an early launch to give the Saturn an advantage over the PlayStation. At the first Electronic Entertainment Expo (E3) in Los Angeles on May 11, 1995, Kalinske gave a keynote presentation in which he revealed the release price of $399 (including a copy of Virtua Fighter), and described the features of the console. Kalinske also revealed that, due to "high consumer demand", Sega had already shipped 30,000 Saturns to Toys "R" Us, Babbage's, Electronics Boutique, and Software Etc. for immediate release. The announcement upset retailers who were not informed of the surprise release, including Best Buy and Walmart; KB Toys, which was not part of the early launch, responded by refusing to carry the Saturn and its games. Sony subsequently unveiled the retail price for the PlayStation; Olaf Olafsson, the head of Sony Computer Entertainment America (SCEA), summoned Steve Race to the stage, who uttered "Two ninety-nine." (as in $299), and then walked away to applause. The Saturn's release in Europe also came before the previously announced North American date, on July 8, 1995, at £399.99. European retailers and press did not have time to promote the system or its games, harming sales. The PlayStation launched in Europe on September 29, 1995; by November, it had already outsold the Saturn by a factor of three in the United Kingdom, where Sony had allocated £20 million of marketing during the holiday season compared to Sega's £4 million. In Spain, Sega reported stronger early sales: in January 1996, Sega España marketing director Begoña Sanz stated that the Saturn had been outselling the PlayStation by two to one since November 1995. Contemporary estimates were disputed, however; in the same report, Spanish distributor Arcadia Software estimated substantially higher sales for the PlayStation.

The Saturn's U.S. launch was accompanied by a reported $50 million advertising campaign including coverage in publications such as Wired and Playboy. Early advertising for the system was targeted at a more mature, adult audience than the Genesis ads. The early rescheduling yielded only six launch games (all published by Sega) because most third-party games were scheduled around the original launch date. Virtua Fighter's relative lack of popularity in the West, combined with a release schedule of only two games between the surprise launch and September 1995, prevented Sega from capitalizing on the Saturn's early timing. Within two days of its North American launch on September 9, 1995, the PlayStation, backed by a large marketing campaign, had more units sold than the Saturn had in the five months following its surprise launch, with almost all of the initial shipment of 100,000 units being sold in advance, and the rest selling out across the U.S.

A high-quality port of the Namco arcade game Ridge Racer contributed to the PlayStation's early success, and garnered favorable media in comparison to the Saturn version of Sega's Daytona USA, which was considered inferior to its arcade counterpart. Namco, a longtime arcade competitor with Sega, also unveiled the Namco System 11 arcade board, based on raw PlayStation hardware. Although the System 11 is technically inferior to Sega's Model 2 arcade board, its lower price made it attractive to smaller arcades. Following a 1994 acquisition of Sega developers, Namco released Tekken for the System 11 and PlayStation. Directed by former Virtua Fighter designer Seiichi Ishii, Tekken was intended to be fundamentally similar, with the addition of detailed textures and twice the frame rate. Tekken surpassed Virtua Fighter in popularity due to its superior graphics and nearly arcade-perfect console port, becoming the first million-selling PlayStation game.

On October 2, Sega announced a Saturn price reduction to $299. High-quality Saturn ports of the Sega Model 2 arcade hits Sega Rally Championship, Virtua Cop, and Virtua Fighter 2 (running at 60 frames per second at a high resolution) were available by the end of the year and were generally regarded as superior to competitors on the PlayStation. Notwithstanding a subsequent increase in Saturn sales during the 1995 holiday season, the games were not enough to reverse the PlayStation's decisive lead. By 1996, the PlayStation had a considerably larger library than the Saturn, although Sega hoped to generate interest with upcoming exclusives such as Nights into Dreams. An informal survey of retailers showed that the Saturn and PlayStation sold in roughly equal numbers during the first quarter of 1996. Within its first year, the PlayStation secured over 20% of the entire U.S. video game market. On the first day of the May 1996 E3 show, Sony announced a PlayStation price reduction to $199, a reaction to the release of the Model 2 Saturn in Japan at a price roughly equivalent to $199. On the second day, Sega announced it would match this price, though Saturn hardware was more expensive to manufacture.

=== Changes at Sega ===
I thought the world of [Hayao] Nakayama because of his love of software. We spoke about building a new hardware platform that I would be very, very involved with, shape the direction of this platform, and hire a new team of people and restructure Sega. That, to me, was a great opportunity.

— Bernie Stolar on joining Sega of America

After the launch of the PlayStation and Saturn, sales of 16-bit games and consoles continued to account for 64% of the video game market in 1995. Sega underestimated the continued popularity of the Genesis, and did not have the inventory to meet demand. Sega was able to capture 43% of the dollar share of the U.S. video game market and sell more than 2 million Genesis units in 1995, but Kalinske estimated that "we could have sold another 300,000 Genesis systems in the November/December timeframe." Nakayama's decision to focus on the Saturn over the Genesis, based on the systems' relative performance in Japan, has been cited as the major contributing factor in this miscalculation.

Due to long-standing disagreements with Sega of Japan, Kalinske lost interest in his work as CEO of Sega of America. By early 1996, rumors were circulating that Kalinske planned to leave Sega, and a July 13 article in the press reported speculation that Sega of Japan was planning significant changes to Sega of America's management. On July 16, 1996, Sega announced that Kalinske would leave Sega after September 30, and that Shoichiro Irimajiri had been appointed chairman and CEO of Sega of America. A former Honda executive, Irimajiri had been involved with Sega of America since joining Sega in 1993. Sega also announced that David Rosen and Nakayama had resigned from their positions as chairman and co-chairman of Sega of America, though both remained with the company. Bernie Stolar, a former executive at Sony Computer Entertainment of America, was named Sega of America's executive vice president in charge of product development and third-party relations. Stolar, who had arranged a six-month PlayStation exclusivity deal for Mortal Kombat 3 and helped build close relations with Electronic Arts while at Sony, was perceived as a major asset by Sega officials. Finally, Sega of America made plans to expand its PC software business.

Stolar was not supportive of the Saturn, deciding it was poorly designed, and publicly announced at E3 1997 that "the Saturn is not our future". Though Stolar had "no interest in lying to people" about the Saturn's prospects, he continued to emphasize quality games for the system, and later said that "we tried to wind it down as cleanly as we could for the consumer". At Sony, Stolar had opposed the localization of Japanese games that he decided would not represent PlayStation well in North America, and advocated a similar policy for the Saturn, although he later sought to distance himself from his actions. These changes were accompanied by a softer image that Sega was beginning to portray in its advertising, including removing the "Sega!" scream and holding press events for the education industry. Marketing for the Saturn in Japan also changed with the introduction of Segata Sanshiro (played by Hiroshi Fujioka), a character in a series of TV advertisements starting in 1997; the character eventually starred in a Saturn game.

Temporarily abandoning arcade development, Sega AM2 head Yu Suzuki began developing several Saturn-exclusive games, including a role-playing game in the Virtua Fighter series. Initially conceived as an obscure prototype, "The Old Man and the Peach Tree", and intended to address the flaws of contemporary Japanese RPGs (such as poor non-player character artificial intelligence routines), Virtua Fighter RPG evolved into a planned 11-part, 45-hour "revenge epic in the tradition of Chinese cinema", which Suzuki hoped would become the Saturn's killer app. The game was eventually released as Shenmue for the Saturn's successor, the Dreamcast.

=== Cancellation of Sonic X-treme ===
Chris Senn and Ofer Alon's version of Sonic X-treme was canceled, and the lack of a fully 3D Sonic the Hedgehog platformer became a significant factor in the Saturn's commercial failure.

As Sonic Team was working on Nights into Dreams, Sega tasked the U.S.-based Sega Technical Institute (STI) with developing the first fully 3D entry in its popular Sonic the Hedgehog series. The game, Sonic X-treme, was moved to the Saturn after several prototypes for other hardware (including the 32X) were discarded. It featured a fisheye lens camera system that rotated levels with Sonic's movement. After Nakayama ordered the game be reworked around the engine created for its boss battles, the developers were forced to work between 16 and 20 hours a day to meet their December 1996 deadline. Weeks of development were wasted after Stolar rescinded STI's access to Sonic Team's Nights into Dreams engine following an ultimatum by Nights programmer Yuji Naka. After programmer Ofer Alon quit and designers Chris Senn and Chris Coffin became ill, Sonic X-Treme was cancelled in early 1997. Sonic Team started work on an original 3D Sonic game for the Saturn, but development shifted to the Dreamcast as Sonic Adventure. STI was disbanded in 1996 as a result of changes in management at Sega of America.

Journalists and fans have speculated about the impact a completed X-treme might have had on the market. David Houghton of GamesRadar described the prospect of "a good 3D Sonic game" on the Saturn as "a 'What if...' situation on a par with the dinosaurs not becoming extinct". IGN's Travis Fahs called X-treme "the turning point not only for Sega's mascot and their 32-bit console, but for the entire company [and] an empty vessel for Sega's ambitions and the hopes of their fans". Dave Zdyrko, who operated a prominent Saturn fan website during the system's lifespan, said: "I don't know if [X-treme] could've saved the Saturn, but [...] Sonic helped make the Genesis and it made absolutely no sense why there wasn't a great new Sonic title ready at or near the launch of the [Saturn]." In a 2007 retrospective, producer Mike Wallis maintained that X-treme "definitely would have been competitive" with Nintendo's Super Mario 64. Next Generation reported in late 1996 that X-treme would have harmed Sega's reputation if it did not compare well to contemporary competition. Naka said he had been relieved by the cancellation, because the game was not promising.

=== Decline ===
From 1993 to early 1996, although Sega's revenue declined as part of an industry-wide slowdown, the company retained control of 38% of the U.S. video game market (compared to Nintendo's 30% and Sony's 24%). 800,000 PlayStation units were sold in the U.S. by the end of 1995, compared to 400,000 Saturn units. In part due to an aggressive price war, the PlayStation outsold the Saturn by two to one in 1996, and Sega's 16-bit sales declined markedly. By the end of 1996, the PlayStation had 2.9 million units sold in the U.S., more than twice the 1.2 million Saturn units sold. The Christmas 1996 "Three Free" pack, which bundled the Saturn with Daytona USA, Virtua Fighter 2, and Virtua Cop, drove sales dramatically and ensured the Saturn remained a competitor into 1997.

However, the Saturn failed to take the lead. After the launch of the Nintendo 64 in 1996, sales of the Saturn and its games were sharply reduced, and the PlayStation outsold the Saturn by three-to-one in the U.S. in 1997. The 1997 release of Final Fantasy VII significantly increased the PlayStation's popularity in Japan. The game helped push PlayStation sales ahead of the Saturn in Japan, after the PlayStation and Saturn had been very close in Japan prior to the game's release. As of August 1997, Sony controlled 47% of the console market, Nintendo 40%, and Sega only 12%. Neither price cuts nor high-profile game releases proved helpful. Reflecting decreased demand for the system, worldwide Saturn shipments during March to September 1997 declined from 2.35 million to 600,000 versus the same period in 1996; shipments in North America declined from 800,000 to 50,000. Due to the Saturn's poor performance in North America, 60 of Sega of America's 200 employees were laid off in late 1997.

I thought the Saturn was a mistake as far as hardware was concerned. The games were obviously terrific, but the hardware just wasn't there.

— Bernie Stolar, former president of Sega of America, assessed the Saturn in 2009.

As a result of Sega's deteriorating financial situation, Nakayama resigned as president in January 1998 in favor of Irimajiri. Stolar subsequently acceded to president of Sega of America. Following five years of generally declining profits, in the fiscal year ending March 31, 1998, Sega suffered its first parent and consolidated financial losses since its 1988 listing on the Tokyo Stock Exchange. Due to a 54.8% decline in consumer product sales (including a 75.4% decline overseas), the company reported a net loss of ¥43.3 billion ($327.8 million) and a consolidated net loss of ¥35.6 billion ($269.8 million).

Shortly before announcing its financial losses, Sega announced that it was discontinuing the Saturn in North America to prepare for the launch of its successor. Only 7 Saturn games were released in North America in 1998 (Magic Knight Rayearth is the final official release), compared to 119 in 1996. The Saturn lasted longer in Japan, with Irimajiri announcing in early 1998 that Sega would continue supporting the Saturn in Japan after its successor was released. Between June 1996 and August 1998, a further 1,103,468 consoles and 29,685,781 games were sold in Japan, giving the Saturn a Japanese attach rate of 16.71 games per console, the highest of that generation. As of February 1997, the attach rate was four games per console worldwide.

Rumors about the upcoming Dreamcast, spread mainly by Sega, were leaked to the public before the last Saturn games were released. The Dreamcast was released on November 27, 1998, in Japan and on September 9, 1999, in North America. The decision to abandon the Saturn effectively left the Western market without Sega games for over one year. Sega suffered an additional ¥42.881 billion consolidated net loss in the fiscal year ending March 1999 and announced plans to eliminate 1,000 jobs, nearly a quarter of its workforce.

Worldwide Saturn sales include at least the following amounts in each territory: 5.75 million in Japan (surpassing Genesis sales of 3.58 million there), 1.8 million in the United States, 1 million in Europe, and 530,000 elsewhere. With lifetime sales of 9.26 million units, the Saturn is considered a commercial failure, although its install base in Japan, where it did better than the West, surpassed the Nintendo 64's 5.54 million, where it became Sega's highest-selling home console. The Saturn ultimately shipped more than 6 million units in Japan. Lack of distribution has been cited as a significant factor of the Saturn's failure, because the system's surprise launch had damaged Sega's reputation with key retailers. Conversely, Nintendo's long delay in releasing a 3D console and damage to Sega's reputation caused by poorly supported Genesis add-ons are considered major factors allowing Sony's establishment in the video game market.

== Technical specifications ==
Hitachi SH-2	Saturn sound processor	Motorola 68EC000
Hitachi SH-2	Saturn Custom Sound Processor (SCSP)	Motorola 68EC000
Video display processor 1	Video display processor 2	Saturn motherboard
Video Display Processor 1 (VDP1)	Video Display Processor 2 (VDP2)	Saturn motherboard

Featuring eight processors, the Saturn's central processing units are two Hitachi SH-2 microprocessors clocked at 28.6 MHz and capable of 56 MIPS. It uses a Motorola 68EC000 running at 11.3 MHz as a sound controller; a custom sound processor with an integrated Yamaha FH1 DSP running at 22.6 MHz capable of up to 32 sound channels with both FM synthesis and 16-bit 44.1 kHz pulse-code modulation; and two video display processors: the VDP1 (which handles sprites and polygons) and the VDP2 (which handles backgrounds). Its double-speed CD-ROM drive is controlled by a dedicated Hitachi SH-1 processor to reduce load time. The System Control Unit (SCU), which controls all buses and functions as a co-processor of the main SH-2 CPU, has an internal DSP running at 14.3 MHz. It features a cartridge slot that allows memory expansion, 16 Mbit of work random-access memory (RAM), 12 Mbit of video RAM, 4 Mbit of RAM for sound functions, 4 Mbit of CD buffer RAM and 256 Kbit (32 KB) of battery backup RAM. Its RCA video output displays at resolutions from 320×224 to 704×224 pixels, with up to 16.78 million colors. The Saturn measures 260 mm × 230 mm × 83 mm (10.2 in × 9.1 in × 3.3 in). It was packaged with an instruction manual, control pad, stereo AV cable, and 100 V AC power supply consuming approximately 15 W.

One very fast central processor would be preferable. I don't think all programmers have the ability to program two CPUs—most can only get about one-and-a-half times the speed you can get from one SH-2. I think that only 1 in 100 programmers are good enough to get this kind of speed [double] out of the Saturn.

— Yu Suzuki reflecting on Saturn Virtua Fighter development

The Saturn had technically impressive hardware at the time of its release, but its complexity made harnessing this power difficult for developers accustomed to conventional programming. The greatest disadvantage was that both CPUs shared the same bus and were unable to access system memory at the same time. Making full use of the 4 KB of cache memory in each CPU was critical to maintaining performance. For example, Virtua Fighter used one CPU for each character, while Nights used one CPU for 3D environments and the other for 2D objects. The Visual Display Processor 2 (VDP2), which can generate and manipulate backgrounds, has also been cited as one of the system's most important features.

The Saturn's design elicited mixed commentary among game developers and journalists. Developers quoted by Next Generation in December 1995 described the Saturn as "a real coder's machine [for] those who love to get their teeth into assembly and really hack the hardware [with] more flexibility [and] more calculating power than the PlayStation". The sound board was widely praised. Lobotomy Software programmer Ezra Dreisbach described the Saturn as significantly slower than the PlayStation, whereas Kenji Eno of WARP observed little difference. In particular, Dreisbach criticized the Saturn's use of quadrilaterals as its basic geometric primitive, in contrast to the triangles rendered by the PlayStation and the Nintendo 64. Ken Humphries of Time Warner Interactive remarked that compared to the PlayStation, the Saturn was worse at generating polygons but better at sprites. Third-party development was initially hindered by the lack of useful software libraries and development tools, requiring developers to use assembly language. During early Saturn development, programming in assembly had a speed increase of two to five times above higher-level languages such as C.

Sega responded to complaints about the difficulty of programming for the Saturn by writing new graphics libraries which were claimed to make development easier. Sega of America purchased a United Kingdom-based development firm, Cross Products, to produce the Saturn's development system. Treasure CEO Masato Maegawa stated that the Nintendo 64 was more difficult to develop for than the Saturn. Traveller's Tales founder Jon Burton said that though the PlayStation was easier "to get started on [...] you quickly reach [its] limits", whereas the Saturn's "complicated [hardware could] improve the speed and look of a game when all used together correctly". A major criticism was the Saturn's use of 2D sprites to generate polygons and simulate 3D space. The PlayStation has a different design, based entirely on 3D triangle-based polygonal rendering, with no direct 2D support. As a result, several analysts described the Saturn as an "essentially" 2D system. For example, Steven L. Kent stated: "Although Nintendo and Sony had true 3D game machines, Sega had a 2D console that did a good job with 3D objects but wasn't optimized for 3D environments." The Saturn hardware is extremely difficult to emulate.

1st North American controller	3D Pad	NetLink Modem
Model 1 North American/European controller	3D Pad	NetLink Modem
2nd North American controller	Saturn multitap	RAM backup cartridge
Model 2 North American/European controller	Saturn multitap	RAM backup cartridge

Several Saturn models were produced in Japan. An updated model in a recolored light gray (officially white) was released at ¥20,000 to reduce the system's cost and raise its appeal among women and younger children. Two models were released by third parties: Hitachi released the Hi-Saturn (a smaller model equipped with a car navigation function), and JVC released the V-Saturn. Saturn controllers have various complementary color schemes. The system also supports several accessories. A wireless controller powered by AA batteries uses infrared signal to connect. Designed to work with Nights, the Saturn 3D Pad includes both a control pad and an analog stick for directional input. Sega also released several versions of arcade sticks as peripherals, including the Virtua Stick, the Virtua Stick Pro, the Mission Analog Stick, and the Twin Stick. Sega created a light gun peripheral, the Virtua Gun, for shooting games such as Virtua Cop, and the Arcade Racer, a wheel for racing games. The Play Cable connects two Saturn consoles for multiplayer gaming across two screens, and a multitap connects up to six players to the same console. One console with two multitaps can support up to 12 players. Other accessories include RAM expansion cartridges, keyboard, mouse, floppy disk drive, and movie card. A proposed graphics accelerator add-on using the Hitachi SH-3 chipset was canceled.

Like the Genesis, the Saturn had an Internet-based gaming service. The Sega NetLink is a 28.8k modem for the cartridge slot for direct dial multiplayer games Daytona USA, Duke Nukem 3D, Saturn Bomberman, Sega Rally, and Virtual On: Cyber Troopers. In Japan, a pay-to-play service was used. It can be used for web browsing, email, and online chat. Because the NetLink was released before the keyboard, Sega produced a series of CDs containing hundreds of website addresses so that Saturn owners could browse with the joypad. In 1995, Sega announced a variant of the Saturn featuring a built-in NetLink modem codenamed Pluto, but it was never released.

Sega developed a Saturn-based arcade board, the Sega ST-V (or Titan), intended as an affordable alternative to Sega's Model 2 arcade board and as a testing ground for upcoming Saturn software. The Titan was criticized for its comparatively weak performance compared to the Sega Model 2 arcade system by Yu Suzuki, and it was overproduced by Sega's arcade division. Because Sega already had the Die Hard license, members of Sega AM1 working at the Sega Technical Institute developed Die Hard Arcade for the Titan to clear excess inventory. Die Hard became the most successful Sega arcade game produced in the United States at that point. Other games released for the Titan include Golden Axe: The Duel and Virtua Fighter Kids.

== Game library ==
Much of the Saturn's library comprises Sega's arcade ports, including Daytona USA, The House of the Dead, Last Bronx, Sega Rally Championship, the Virtua Cop series, the Virtua Fighter series, and Virtual-On. Ports of 2D Capcom fighting games including Vampire Savior, X-Men vs. Street Fighter, Marvel Super Heroes vs. Street Fighter, and Street Fighter Alpha 3 were noted for their faithfulness to their arcade originals. Fighters Megamix, developed by Sega AM2 for the Saturn rather than arcades, combined characters from Fighting Vipers and Virtua Fighter to positive reviews.

Highly rated Saturn exclusives include Panzer Dragoon Saga, Dragon Force, Guardian Heroes, Nights, Panzer Dragoon II Zwei, and Shining Force III. PlayStation games such as Castlevania: Symphony of the Night, Resident Evil, and Wipeout 2097 received Saturn ports with mixed results. The first-person shooter PowerSlave featured some of the most impressive 3D graphics on the Saturn, leading Sega to contract its developers, Lobotomy Software, to produce ports of Duke Nukem 3D and Quake. While Electronic Arts's limited support for the Saturn and Sega's failure to develop a football game for late 1995 gave Sony the lead in the sports genre, Sega Sports published Saturn sports games including the well-regarded World Series Baseball and Sega Worldwide Soccer series.

Due to the cancellation of Sonic X-treme, the Saturn lacks an exclusive Sonic the Hedgehog platformer. Instead, it received a graphically enhanced port of the Genesis game Sonic 3D Blast, as well as the compilation Sonic Jam and the racing game Sonic R. The main character of the platformer Bug! was seen as a potential mascot for the Saturn, but failed to catch on as the Sonic series had. Instead, Sonic Team developed the score attack game Nights into Dreams, considered one of the most important Saturn games. The gameplay involves steering the imp-like protagonist Nights, as it flies on a mostly 2D plane across surreal stages. Although it lacked the fully 3D environments of Nintendo's Super Mario 64, the emphasis by Nights on unfettered movement and graceful acrobatic techniques showcased the intuitive potential of analog control. Sonic Team's next game, Burning Rangers, a fully 3D action-adventure game involving a team of outer-space firefighters, garnered praise for its transparency effects and distinctive art direction, but was released in limited quantities late in the Saturn's lifespan and criticized for its short length.

Many well-regarded Saturn games were exclusive to Japan, such as the Sakura Wars series. Co-developed by Sega and Red Entertainment, Sakura Wars mixes elements of tactical RPGs, anime cutscenes, and visual novels. Sakura Wars and Grandia helped popularize the Saturn in Japan, but never had a Western release due to Sega of America's policy of not localizing RPGs and other Japanese games that might not appeal to American consumers and might damage the Saturn's reputation in North America. Some games that launched on Saturn, such as Dead or Alive, Grandia, and Lunar: Silver Star Story Complete, were only released on the PlayStation in the West. Working Designs localized several Japanese Saturn games, but switched to PlayStation following a public feud between Stolar and the Working Designs president, Victor Ireland.

According to the review aggregator GameRankings, Panzer Dragoon Saga is the most acclaimed Saturn game. It was praised for its cinematic presentation, evocative plot, and unique battle system. However, Sega released fewer than 20,000 retail copies in North America in what IGN's Levi Buchanan characterized as an example of the Saturn's "ignominious send-off" in the region. Similarly, only the first of three installments of Shining Force III was released outside Japan. The Saturn's library was criticised for its lack of sequels to high-profile Sega Genesis franchises, with Sega of Japan's cancellation of a third installment in Sega of America's popular Eternal Champions series cited as a significant source of controversy.

Later ports of Saturn games including Guardian Heroes, Nights Into Dreams, and Shin Megami Tensei: Devil Summoner: Soul Hackers continued to garner positive reviews. Partly due to rarity, Saturn games such as Panzer Dragoon Saga and Radiant Silvergun are noted for their cult following. Due to the Saturn's commercial failure and hardware limitations, games such as Resident Evil 2, Shenmue, Sonic Adventure, and Virtua Fighter 3 were cancelled and moved to the Dreamcast.

== Reception and legacy ==
At the time of the Saturn's release, Famicom Tsūshin awarded it 24 out of 40, higher than the PlayStation's 19 out of 40. In June 1995, Dennis Lynch of the Chicago Tribune and Albert Kim of Entertainment Weekly praised the Saturn as the most advanced console available; Lynch praised the double-speed CD-ROM drive and "intense surround-sound capabilities" and Kim cited Panzer Dragoon as a "lyrical and exhilarating epic" demonstrating the ability of new technology to "transform" the industry. In December 1995, Next Generation gave the Saturn three and a half stars out of five, highlighting Sega's marketing and arcade background as strengths but the system's complexity as a weakness. Four critics in Electronic Gaming Monthly's December 1996 Buyer's Guide rated the Saturn 8, 6, 7, and 8 out of 10 and the PlayStation 9, 10, 9, and 9. By December 1998, EGM's reviews were more mixed, with reviewers citing the lack of games as a major problem. According to EGM reviewer Crispin Boyer, "the Saturn is the only system that can thrill me one month and totally disappoint me the next".

Retrospective feedback of the Saturn is mixed, but generally praises its game library. According to Greg Sewart of 1UP.com, "the Saturn will go down in history as one of the most troubled, and greatest, systems of all time". In 2009, IGN named the Saturn the 18th-best console of all time, praising its unique game library. According to the reviewers, "While the Saturn ended up losing the popularity contest to both Sony and Nintendo [...] Nights into Dreams, the Virtua Fighter and Panzer Dragoon series are all examples of exclusive titles that made the console a fan favorite." Edge noted that "hardened loyalists continue to reminisce about the console that brought forth games like Burning Rangers, Guardian Heroes, Dragon Force and Panzer Dragoon Saga". In 2015, The Guardian's Keith Stuart wrote that "the Saturn has perhaps the strongest line-up of 2D shooters and fighting games in console history".

Retro Gamer's Damien McFerran wrote: "Even today, despite the widespread availability of sequels and re-releases on other formats, the Sega Saturn is still a worthwhile investment for those who appreciate the unique gameplay styles of the companies that supported it." IGN's Adam Redsell wrote "[Sega's] devil-may-care attitude towards game development in the Saturn and Dreamcast eras is something that we simply do not see outside of the indie scene today." Necrosoft Games director Brandon Sheffield said that "the Saturn was a landing point for games that were too 'adult' in content for other systems, as it was the only one that allowed an 18+ rating for content in Japan [...] some games, like Enemy Zero used it to take body horror to new levels, an important step toward the expansion of games and who they served." Sewart praised the Saturn's first-party games as "Sega's shining moment as a game developer", with Sonic Team demonstrating its creative range and AM2 producing numerous technically impressive arcade ports. He also commented on the many Japan-exclusive Saturn releases, which he connected with a subsequent boom in the game import market. IGN's Travis Fahs was critical of the Saturn library's lack of "fresh ideas" and "precious few high-profile franchises", in contrast to what he described as Sega's more creative Dreamcast output.

Sega has been criticized for its management of the Saturn. McFerran said its management staff had "fallen out of touch with both the demands of the market and the industry". Stolar has also been criticized; according to Fahs, "Stolar's decision to abandon the Saturn made him a villain to many Sega fans, but [...] it was better to regroup than to enter the next fight battered and bruised. Dreamcast would be Stolar's redemption." Stolar defended his decision, saying, "I felt Saturn was hurting the company more than helping it. That was a battle that we weren't going to win." Sheffield said that the Saturn's quadrilaterals undermined third-party support, but because "nVidia invested in quads" at the same time, there had been "a remote possibility" they could have "become the standard instead of triangles [...] if somehow, magically, the Saturn were the most popular console of that era." Speaking more positively, former Working Designs president Victor Ireland described the Saturn as "the start of the future of console gaming" because it "got the better developers thinking and designing with parallel-processing architecture in mind for the first time". In GamesRadar, Justin Towell wrote that the Saturn's 3D Pad "set the template for every successful controller that followed, with analog shoulder triggers and left thumbstick [...] I don't see any three-pronged controllers around the office these days."

Douglass C. Perry of Gamasutra noted that, from its surprise launch to its ultimate failure, the Saturn "soured many gamers on Sega products". Sewart and IGN's Levi Buchanan cited the failure of the Saturn as the major reason for Sega's downfall as a hardware manufacturer, but USgamer's Jeremy Parish described it as "more a symptom [...] than a cause" of the decline, which began with add-ons for the Genesis that fragmented the market and continued with Sega of America's and Sega of Japan's competing designs for the Dreamcast. Sheffield portrayed Sega's mistakes with the Saturn as emblematic of the broader then-decline of the Japanese gaming industry: "They thought they were invincible, and that structure and hierarchy were necessary for their survival, but more flexibility, and a greater participation with the West could have saved them." According to Stuart, Sega "didn't see [...] the roots of a prevailing trend, away from arcade conversions and traditional role-playing adventures and toward a much wider console development community with fresh ideas about gameplay and structure". Pulp365 reviews editor Matt Paprocki concluded that "the Saturn is a relic, but an important one, which represents the harshness of progress and what it can leave in its wake".

== Bibliography ==
- DeMaria, Rusel; Wilson, Johnny L. (2004). High Score!: The Illustrated History of Electronic Games. Emeryville, California: McGraw-Hill/Osborne. ISBN 0-07-223172-6.
- Harris, Blake J. (2014). Console Wars: Sega, Nintendo, and the Battle That Defined a Generation. New York: HarperCollins. ISBN 978-0-06-227669-8.
- Kent, Steven L. (2001). The Ultimate History of Video Games: The Story Behind the Craze That Touched Our Lives and Changed the World. Roseville, California: Prima Publishing. ISBN 0-7615-3643-4.
- Mott, Tony (2013). 1001 Video Games You Must Play Before You Die. New York: Universe Publishing. ISBN 978-0-7893-2090-2.
