= The Clone Republic =

2006 novel by Steven L. Kent

- Author: Steven L. Kent
- Language: English
- Series: Clone
- Genre: Military science fiction
- Publisher: Berkley Publishing Group Penguin Group
- Publication date: September 28, 2006
- Publication place: United States
- Media type: Print (Paperback)
- Pages: 384
- ISBN: 0-441-01393-7
- OCLC: 65188351
- LC Class: CPB Box no. 2719 vol. 16
- Followed by: Rogue Clone

The Clone Republic is the first book in the Clone series of military science fiction novels, set in 2508 AD. It is followed by Rogue Clone, The Clone Alliance, The Clone Elite, The Clone Betrayal, The Clone Empire, The Clone Redemption, The Clone Sedition, The Clone Assassin, and The Clone Apocalypse.

== Plot ==
In a galactic military largely consisting of clones raised to be unquestioning soldiers, Wayson Harris initially has difficulty as he seemingly isn't a clone, and he does not follow orders as quickly. His first official posting, a desert planet named Gobi, seems like a punishment as there are problems with it such as poor discipline and contaminated drinking water. After Harris and a mercenary named Ray Freeman prevent an ex-general from killing all the marines and raiding the armory, Harris is promoted and transferred to the flagship Kamehameha. The Kamehameha deploys to the planet Ezer Kri, which is attempting to leave the Unified Authority and establish a nonstandard culture (namely, a Japanese one).

After a platoon is killed by locals (they ignite a fuel pumping station), marines are ordered to occupy the largest town on the planet, where Harris runs into Freeman. Freeman sends another soldier back with Harris's helmet on, then leads Harris to the hotel across the street where they ambush Kline, a man they'd dealt with in Gobi, wielding a rifle that has been set to track Harris's helmet signal.

During his interrogation, Kline is revealed to be a Morgan Atkins separatist (an influential terrorist group). Shortly thereafter, a fleet of separatist ships carrying the deserters from Ezer Kri flees from the planet before anyone can react.

== Background ==
The idea for The Clone Republic originated while Kent was writing a Star Wars video game strategy guide, which also included a short story. Kent replaced the Star Wars elements in a previous version after learning that Lucasfilm, which owns the rights to the franchise, did not want to publish it: "I finished it off as a Star Wars novel, and then I took everything Star Wars out and made it into my own world instead."

== Reception ==
Harold Goldberg of The Village Voice writes that the book features "taut writing and a truly imaginative plot full of introspection and philosophizing." Clinton Lawrence of Sci Fi Weekly wrote, "The Clone Republic doesn't break any new ground, and sometimes it seems a bit derivative of earlier science fiction, but it has no serious flaws. Kent is a skillful storyteller, and the book entertains throughout." The Honolulu Star-Bulletin also published a review of the book.

An audiobook version with a voice cast including Ken Jackson was published by GraphicAudio. The reviewer for AudioFile magazine wrote that "the narration by Jackson and his fellow actors never skips a beat."

== See also ==
- Star Wars: The Clone Wars (novel)
