= Ron Kent =

American woodturner

Norfolk Island pine bowl turned by Ron Kent, c. 1988, Smithsonian American Art Museum

Ronald E. Kent (1931 – December 15, 2018) was an American woodturner who was born in Chicago, Illinois. He ran his own investment company in Hawaii. In 1975, his wife Myra gave him an inexpensive lathe for Christmas. Not wanting to seem unappreciative, he walked down to the beach and found a piece of driftwood. Fitting it on the lathe, he turned a form from it with a sharpened screwdriver. In 1997, Kent took an early retirement from his financial profession to concentrate exclusively on woodturning. Kent lived in Honolulu, Hawaii.

Kent is best known for his translucent bowls made of Norfolk Island pine. His works are in the collections of the Bishop Museum (Honolulu, Hawaii), the Hawaii State Art Museum, the High Museum of Art (Atlanta, Georgia), the Honolulu Museum of Art, the Metropolitan Museum of Art (New York City), Musée des Arts Décoratifs (Paris) and the Smithsonian American Art Museum (Washington, D. C.).

Kent was the father of kimono redux artist Elizabeth Kent and novelist Steven L. Kent.

== Sources ==
- Heenan, David A., Double lives, crafting your life of work and passion for untold success, Palo Alto, California, Davies-Black Pub., 2002.
- International Art Society of Hawai'i, Kuilima Kākou, Hawai’i-Japan Joint Exhibition, Honolulu, International Art Society of Hawai'i, 2004, p. 21
- Morse, Marcia and Allison Wong, 10 Years: The Contemporary Museum at First Hawaiian Center, The Contemporary Museum, Honolulu, 2006, ISBN 1888254076, p. 59
- Shaw, Tib, "Anniversary Profile: Ron Kent, Member #17" American Association of Woodturners, 2016, https://www.woodturner.org/page/30YearKent
- Waterbury, Ruth and David Waterbury, Conversations with Wood, Minneapolis Institute of Arts, 2011, ISBN 0980048478, pp. 131–137
- Wong, Allison, 10 Years - The Contemporary Museum at First Hawaiian Center - Tenth Anniversary Exhibition, The Contemporary Museum, Honolulu, Hawaii, 2006, ISBN 9781888254075, p. 59
