= List of best-selling Sega Saturn games =

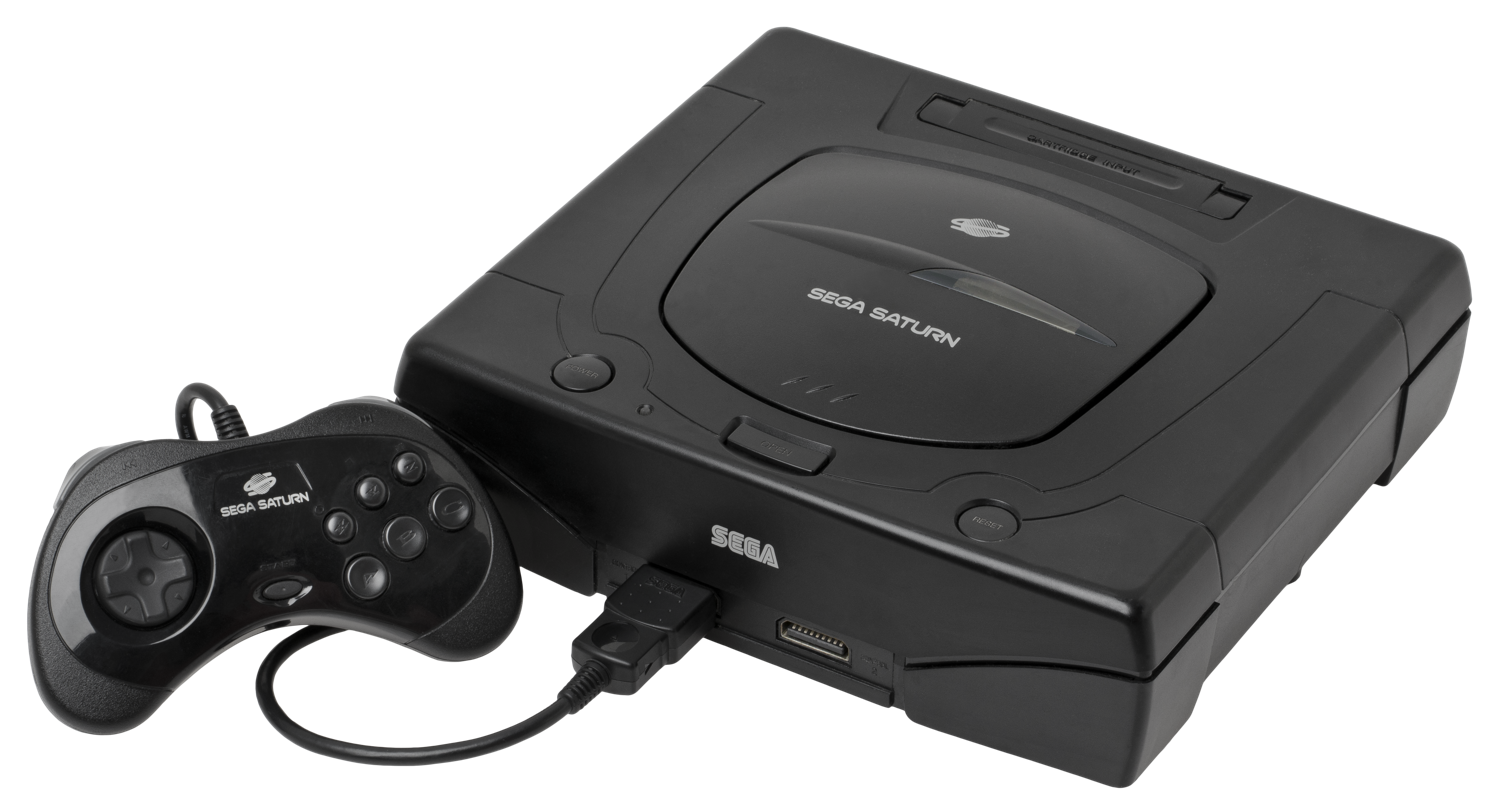

This is a list of best-selling video games for the Sega Saturn home video game console. The Saturn’s library comprises over 1,000 titles, including ports of arcade games as well as original console-exclusive games. The best-selling franchise on the system is the Virtua Fighter series, with Virtua Fighter 2 selling 2.5 million copies.

The Sega Saturn was released on November 22, 1994, in Japan and on May 11, 1995, in the United States. The console was a commercial success in Japan, selling 5.57 million units, but it failed to replicate the success of the Sega Mega Drive/Genesis in North America and Europe, where it sold 1.8 million and 1 million units, respectively.

== List ==
Game	Copies sold	Release date (Note: Only the initial release date on this platform is listed.)	Genre(s)	Developer(s)	Publisher(s)
Virtua Fighter 2	2.5 million (Note: Virtua Fighter 2 sales breakdown: Sales by August 1996 – 2,000,000; December 1996 Bundle – 500,000)	November 30, 1995	Fighting	Sega AM2	Sega
Virtua Fighter; Virtua Fighter Remix	1.5 million	November 22, 1994; July 14, 1995	Fighting	Sega AM2	Sega
Sega Rally Championship	1.2 million	November 15, 1995	Racing	Sega AM3	Sega
Virtua Cop	1.1 million (Note: Virtua Cop sales breakdown: Japan – 620,528; United States – 500,000)	November 24, 1995	Light gun shooter	Sega AM2	Sega
Daytona USA	1 million (Note: Daytona USA sales breakdown: Japan – 546,228; United States – 500,000)	April 1, 1995	Racing	Sega AM2	Sega
Grandia	1 million	December 18, 1997	Role-playing	Game Arts	Entertainment Software Publishing
Fighters Megamix	608,026	December 21, 1996	Fighting	Sega AM2	Sega
Sakura Wars 2: Thou Shalt Not Die	577,000	April 4, 1998	Tactical role-playing; Dating sim; Visual novel	Red Company	Sega
Sakura Wars	552,590	September 27, 1996	Tactical role-playing; Dating sim; Visual novel	Red Company	Sega
Nights Into Dreams	503,376	July 5, 1996	Action	Sonic Team	Sega
Enemy Zero	500,000	December 13, 1996	Survival Horror	Warp	Warp
J.League Pro Soccer Club o Tsukurou! 2	500,000	November 20, 1997	Sports	Sega	Sega
Super Robot Wars Final	498,009	April 23, 1998	Role-playing	Winkysoft	Banpresto
Shin Megami Tensei: Devil Summoner	472,932	December 25, 1995	Role-playing	Atlus	Atlus
Fighting Vipers	458,394	August 30, 1996	Fighting	Sega AM2	Sega
Virtual On: Cyber Troopers	438,409	November 8, 1996	Fighting	Sega AM3	Sega
Night Warriors: Darkstalkers' Revenge	433,101	February 23, 1996	Fighting	Capcom	Capcom
