= 100 Fathoms Below =

2018 novel by Nicholas Kaufmann and Steven L. Kent

- Author: Nicholas Kaufmann and Steven L. Kent
- Language: English
- Genre: Horror, suspense
- Publisher: Blackstone Press
- Publication date: October 9, 2018

100 Fathoms Below is a 2018 horror suspense novel by Nicholas Kaufmann and Steven L. Kent. The plot centers on the crew of the U.S.S. Roanoke, a nuclear submarine in the US Navy that is sent on a stealth mission into Soviet territory, while unknowingly being preyed upon by vampires in their midst. The novel received mostly positive reviews from critics with praise directed at its submarine setting.

== Publication history ==
An exclusive trailer for the book was published on Dread Central on September 27, 2018. The book was published by Blackstone Press on October 9, 2018.

== Plot ==
The novel takes place in 1983, during the height of the Cold War. During shore leave in Hawaii, petty officer Warren Stubic, a sailor on the U.S.S. Roanoke, is turned into a vampire by an aswang after visiting a brothel. Unaware of his condition, he boards the Roanoke shortly before it begins a classified mission to the Kamchatka Peninsula, where it is supposed to spy on the development of an advanced Soviet submarine.

Shortly before the mission, sailor Jerry White is transferred to the Roanoke and is viewed with suspicion by the Roanoke's command staff because he had filed a complaint about the former commander of his last ship. Sonar tech Tim Spicer is assigned to befriend White and keep an eye on him. Spicer soon begins to suspect that Stubic is ill and has been behind the vandalism of the submarine's fluorescent lights. Meanwhile, White is tormented by lieutenant Duncan, a close friend of White's former commander.

== Reception ==
The book received generally positive reviews, with particular praise for its use of the claustrophobic environment of a submarine as a source of horror and suspense. Anita Gates, writing for Library Journal, praised the character development and the inescapable submarine setting. Publishers Weekly described it as "The perfect blend of suspenseful political thriller and creepy horror". Toni V. Sweeney, of the New York Journal of Books, also praised the decision to base the book's vampire mythos on Philippine mythology.

Thomas Joyce of This Is Horror praised the well-researched portrayal of naval terminology and submarine operations, as well as the book's fast pace. Max Pfeffer of Geeks of Doom criticized the ensemble cast of characters, which he felt were flat and did not have enough time to develop. However, he praised the novel's atmosphere, writing that "the novel's main source of tension comes from the ever-present comprehension of the men that there really isn't anywhere to run when things go horribly wrong."

It was nominated for Best Horror Novel at the 2019 Dragon Awards, but lost to Melanie Golding's Little Darlings. Kaufmann attributed the book's commercial success to a post about it going viral on Twitter.
