= Nicholas Kaufmann =

American author of horror fiction, urban fantasy, and adventure fiction

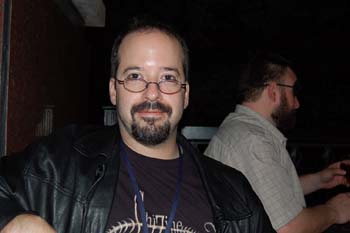
- Kaufmann at World Fantasy Convention 2006, photograph by Catriona Sparks
- Born: February 21, 1969 (age 57); New York City, U.S.
- Occupation: Author
- Writing career
- Language: English
- Genres: Horror fiction; Urban fantasy; Adventure fiction

Nicholas Kaufmann (born February 21, 1969) is an American author of horror fiction, urban fantasy, and adventure fiction. His work has been nominated for the Bram Stoker Award, The Shirley Jackson Award, the International Thriller Writers Award, and the Dragon Award.

== Early and personal life ==
Kaufmann was born in New York City to parents Lois G. Kaufmann (née Gordon), a medical receptionist, and John M. P. Kaufmann, a wholesale leather supplier. He spent much of his youth in Westport, Connecticut, where he attended Coleytown Elementary School until the sixth grade. Moving back to New York City, he attended and graduated from Columbia Grammar and Preparatory School, and went on to receive a B.A. from Sarah Lawrence College. He lives in Brooklyn, NY with his wife Alexa Antopol.

== Awards ==
- The Dragon Award nominee for 100 Fathoms Below
- The Bram Stoker Award nominee for General Slocum’s Gold
- The International Thriller Writers Award nominee for Chasing the Dragon
- The Shirley Jackson Award nominee for Chasing the Dragon

== Bibliography ==
- Novels
  - Hunt at World’s End (2009).
  - Dying Is My Business (2013)
  - Die and Stay Dead (2014)
  - In the Shadow of the Axe (2016)
  - 100 Fathoms Below co-written with Steven L. Kent (2018)
  - The Hungry Earth (2021)
  - The Stone Serpent (2022)
  - The Mind Worms (2024)
- Novellas
  - Chasing The Dragon (2010)
- Collections
  - Walk In Shadows: Collected Stories (2003)
  - Still Life: Nine Stories (2012)
  - Monuments In Darkness (2025)
- Chapbooks
  - General Slocum's Gold (2007)
- Anthologies
  - Jack Haringa Must Die!: Twenty-Eight Original Tales of Madness, Terror, and Strictly Grammatical Murder (2008)
