= Steven L. Kent =

American journalist and author

- Born: August 28, 1960 (age 66)
- Education: Brigham Young University (BA, MA)
- Occupation: Writer
- Parent: Ron Kent (father)
- Writing career
- Genre: Military science fiction

Steven L. Kent (born August 28, 1960) is an American writer, known for both video game journalism and military science fiction novels. He is the son of woodworker Ron Kent.

== Career ==
In 1993, Steven started work as a freelance journalist, writing monthly video game reviews for the Seattle Times. He eventually became a contributor to such video game publications as Electronic Games, Next Generation, and Computer Entertainment News, as well as such mainstream publications as Parade, USA Today, the Chicago Tribune, MSNBC, the Japan Times, and the Los Angeles Times Syndicate. He also wrote entries on video games for Encarta and the Encyclopedia Americana.

In 2005, Steve announced that he would concentrate on writing novels. In 2006, he published The Clone Republic and Rogue Clone. In 2007, he published The Clone Alliance.

Kent received a B.A. in 1986 and an M.A. in 1990, both from Brigham Young University.

== Bibliography ==
=== Science fiction ===
- The Clone Republic (March 2006)
- Rogue Clone (September 2006)
- The Clone Alliance (November 2007)
- The Clone Elite (October 2008)
- The Clone Betrayal (October 2009)
- The Clone Empire (October 2010)
- The Clone Redemption (October 2011)
- The Clone Sedition (October 2012)
- The Clone Assassin (October 2013)
- The Clone Apocalypse (December 2014)

=== Horror ===
- 100 Fathoms Below; co-written with Nicholas Kaufmann (2018)

=== Non-fiction ===
- Star Crusader (with Ed Dille, January 1995) - Prima Games
- Wing Commander III (April 1995) - Prima Games
- The Making of Final Fantasy: The Spirits Within (August 2001)
- The First Quarter: A 25-Year History of Video Games (September 2001) - BWD Press
- The Ultimate History of Video Games (October 2001) - Random House International/Three Rivers Press/Prima Lifestyles
- Star Wars: Galactic Battlegrounds (November 2001) - Prima Games
- The Making of Doom 3 (October 2004) - McGraw-Hill
- The Ultimate History of Video Games: Volume 2 (August 2021) - Random House International/Crown
