= Yamaha YMF292 =

Sound chip model

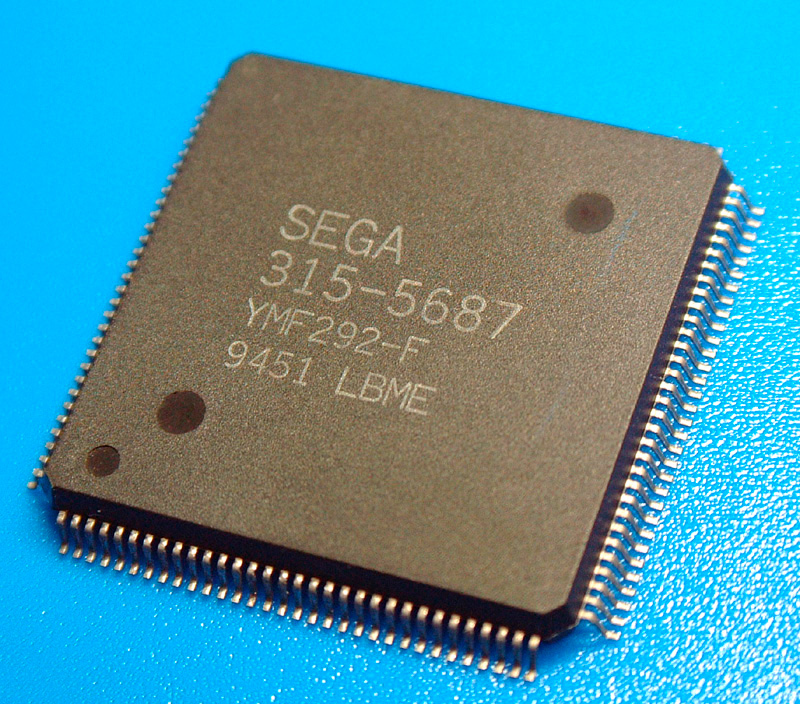
Yamaha YMF292-F

The YMF292-F, AKA SCSP (Sega Custom Sound Processor) is a multi-function sound chip developed by Yamaha for the Sega Saturn, and was also used in Sega's arcade version of the Saturn, the ST-V, along with the Model 2 and Model 3. The SCSP has a 22.58 MHz audio chip with 44.1 kHz playback and support for 8-bit and 16-bit waveform data.

For sound generation, the SCSP contains 32 sound generators which can function in either FM synthesis or PCM digital audio mode. The sound generation hardware is then fed into the FH-1 128-step sound effects Digital Signal Processor, which includes 16 sound effect presets. Each audio channel is mixed together with fully configurable channel combining for various levels of FM generation complexity. This allowed the channels to modulate each other, in practice four generators were connected at a time but all 32 generators could be combined into one channel if desired. The SCSP also included a 7-level interrupt controller.

The SCSP is generally controlled via a dedicated external processor; in the case of Sega hardware, a Motorola 68EC000 is used. Also included alongside is a RAM chip for storing digital audio data and sound programming, and an external DAC chip.

In comparison to the sound hardware in other video game systems of the time, the SCSP lacked any sort of hardware audio decompression.
