= Dreamcast =

Sega video game console

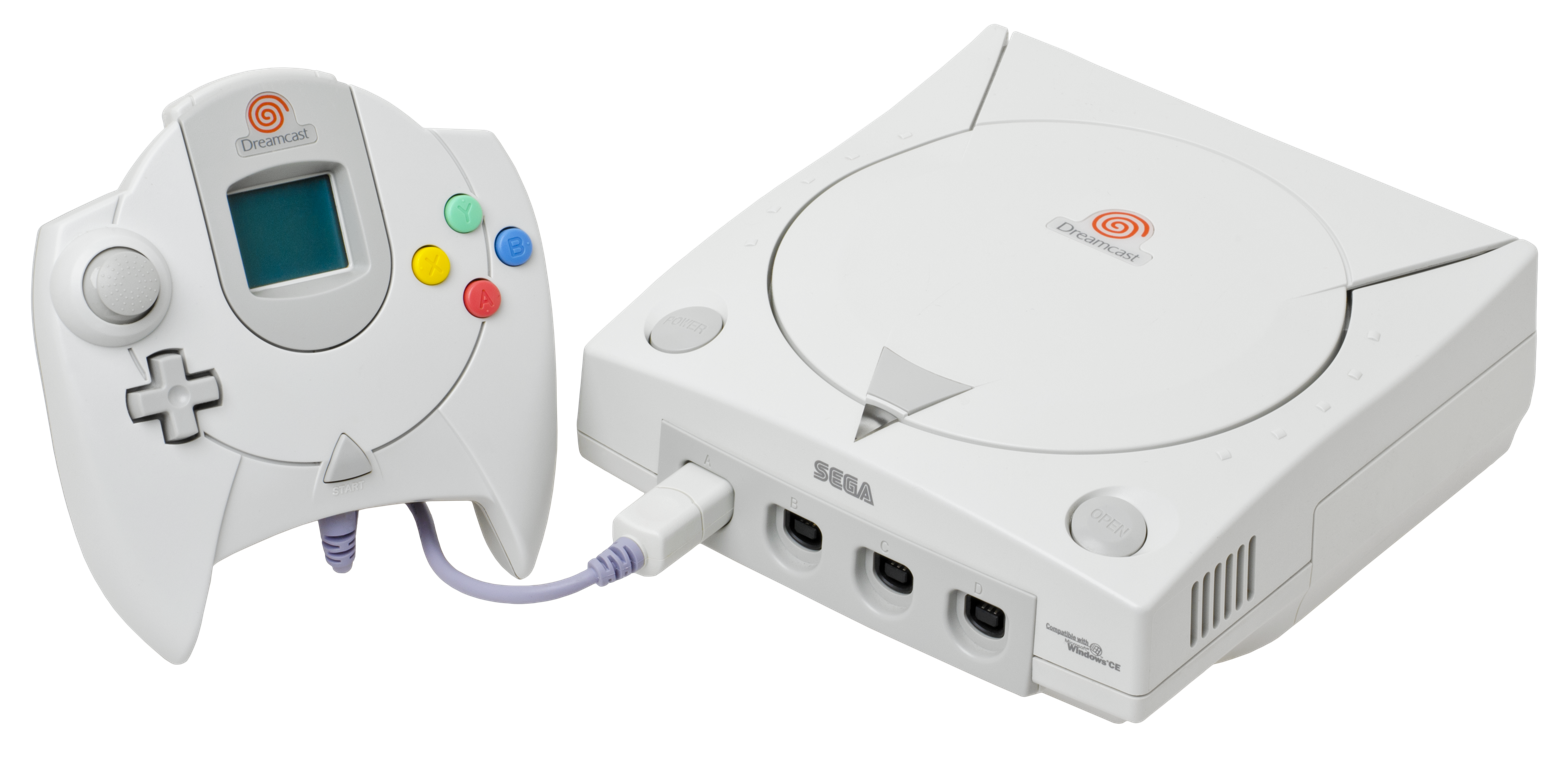
- North American Dreamcast with controller and VMU
- Manufacturer: Sega
- Type: Home video game console
- Generation: Sixth
- Released: JP: November 27, 1998; NA: September 9, 1999; EU: October 14, 1999; AU: November 30, 1999
- Introductory price: ¥29,000 (equivalent to ¥32,000 in 2024); US$199 (equivalent to $380 in 2025); £200 (equivalent to £380 in 2025)
- Discontinued: WW: March 31, 2001
- Units sold: 9.13 million
- Media: GD‑ROM, CD‑ROM
- CPU: Hitachi SH-4 @ 200 MHz
- Memory: 16 MB RAM; 8 MB video RAM; 2 MB audio RAM
- Removable storage: 128 KB VMU
- Display: Composite; RF modulator; SCART; S-video; VGA (via adaptor)
- Graphics: NEC PowerVR2 @ 100 MHz
- Sound: Yamaha AICA @ 67 MHz with ARM7 CPU, 64 channels
- Connectivity: Modem, broadband adapter (separate)
- Online services: Dricas; SegaNet; Dreamarena
- Dimensions: 195.8 × 190 × 75.5 mm (7.71 × 7.48 × 2.97 in)
- Weight: 1.5 kg (3.3 lb)
- Best-selling game: Sonic Adventure (2.5 million) (list)
- Predecessor: Sega Saturn

Alternative Dreamcast logo used in PAL territories

The Dreamcast (Note: Japanese: ドリームキャスト, Hepburn: Dorīmukyasuto) is the final home video game console manufactured by Sega. It was released in Japan on November 27, 1998, and worldwide in late 1999. It succeeded the Sega Saturn and was the first sixth-generation console, preceding Sony's PlayStation 2, Nintendo's GameCube, and Microsoft's Xbox.

A team led by Hideki Sato began developing the Dreamcast in 1997. In contrast to the expensive hardware of the unsuccessful Saturn, the Dreamcast was designed to reduce costs with off-the-shelf components, including a Hitachi SH-4 CPU and an NEC PowerVR2 GPU. The Dreamcast shared hardware with Sega's NAOMI system board, enabling authentic arcade game conversions. Sega used the GD-ROM disc format to avoid the expense of DVD licensing. Developers could use a custom version of Windows CE for easier PC game porting. The Dreamcast was the first console to include a built-in modular modem for internet access and online play.

Though its Japanese release was beset by supply problems, the Dreamcast had a successful US launch backed by a large marketing campaign. However, sales steadily declined as Sony built anticipation for the PlayStation 2. Dreamcast sales did not meet Sega's expectations, and attempts to renew interest through price cuts caused significant financial losses. After a change in leadership, Sega discontinued the Dreamcast on March 31, 2001, and restructured itself as a third-party developer. 9.13 million Dreamcasts were sold worldwide and over 600 games were produced. Sega subsequently ported many Dreamcast games to other platforms.

The Dreamcast's commercial failure has been attributed to several factors, including competition from the PlayStation 2, limited third-party support, and the earlier failures of the 32X and Saturn having tarnished Sega's reputation. In retrospect, reviewers have celebrated the Dreamcast as one of the greatest consoles. It is considered ahead of its time for pioneering concepts such as online play and downloadable content. Many Dreamcast games are regarded as innovative, including Sonic Adventure (1998), Crazy Taxi (1999), Shenmue (1999), Jet Set Radio (2000), and Phantasy Star Online (2000). The Dreamcast remains popular in the video game homebrew community, which has developed private servers to preserve its online functions and unofficial Dreamcast software.

== History ==
=== Background ===
In 1988, Sega released the Genesis (known as the Mega Drive in most countries outside North America), in the fourth generation of video game consoles. It became the most successful Sega console ever, at 30.75 million units sold. Its successor, the Saturn, was released in Japan in 1994. The Saturn is CD-ROM-based and has 2D and 3D graphics, but its complex dual-CPU architecture was more difficult to program than its chief competitor, the Sony PlayStation. Although the Saturn debuted before the PlayStation in Japan and the United States, its surprise US launch, four months ahead of schedule, was limited to four retailers due to a lack of supply, which "aggravated" other retailers. Developers also found it easier to program for the PlayStation, which caused a loss of support from these game developers. Losses on the Saturn contributed to financial problems for Sega, whose revenue had declined between 1992 and 1995 as part of an industry-wide slowdown.

Sega announced that Shoichiro Irimajiri would replace Tom Kalinske as chairman and CEO of Sega of America, while Bernie Stolar, a former executive at Sony Computer Entertainment of America, became Sega of America's executive vice president in charge of product development and third-party relations. After the 1996 launch of the Nintendo 64, sales of the Saturn and its software fell sharply. As of August 1997, Sony controlled 47 percent of the console market, Nintendo controlled 40 percent, and Sega controlled only 12 percent; neither price cuts nor high-profile games helped the Saturn.

I thought the Saturn was a mistake as far as hardware was concerned. The games were obviously terrific, but the hardware just wasn't there.

— Bernie Stolar, former president of Sega of America, in 2009

Hayao Nakayama resigned as president of Sega in January 1998 in favor of Irimajiri, and Stolar became CEO and president of Sega of America. Following five years of generally declining profits, in the fiscal year ending March 31, 1998, Sega suffered its first parent and consolidated financial losses since its 1988 listing on the Tokyo Stock Exchange, reporting a consolidated net loss of ¥35.6 billion (US$269.8 million). Shortly before announcing its financial losses, Sega announced the discontinuation of the Saturn in North America to prepare for the launch of its successor. This effectively left the Western market without Sega games for more than a year. Rumors about the upcoming Dreamcast—spread mainly by Sega—leaked to the public before the last Saturn games were released.

=== Development ===
As early as 1995, reports surfaced that Sega would collaborate with Lockheed Martin, The 3DO Company, Matsushita or Alliance Semiconductor to create a new graphics processing unit, which conflicting accounts said would be used for a 64-bit "Saturn 2" or an add-on peripheral. Dreamcast development was unrelated. Considering the Saturn's poor performance, Irimajiri looked beyond Sega's internal hardware development division to create a new console. In 1997, he enlisted IBM's Tatsuo Yamamoto to lead an eleven-person team to work on a secret project in the United States with the codename Blackbelt. Accounts vary on how an internal team led by Hideki Sato also began development on Dreamcast hardware; one account specifies that Sega tasked both teams, and another suggests that Sato was bothered by Irimajiri's choice to begin development externally and had his team start work. Sato and his group chose the Hitachi SH-4 processor architecture and the VideoLogic PowerVR2 graphics processor, manufactured by NEC, in the production of the mainboard. Initially known as Whitebelt, the project was later codenamed Dural, after the metallic female fighter from Sega's Virtua Fighter series.

Yamamoto's group opted to use 3dfx Voodoo 2 and Voodoo Banshee graphics processors alongside a Motorola PowerPC 603e central processing unit (CPU), but Sega management later asked them to also use the SH-4 chip. Both processors have been described as "off-the-shelf" components. According to Charles Bellfield, the former Sega of America vice president of communications and former NEC brand manager, presentations of games using the NEC solution showcased the performance and low cost delivered by the SH-4 and PowerVR architecture. He said that Sega's relationship with NEC, a Japanese company, likely also influenced the decision to use its hardware rather than the architecture developed in America. Stolar felt the US 3dfx version should have been used, but that "Japan wanted the Japanese version, and Japan won". As a result, 3dfx filed a lawsuit against Sega and NEC claiming breach of contract, which was settled out of court.

The choice to use the PowerVR architecture concerned Electronic Arts (EA), a longtime developer for Sega consoles. EA had invested in 3dfx but was unfamiliar with the selected architecture, which was reportedly less powerful. According to Shiro Hagiwara (a general manager at Sega's hardware division) and Ian Oliver (the managing director of the Sega subsidiary Cross Products), the SH-4 was chosen while still in development, following lengthy deliberation, as the only processor that "could adapt to deliver the 3D geometry calculation performance necessary". By February 1998, Sega had renamed the project Katana, after the Japanese sword, although certain hardware specifications such as random access memory (RAM) were not finalized.

Knowing the Saturn had been set back by its high production costs and complex hardware, Sega took a different approach with the Dreamcast. Like previous Sega consoles, the Dreamcast was designed around intelligent subsystems working in parallel, but the selections of hardware were closer to personal computers than video game consoles, reducing cost. It also enabled software development to begin before any development kits had been completed, as Sega informed developers that any game developed with a Pentium II 200 in mind would run on the console. According to Damien McFerran, "the motherboard was a masterpiece of clean, uncluttered design and compatibility".

The Chinese economist and future Sega.com CEO Brad Huang convinced the Sega chairman, Isao Okawa, to include a modem with every Dreamcast under opposition from Okawa's staff over the additional US$15 cost per unit. To account for rapid changes in home data delivery, Sega designed the modem to be modular.

Sega selected the GD-ROM (Gigabyte Disc) media format. Jointly developed by Sega and Yamaha, the GD-ROM could be mass-produced at a similar price to a normal CD-ROM, avoiding the greater expense of newer DVD-ROM technology.

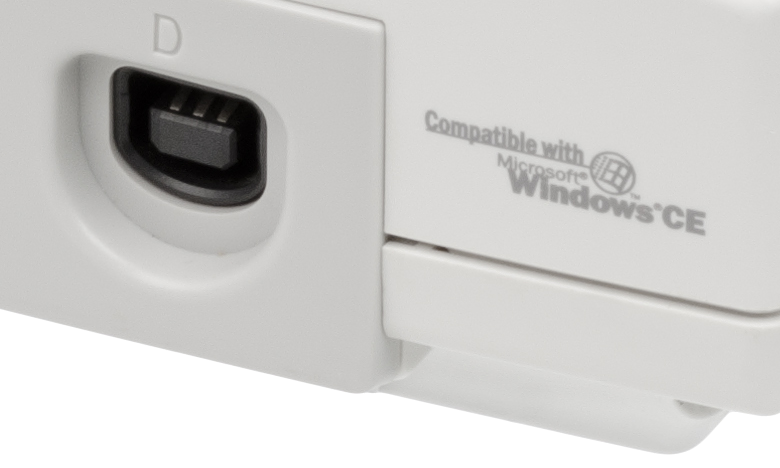
Logo on the Dreamcast: "Compatible with Windows CE"

Microsoft developed a custom Dreamcast version of Windows CE with DirectX API and dynamic-link libraries, making it easy to port PC games to the platform, although programmers would ultimately favor Sega's development tools over those from Microsoft. A member of the Project Katana team speaking anonymously predicted this would be the case, speculating developers would prefer the greater performance possibilities offered by the Sega OS to the more user-friendly interface of the Microsoft OS. According to former head of Microsoft's gaming division Ed Fries, "There was a way to reboot a Dreamcast into a Windows mode, believe it or not; virtually no one ever did it and there was almost no reason to do it, but that shipped". In late 1997, there were reports about the rumored system, then codenamed Dural, and that it had been demonstrated to a number of game developers.

The Dreamcast was finally revealed on May 21, 1998 in Tokyo. Sega held a public competition to name its new system and considered over 5,000 different entries before choosing "Dreamcast"—a portmanteau of "dream" and "broadcast". According to Katsutoshi Eguchi, Japanese game developer Kenji Eno submitted the name and created the Dreamcast's spiral logo, but this has not been officially confirmed by Sega. Former Sega executive Kunihisa Ueno confirmed in his biography that a branding agency called Interbrand created the logo for the console, with Kenji Eno volunteering to name the console. Eno was paid for his involvement and signed a NDA to prevent his involvement from going public.

The Dreamcast's startup sound was composed by the Japanese musician Ryuichi Sakamoto. Because the Saturn had tarnished its reputation, Sega planned to remove its name from the console and establish a new gaming brand similar to Sony's PlayStation, but Irimajiri's management team decided to retain it. Sega spent US$50–80 million on hardware development, $150–200 million on software development, and US$300 million on worldwide promotion—a sum which Irimajiri, a former Honda executive, humorously likened to the investments required to design new automobiles.

=== Launch ===
==== Japan ====
Despite a 75 percent drop in half-year profits just before the Japanese launch, Sega was confident about the Dreamcast. It drew significant interest and many pre-orders. However, Sega could not achieve its shipping goals for the Japanese Dreamcast launch due to a shortage of PowerVR chipsets caused by a high failure rate in the manufacturing process. As more than half of its limited stock had been pre-ordered, Sega stopped pre-orders in Japan. On November 27, 1998, the Dreamcast launched in Japan at a price of ¥29,000, and the stock sold out by the end of the day. However, of the four games available at launch, only one—a port of Virtua Fighter 3, the most successful arcade game Sega ever released in Japan—sold well. Sega estimated that an additional 200,000–300,000 Dreamcast units could have been sold with sufficient supply.

Sega had announced that Sonic Adventure, the next game starring its mascot, Sonic the Hedgehog, would launch with the Dreamcast and promoted it with a large-scale public demonstration at the Tokyo Kokusai Forum Hall, but it and Sega Rally Championship 2 were delayed. They arrived within the following weeks, but sales continued to be slower than expected. Irimajiri hoped to sell over one million Dreamcast units in Japan by February 1999, but sold fewer than 900,000, undermining Sega's attempts to build an installed base sufficient to protect the Dreamcast after the arrival of competition from other manufacturers. There were reports of disappointed Japanese consumers returning their Dreamcasts and using the refund to purchase additional PlayStation software. Seaman, released in July 1999, became the Dreamcast's first major hit in Japan. Prior to the Western launch, Sega reduced the price of the Dreamcast to ¥19,900, effectively making it unprofitable but increasing sales. The reduction and the release of Namco's Soulcalibur helped Sega gain 17 percent on its shares.

==== North America ====
Before the Dreamcast's release, Sega was dealt a blow when Electronic Arts, the largest third-party video game publisher at the time, announced it would not develop games for the system. EA's chief creative officer Bing Gordon said that Sega had "flip-flopped" on the hardware configuration, that EA developers did not want to work on it, and that Sega "was not acting like a competent hardware company". Gordon also said that Sega could not afford to give them the "kind of license that EA has had over the last five years". According to Stolar, president of EA at the time, Larry Probst, wanted exclusive rights as the only sports brand on Dreamcast, which Stolar could not accept due to Sega's recent US$10 million purchase of the sports game developer Visual Concepts. While EA's Madden NFL series had established brand power, Stolar regarded Visual Concepts' NFL 2K as superior and would provide "a breakthrough experience" to launch the Dreamcast. While none of EA's popular sports games were released for the Dreamcast, "Sega Sports" titles developed mainly by Visual Concepts helped to fill that void.

Let's take the conservative estimate of 250,000 Dreamcast units at presale—that's a quarter of a million units at $200. We'll have a ratio of 1.5 or two games for every Dreamcast unit sold. That's half a million units of software. We think we'll be .5 to one on VMUs and peripheral items such as extra controllers and what have you. This could be a $60 to 80 million 24-hour period. What has ever sold $60 to 80 million in the first 24 hours?

— Peter Moore, speaking to Electronic Gaming Monthly about the upcoming launch of the Dreamcast

Working closely with Midway Games (which developed four North American launch games for the system) and taking advantage of the ten months following the Dreamcast's release in Japan, Sega of America worked to ensure a more successful US launch with a minimum of 15 launch games. With lingering bitterness over the Saturn's early release, Stolar repaired relations with major US retailers, with whom Sega presold 300,000 Dreamcast units. In addition, a pre-launch promotion enabled consumers to rent Dreamcasts from Hollywood Video starting on July 14. Sega of America's senior vice president of marketing Peter Moore, a fan of the attitude previously associated with Sega's brand, worked with Foote, Cone & Belding and Access Communications to develop the "It's Thinking" campaign of 15-second television commercials, which emphasized the Dreamcast's hardware power. According to Moore: "We needed to create something that would really intrigue consumers, somewhat apologize for the past, but invoke [sic] all the things we loved about Sega, primarily from the Genesis days." On August 11, Sega of America confirmed that Stolar had been fired, leaving Moore to direct the launch.

The Dreamcast launched in North America on September 9, 1999, at a price of $199, which Sega's marketing dubbed "9/9/99 for $199". Nineteen launch games were available in the US. Sega set a new sales record by selling more than 225,132 Dreamcast units in 24 hours, earning $98.4 million in what Moore called "the biggest 24 hours in entertainment retail history". Within two weeks, US Dreamcast sales exceeded 500,000 units. By Christmas, Sega held 31 percent of the North American video game market share. Significant launch games included Sonic Adventure, the arcade fighting game Soulcalibur, and Visual Concepts' football simulation NFL 2K. On November 4, Sega announced it had sold over one million Dreamcast units in North America. The launch was marred by a glitch at one of Sega's manufacturing plants, which produced defective GD-ROMs.

==== Europe ====
Sega released the Dreamcast in Europe on October 14, 1999, at a price of £200. By November 24, 400,000 consoles had been sold in Europe. By Christmas of 1999, Sega of Europe had sold 500,000 units, six months ahead of schedule. The price was dropped to £149.99 from September 8, 2000, with sales at around 800,000 in Europe at this point. Announcing the drop, Jean-François Cecillon, CEO of Sega Europe, commented: "There are 'X' amount of core gamers in Europe; the early adopters. We have reached 80 or 90 per cent of them now and the market is screaming for a price reduction. We have to acknowledge these things and go with the market". Sales did not continue at this pace, and by October 2000, Sega had sold only about one million units in Europe. As part of Sega's promotions of the Dreamcast in Europe, it sponsored four European football clubs: Arsenal (England), Saint-Étienne (France), Sampdoria (Italy), and Deportivo de La Coruña (Spain). In Germany, Sega promoted the Dreamcast through television and cinema advertising, sports and music sponsorships, and a partnership with the music television channel VIVA. In a pre-launch interview with MAN!AC, Sega Germany managing director Thomas Zeitner described a European marketing budget in the tens of millions for the first six months, with television and print advertising intended to generate approximately 100 million advertising contacts. The campaign primarily targeted consumers aged 15 to 28.

==== Australia and New Zealand ====
Through the regional distributor Ozisoft, the Dreamcast went on sale in Australia and New Zealand on November 30, 1999, at a price of A$499. The launch was planned for September, but was delayed due to problems with internet compatibility and launch game availability, then delayed again from the revised date of October 25 for various reasons. (Note: Representatives from Ozisoft had different answers for the delay from October 25; one responded to IGN stating that they were awaiting approval from Telecom New Zealand for both the console and the Internet access disc. Another said, via ARN, that the delay was caused by high demand for international shipping along with chip manufacturing problems resulting from the then-recent earthquake in Taiwan; he also noted that Sega reallocated 50,000 Dreamcast units meant for the November 30 launch out of Australia due to heavy demand elsewhere.) There were severe problems at launch; besides a severe shortage of the consoles, only six of the thirty planned launch games were available for purchase on day one with no first-party software included, and additional peripherals were not available in stores.

The Ozisoft representative Steve O'Leary, in a statement released the day of launch, explained that the Australian Customs Service had impounded virtually all the supplied launch software, including demo discs, due to insufficient labeling of their country of origin; Ozisoft had received them only two days before launch, resulting in few games that were catalogued and prepared for shipment in time. O'Leary also said that the Dreamcast's high demand in other markets had reduced the number of peripherals allotted to the region. Further complicating matters was the lack of an internet disc due to localization problems, and delays in securing an internet service provider (ISP) contract, which was done through Telstra the day before launch. The online component was not ready until March 2000, at which point Ozisoft sent the necessary software to users who had sent in a filled-out reply paid card included with the console. The poor launch, combined with a lack of advertising and a high price point, produced lackluster sales in Australia; two large retail chains reported a combined total of 13 console sales over the first few days after launch.

=== Competition ===
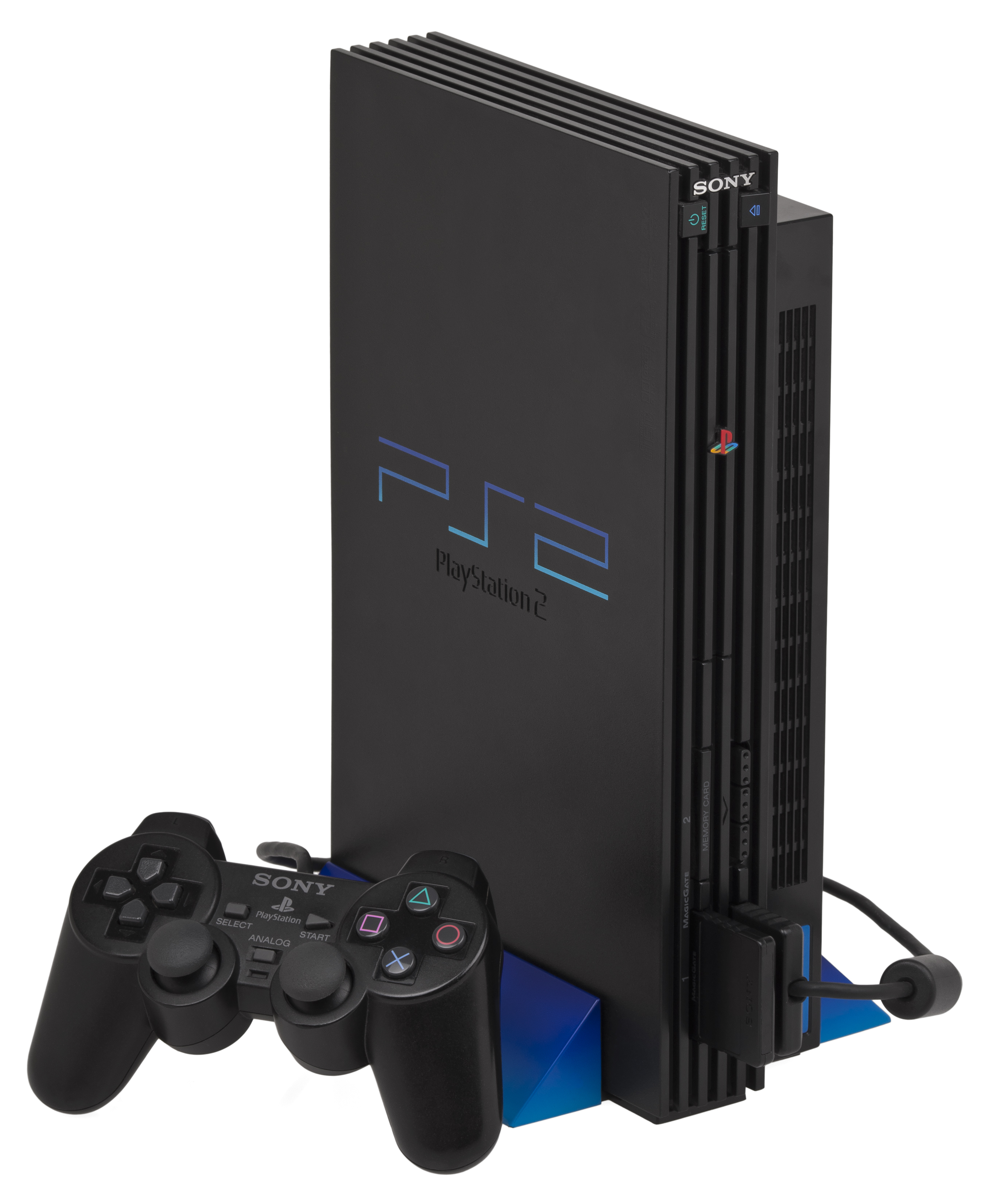
The PS2 provided tough competition for the Dreamcast.

Though the Dreamcast launch was successful, Sony held 60 percent of the overall video game market share in North America with the PlayStation at the end of 1999. On March 2, 1999, Sony revealed the first details of the PlayStation 2 (PS2), which Ken Kutaragi said would allow video games to convey unprecedented emotions. Sony estimated the PS2 could render 7.5 million to 16 million polygons per second, whereas independent estimates ranged from 3 million to 20 million, compared to Sega's estimates of more than 3 million to 6 million for the Dreamcast. The PS2 would also use the DVD-ROM format, which could hold substantially more data than the Dreamcast's GD-ROM, and would be backwards-compatible with hundreds of popular PlayStation games. Sony's specifications appeared to render the Dreamcast obsolete months before its US launch, although reports later emerged that the PS2 was not as powerful as expected and difficult to develop on. The same year, Nintendo announced that its next console, the GameCube, would meet or exceed anything on the market, and Microsoft began development of its own console, the Xbox.

US Dreamcast sales—which exceeded 1.5 million by the end of 1999—began to decline as early as January 2000. Poor Japanese sales contributed to Sega's ¥42.88 billion ($404 million) consolidated net loss in the fiscal year ending March 2000, which followed a loss of ¥42.881 billion the previous year and marked Sega's third consecutive annual loss. Although Sega's overall sales for the term increased 27.4%, and Dreamcast sales in North America and Europe greatly exceeded expectations, this coincided with a decrease in profitability due to the investments required to launch the Dreamcast in Western markets and poor software sales in Japan. At the same time, increasingly poor market conditions reduced the profitability of Sega's Japanese arcade business, prompting Sega to close 246 locations.

Moore became the president and chief operating officer of Sega of America on May 8, 2000. He and Sega's developers focused on the US market to prepare for the upcoming launch of the PS2. To that end, Sega of America launched its own internet service provider, Sega.com, led by CEO Brad Huang. On September 7, 2000, Sega.com launched SegaNet, the Dreamcast's internet gaming service, at a subscription price of $21.95 per month. Although Sega had previously released only one Dreamcast game in the US that featured online multiplayer, ChuChu Rocket!, the launch of SegaNet combined with the release of NFL 2K1, with a robust online component, was intended to increase demand for the Dreamcast in the US market. The service later supported games including Bomberman Online, Quake III Arena, and Unreal Tournament. The September 7 launch coincided with a new advertising campaign to promote SegaNet, including advertising on the MTV Video Music Awards that day, which Sega sponsored for the second consecutive year. Sega employed aggressive pricing strategies around online gaming; in Japan, every Dreamcast sold included a free year of internet access, which Okawa personally paid for. Prior to the launch of SegaNet, Sega had already offered a $200 rebate to any Dreamcast owner who purchased two years of internet access from Sega.com. To increase SegaNet's appeal in the US, Sega dropped the price of the Dreamcast to $149 (compared to the PS2's US launch price of $299) and offered a rebate for the full $149 price of a Dreamcast, and a free Dreamcast keyboard, with every 18-month SegaNet subscription.

=== Decline ===
Moore said that the Dreamcast would need to sell 5 million units in the US by the end of 2000 to remain a viable platform; Sega fell short of this goal, with some 3 million units sold. Moreover, Sega's attempts to spur increased Dreamcast sales through lower prices and cash rebates caused escalating financial losses. Instead of an expected profit, for the six months ending September 2000, Sega posted a ¥17.98 billion ($163.11 million) loss, with a projected year-end loss of ¥23.6 billion. This estimate more than doubled to ¥58.3 billion, and in March 2001, Sega posted a consolidated net loss of ¥51.7 billion ($417.5 million). While the PS2's October 26 US launch was marred by shortages, this did not benefit the Dreamcast as much as expected; many consumers continued to wait for a PS2, while the PSone, a remodeled version of the original PlayStation, became the bestselling console in the US at the start of the 2000 holiday season. According to Moore, "The PlayStation 2 effect that we were relying upon did not work for us... People will hang on for as long as possible... What effectively happened is the PlayStation 2 lack of availability froze the marketplace." Eventually, Sony and Nintendo held 50 and 35 percent of the US video game market, while Sega held only 15 percent. According to Bellfield, Dreamcast software sold at an 8-to-1 ratio with the hardware, but the small install base meant this did not produce enough revenue to keep it viable. During the course of 2000, the PlayStation had sold five times more than Dreamcast despite being five year old hardware.

We had a tremendous 18 months. Dreamcast was on fire - we really thought that we could do it. But then we had a target from Japan that said we had to make x hundreds of millions of dollars by the holiday season and shift x millions of units of hardware, otherwise, we just couldn't sustain the business. Somehow I got to make that call, not the Japanese. I had to fire a lot of people; it was not a pleasant day. So on January 31st 2001 we said Sega is leaving hardware. We were selling 50,000 units a day, then 60,000, then 100,000, but it was just not going to be enough to get the critical mass to take on the launch of PS2. It was a big stakes game. Sega had the option of pouring in more money and going bankrupt and they decided they wanted to live to fight another day.

— Peter Moore, on the Dreamcast's discontinuation

On May 22, 2000, Okawa replaced Irimajiri as president of Sega. Okawa had long advocated that Sega abandon the console business. His sentiments were not unique; Sega co-founder David Rosen had "always felt it was a bit of a folly for them to be limiting their potential to Sega hardware", and Stolar had suggested Sega should have sold their company to Microsoft. In September 2000, in a meeting with Sega's Japanese executives and the heads of the company's major Japanese game development studios, Moore and Bellfield recommended that Sega abandon its console business and focus on software, prompting the studio heads to walk out.

Amid speculation and rumors, Sega executives denied to the media that it would leave the console hardware business. Nevertheless, on January 31, 2001, Sega announced the discontinuation of the Dreamcast after March 31 and the restructuring of the company as a "platform-agnostic" third-party developer, although with continued Dreamcast software support for some time. Sega also announced a price reduction to $99 to eliminate its unsold inventory, which was estimated at 930,000 units as of April 2001. After a further reduction to $79, the Dreamcast was cleared out of stores at $49.95. The final Dreamcast unit manufactured was autographed by the heads of all nine of Sega's internal game development studios, plus the heads of Visual Concepts and Sega's sound studio Wave Master, and given away with all 55 first-party Dreamcast games through a competition organized by GamePro. Okawa, who had previously loaned Sega $500 million in 1999, died on March 16, 2001; shortly before his death, he forgave Sega's debts to him and returned his $695 million worth of Sega and CSK stock, helping Sega survive the transition to third-party development. As part of this restructuring, nearly one third of Sega's Tokyo workforce was laid off in 2001.

=== Aftermath and reaction ===
9.13 million Dreamcast units were sold worldwide. Despite the discontinuation of Dreamcast hardware, Sega continued to support the system and had stated that more than 30 new titles were confirmed for release for the remainder of 2001. In the United States, official game releases continued until the end of the first half of 2002. Sega continued to repair Dreamcast units until September 28, 2007. Many hardware developers that worked on the Dreamcast also joined pachinko and pachislot company Sammy Corporation, who soon merged with Sega. Hideki Sato pushed for leftover Dreamcast parts being used as displays in the machines that Sammy develops, including the very successful Fist of the North Star pachinko machines.

After five consecutive years of financial losses, Sega finally posted a profit for the fiscal year ending March 2003.

The announcement of Sega's exit from hardware was met with enthusiasm. According to IGN's Travis Fahs, "Sega was a creatively fertile company with a rapidly expanding stable of properties to draw from. It seemed like they were in a perfect position to start a new life as a developer/publisher." Former Working Designs president Victor Ireland wrote, "It's actually a good thing ... because now Sega will survive, doing what they do best: software." The staff of Newsweek wrote that "from Sonic to Shenmue, Sega's programmers have produced some of the most engaging experiences in the history of interactive media ... Unshackled by a struggling console platform, this platoon of world-class software developers can do what they do best for any machine on the market." Game Informer, commenting on Sega's tendency to produce under-appreciated cult classics, wrote: "Let us rejoice in the fact that Sega is making games equally among the current console crop, so that history will not repeat itself."

== Technical specifications ==
=== Hardware ===
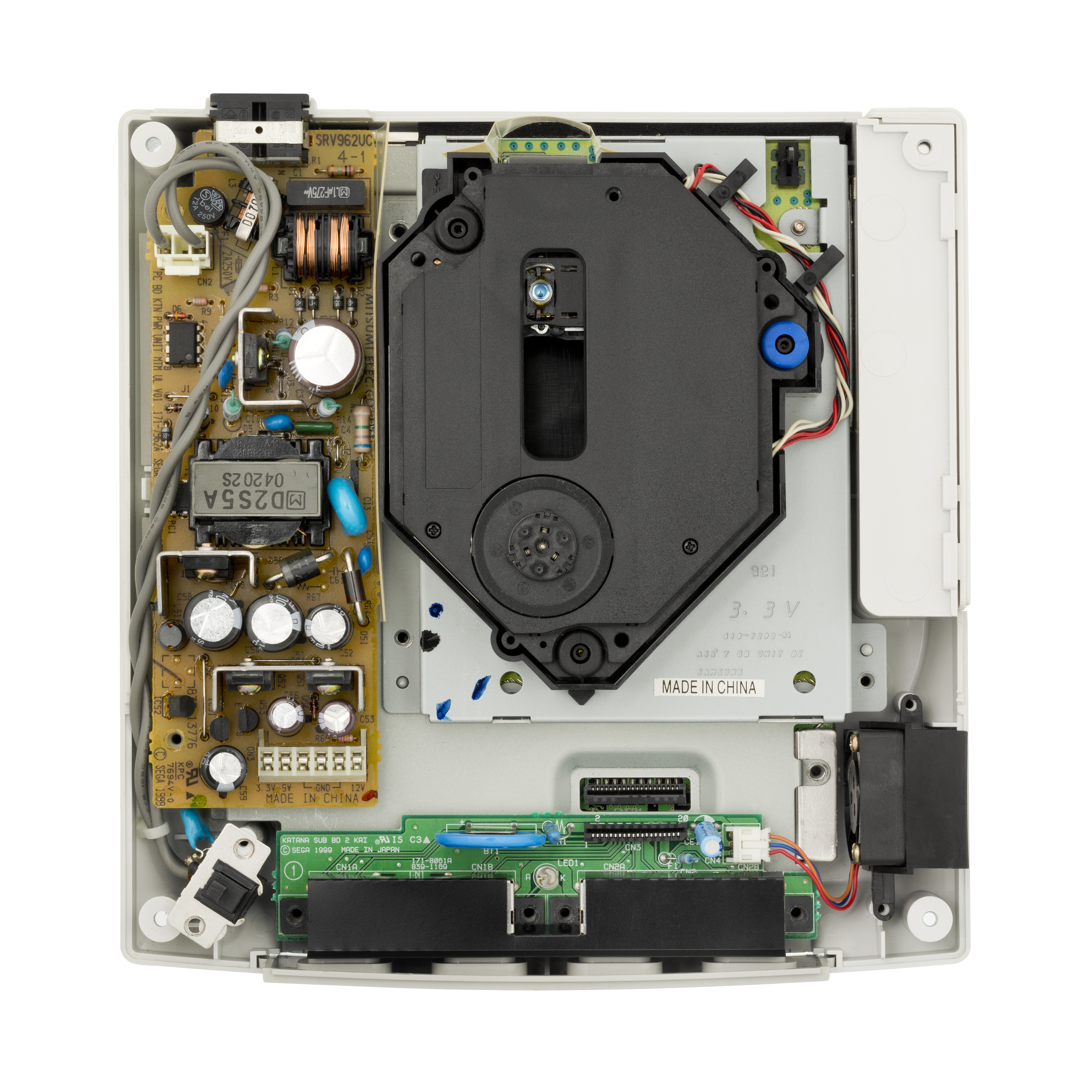
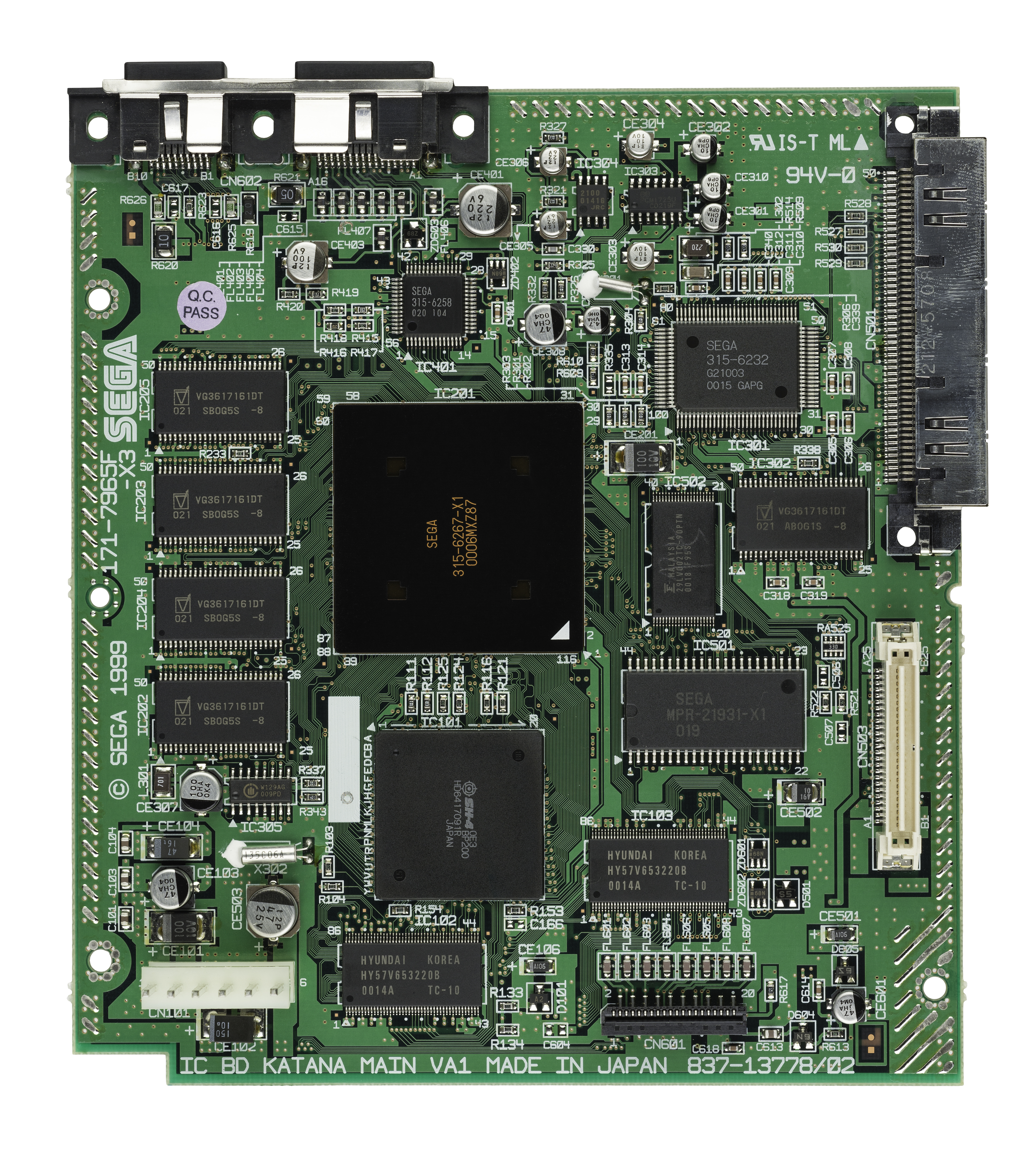
Internal view of a Dreamcast console including optical drive, power supply, controller ports, and cooling fan. Isolated motherboard.

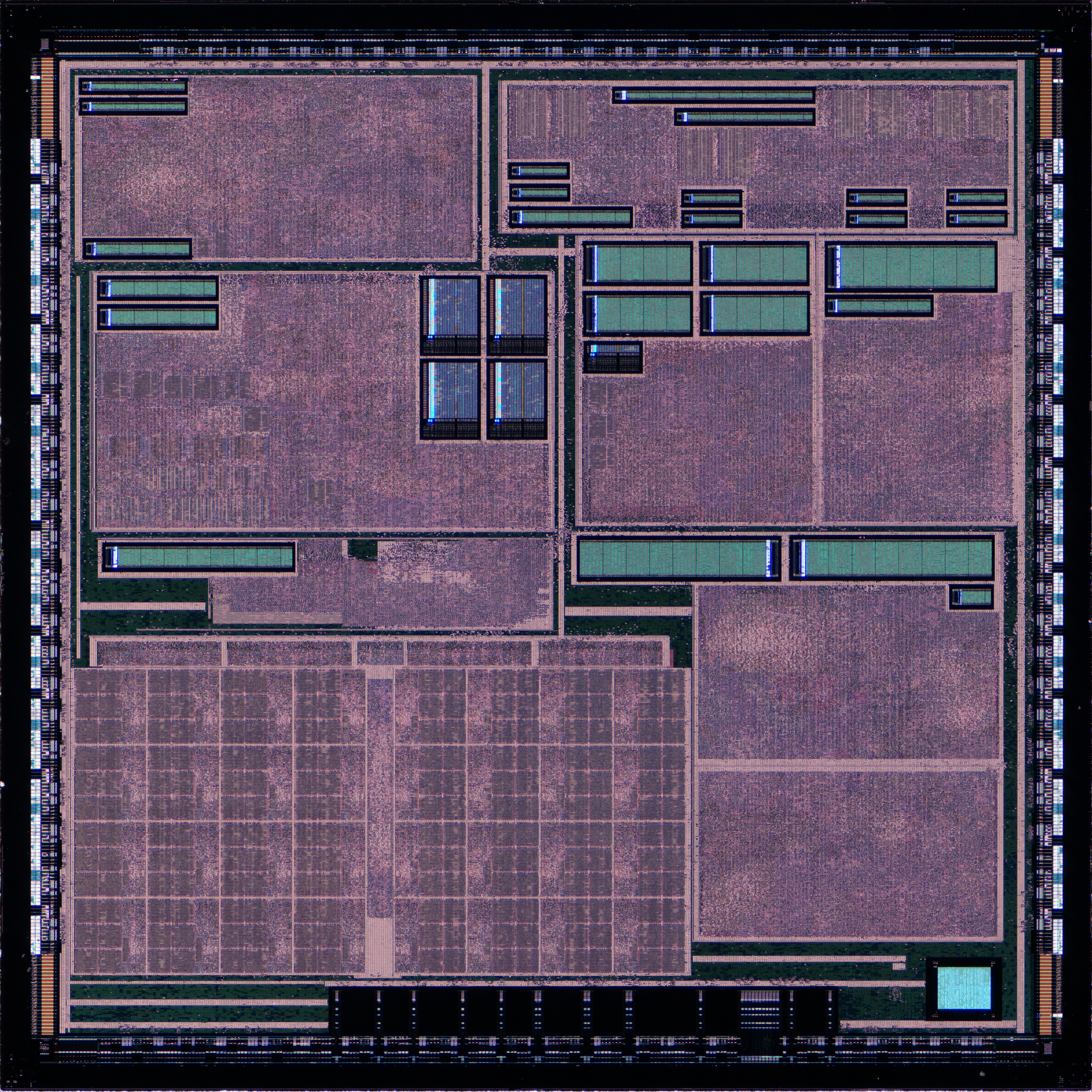
Die shot of the Dreamcast's ASIC

The Dreamcast measures 190 mm × 195.8 mm × 75.5 mm (7.48 in × 7.71 in × 2.97 in) and weighs 1.5 kg (3.3 lb). Its main CPU is a two-way 360 MIPS superscalar Hitachi SH-4 32-bit RISC, clocked at 200 MHz with an 8 kB instruction cache and 16 kB data cache and a 128-bit graphics-oriented floating-point unit delivering 1.4 GFLOPS. Its 100 MHz NEC PowerVR2 rendering engine, integrated with the ASIC, can draw more than 3 million polygons per second and use deferred shading. Sega estimated the Dreamcast's theoretical rendering capability at 7 million raw polygons per second, or 6 million with textures and lighting, but noted that "game logic and physics reduce peak graphic performance".

Graphical hardware effects include trilinear filtering, gouraud shading, z-buffering, spatial anti-aliasing, per-pixel translucency sorting and bump mapping. The Dreamcast can output approximately 16.77 million colors simultaneously and displays interlaced or progressive scan video at 640 × 480 video resolution. Its 67 MHz Yamaha AICA sound processor, with a 32-bit ARM7 RISC CPU core, can generate 64 voices with PCM or ADPCM, providing ten times the performance of the Saturn's sound system. The Dreamcast has 16 MB main RAM, along with an additional 8 MB of RAM for graphic textures and 2 MB of RAM for sound. It reads media using a 12× speed Yamaha GD-ROM drive. In addition to Windows CE, the Dreamcast supports several Sega and middleware application programming interfaces.

The Dreamcast can supply video through several accessories including A/V cables, RF modulator connectors S-Video cables and SCART. A VGA adapter allows Dreamcast to connect on computer displays or enhanced-definition television sets in 480p.

=== Models ===
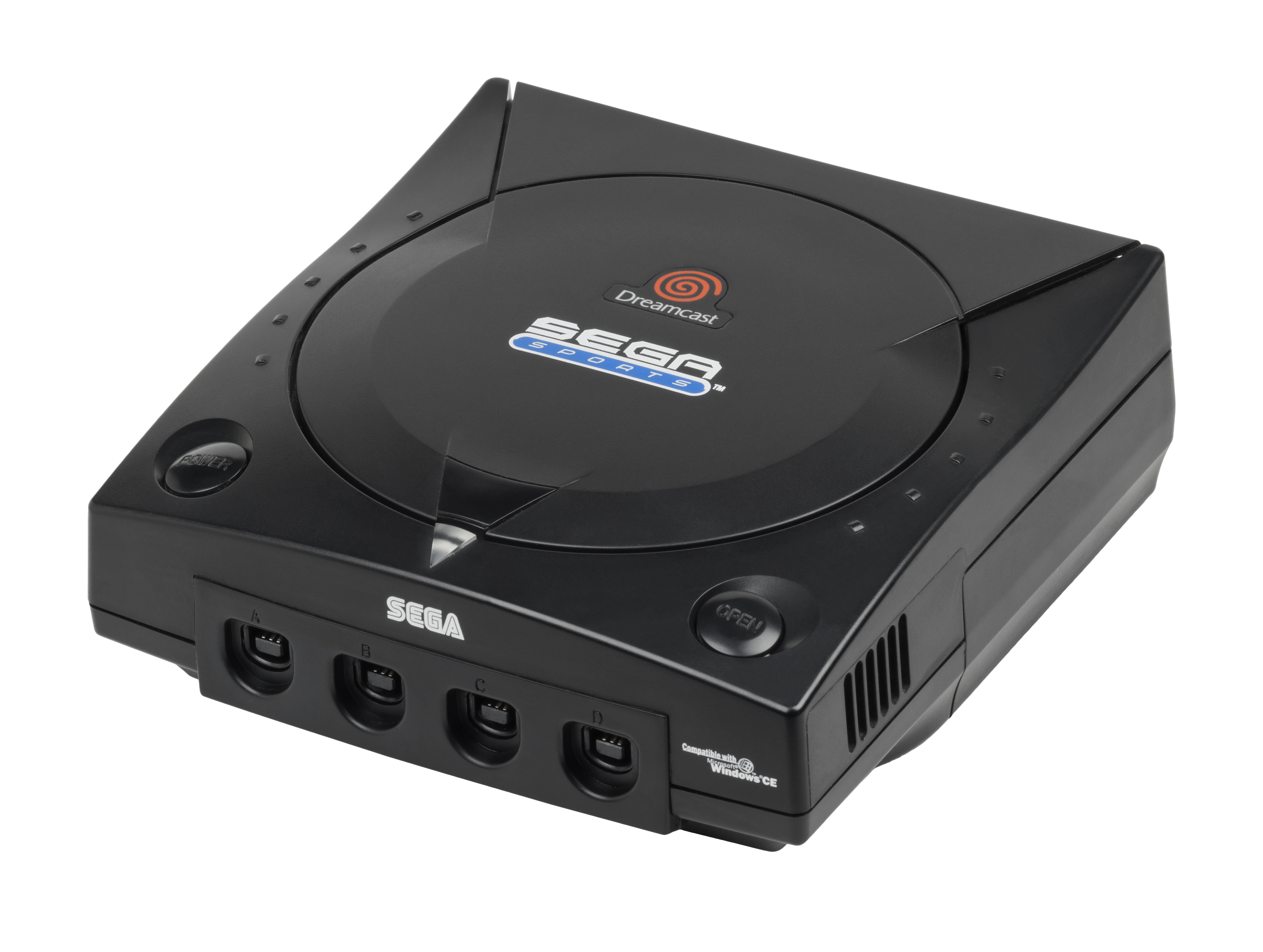
The limited-edition black "Sega Sports" model

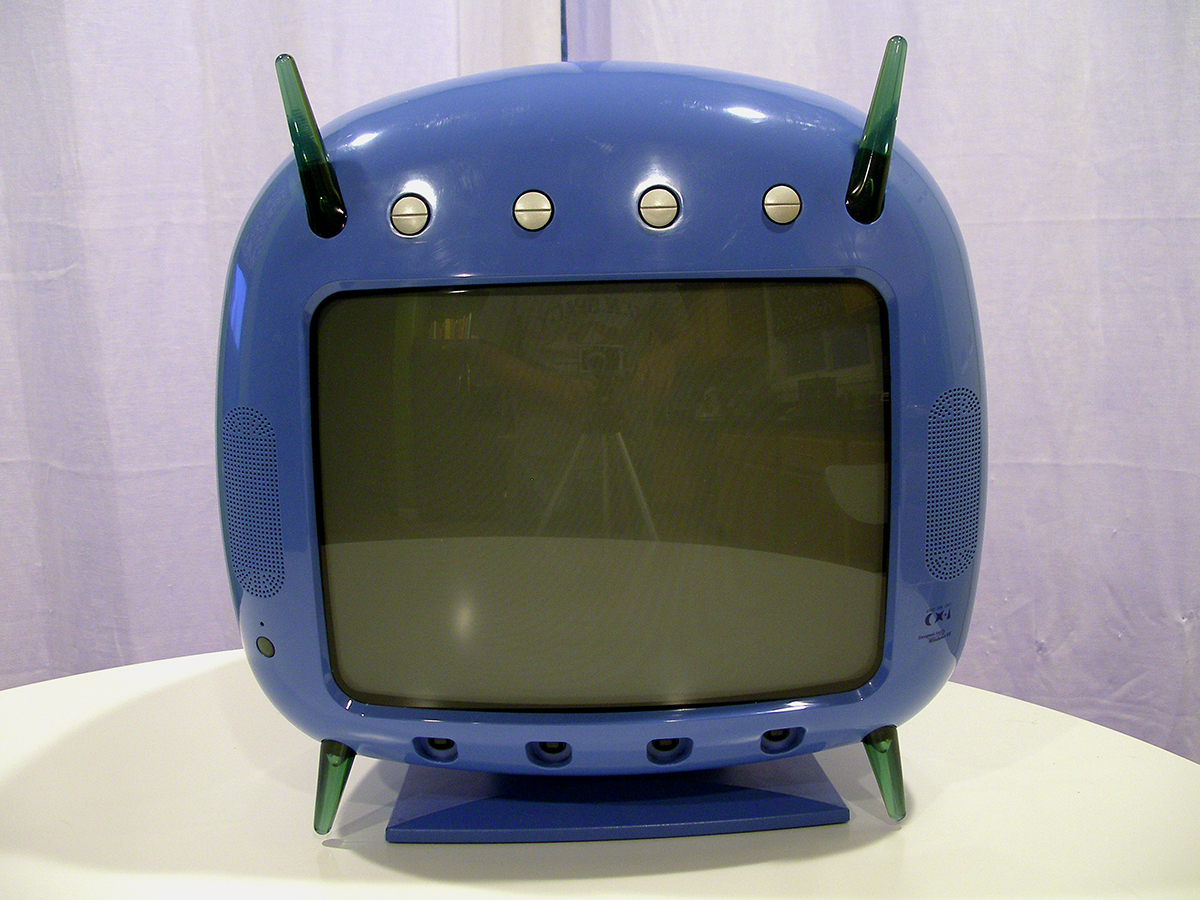
The Divers 2000 CX-1 is a special edition of the Dreamcast that was built into a television set.

Sega constructed numerous Dreamcast models, most of which were exclusive to Japan. The R7, a refurbished Dreamcast, was originally used as a network console in Japanese pachinko parlors. Another model, the Divers 2000 CX-1, is shaped similarly to Sonic's head and includes a television and software for teleconferencing. A Hello Kitty version, limited to 2000 units, was targeted at female gamers in Japan. Special editions were created for Seaman, Resident Evil – Code: Veronica, and the Sakura Wars series. The latter, marketed as the Sakura Wars Dreamcast for Internet, was released in Japan in December 2000 and featured a pink console with matching accessories, bundled with themed internet software and a promotional disc for Sakura Wars 3. Color variations were sold through the Dreamcast Direct service in Japan. Toyota also offered special Dreamcast units at 160 of its dealers in Japan. In North America, a limited edition black Dreamcast was released with a Sega Sports logo on the lid, which included matching Sega Sports-branded black controllers and NFL 2K and NBA 2K. Sega marketed the bundle as a way to introduce new Dreamcast owners to its sports franchises ahead of the release of their online-enabled sequels.

=== Controllers and accessories ===
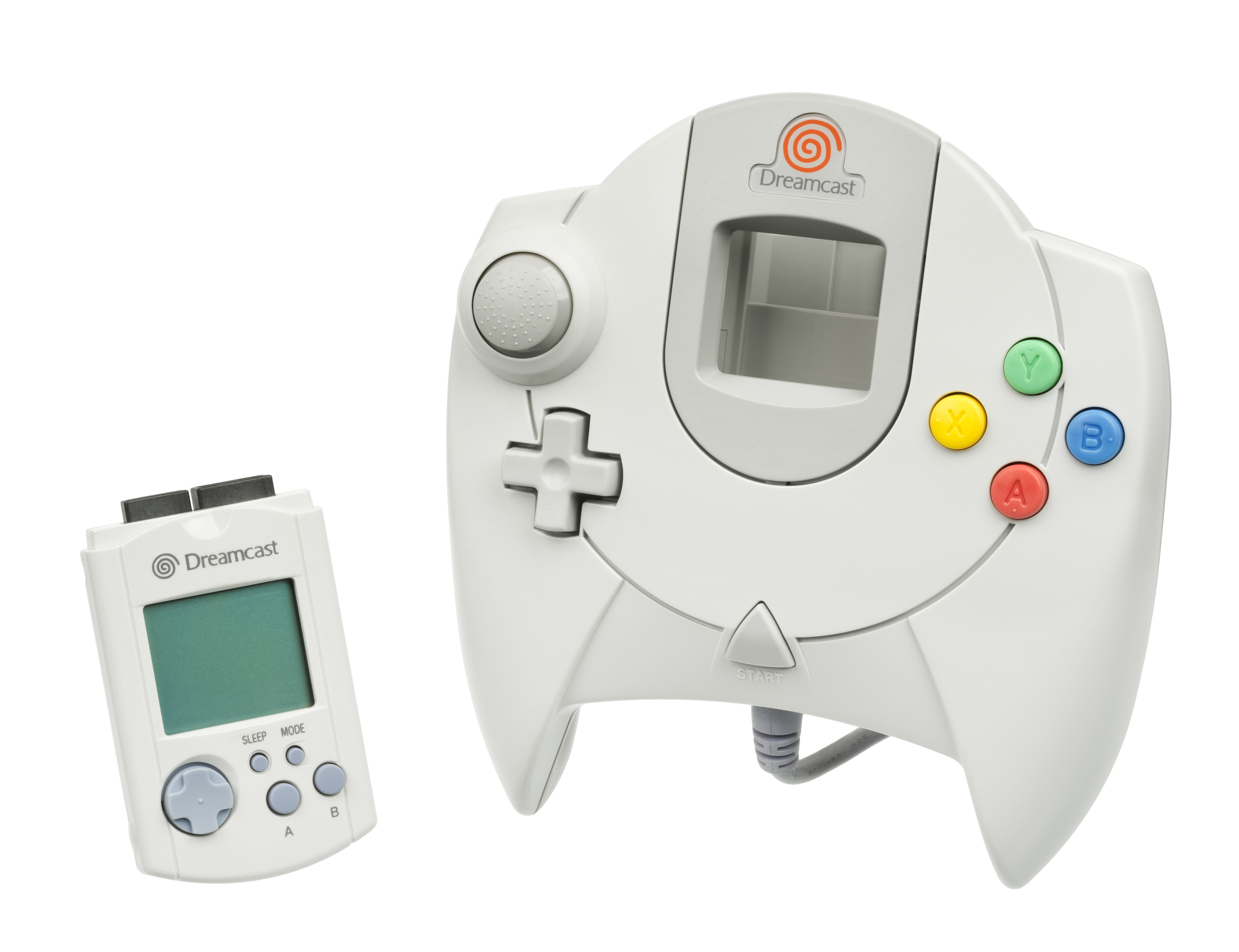
The Dreamcast controller has two dock connectors for use with multiple accessories, like the VMU.

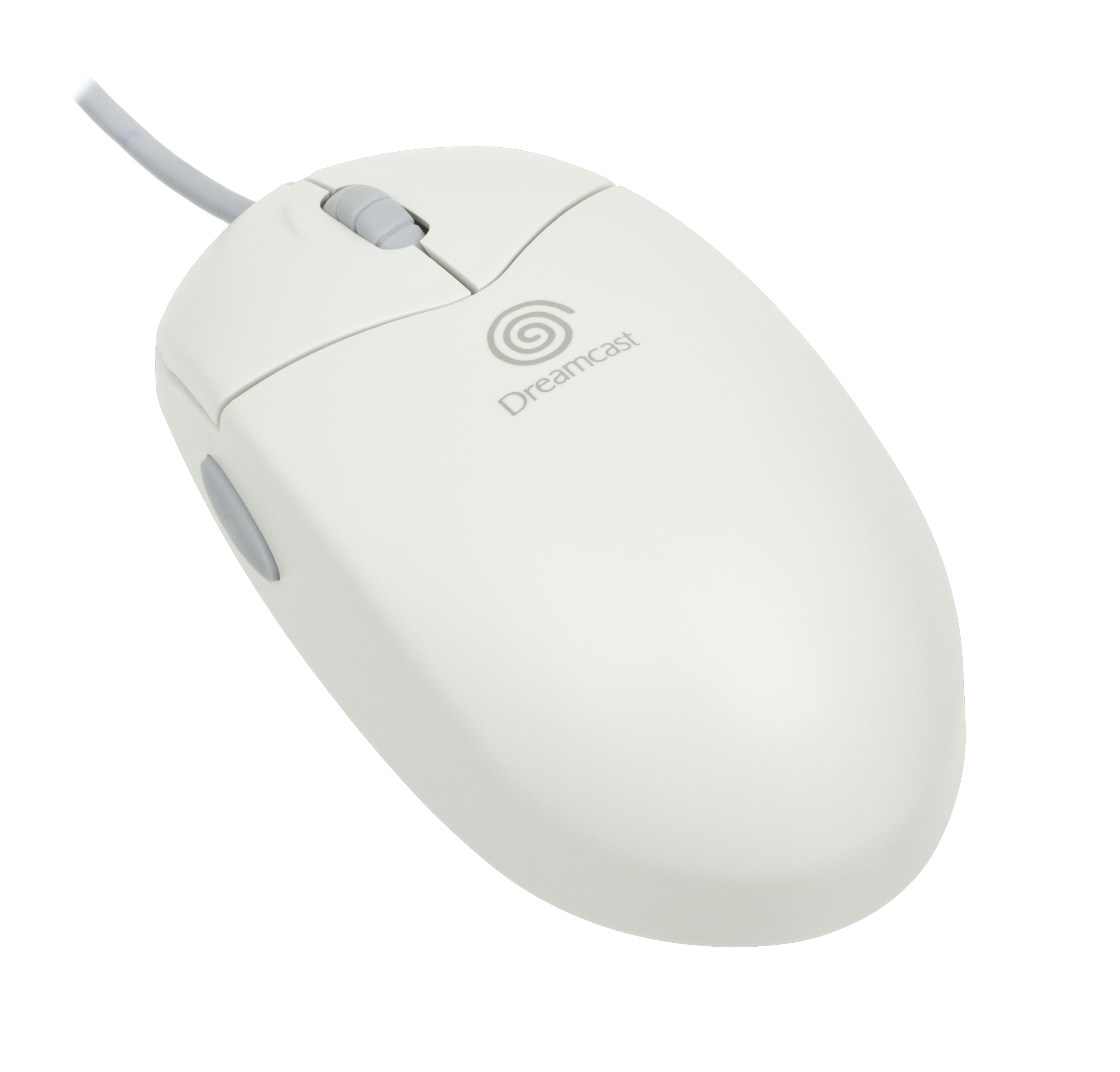
Dreamcast mouse accessory

The Dreamcast has four ports for controller inputs, and was sold with one controller. The controller is based on the Saturn 3D controller and includes an analog stick, a D-pad, four action buttons, start button and two analog triggers. It received mostly negative reviews from critics; Edge described it as "an ugly evolution of Saturn's 3D controller", and was called "[not] that great" by 1Up.com's Sam Kennedy and "lame" by Game Informer's Andy McNamara. IGN wrote that "unlike most controllers, Sega's pad forces the user's hands into an uncomfortable parallel position". Both the analog joystick and triggers uniquely used Hall-effect sensors, which require less calibration and lead to fewer issues with joystick drift.

Various third-party controllers, from companies such as Mad Catz, include additional buttons and other features; third parties also manufactured arcade-style joysticks for fighting games, such as Agetech's Arcade Stick and Interact's Alloy Arcade Stick. Mad Catz and Agetec created racing wheels for racing games. Sega did not release its official light guns in the US, but some third party light guns were available. The Dreamcast supports a Sega fishing "reel and rod" motion controller and a keyboard for text entry. Although it was designed for fishing games such as Sega Bass Fishing, Soulcalibur is playable with the fishing controller, which translates vertical and horizontal movements into on-screen swordplay; IGN cited it as a predecessor to the Wii Remote. The Japanese Dreamcast port of Sega's Cyber Troopers Virtual-On Oratorio Tangram supported a "Twin Sticks" peripheral, but its American publisher, Activision, opted not to release it in the US. The Dreamcast can connect to SNK's Neo Geo Pocket Color, predating Nintendo's GameCube – Game Boy Advance link cable.

In most regions, the Dreamcast includes a removable modem for online connectivity, which is modular for future upgrades. In Brazil, due to the high price of the console, the modem was sold separately. The original Japanese model and all PAL models have a transfer rate of 33.6 kbit/s, and consoles sold in the US and in Japan after September 9, 1999, feature a 56 kbit/s dial-up modem. Broadband service was enabled through the later release of a broadband accessory in 2000 in Japan, and early 2001 in the US.

Sega also produced the Dreameye, a digital camera that could be connected to the Dreamcast and used to exchange pictures and participate in video chat over the internet. Sega hoped developers would use the Dreameye for future software, as some later did with Sony's similar EyeToy peripheral. In addition, Sega investigated systems that would have allowed users to make telephone calls with the Dreamcast, and discussed with Motorola the development of an internet-enabled cell phone that would use technology from the console to enable quick downloads of games and other data.

=== Storage ===
In contrast to the Sega CD and Sega Saturn, which included internal backup memory, the Dreamcast uses a 128 kilobyte memory card, the VMU, for data storage. The VMU features a small LCD screen, audio output from a one-channel PWM sound source, non-volatile memory, a D-pad and four buttons. The VMU can present game information, be used as a minimal handheld gaming device, and connect to certain Sega arcade machines. For example, players use the VMU to call plays in NFL 2K or raise virtual pets in Sonic Adventure.

Sega officials noted that the VMU could be used "as a private viewing area, the absence of which has prevented effective implementation of many types of games in the past". After a VMU slot was incorporated into the controller's design, Sega's engineers found many additional uses for it, so a second slot was added. It is generally for vibration packs providing force feedback, such as Sega's "Jump Pack" and Performance's "Tremor Pack"; it can be used for peripherals including a microphone, enabling voice control and player communication. Various third-party cards provide storage, and some contain the LCD screen addition. Iomega announced a Dreamcast-compatible zip drive storing up to 100 MB on removable discs, but it was never released.

== Software ==
=== Game library ===
The Dreamcast library consists of over 600 games across all regions, in GD-ROM format. It uses regional lockout, only playing games released within its predetermined region; however, this is circumventable via modchip installation, boot discs, or cheat discs such as Datel's Action Replay. In Japan, the Dreamcast was launched with Virtua Fighter 3tb, Pen Pen TriIcelon, Godzilla Generations, and July. In North America, it launched with 19 games, including the highly anticipated Sonic Adventure, Soulcalibur, and NFL 2K. (Note: The full list of North American launch games includes AeroWings, Airforce Delta, Blue Stinger, Expendable, Flag to Flag, The House of the Dead 2, Hydro Thunder, Monaco Grand Prix, Mortal Kombat Gold, NFL 2K, NFL Blitz 2000, Pen Pen TriIcelon, Power Stone, Ready 2 Rumble Boxing, Sonic Adventure, Soulcalibur, TNN Motorsports Hardcore Heat, Tokyo Xtreme Racer, and TrickStyle.) In Europe, it was planned to launch with 10 games; this increased to 15 after the launch was delayed. (Note: The full list of European launch games includes Blue Stinger, Dynamite Cop, Incoming, Millennium Soldier: Expendable, Monaco Grand Prix, Pen Pen TriIcelon, Power Stone, Ready 2 Rumble Boxing, Sega Rally 2, Sonic Adventure, Speed Devils, TrickStyle, Tokyo Highway Challenge, Toy Commander, and Virtua Fighter 3 tb.) Licensed Dreamcast games were released until mid-2002 in the US. Some indie developers continued to release games, such as 2007's Last Hope, developed by the German studio NG:Dev.Team.

==== First-party games ====
Sonic Adventure is a significant Dreamcast game, as the first 3D platforming Sonic game.

In what has been called "a brief moment of remarkable creativity", in 2000, Sega restructured its arcade and console development teams into nine semi-autonomous studios headed by their top designers. Studios included United Game Artists (UGA), Hitmaker, Smilebit, Overworks, WOW Entertainment, Amusement Vision, Sega Rosso, Wave Master, and Sonic Team, while Sega AM2 had been taken over earlier in the year by CSK Research Institute and became independent in 2001 as SEGA-AM2 Co., Ltd. Sega's design studios were encouraged to experiment and benefited from a relatively lax approval process. This resulted in games such as UGA's Rez, an attempt to simulate synaesthesia in the form of a rail shooter; Wow's The Typing of the Dead, a version of The House of the Dead 2 remade into a touch typing trainer; and Hitmaker's Segagaga, a Japan-exclusive role-playing game in which players are tasked with preventing Sega from going out of business.

Sonic Team's Sonic Adventure, the first fully 3D platform game starring Sega's mascot Sonic the Hedgehog, was considered the "centerpiece" of the Dreamcast launch. At 2.5 million copies, it is the best-selling Dreamcast game. Sonic Team also developed the Dreamcast's first online game—ChuChu Rocket!—which was praised for its addictive puzzle gameplay and "frantic" multiplayer matches, and the critically successful music game Samba de Amigo, which was noted for its expensive maracas peripheral and colorful aesthetic. Sonic Team's Phantasy Star Online, the first online console RPG, is considered a landmark game for refining and simplifying Diablo's style of gameplay to appeal to console audiences.

UGA created the music game Space Channel 5 for a female casual audience; players help a female outer-space news reporter, Ulala, fight aliens with "groove energy" by dancing. Hitmaker's arcade ports include Crazy Taxi, an open-world arcade racing game known for its addictive gameplay with more than one million copies sold; and Virtua Tennis, which revitalized the tennis game genre. Smilebit's Jet Set Radio, in which players control a Tokyo gang of rebellious inline skaters, is cited as a major example of Sega's commitment to original concepts during the Dreamcast's lifespan. Jet Set Radio also popularized cel shaded graphics, though it failed to meet Sega's sales expectations. The role-playing game Skies of Arcadia, developed by Overworks and produced by Rieko Kodama, was acclaimed for its surreal Jules Verne-inspired fantasy world of floating islands and sky pirates, charming protagonists, exciting airship battles and memorable plot.

AM2 developed what Sega hoped would be the Dreamcast's killer app, Shenmue, a "revenge epic in the tradition of Chinese cinema", with a level of detail considered unprecedented for a video game. Incorporating a simulated day-and-night cycle with variable weather, non-player characters with regular schedules, the ability to pick up and examine detailed objects, and introducing the quick-time event in its modern form, Shenmue went over budget and was rumored to have cost Sega over $50 million. According to Moore, Shenmue sold "extremely well", but had no chance of making a profit due to the Dreamcast's limited installed base.

Visual Concepts' NFL 2K football series and its NBA 2K basketball series were critically acclaimed. NFL 2K was considered an outstanding launch game for its high-quality visuals and "insightful, context-friendly, and, yes, even funny commentary", while NFL 2K1 featured groundbreaking online multiplayer earlier than its chief competitor, EA's Madden NFL series. Madden and 2K continued to compete on other platforms through 2004, with the 2K series introducing innovations such as a first person perspective new to the genre, and eventually launching ESPN NFL 2K5 at the aggressively low price point of $19.95 until EA signed an exclusive agreement with the National Football League, effectively putting every other pro-football game out of business. After Sega sold Visual Concepts for $24 million in 2005, the NBA 2K series continued with publisher Take-Two Interactive. During the Dreamcast's lifespan, Visual Concepts also collaborated with the Sonic the Hedgehog level designer Hirokazu Yasuhara on the action-adventure game Floigan Bros. and developed the action game Ooga Booga.

==== Ports and third-party games ====
Before the launch of the Dreamcast in Japan, Sega announced its NAOMI arcade board, a cheaper alternative to the Sega Model 3. NAOMI shares the same technology as the Dreamcast, with twice as much system, video, and audio memory and a 160 MB flash ROM board in place of a GD-ROM drive, allowing nearly identical home conversions of arcade games. Games were ported from NAOMI to the Dreamcast by several leading Japanese arcade companies, including Capcom and Namco. The Dreamcast also used parts similar to those found in personal computers with Pentium II and III processors, allowing a handful of ports of PC games.

To appeal to the European market, Sega formed a French affiliate, No Cliché, which developed games such as Toy Commander. Sega Europe also approached Bizarre Creations to develop the racing game Metropolis Street Racer. Although Acclaim, SNK, Ubisoft, Midway, Activision, Infogrames, and Capcom supported the Dreamcast during its first year, third-party support proved difficult to obtain due to the failure of the Sega Saturn and the profitability of publishing for the PlayStation. Namco's Soulcalibur, for example, was released for the Dreamcast because of the relative unpopularity of the Soul series at the time; Namco's more successful Tekken franchise was associated with the PlayStation console and PlayStation-based arcade boards. Capcom produced a number of fighting games for the Dreamcast, including the Power Stone series, and a temporarily exclusive entry in the popular Resident Evil series, Resident Evil – Code: Veronica. The Dreamcast is known for several shoot 'em ups, most notably Treasure's Bangai-O and Ikaruga. Sega also revived franchises from the Genesis era, such as Appaloosa Interactive's Ecco the Dolphin.

=== Network services ===
Dricas was an internet service for Dreamcast consoles in Japan. The service launched the week of October 28, 1998, with its feature set expanded in the weeks preceding the Dreamcast's launch in Japan on November 27, 1998. Much of its infrastructure was developed by ISAO Corporation, which was spun-off from Sega on November 26, 1999. Its accompanying web browser, Dream Passport, provided the ability to connect via dial-up, browse the internet, receive and send e-mail, and chat with other users. Dricas persisted until March 7, 2000, when the service was consolidated into ISAO's multi-platform online service, isao.net. Isao.net maintained online services and game servers for the Dreamcast until Sega ceased operation of the online servers for Phantasy Star Online, along with its GameCube port, on March 31, 2007.

SegaNet was an internet service for dial-up-based online gaming on the Dreamcast in the United States. The service was created by Sega in collaboration with GTE through its GTE internetworking division, later renamed Genuity. Sega announced a partnership with AT&T on August 4, 1999, making the AT&T WorldNet service the preferred ISP for Dreamcast in the United States, and an agreement making Excite@Home as the exclusive portal partner for SegaNet. Microsoft participated somewhat in the development of the service, but they terminated their relationship with Sega just a few months before its launch over differences in its direction. SegaNet launched on September 7, 2000, and originally offered a rebate for a free Dreamcast and keyboard with a two-year contract. Because of the Dreamcast's discontinuation, Sega announced they would discontinue the service on July 20, 2001, less than 11 months after launch. Online support for Dreamcast games via SegaNet continued until 2003.

Dreamarena was a free dial-up-based online gaming service provided for Dreamcast consoles in Europe, launching with the debut of the Dreamcast in Europe on October 14, 1999. The service was created and operated for Sega Europe by a partnership between ICL, BT and various ISPs. The service was accessed via the DreamKey browser, which was also built into some games such as Sonic Adventure 2. After the discontinuation of the Dreamcast, Sega closed Dreamarena on February 28, 2002.

== Reception and legacy ==
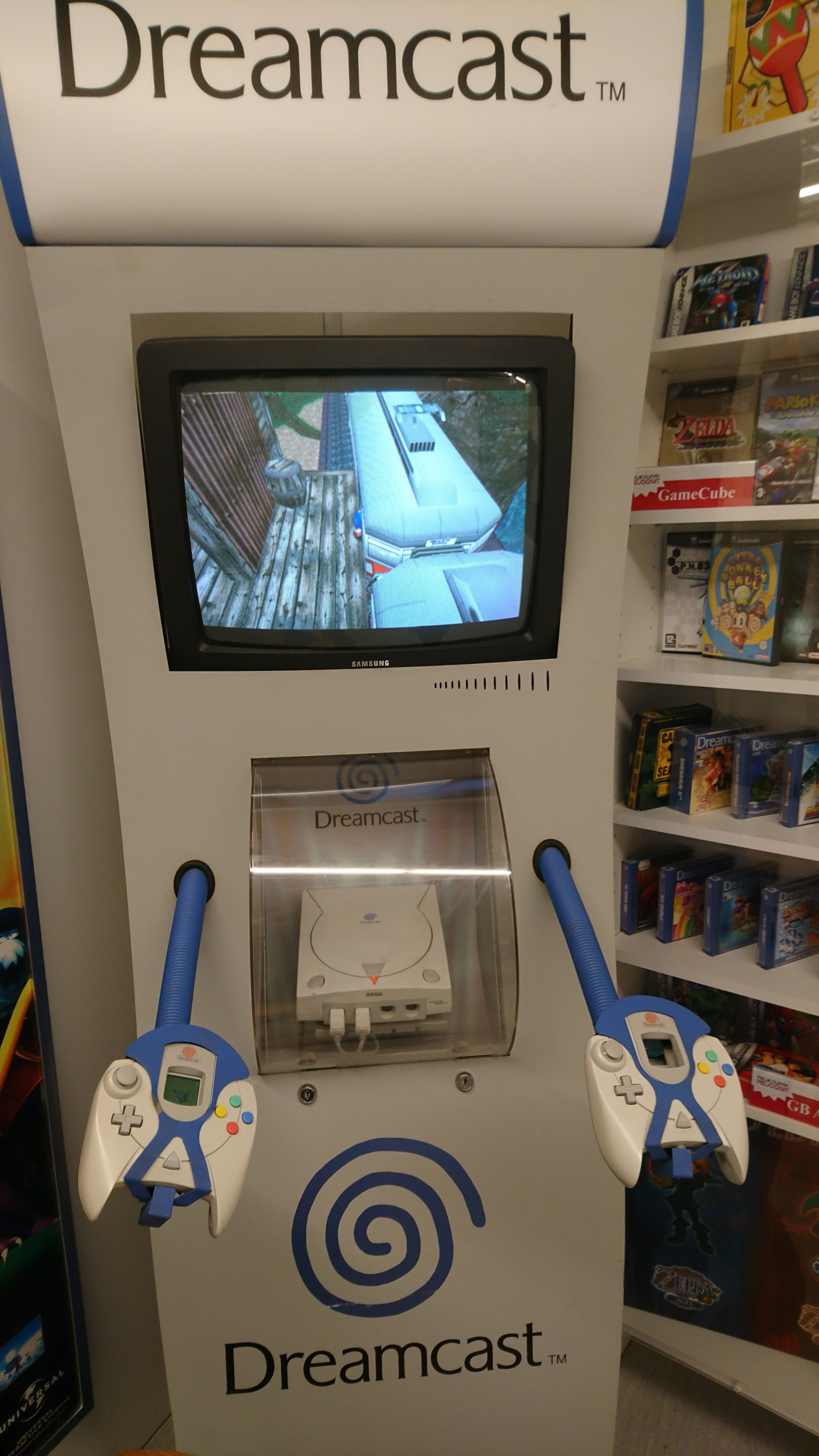
A Dreamcast European retail demo kiosk is at the Finnish Museum of Games in Tampere, Finland. The video game seen on the screen is Sonic Adventure, where Sonic is in Mystic Ruins.

In December 1999, Next Generation rated the Dreamcast four out of five, writing: "If you want the most powerful system available now, showcasing the best graphics at a reasonable price, this system is for you." However, Next Generation gave its future prognosis three out of five, noting that Sony and Nintendo were both due to release more powerful consoles. At the beginning of 2000, five Electronic Gaming Monthly reviewers scored the Dreamcast 8.5, 8.5, 8.5, 8.0, and 9.0 out of 10. In 2001, the Electronic Gaming Monthly reviewers scored it 9.0, 9.0, 9.0, 9.0, and 9.5 out of 10. BusinessWeek named the Dreamcast one of the best products of 1999.

Reasons cited for the failure of the Dreamcast include consumer excitement for the PS2; a lack of support from EA and Squaresoft, the most popular third parties in the US and Japan respectively; disagreement among executives over Sega's future, and Okawa's lack of commitment to the product; Sega's lack of advertising money, with Bellfield doubting that Sega spent even "half" the $100 million it had pledged to promote the Dreamcast in the US; that the market was not ready for online gaming; Sega's focus on "hardcore" gamers over mainstream consumers; poor timing; and damage to Sega's reputation caused by its several poorly supported previous platforms. In GamePro, Blake Snow wrote of "the much beloved [Dreamcast] launched years ahead of the competition but ultimately struggled to shed the negative reputation [Sega] had gained during the Saturn, Sega 32X, and Sega CD days. As a result, casual gamers and jaded third-party developers doubted Sega's ability to deliver."

Eurogamer's Dan Whitehead noted that consumers' "wait-and-see" approach, and the lack of support from EA, were symptoms rather than the cause of Sega's decline. He concluded that "Sega's misadventures during the 1990s had left both gamers and publishers wary of any new platform bearing its name". According to 1Up.com's Jeremy Parish, it would be intellectually dishonest to blame Sony for "killing the Dreamcast by overselling the PS2", as Sega's lack of support for previous consoles had made customers hesitant to purchase Dreamcasts.

In 2009, IGN named the Dreamcast the eighth-greatest video game console, praising its software and innovations, including its online play. In 2010, PC Magazine's Jeffrey L. Wilson named the Dreamcast the greatest console and said that it was "gone too soon". In 2013, Edge named the Dreamcast the tenth-best console of the last 20 years, highlighting innovations including in-game voice chat, downloadable content, and second-screen technology through the use of VMUs. Edge wrote that "Sega's console was undoubtedly ahead of its time, and it suffered at retail for that reason... [b]ut its influence can still be felt today." Dan Whitehead of Eurogamer likened the Dreamcast to "a small, square, white plastic JFK. A progressive force in some ways, perhaps misguided in others, but nevertheless a promising life cut tragically short by dark shadowy forces, spawning complex conspiracy theories that endure to this day." He wrote that its short lifespan "may have sealed its reputation as one of the greatest consoles ever", as "nothing builds a cult like a tragic demise". According to IGN's Travis Fahs, "Many hardware manufacturers have come and gone, but it's unlikely any will go out with half as much class as Sega."

If ever a system deserved to succeed, it was Dreamcast. Dreamcast has a hell of a library. It's dying now, 18 months old, with a larger library than the 5-year-old Nintendo 64. It's a better library than the Nintendo 64. Dreamcast was a wonderful system.

— Journalist Steven L. Kent, March 2001.

The Dreamcast's game library was celebrated. In January 2000, three months after the Dreamcast's North American launch, Electronic Gaming Monthly wrote that "with triple-A stuff like Soul Calibur, NBA 2K, and soon Crazy Taxi to kick around, we figure you're happy you took the 128-bit plunge". In a retrospective, PC Magazine's Jeffrey L. Wilson referred to Dreamcast's "killer library" and said that Sega's creative influence and visual innovation had been at its peak. The staff of Edge agreed with this assessment of Dreamcast games, including Sega's arcade conversions, stating that the system "delivered the first games that could meaningfully be described as arcade perfect". Damien McFerran of Retro Gamer praised Dreamcast's NAOMI arcade ports, and wrote: "The thrill of playing Crazy Taxi in the arcade knowing full well that a pixel-perfect conversion (and not some cut-down port) was set to arrive on the Dreamcast is an experience gamers are unlikely to witness again."

Nick Montfort and Mia Consalvo, writing in Loading... The Journal of the Canadian Game Studies Association, argued that "the Dreamcast hosted a remarkable amount of video game development that went beyond the odd and unusual and is interesting when considered as avant-garde ... It is hard to imagine a commercial console game expressing strong resistance to the commodity perspective and to the view that game production is commerce. But even when it comes to resisting commercialization, it is arguable that Dreamcast games came closer to expressing this attitude than any other console games have." 1Up.com's Jeremy Parish favorably compared Sega's Dreamcast output, which included some of "the most varied, creative, and fun [games] the company had ever produced", with its "enervated" status as a third-party. Fahs noted, "The Dreamcast's life was fleeting, but it was saturated with memorable titles, most of which were completely new properties." According to author Steven L. Kent, "From Sonic Adventure and Shenmue to Space Channel 5 and Seaman, Dreamcast delivered and delivered and delivered."

Some journalists have compared the demise of the Dreamcast with changing trends in the video game industry. In 1001 Video Games You Must Play Before You Die, Duncan Harris wrote: "One of the reasons that older gamers mourned the loss of the Dreamcast was that it signaled the demise of arcade gaming culture ... Sega's console gave hope that things were not about to change for the worse and that the tenets of fast fun and bright, attractive graphics were not about to sink into a brown and green bog of realistic war games." Jeremy Parish, writing for USgamer, contrasted the Dreamcast's diverse library with the "suffocating sense of conservatism" that pervaded the gaming industry in the following decade. According to Sega's head of product implementation, Tadashi Takezaki, the Dreamcast would have been Sega's last video game console no matter how it sold because of the changes in the market and the rise of PCs. He praised the Dreamcast for its features, saying in 2013, "The seeds we sowed with the Dreamcast are finally bearing fruit at this point in time. In some ways, we were going by the seat of our pants, but it was part of the Sega credo at the time — if it's fun, then go for it."

The Dreamcast remains popular in the video game homebrew community. By 2014, unlicensed Dreamcast games formatted for MIL-CD, a multimedia-enhanced format developed by Sega and supported by the Dreamcast, continued to be released. After Sega shut down the official Dreamcast servers, hobbyists developed private servers to allow games such as Phantasy Star Online to continue being played online. Hobbyists have restored online functions for over 50 Dreamcast games as of 2026.

== Bibliography ==
- Mott, Tony (2013). 1001 Video Games You Must Play Before You Die. New York City: Universe Publishing. ISBN 978-0-7893-2090-2.
- DeMaria, Rusel; Wilson, Johnny L. (2004). High Score!: The Illustrated History of Electronic Games. Emeryville, California: McGraw-Hill/Osborne. ISBN 978-0-07-223172-4.
- Kent, Steven L. (2001). The Ultimate History of Video Games: The Story Behind the Craze that Touched our Lives and Changed the World. Roseville, California: Prima Publishing. ISBN 978-0-7615-3643-7.
