= Dreamcast VGA =

Accessory for the Dreamcast

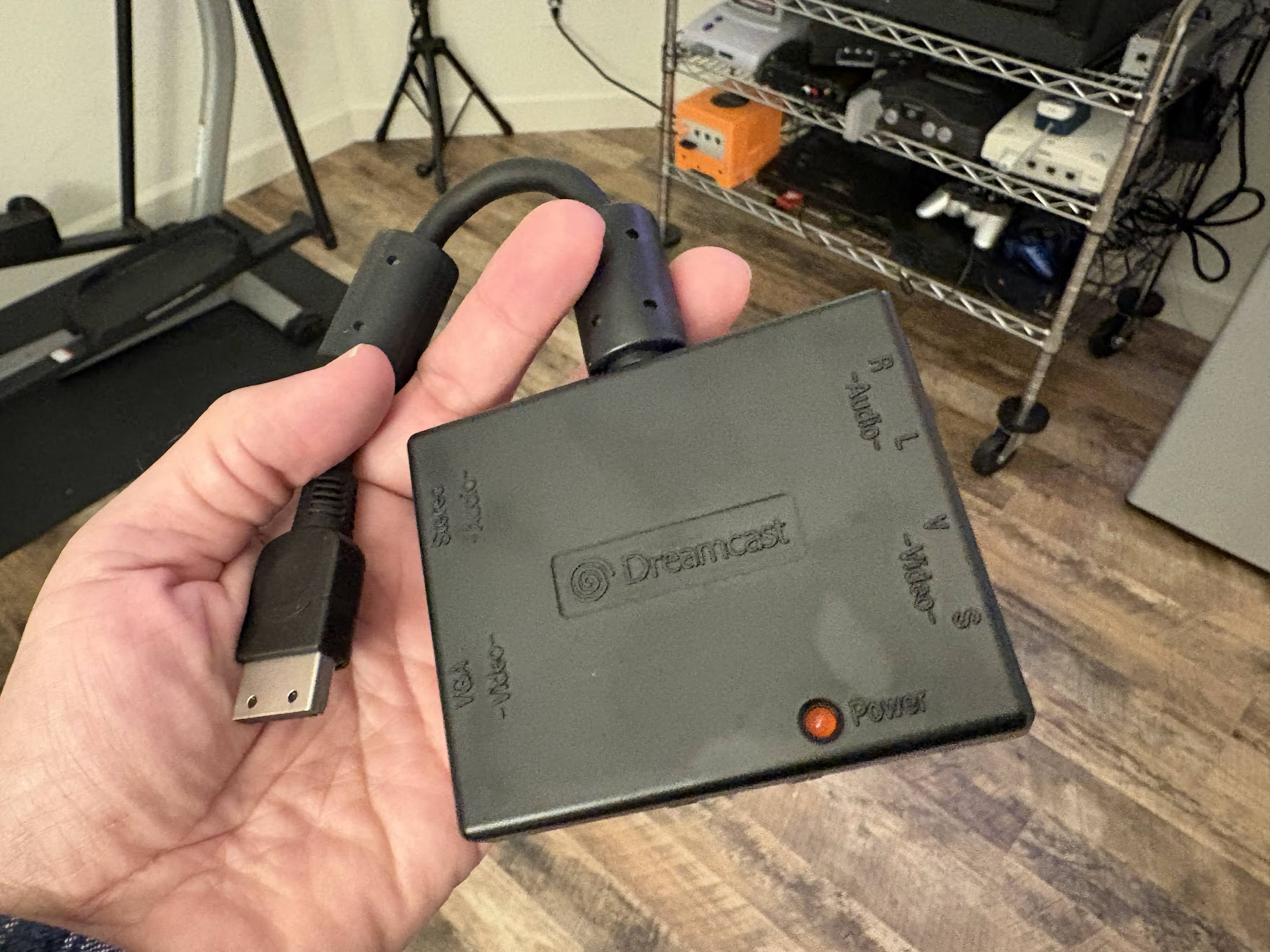
Sega original VGA box front

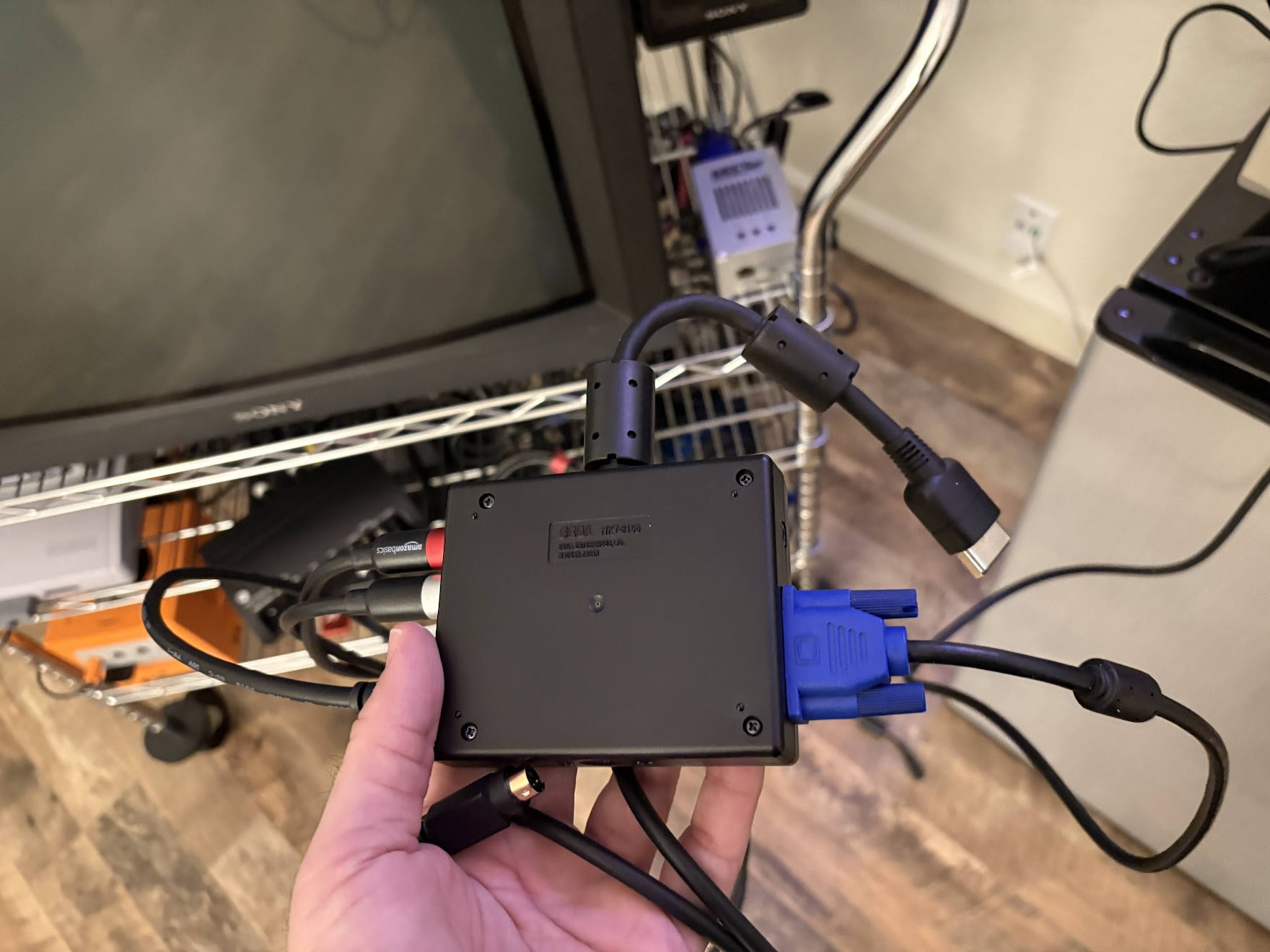
Sega original VGA box back

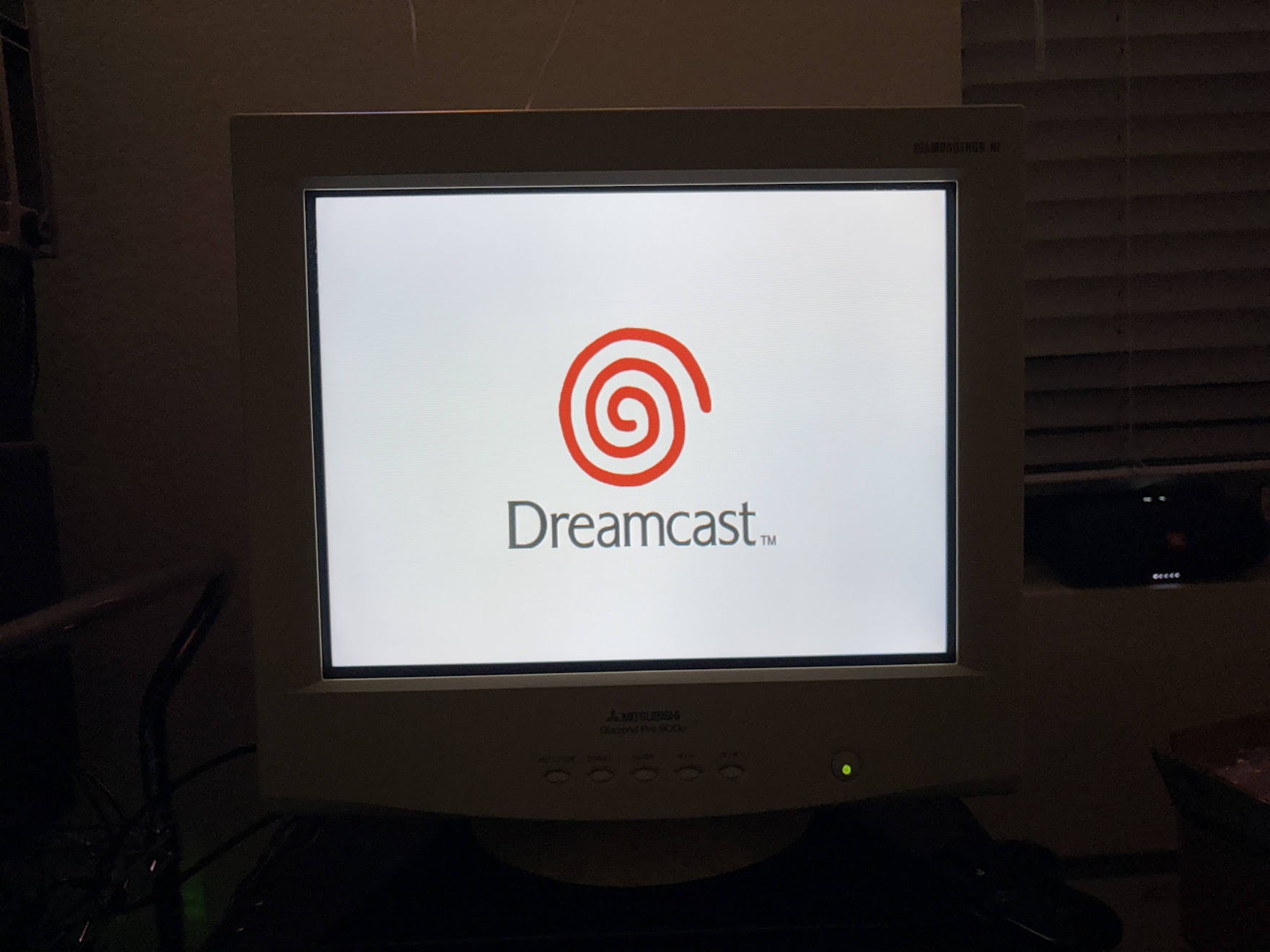
Dreamcast boot screen in VGA PC monitor

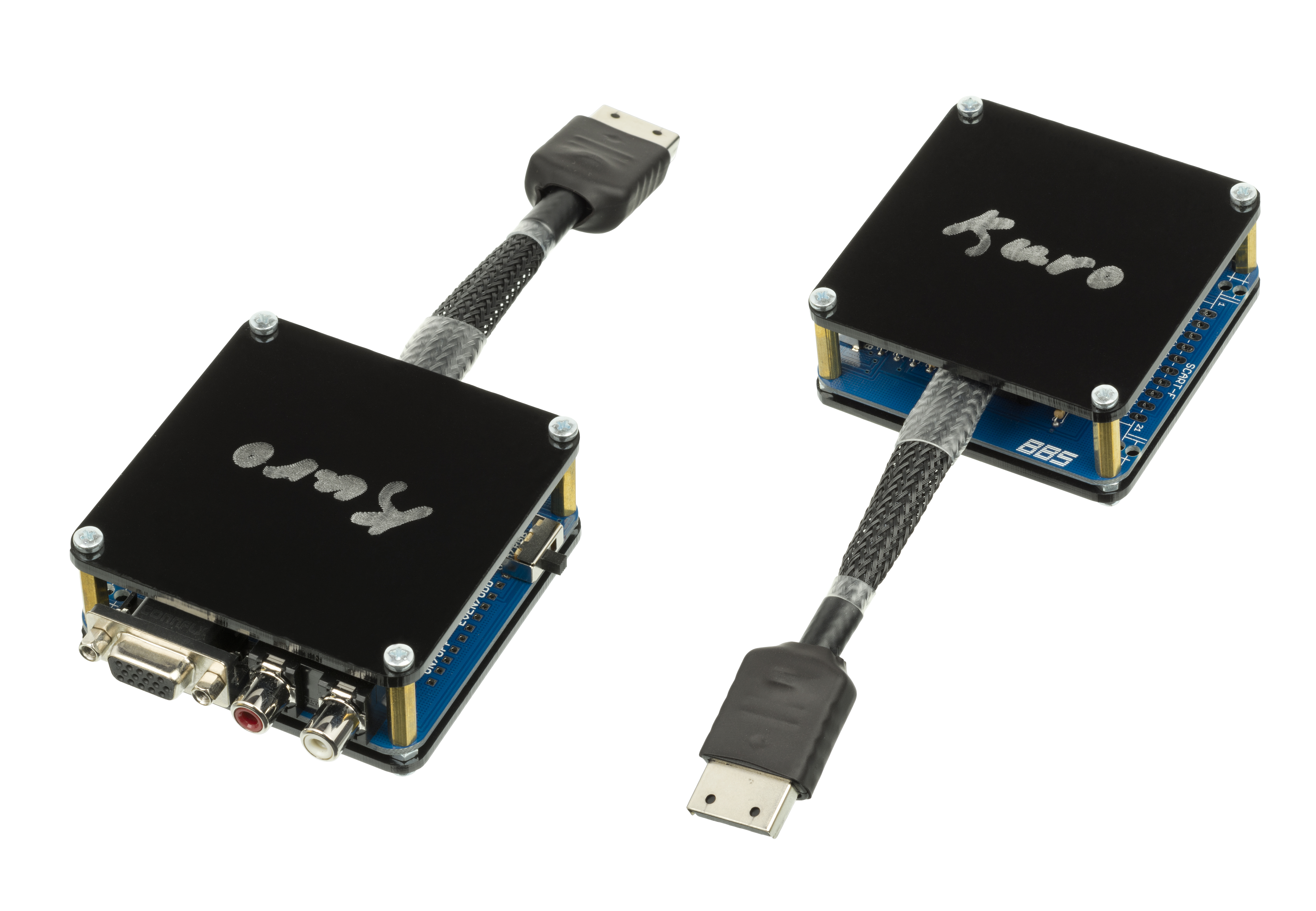
The Kuro, a recent VGA box made by enthusiasts in Turkey

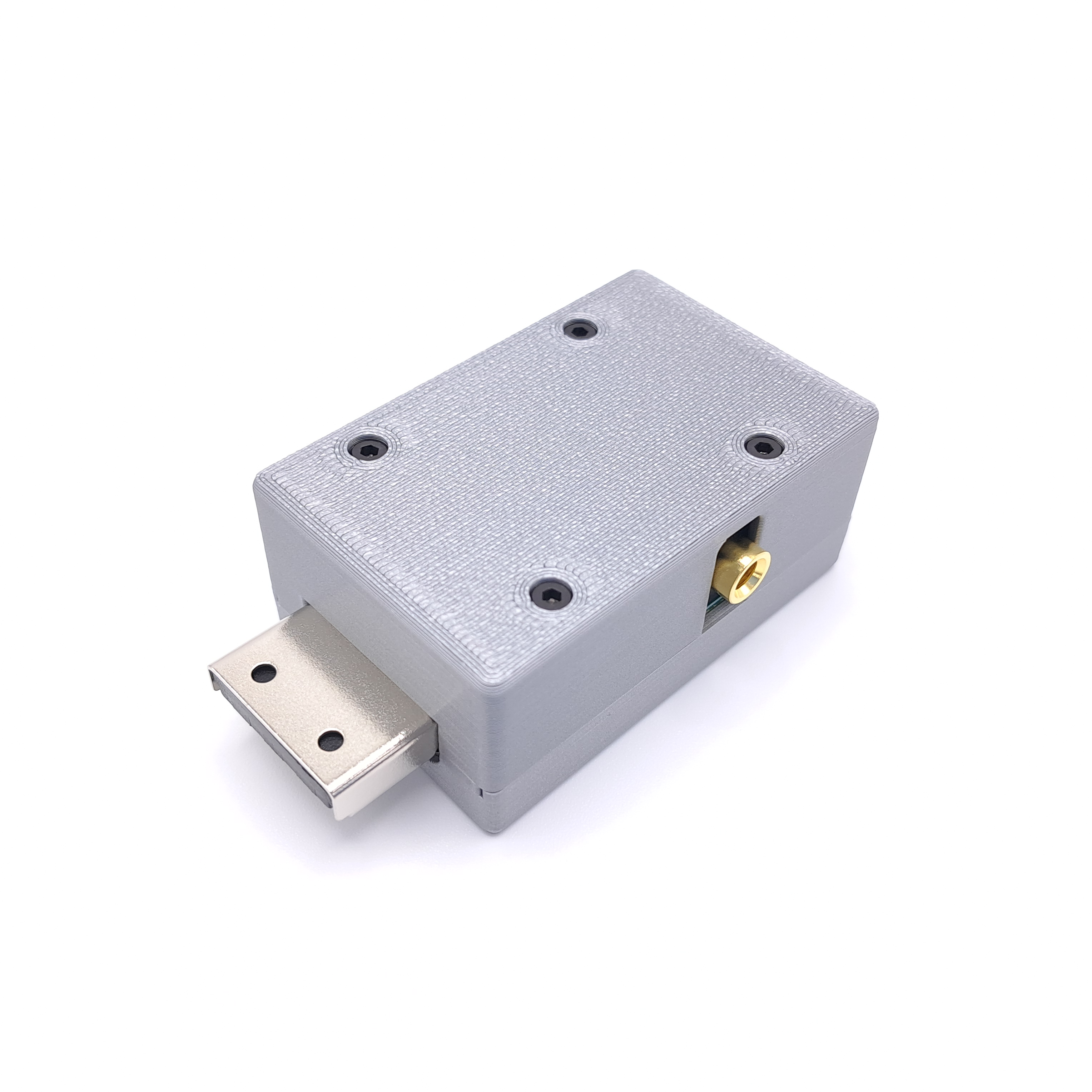
A compact VGA box for Dreamcast with 3D printed shell

The Dreamcast VGA Box is an accessory for the Dreamcast, a video game console produced by Sega, that allows it to output to a computer monitor or a high-definition television (HDTV) set through a VGA connector in 480p, otherwise known as progressive scan. The Dreamcast was one of the first consoles to support 480p and HDTV in general. Sega released the VGA Box as an official accessory in Japan on January 14, 1999, at an MSRP of ¥7000; it was only available in the United States via Sega's online store, retailing between $30 and $50. (Note: The U.S. version of Official Dreamcast Magazine stated various prices for the official VGA Box during its run, mentioning it as $30, $40, and $50.) Though the VGA Box did not receive a release in Europe, PAL consoles can use it since it has no regional lockout.

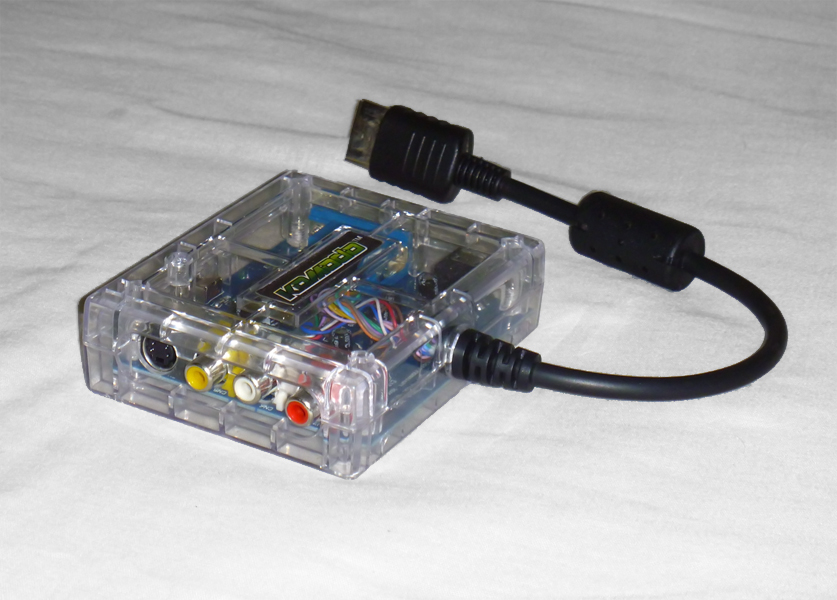
Most VGA boxes also have S-Video and composite video output.

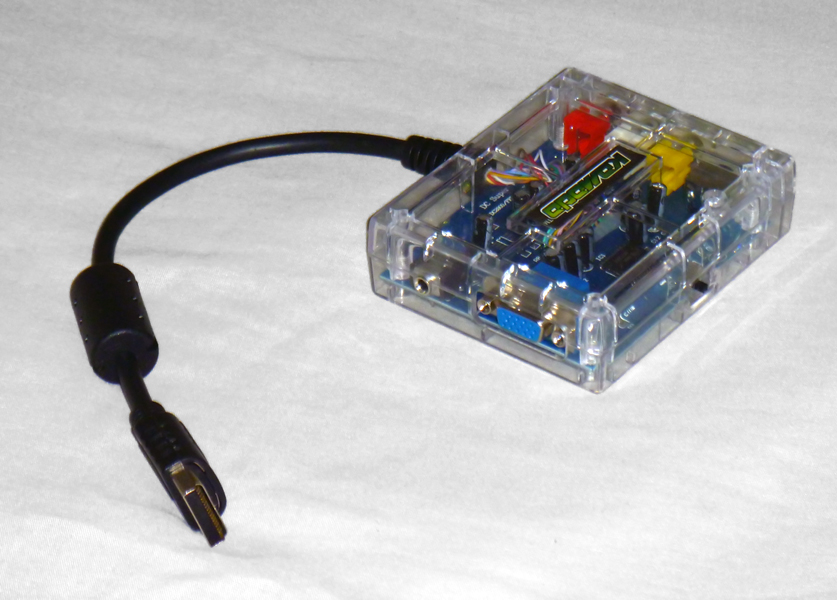
A third-party Dreamcast VGA box

The official VGA Box includes a VGA connector for video output and a headphone jack for stereo audio output; it also includes an S-Video connector and RCA connectors for composite video and stereo audio. It features a switch on the back to allow selecting which active video output is currently activated (i.e. VGA vs RCA).

Most third-party versions are functionally similar to Sega's model, but some designs like Performance's add features such as VGA passthrough.

That said, there are confirmed reports that some VGA boxes will output a VGA signal with diverging color balance when compared to the original Sega VGA box

Most Dreamcast games are compatible with the VGA Box so long as they display in 640×480; this applies to most 3D titles. Games marked as incompatible typically present an error message upon boot; such a designation was determined via a simple toggle switch in the game's code. As such, VGA output from most incompatible games can be forced via having the VGA Box unplugged while booting a game, temporarily switching the VGA Box into TV mode while booting a game, or using a boot disc such as DC-X. This loophole is not possible for games that only display in lower resolutions, with most sprite-based games rendered fully incompatible with VGA output as a result. Though a handful of sprite-based games supported VGA, most notably ones from Capcom, at least some, if not all of their sprites were originally designed for lower-resolution displays and may resultingly appear less detailed when displayed through VGA due to poor image scaling.

== See also ==
- List of Dreamcast games
