= List of controversial video games =

This is a list of video games considered controversial. The list includes games that have earned controversies for violence, sexual content, racism, and review bombing from fans. Some of the video games on this list have been banned or regionally censored.

== Video game series ==
Release dates	Series title	Platform	Primary developer/publisher	Reason(s)
1992–present	Mortal Kombat	Arcade, PC, Consoles, Mobile devices, Stadia, Nintendo Switch, Nintendo Switch 2	Midway (later Warner Bros. Interactive)	Blood, violence and gore. First fighter to introduce "Fatalities" to finish off opponents. (Note: Attributed to multiple sources:) When released for home console formats, it became the first "big budget" game to raise the issue of violence in the medium. Possible catalyst to the implementation of a rating system such as ESRB.
1996–present	Pokémon	Game Boy, Nintendo 64, Game Boy Color, Game Boy Advance, GameCube, Nintendo DS, Wii, WiiWare, Nintendo 3DS, Wii U, Android, iOS, Nintendo Switch, Nintendo Switch 2	Nintendo, Game Freak	Jynx, one of the series' titular creatures, came under heavy backlash following a 2000 article by Carole Boston Weatherford that accused its design of perpetrating blackface imagery. The resulting controversy forced a drastic redesign of Jynx, changing its skin from black to purple and shrinking its eyes and mouth. The series was also attacked by Protestant Evangelical groups, who argued that it promoted Satanic themes. In response, the Vatican broadcast its public approval of Pokémon in April 2000, claiming that the game was based on "intense ties of friendship", and lacked "any harmful moral side effects."
1997–present	Grand Theft Auto	Android, Dreamcast, Fire OS, Game Boy Color, Game Boy Advance, iOS, Nintendo DS, Nintendo Switch, PC, PS1, PS2, PS3, PS4, PS5, PSP, Windows Phone, Xbox, Xbox 360, Xbox One, Xbox Series X	Rockstar Games (formerly DMA Design, now Rockstar North) (Take-Two Interactive)	See also: Controversies surrounding Grand Theft Auto IV, Controversies surrounding Grand Theft Auto V, and Hot Coffee mod Sexual themes, drug use, racism, nudity, foul and sexually explicit language, drunk driving, violence (against civilians, law enforcement members and military personnel). Grand Theft Auto: San Andreas was originally rated "Mature" in the U.S., but was reviewed and re-rated "Adults Only" after controversy surrounding a fanmade Hot Coffee mod which unlocked a hidden sex scene (which was in the game's code, but left out of the final version). It was again re-rated "Mature" after Rockstar Games removed this scene from the game's code. In Grand Theft Auto IV: The Lost and Damned, one mission features full frontal male nudity, while in Grand Theft Auto V, one mission sees the character Trevor Philips torturing another character in several different ways, including waterboarding, pulling out teeth, and administering electrical shocks to the nipples. Grand Theft Auto: Chinatown Wars featured a drug-dealing mini-game.
1997–present	Postal	PC, Android, iOS, Nintendo Switch, PS4	Running with Scissors/Various	Violence and anti-law, most of which is committed against both civilians and government authorities, as well as racism, sexual themes, drug use, language, and animal cruelty. Postal 2 was banned in New Zealand and Australia. In Germany, Postal, Postal 2 and Postal III were added to The List of Media Harmful to Young People as adult only.
2003–2007	Manhunt	PS2, PC, Xbox, Wii, PlayStation Portable	Rockstar Games (Rockstar North) (Take-Two Interactive)	Excessive violence and gore. Manhunt gained significant controversy after it was alleged that the game inspired a teenager to commit a murder. Banned in Australia. Manhunt 2 has been labeled as possibly the most violent video game ever made and is infamous for being one of only four video games to have received an "Adults Only" rating due to violence. Further controversy surrounds the Wii version, due to the fact that it actually simulates the violence through motion control, causing it to be dubbed a "murder simulator".
2007–present	Mass Effect	PS3, Xbox 360, PC, BlackBerry 10, iOS, Android, Windows Phone, Wii U, PS4, Xbox One	BioWare/Microsoft Game Studios (later Electronic Arts)	See also: Mass Effect 3 § Controversies Falsely accused by evangelical blogger Kevin McCullough of containing "rape and sodomy", which later led to the removal of McCullough's blog entry on Townhall.com. The game was featured on the Fox News Channel following the controversy, with host Martha MacCallum, which included the headline "full graphic sex". The game was briefly banned in Singapore due to the controversy. While critically acclaimed overall, the ending of Mass Effect 3 was highly criticized as, among other issues, rendered all the decisions players had made in the trilogy, carried over through save files, moot, in contrast to marketing material BioWare had put forth for the game. Due to a large reaction from the player base, BioWare released free downloadable content that provided a more cinematic ending sequence that addressed some of these concerns. Other controversies included the release of Mass Effect 3: From Ashes as day-one paid DLC; public outrage over the alleged link between the series' in-game combat violence to the perpetrator of the Sandy Hook Elementary School shooting, which was eventually debunked; and the portrayal and representation of women as well as sexual minorities. (Note: Attributed to multiple sources:)
2011–present	Gal Gun	Xbox 360, Xbox One, PS3, PS4, PS Vita, Nintendo Switch, PC	Inti-Creates	The Gal Gun series has been criticized by western critics due to allowing players to sexually exploit teenage girls. Inti-Creates was forced by Microsoft to censor the Xbox 360 version due to players being able to look up the girls' skirts, while the PlayStation 3 version remained completely uncensored. The sequel, Gal Gun: Double Peace, which was released internationally, was banned in New Zealand for the same reason.
2011–present	Senran Kagura	Nintendo 3DS, iOS, Android, PlayStation Vita, PlayStation 4, Microsoft Windows, Nintendo Switch	Marvelous	The hack and slash game series gained notoriety for its accusations of sexism regarding the objectifications of underage women. The US distributors censored the adolescent ages of the playable female shinobi characters to avoid charges of hebephilia.
2018–2021	Super Seducer	PC	Red Dahlia Interactive	Super Seducer was billed as "the world's most realistic seduction simulator". The player is taught by a pickup artist how to pick up women by going through multiple choice questions accompanied by video clips. The game came under fire by a number of video game critics; one described it as the "world's sleaziest game", and another criticized the game for "normalizing rape culture" Prior to its release, the game had its crowdfunding campaign suspended by Kickstarter. According to its press release, this was due to "inappropriate content, including but not limited to offensive or pornographic material", and "spamming or abusive behavior, offering rewards in violation of Kickstarter's rules." During release, the developer came under fire for ordering a DMCA takedown request against a YouTuber after he made a video critiquing the game. Its release on PlayStation 4 was pulled by Sony shortly before it was due for release. The original and second installments were blocked from release by Nintendo over explicit contents in 2021. Despite releasing the first two installments, the third installment was pulled from Steam; despite this, they allowed them to remain on their store.

== Multiplayer games ==
Release dates	Series title	Platform	Primary developer/publisher	Reason(s)
2006–present	Roblox	Windows, macOS, iOS, Android, Xbox One, Meta Quest 2, Meta Quest Pro, PlayStation 4, PlayStation 5	Roblox Corporation	See also: Censorship of Roblox
2023–present	Gorebox	Android, Linux and WIndows	F2Games	Graphic violence

== 1970s–1980s ==
Release date	Title	Platform	Developer/Publisher	Reason(s)
1973	Gotcha	Arcade	Atari	Controversial due to the controls being perceived as pink rubber bulges that were meant to represent breasts and were squeezed in order to control the action.
1976	Death Race	Arcade	Exidy	The object of the game is to run over stickmen "gremlins", who then scream and are replaced by tombstones, which for the time was seen as overtly violent.
1982	Custer's Revenge	Atari 2600	American Multiple Industries	The game depicts a crudely rendered General Custer dodging arrows to reach a naked Native American woman tied to a post with the goal of sexually penetrating her to earn points. The game was protested as being racist, sexist, and promoting sexual violence. (Note: Attributed to multiple sources:)
1984	Raid over Moscow	Amiga, Amstrad CPC, Apple II, Atari 8-bit, Commodore 64, Plus/4, ZX Spectrum	Access Software	The game's premise, based on stopping a pre-emptive nuclear attack on the United States by bombing Soviet military bases, led to significant political controversy in Cold War Europe, being added to the BPjM index in West Germany, restricting sales to adults only, and was deemed by the East German Stasi to be one of several games of "a particularly militaristic and inhumane nature". In Finland, the distribution of the game was questioned by an MP of the Finnish People's Democratic League, leading to diplomatic protests from the Soviet Union.
1985	International Karate	Amstrad CPC, Apple II, Atari 8-bit, Atari ST, Commodore 64, Commodore 16, MS-DOS, MSX, ZX Spectrum	System 3	Main article: Data East USA, Inc. v. Epyx, Inc. Data East USA sued Epyx, the publisher of the game in the United States (under the name of World Karate Championship) due to similarities between International Karate and Data East's Karate Champ. Although the suit was dismissed, Data East was successful in obtaining an injunction to prevent further sales of World Karate Championship, which was subsequently appealed and reversed.
1986	177	NEC PC-8801	dB-SOFT	A bishoujo game revolving around rape, it ignited a public furor that reached the National Diet of Japan.
1986	Arkanoid	Arcade	Taito	Due to its resemblance to Super Breakout, the game instigated a lawsuit by Atari, Inc.
1986	Chiller	Arcade, NES	Exidy	The game features scenes of torture chambers, graphic violence, and gore, which caused many arcade owners to avoid purchasing it in order to maintain a family-friendly image.
1986	Twister	ZX Spectrum	System 3	Originally titled Twister: Mother of Harlots but was renamed after a controversy regarding the title and sexualized promotion with skimpily dressed dancers at the PCM Show, an industry event. (Note: Attributed to multiple sources:)
1987	Barbarian: The Ultimate Warrior	Acorn Electron, Amiga, Amstrad CPC, Apple II, Atari ST, BBC Micro, Commodore 64, MS-DOS, ZX Spectrum	Palace Software	The cover art of the game, which featured bikini-clad Maria Whittaker, a model who was then associated with The Sun tabloid's Page Three topless photo shoots, and Michael Van Wijk, who was only wearing a loincloth, provoked outrage in the United Kingdom. Electron User magazine received letters from readers and religious bodies, who called the image "offensive and particularly insulting to women" and an "ugly pornographic advertisement". Barbarian's violent content also sparked significant controversy and was restricted to adults only in Germany by the Bundesprüfstelle für jugendgefährdende Medien because of it.
1987	The Great Giana Sisters	Amiga, Amstrad CPC, Atari ST, C64, MSX2	Rainbow Arts, U.S. Gold	Nintendo had objected to its close resemblance to Super Mario Bros. Later games in the series such as Giana Sisters DS and Giana Sisters: Twisted Dreams were officially released on Nintendo systems.
1987	Katakis	Amiga	Factor 5	Activision Europe, who held the rights to R-Type, objected to the game's obvious similarity.
1988	The Race Against Time	Amstrad CPC, Commodore 64, ZX Spectrum	Codemasters	The original packaging had an image of American athlete Jesse Owens on its front cover. However, after the game had been released, Owens' estate objected. Codemasters had neglected to obtain permission from the family to use Owens' likeness, and they declined to grant permission retroactively. Therefore, Codemasters was forced to recall all of the copies of the game that had already been produced, and to change promotional materials. The company replaced the image of Owens with one of Carl Lewis, who had offered the use of his likeness for free.
1988	Bionic Commando	NES	Capcom	It was deemed controversial to Nintendo for the Nazi imagery and its inclusion of Adolf Hitler as the final boss as Nintendo altered the game to avoid its offensive content. It was also controversial for its single use of the word "damn" and the explicit gory image of Hitler when he is defeated. However, it was refused to be reissued on Virtual Console for undisclosed reasons as it was remade as Bionic Commando Rearmed.
1989	Final Fight	Arcade|Super NES, Amiga, Amstrad CPC, Atari ST, Commodore 64, ZX Spectrum, X68000, Sega CD, CPS Changer, Game Boy Advance, Java ME	Capcom	Controversy related to beating up female characters Poison and Roxy as a mandatory part of game play, which some felt encouraged violence against women. Developers attempt to overcome this by casting them as transgender, a move which later became controversial itself
1989	Super Monaco GP	Arcade, Sega Genesis, Amiga, Amstrad CPC, Atari ST, Commodore 64, Game Gear, Master System, ZX Spectrum	Sega	Phillip Morris sued Sega (and some other video game companies, including Namco and Atari Games on behalf of their Final Lap game) because the arcade version of the game contains advertisements that resemble those for Marlboro cigarettes.

== 1990s ==
Release date	Title	Platform	Developer/Publisher	Reason(s)
1991	J.B. Harold Murder Club	TurboGrafx-16	NEC	Sexual themes, including a reference to an unsolved rape.
1992	Wolfenstein 3D	MS-DOS, SNES, 3DO, Jaguar, Game Boy Advance, Xbox, Xbox 360, PlayStation 3, iOS, Android	id Software	Violence, gore, Nazi symbolism, and the inclusion of Adolf Hitler as the final boss (this was particularly problematic to German distributors, who banned the sale of the game outright).
1992	Night Trap	Sega CD	Digital Pictures, Sega	Violence, child abuse and sexual themes.
1992	Freedom!	Apple II	MECC	Freedom! was modelled similarly to MECC's previous The Oregon Trail to be used as an educational software game to teach students about escaping as a slave along the Underground Railroad; the game was developed with an African-American consultant as to utilize language patterns of the time period, and intended to be used with in-class curriculum to augment the game. However, in practical use, most students played the game without guidance, leading to parents to demand the game be pulled due to perceived insensitivities the game took towards the plight of the slaves. MECC tried to work with concerned groups to address faults in the game, but ultimately pulled the game instead.
1993	Fighter's History	Arcade, SNES	Data East	See also: Capcom U.S.A. Inc. v. Data East Corp. Capcom sued Data East in the United States and Japan on grounds of copyright infringements pertaining to Street Fighter II property. The U.S. case was ruled in favor of Data East (which argued Karate Champ was the true originator of the competitive fighting game genre), as the "copied" elements were excluded from copyright, similar to Apple's graphical user interface lawsuit against Microsoft.
1993	Doom	MS-DOS, then various	id Software	First-person violence, gore, and satanic themes. Was once blamed for the Columbine High School massacre.
1995	Phantasmagoria	Windows, MS-DOS, Saturn	Sierra On-Line	The game's at-the-time relatively uncommon horror themes, featuring violence and sexual content (including a rape scene), sparked significant controversy. US computer retailer CompUSA announced that they would not stock the game. The game was outright refused classification in Australia by the Office of Film and Literature Classification in September 1995.
1996	SimCopter	Windows	Maxis	A programmer named Jacques Servin introduced unauthorized "himbo" characters into the game, who would appear on certain dates and kiss.
1996	Duke Nukem 3D	MS-DOS, Saturn, PlayStation, PS3, PS Vita, PS4, Nintendo 64, Xbox 360, Xbox One, Android, iOS	3D Realms	Violence, sexual themes, nudity
1996	Tomb Raider	MS-DOS, Saturn, PlayStation	Eidos	An unauthorized software patch nicknamed "Nude Raider" was created by fans, which allowed players to play as a naked Lara Croft.
1996	Battlecruiser 3000AD	MS-DOS, Windows	3000 AD	The developers of this game claimed that neural networks could be used by the player to command objects and characters within the game to perform certain tasks using an AI feature, however, such a concept was nearly impossible for the technology standard of the mid-1990s and various players of the game claimed such a feature was not actually possible (which would be false advertising) and as a result of this controversy, years of heated debates about this validity of the topic took place in online forums, with over 70,000 documented entries taking one side of the debate or the other.
1997	Blood	MS-DOS	Monolith Productions	Graphic violence, including an advertisement featuring a man lying in a bathtub full of blood.
1997	Carmageddon	MS-DOS, Windows, Mac, N64, iOS, PlayStation	SCi, Interplay Entertainment	Violence against pedestrians and animals.
1997	Formula 1 97	Windows, PlayStation	Psygnosis	The game was withdrawn from shops six weeks after its release due to legal proceedings with the FIA (Formula One's governing body), which objected to the use of the FIA logo on the game's packaging. It was re-released without the logo, but the FIA were left unsatisfied. The FIA lost a court case however, and the game continued to be sold without the logo.
1998	Thrill Kill	PlayStation	Virgin Interactive	After Electronic Arts acquired the assets of Virgin Interactive in mid-1998, it quickly cancelled the release of Thrill Kill (which was due to be released in time for the holiday season) due to objections over the game's high level of violent content.
1998	Secret Writer's Society	Macintosh	Panasonic Interactive Media	A software bug caused by a memory management issue caused the text-to-speech functionality of an educational game aimed at children to recite profanities to the player. After mainstream coverage picked up on the issue, art collective RTMark falsely claimed credit for the bug being an act of sabotage to "wake parents up to reality". The organisation's cofounder, Igor Vamos, later stated this was a hoax to be "provocative". Copies were pulled from release by publisher Panasonic, who issued an apology and offered to replace copies with a patched version.
1999	Kingpin: Life of Crime	Windows	Interplay Entertainment	Excessive violence, especially in light of the then-recent Columbine High School massacre which took place before the game's release. Developer Xatrix implemented a "safe" mode which tones down the game's gore and bleeps out profanities in an effort to appease watchdog and parent groups.
1999	Pico's School	Browser	Tom Fulp	Depiction of a school shooting while also being released recently after the Columbine Massacre. Profanity, swastikas and genitals.

== 2000s ==
Release date	Title	Platform	Developer/Publisher	Reason(s)
2000	Dance Dance Revolution Solo	Arcade	Konami	In 2002, a local arcade in San Diego, California removed a Solo 2000 machine after members of the local "Youth Advocacy Coalition" complained that the background movies of selected songs contained images that could promote drug and alcohol abuse, such as a scantily clad nurse, pills in "I'm Alive", and alcoholic drinks appearing in "Club Tropicana". The machine was replaced by a mix which did not contain the imagery.
2000	Daikatana	PC	Ion Storm	A highly controversial advertisement regarding John Romero's involvement with the game, which caused an equally highly publicized outrage; the game was also criticized for its perceived "low quality" and "outdated graphics".
2000	Soldier of Fortune	PC, Dreamcast, PS2	Raven Software, Activision	In 2000, after receiving a complaint from a member of the public about the explicit content of the game, the British Columbia Film Classification Office investigated and decided the violence, gore and acts of torture were not suitable for persons under 18 years of age. In a controversial decision, the game was labeled an "adult motion picture" and was rated as a pornographic film. In Germany, the game was placed on the Index List of the Federal Department for Media Harmful to Young Persons.
2000	Perfect Dark	N64, Xbox 360, Xbox One (Rare Replay)	Rare, Nintendo, Microsoft Studios (now Xbox Game Studios)	While the game itself was largely met with critical acclaim, some felt that it was inappropriate for Nintendo to be producing, as they had already established a lengthy reputation for being a family-friendly video game company at the time.
2001	Conker's Bad Fur Day	N64, Xbox One (Rare Replay)	Rare, Nintendo, Microsoft Studios (now Xbox Game Studios)	While the game was critically acclaimed, some felt that it was inappropriate for Nintendo to be producing the game, due to its grotesque and risqué humor.
2001	Tear Ring Saga	PS1	Tirnanog	The game, whose development was spearheaded by Shouzou Kaga, the creator of the Fire Emblem series, was subject to legal actions both during and after development by Nintendo, which owned the Fire Emblem intellectual property (partly due to the game being released for a competitor console). However, Nintendo was ultimately unable to stop the development or the sales of the game. Initially titled Emblem Saga during development, the game's name and other features were later changed to remove all direct references to Fire Emblem.
2002	Ethnic Cleansing	PC	Resistance Records	The game is played through the lens of a neo-Nazi white supremacist whose mission is to kill and eradicate various racial, religious, and sexuality-based minority groups. The Anti-Defamation League have had congressional hearings over the game in the hopes that it is made illegal to possess or sell in the United States.
2002	Kaboom!	Browser	fabolous999	Players control a suicide bomber, the aim of the game being to kill as many people as possible.
2002	State of Emergency	PC, PS2, Xbox	Rockstar Games (Take-Two Interactive), VIS Entertainment	Contains graphic gun violence, including political assassinations and coup d'états. Additionally, the game caused controversy in Washington due to the game's similarities to the World Trade Organization riots in Seattle.
2002	Kakuto Chojin: Back Alley Brutal	Xbox	Dream Publishing, Microsoft Game Studios	The theme song for the Middle Eastern character Asad had Quran verses chanted in the background. Kakuto Chojin is a fighting game and this song played in the background of Asad's stage, where Asad and other characters fight each other. Senior geopolitical strategist Kate Edwards consulted with an Arabic speaker within Microsoft. The Arabic speaker asked for Kakuto Chojin not to be released because the game's "incredible insult to Islam". The game was released in North America anyway because the publisher thought that the verses would not be noticed. When the verses in the song were indeed noticed, Microsoft was pressured into destroying un-shipped units of Kakuto Chojin and recalling the game to remove the Quran verses from the song. While this amended version of Kakuto Chojin was released, many uncensored copies still inadvertently made it to retailers in places where this kind of content is particularly sensitive. One of those places was Saudi Arabia, a country where Islam is the state religion. Kakuto Chojin made headline news and the Saudi Arabian government formally protested to Microsoft, forcing the full recall of the game worldwide.
2003	Dead or Alive Xtreme Beach Volleyball	Xbox	Tecmo	Many critics have commented that the game's use of female bodies is often ridiculous at best, and some have found it offensive.
2003	Whiplash	PlayStation 2, Xbox	Crystal Dynamics	The game generated some controversy over the depiction of animal cruelty, mainly by the RSPCA.
2003	Laden VS USA		Panyu Gaming Electronic Co.	The game was based on the September 11 attacks and the packaging used a 9/11 photograph; two American stores banned the sale of the game outright and numerous American retailers refused to stock the game due to its perceived insensitivity.
2004	The Sims 2	PC	Electronic Arts	A player-made mod allowed for the blur effect that appears when a character is nude to be removed. However, the nude Sims are featureless.
2004	JFK Reloaded	PC	Traffic Games	The player is given the role of Lee Harvey Oswald as he assassinates U.S. President John F. Kennedy. The game was criticized for its controversial content matter in recreating the assassination, and was condemned by a spokesman for Senator Ted Kennedy as "despicable".
2004	The Guy Game	PC, PlayStation 2, Xbox	Topheavy Studios/Gathering of Developers	An adult trivia game that treated winners to full motion videos of young women in bikinis. One of the women that was part of the footage was unaware that she would be appearing in the game, nor was said woman old enough to participate when the video was filmed. In the subsequent lawsuit against Topheavy, Gathering of Developers, Microsoft, and Sony, an injunction banned further sales of the game. Topheavy however, released an edited version (removing footage of the woman in question) that added new footage, and was later published as an interactive DVD title.
2004	Syphon Filter: The Omega Strain	PS2, later released on PS3 on the American PS store	Sony Computer Entertainment America	The first three story missions were supposed to be set in Toronto, Canada, but were changed a few months before the game's release due to some Canadians criticising the missions' premise, which depicted Quebecois nationalists perpetrating a terrorist attack against the Toronto subway. (Note: Attributed to multiple sources:) References to the city's name were removed, with it being renamed to a fictional American place called 'Carthage, Michigan.' Overlooked vestiges of these missions as originally envisaged by the developers can still be seen in the final product, notably pictures of the Toronto skyline, as well as a few remaining references to Canada and Toronto that persisted. Such details include enemies with a French background in these missions and operatives being smuggled from Martinique into America.
2005	The Punisher	PC, PS2, Xbox	Volition, THQ	Interrogation, torture, intense gun fights, drugs, and indiscriminate killing. Originally merited an "Adults Only" rating before being edited on appeal. (Note: Attributed to multiple sources:)
2005	Super Columbine Massacre RPG!	PC	Danny Ledonne	The game simulates the events of the Columbine High School massacre, having the player take on the roles of Eric Harris and Dylan Klebold and reenacting the massacre. (Note: Attributed to multiple sources:)
2005	Gun	PC, PS2, Xbox, GameCube, Xbox 360	Activision	The game's offensive depictions of American Indians prompted the Association for American Indian Development to call a boycott against the game.
2006	Bully	PS3, Xbox 360, PS2, Wii, iOS, Android	Rockstar Games (Rockstar Vancouver) (Take-Two Interactive)	Based upon its title, it was perceived that Bully glorified bullying. The fact that the main character, Jimmy, could also kiss another boy was a matter of controversy. Classification boards generally restricted Bully to a teenage audience: the US-based Entertainment Software Rating Board (ESRB) classified the game with a T rating, the British Board of Film Classification gave it a 15 rating, the Australian Classification Board rated it M, and the New Zealand OFLC restricted it to persons 13 years of age and over. In 2007, Yahoo! Games listed it as one of the top ten controversial games of all time.
2006	The Elder Scrolls IV: Oblivion	Xbox 360, PC, PS3	Bethesda Softworks	Main article: ESRB re-rating of The Elder Scrolls IV: Oblivion Re-rated to "Mature" by the ESRB after a third-party mod revealed a naked topless corpse hidden in the game's data files. While the corpse did not warrant a re-rating of the game in and of itself, upon review, the ESRB noted that the game contained much more explicit violence than had been submitted to them in the original rating submission.
2006	Hitman: Blood Money	PC, PS2, Xbox, Xbox 360, PS3	IO Interactive	Excessive violence and assassinations; a magazine ad featured sexualized and violent imagery of a (fictional) dead woman in lingerie.
2006	Mind Quiz	Nintendo DS, PSP	Ubisoft	Recalled in the United Kingdom due to use of the word "spastic", which is considered highly offensive in said country.
2006	Left Behind: Eternal Forces	PC	Left Behind Games	Accusations that the game promoted religious "convert or kill" violence, sexism and racism. Some reviewers denied that the game contained any truly controversial gameplay, but instead took issue with the game's clumsy controls, in-game advertising and lackluster AI. Ars Technica called it "a relatively harmless and well-done piece of propaganda".
2006	Resistance: Fall of Man	PS3	Insomniac Games	Main article: Controversy over the use of Manchester Cathedral in Resistance: Fall of Man The Church of England objected to the game's use of Manchester Cathedral's interior as a backdrop during a gun battle, and called for the game to be withdrawn, or for the cathedral to at least be removed from the game.
2006	RapeLay	PC	Illusion Soft	Rape is a core part of the gameplay, as the player takes on the role of a chikan who stalks - and subsequently assaults - a mother and her two underage daughters. Three years after its initial release, significant controversy was raised in the UK Parliament and elsewhere, and Equality Now eventually pressured its distributor to withdraw distribution of it in Japan.
2006	Rule of Rose	PS2	Punchline	The Mayor of Rome called for the game to be banned from Italy, saying children "have the right to be shielded from violence". The then European Union justice and security commissioner wrote an open letter condemning the game for "obscene cruelty and brutality". An Italian magazine, Panorama, claimed that in order to win the game, players must bury a girl alive, which the game's European publisher disputed. On the UK release day, the publisher announced that Rule of Rose would not be published in the UK, despite the game being approved for release by the Pan European Game Information (PEGI) and Video Standards Council regulatory bodies.
2007	BioShock	Xbox 360, PC, PS3, iOS	2K Games	An article in The Patriot Ledger, the local paper of developer Irrational Games, argued that the game is "testing the limits of the ultra-violent gaming genre with a strategy that enables players to kill characters resembling young girls." The game presents an ethical choice to players, whether to kill 'Little Sisters' for extra abilities or save them and receive less. President of 2K Boston Ken Levine defended the game as a piece of art, stating "we want to deal with challenging moral issues and if you want to do that, you have to go to some dark places". Jack Thompson took issue with advertisements for the game appearing during WWE SmackDown's airtime, writing to the Federal Trade Commission and stating that M-rated games should not be advertised when large numbers of under-17s are watching.
2007	Mario Party 8	Wii	Nintendo	Use of the phrase "Turn the train spastic! Make this ticket tragic!" by the character Kamek caused controversy in the United Kingdom, where the word spastic is considered offensive (which is the same issue that Mind Quiz raised). This led to a recall of the game; it was later re-released with the word changed to erratic.
2008	Spore	PC	Maxis	Spore's use and implementation of SecuROM digital rights management, including the game's activation policies, was subject to widespread criticism and lawsuits; the game was listed as the most pirated game of 2008. (Note: Attributed to multiple sources:)
2008	Muslim Massacre	PC	Eric 'Sigvatr' Vaughn	The game's contents and subject have been the subject of strong negative response; a spokesperson for the Muslim Council of Britain said "The makers of this 'game' and the ISPs (Internet service providers) who are hosting it should be quite ashamed of themselves. Anti-Muslim prejudice is already on the increase and needs to be challenged and not reinforced through tasteless and offensive stunts like this."
2008	I Am Rich	iPhone OS	Armin Heinrich	Considered a scam, by having no gameplay yet a high price.
2008	Invaders!		Douglas Edric Stanley	An art game exhibited at the 2008 Games Convention in Leipzig. It represents the September 11 attacks in the style of Space Invaders. Players move their bodies to move the cannon, and use arm movements to fire. Like the original Space Invaders, death (game over) is inevitable. Many people considered it tasteless and inappropriate, and Taito threatened legal action for unauthorized use of Space Invaders content. The creator later pulled the game.
2008	Silent Hill: Homecoming	PS3, PC, Xbox 360	Double Helix Games	The game was initially banned and a rating refused in Australia and Germany for extreme violence and disturbing images, which included graphic sexuality, nudity, copious blood sprays, decapitations, partially dismembered corpses, and numerous scenes of attacks, fights, torture and death. The Australian version was subsequently released with the MA15+ rating and censored graphics, while the Japanese release was cancelled altogether.
2008	LittleBigPlanet	PS3	Media Molecule	Lyrics from a licensed song, "Tapha Niang", were removed due to fears that Muslims would be offended, on the basis that it allegedly contained words from the Quran. This led to controversy about the removal itself.
2008	Too Human	Xbox 360	Silicon Knights, Microsoft	The game was revealed to being developed using a stolen version of Unreal Engine 3, following a successful counter-suit by Epic Games (makers of the Unreal Engine), Silicon Knights having initially sued Epic Games for "breach of contract". In November 2012, the counter-suit was ruled in favor of Epic Games, forcing Silicon Knights to recall and destroy all copies of the game, as well as another Unreal Engine-developed game, X-Men: Destiny, as well as cancelling other titles that had been planned to use the engine.
2008	Limbo of the Lost	PC	Majestic Studios	The game's use of plagiarized assets from other games and movies prompted publishers, Tri Synergy, to stop publishing the game.
2009	MadWorld	Wii	PlatinumGames, Sega	On August 19, 2008, Sega announced that MadWorld would not be released in Germany. Despite the fact that Australia is also known for strict video game classification, the game was released there unedited, with an MA15+ rating for "strong bloody violence and strong coarse language". In a preview, Eurogamer commented: "It's difficult to understand why there's so much controversy surrounding MadWorld when the violence is so very Tom and Jerry... It really is hard to be offended... because it's just so ridiculous." On March 10, the National Institute on Media and the Family issued a press release expressing its disappointment in Nintendo for allowing MadWorld to be released on the Wii.
2009	Resident Evil 5	PS3, Xbox 360, PC, PS4, Xbox One, Shield Android TV, Shield Portable, Shield Tablet, Nintendo Switch	Capcom	The game came under controversy for a pre-release trailer that contains scenes of racism, according to Newsweek journalist N'Gai Croal in an April 2008 interview. He also stated that organizations and retailers would object to the game, and that it would cause controversy upon release.
2009	Saw	PS3, Xbox 360, PC	Konami	Several news publishings stated that the game's only purpose was to torture and kill people in violent ways with no sense of restraint or morality whatsoever. Some editorials called it "depraved and inhumane", and stated that "Konami should be ashamed". It was also listed in the "Top ten most controversial games of 2009".
2009	Left 4 Dead 2	Xbox 360, PC (Steam)	Valve	The cover art in the UK had to be altered due to a potentially offensive hand gesture being depicted. The game was initially banned in Australia for its excessive violence and gore, but the uncensored version was later rated R18+ in 2014. The game's New Orleans setting so soon after Hurricane Katrina was considered "a bad call".
2009	Fat Princess	PlayStation 3 PlayStation Portable	Titan Studios, Sony Computer Entertainment	Critics argued that the game concept and title were hostile to women.
2009	Call of Duty: Modern Warfare 2	PS3, Xbox 360, PC,	Infinity Ward, Activision	Main article: Controversies surrounding Call of Duty: Modern Warfare 2 An optional mission in the game entitled "No Russian" has the player assume control of an undercover Central Intelligence Agency operative, joining a group of Russian nationalist terrorists who perpetrate an airport massacre. The player is given the option to skip it at any point, and a message before the campaign also warns players of the disturbing material. The game was discussed briefly in the House of Commons of the United Kingdom after the issue was brought to the attention of MP Keith Vaz, a longtime opponent of violence in video games, with fellow Labour Party politician Tom Watson arguing that the level was "no worse than scenes in many films and books" and criticising Vaz for "collaborating with the Daily Mail to create moral panic over the use of video games". The mission was made optional before release. Some countries have removed the mission in their versions of the game. Activision later removed the Favela multiplayer map from Modern Warfare 2 following complaints from Muslim gamers, which shows picture frames on the second floor bathroom of one building within Favela. When viewed through a scoped weapon, the frames contain a quote from Muhammad that translates to "Allah is beautiful and He loves beauty", according to Islam Today. One of the paintings is located directly above a toilet.

== 2010s ==
Release date	Title	Platform	Developer/Publisher	Reason(s)
2010	Medal of Honor	PS3, Xbox 360, PC	Danger Close Games, Electronic Arts (EA Digital Illusions CE)	The multiplayer mode created controversy when it was revealed that players could play as the Taliban. The developers responded by stating that the reality of the game necessitated it, but due to pressure from various military officials and veterans organizations, the word "Taliban" was subsequently removed from the multiplayer part of the game in which players would directly play as the Taliban, instead replaced with the term "Opposing Force." However, even in light of this change, the game is still not to be sold on military bases. The AAFES Commander Maj. Gen. Bruce Casella said, "Out of respect to those touched by the ongoing, real-life events presented as a game, Exchanges will not be carrying this product." He continued, "I expect the military families who are authorized to shop the Exchange are aware, and understanding, of the decision not to carry this particular offering."
2010	Six Days in Fallujah	PS3, Xbox 360, PC	Atomic Games, Highwire Games	A game to have been set during the Second Battle of Fallujah, Six Days was met with criticism by war veterans from the United Kingdom, as well as from a British pressure group, Stop the War Coalition. The game was subsequently cancelled in 2010 by its original developers Atomic Games. In 2021, a new studio Highwire Games announced they were reviving the game, but had spoken to over 100 veterans of the battle to make sure it is an accurate depiction of the events.
2010 (start of development)	School Shooter: North American Tour 2012	PC	Checkerboarded Studios	An uncompleted mod for Half-Life 2 hosted by Mod DB, School Shooter was condemned in the mainstream media and within industry publications for making a violent video game where the protagonist is a school shooter who kills defenseless targets. In response to the controversy, Mod DB pulled the game from its website.
2011	Bulletstorm	PS3, Xbox 360, PC	Electronic Arts	Fox News Channel called out the title as the "Worst Video Game in the World" due to the extreme amount of violence; claims made in the original article were dispelled by video game journalists, including Rock Paper Shotgun, but Fox News continues to assert that the game is too violent.
2011	Homefront	PS3, Xbox 360, PC	Kaos Studios	Japanese publisher Spike removed references to North Korea and Kim Jong-il to comply with CERO guidelines renaming them to "A Certain Country to the North" (北の某国) and the "Northern Leader" (北の指導者) respectively. They stated that to "use their real names would have been 'malicious' to an 'existing person' and an 'existing country.'" The game is also banned in South Korea for its negative portrayal of a unified Korea under Northern rule.
2011	Call of Juarez: The Cartel	PS3, Xbox 360, PC	Ubisoft	Residents of Ciudad Juárez and Mexico protested the announcement of the game, believing it to highlight the Juárez Cartel, who are believed to be responsible for over 3,000 homicides in the city in 2010.
2011	We Dare	PS3, Wii	Ubisoft Milan	The "adult party game" received a 12 rating by PEGI, and a PG rating by the ACB, implying that the game is suitable for children, despite Ubisoft intending it be played by adults and requesting an M rating from the ACB. This drew criticism for both rating boards considering the questionable content in the trailer for the game. Consequently, Ubisoft shelved plans for a North American and UK release (despite it eventually releasing in the UK), while also blocking the trailer from being viewed on YouTube.
2011	Dead Island	PS3, Xbox 360, PC	Deep Silver	After a development build of the game was released on Steam by mistake, it was revealed that the skill 'Gender Wars' (which the character Purna uses) was called 'FeministWhorePurna' within the game's code. Developer Deep Silver apologised, and released a patch for the game to replace the offensive name.
2011 (start of development)	Star Citizen	PC	Cloud Imperium Games	A crowdfunded game, Star Citizen has attracted criticism for the constant, frequent delays of the game's release deadlines, while continuing to raise additional funds, with the developers facing legal actions from Derek Smart and Crytek, as well as taking similar legal actions against critics of the development and funding practices associated with the game.
2012	Counter-Strike: Global Offensive	PS3, Xbox 360, PC (Steam)	Valve	In 2016, the game came under fire on the grounds of several players using third-party betting through the use of skin gambling, wherein players sell in-game cosmetics for real currency. This led to concerns of potential underage players participating in "skin gambling", which may lead to future gambling addictions, as well as the potential of match fixing within the game's competitive scene (see iBUYPOWER and NetcodeGuides.com match fixing scandal). Valve has since ordered a cease and desist against many Counter-Strike gambling websites. The game also was denounced by consumer rights' organization Facua, who asked that ETA symbology would be removed prior to the game's release, alleging sensibility and respect to the memory of the victims and their relatives. The game allows to emulate terrorists denominated "Separatists", who are depicted wearing white hoods and black berets, such as the ones worn by ETA during their communicates.
2012	Street Fighter X Tekken	PS3, Xbox 360, PC, iOS, PlayStation Vita	Capcom, Dimps	It was revealed that the game's downloadable characters were already on the disc in a ready-to-unlock form, leading to heavy criticism.
2012	Persona 4 Arena	PS3, Xbox 360	Atlus, Arc System Works	The PlayStation 3 version of the game includes a regional lockout, allowing the game to be played only if the game's region matches the console region, despite the fact that PlayStation 3 games are normally region-free, leading to a massive fan outrage. The game's sequel, Persona 4 Arena Ultimax however, is region-free.
2013	Payday 2	PS4, Xbox One, PC, Nintendo Switch	Overkill Software	Payday 2, while having featured a large array of downloadable content, had been claimed by its developers would never include microtransactions. However, a major game update released in October 2015 included rewards that required the player to use real-world money to purchase keys to unlock, and with rewards that may not be usable if the player did not buy certain pieces of downloadable content. Fans of the game reacted negatively to the change. In May 2016, Overkill was able to acquire full rights to the Payday series, and among other announcements relating to the series, announced they would remove the microtransactions from Payday 2.
2013	Tomb Raider	PS3, Xbox 360, PC	Crystal Dynamics	During an interview with Kotaku, executive producer Ron Rosenberg stated that one scene in the game depicts Lara Croft about to be sexually assaulted by a scavenger. She is forced to fight back and kill him in self-defense. Prior to the game's release, this quickly led to controversy concerning the possible "attempted rape" sequence. Studio manager Darrell Gallagher later denied this, stating that one of "the character defining moments for Lara in the game, which has incorrectly been referred to as an 'attempted rape' scene is the content we showed", where "Lara is forced to kill another human for the first time. In this particular selection, while there is a threatening undertone in the sequence and surrounding drama, it never goes any further than the scenes that we have already shown publicly. Sexual assault of any kind is categorically not a theme that we cover in this game."
2013	Saints Row IV	Xbox 360, PlayStation 3, PC	Volition	Despite changes in the Australian Classification Board to adopt rules to use the R18+ rating for video games in January 2013, Saints Row IV was the first video game under these new rules to be denied classification, due to the presence of drug use and an in-game alien anal probe weapon. Volition eliminated these elements from the game to obtain a MA15+ rating by removing the mission these elements were used in, thus rendering the game's co-operative mode incompatible with versions from other countries.
2013	The Stanley Parable	PC	Galactic Cafe	An in-game instructional video called "Choice" contained an image of a white man lighting a black child on fire.
2014	South Park: The Stick of Truth	Xbox 360, PlayStation 3, PC	Obsidian Entertainment, South Park Digital Studios	The game was censored (by Ubisoft's decision) in Europe and Australia due to its depiction of an anal probing by aliens, and the player-character performing an abortion. In their place, the game displays either a still image of a statue holding its face in its hand, or a crying koala, with an explicit description of events depicted in the scene. The German version was specifically censored due to the use of Nazi- and Hitler-related imagery, including swastikas and Nazi salutes, which are prohibited under German law, outside of the context of "art or science, research or teaching". The PC version remains completely uncut in Europe.
2015	8:46	PC	Anthony Krafft	A simulation game set during the September 11 attacks in which the player character is an office employee on floor 101 of 1 World Trade Center. The game concludes with the player character choosing to die either from smoke inhalation or from jumping out of a window. The game drew public backlash for its subject matter, with reviewers chastising it as "disrespectful", "horrifying", "distasteful," and "offensive." The game additionally drew outcry from families of the real attacks' victims, who described it as exploitative of the event.
2015	Hotline Miami 2: Wrong Number	PC	Dennaton Games	The sequel, like the first Hotline Miami, incorporates a large amount of violence as the player sets to kill off agents of the local mafia, but a preview build for the sequel includes a scene that is set up wherein the player's character then appears to rape a female antagonist, though this is later presented in the context of being part of a staged movie scene. Journalists felt that even though the game made it clear of the scene's setup, the inclusion of this scene went too far in taste levels. Despite some changes and assurances made by the developer, the scene in the game caused the Australian Classification Board to refuse to classify the game, effectively preventing legal sale of the title in that country.
2015	Hatred	PC	Destructive Creations	A game about a suicidal mass murderer, in which the primary mechanic is about shooting innocent civilians in the murderer's fit of rage. The CEO behind Hatred has been accused of having neo-Nazi and anti-Islamic affiliations, due to liking some pages on Facebook related to such beliefs. The title has been highly controversial, and when the developers attempted to place it on the Steam Greenlight service, it was pulled by Valve due to the game's content; however, it has been brought back onto Greenlight by Gabe Newell, who apologized for the removal. The game was rated "Adults Only" (AO) by the ESRB, which prevents retail sales and its release on consoles, and would likely prevent its sale on digital storefronts for personal computers.
2015	Playing History 2 - Slave Trade	PC	Serious Games	The game was created by Serious Games as an edutainment title to teach the user about slave trading. One game mode in the title was called "Slave Tetris", with the goal to try to fit as many African slaves on a boat as possible, using gameplay similar to Tetris; the developer had intended to show how inhumane the slave traders were, and how such trade boats were packed to capacity, stating "it really gets people to think about just how absurd and cruel it is". When the mode was discovered by a wider audience due to discounted sales of the game and Let's Play broadcasts of it, many critics expressed distaste for the mode, considering it to be highly insensitive. The developer pulled the mode from the game following this outrage.
2015	Survival Island 3	iOS and Android	NIL Entertainment	A first-person action game in which the white player-character has to fight and kill Indigenous Australians while destroying Australian fauna. After a Change.org petition, the game was pulled from the App Store and Google Play.
2015	Pakistan Army Retribution	Android		A first-person shooter game, based upon the 2014 Peshawar school massacre. Developed as part of the Peaceful Pakistan peace campaign, the game allowed the player to control a soldier during the attack and kill Taliban terrorists. After a negative review on the website of newspaper DAWN, calling the game to be of "poor taste", other people also expressed criticism. The game was subsequently pulled from the Google Play Store in January 2016.
2016	IS Defense	Microsoft Windows	Destructive Creations	A tower defense game based on an alternative historical timeline where the Islamic State takes over all of the Middle East and North Africa in the year 2020, the user playing as a stationary NATO machine-gun operator having to kill as many Islamic State militants on ground and sea with the player going through levels of real life areas including Sicily, Spain, and Croatia. The game was considered Islamophobic and xenophobic by some due to the implications of an Islamic takeover of Europe.
2016	Overwatch	Microsoft Windows, PlayStation 4, Xbox One	Blizzard Entertainment	A team-based multiplayer shooter which includes a number of unique characters, and matches concluded with the winning character doing one of several possible victory poses that can be selected by the player. Some players found that the victory pose for one character (a young woman named Tracer who is also shown on the game's cover art) was overtly sexual, and reduced the character to a "bland female sex symbol". Blizzard removed the offending pose, replacing it with a pin-up model-inspired pose.
2016	Street Fighter V	PlayStation 4, Microsoft Windows	Capcom, Dimps	An update for the PC version of the game released in September 2016 included a device driver named Capcom.sys, as a part of the game's anti-cheat measures, which was seen by players and security analysts as a rootkit. Capcom has since provided a rollback. In 2017, an update which added M. Bison's classic Street Fighter II stage was taken down after fans noticed Islamic chants in what was actually a Buddhist temple. A scene featuring the wrestler R. Mika slapping her butt as part of her Critical Art attack taunt was removed from the North American version of the game, as well as the entrance animation for Cammy. This caused debate in the community over whether or not the game was being censored. Producer Yoshinori Ono clarified it was an internal decision to remove her taunt, and not due to response from the community."
2016	Baldur's Gate: Siege of Dragonspear	Microsoft Windows	Beamdog	Siege of Dragonspear is an expansion atop Beamdog's Baldur's Gate: Enhanced Edition, itself a remastering of the original 1998 game, providing a narrative to explain events between Baldur's Gate and its sequel. Though the game was criticized by players on its release due to a number of software bugs, a controversy arose at what was perceived as a forced political agenda by the developers, in particular the inclusion of a transgender character.
2016	Pokémon Go	iOS, Android	Niantic, Inc., Nintendo	Main article: Pokémon Go § Criticism and incidents Pokémon Go gained significant controversy after the game allegedly inspired criminals to commit robberies using the augmented reality feature. CNN reported that the geolocation feature was used for robbers to find and capture victims. There have been several deaths that occurred while playing the game, such as the death of a Japanese woman who was hit by a driver who was playing the game. In 2017, Jiansheng Chen, a Chinese-American grandfather, was shot and killed by a security guard while playing the game.
2016	No Man's Sky	Playstation 4, Microsoft Windows	Hello Games	Main article: No Man's Sky § Backlash over marketing No Man's Sky started significant controversy due to its state upon release and how this differed significantly with marketing statements made by the developers. Both critics and fans cited the many bugs and game-breaking glitches present alongside missing content and features not implemented despite marketing material mentioning or claiming those features would be available at launch.
2016	Persona 5	PlayStation 3, PlayStation 4	Atlus	Within the game's dialog includes scenes between Ryuji, a high school student, and two other effeminate men. Many fans of the series and critics commented poorly on these scenes as the characters were a stereotypical presentation of overly-sexualized gay males, and appeared to be inappropriate attempts at creating a sexual relationship between them and Ryuji as a minor. Due to these complaints, Atlus announced for release of the expanded content in Persona 5 Royal, released in Japan in 2019 and in Western regions in 2020, that they would alter these scenes with updated lines "for the current generation".
2017	Fight of Gods	Microsoft Windows	PQube	Fight of Gods was designed as a satirical fighting game between various religious and mythical gods or godlike figures. In September 2017, after Jesus was added as a playable character, the government of Malaysia considered the game "blasphemous", demanded Valve remove the game from Steam, and had its ISPs temporarily block the country's access to Steam. Valve eventually blocked sales of the game in Malaysia, allowing the service to be restored in the country.
2017	Star Wars Battlefront II	Microsoft Windows, PlayStation 4, Xbox One	Electronic Arts	In November 2017, the game received unfavorable critical attention when its loot box monetization scheme during its open beta period was revealed, which many felt was a "pay-to-win" scheme, since some loot box rewards directly influenced multiplayer gameplay. Electronic Arts revisited the loot box approach prior to launch to address those concerns. Just before the game's full launch, it was revealed that many of the playable heroes in the game would be locked until the player had earned enough in-game credits over time, or spent money on microtransactions to unlock them faster, further raising player criticism. Electronic Arts attempted to justify the change on the game's subforum at Reddit, but it was met with outrage, making that comment the most down-voted Reddit post of all time. Hours before the game's release, EA temporarily disabled all microtransactions for the game to review concerns by players, and to rework the in-currency systems after launch.
2018	Standoff	Microsoft Windows	Revived Games	Originally titled Active Shooter, the game was developed by Revived Games, and was published by Acid Games in June 2018 on Steam. The game presented a first-person shooter based on a fictional school shooting scenario, with the game's description stating that the player can choose to be the SWAT team member to take down the suspects, or the students firing on the school. The game, which appeared on Steam shortly following the Stoneman Douglas High School shooting in February 2018, came under criticism from students, parents, and politicians, directing concern towards the developers, publisher, and Valve for trying to profit off an emotional distressing situation. Before the game could be released, Valve pulled the game and the developer from Steam, citing prior issues with "asset reuse" games by the developer and manipulation of Steam reviews.
2018	Agony	PC, PS4, Xbox One, Nintendo Switch	Madmind Studio	A dark fantasy survival horror video game that puts players into the perspective of a tormented soul within the depths of Hell, devoid of any memories whatsoever about its past. The special ability to control people on their path, and possess weak-minded demons, gives players the necessary measures to survive in the extreme conditions they are in. Agony is infamous for being one of only four games to have received the "Adults Only" rating from ESRB due to violence and other extreme graphic content (including gay and lesbian sex scenes and genital physics), following The Punisher, Manhunt 2, and Hatred. The game was re-rated "Mature" after the developers agreed to tone down the violence, which also led to PEGI rating the game 18. A planned "Adults Only" unrated patch for PC was later dropped due to "legal issues". However, on June 6, 2018, the developers said they were "talking with Steam representatives" about offering Agony Unrated as "a separate title produced and published by Madmind Studio and without the involvement of any publishers." For those who already own the original game, this version will be either free DLC or a separate purchase at 99% off, which currently is the highest possible discount on Steam's platform. After announcing the financial problems of the company and canceling the Unrated version of the game, the basic game docked on August 1, 2018, with a considerable amount of updates on the platforms on which it debuted.
2018	Bolsomito 2K18	PC	BS Studios	Bolsomito 2K18, a brawler game where the player fights "the evils of communism", and "the growing corruption and inversion of values that plagues [sic] his society", according to its description, while in-game, this is represented as attacking women, minorities, and LGBTQ persons. The game was released on Steam two days prior to the October 2018 Brazilian general election, where one of the candidates in the election was Jair Bolsonaro, thus inspiring the game's name. Bolsonaro was considered a far-right candidate in the election, and led after the first round of voting. The Brazilian Public Ministry of the Federal District and Territories has opened an investigation on both Valve and BS Studios, stating that the game and its close release to the elections "clearly intends to harm [the] Presidency of the Republic and thereby embarrass the 2018 elections", and "cause collective moral damages to the movements social, gays and feminists".
2018	Assassin's Creed Odyssey	PC, PS4, Xbox One, Nintendo Switch, Stadia	Ubisoft	The main storyline in Assassin's Creed Odyssey features the ability to select one of two playable characters, the male Alexios or the female Kassandra, and gave players the ability to interact with non-player characters in various romance options, including gay relationships; this feature was stressed by Ubisoft in its promotional material for the game, given that they did not want to force the player into any specific relationship. In the finale of the game's downloadable content, Legacy of the First Blade, the player character is shown to have settled down after the main story and raised a child with a spouse of the opposite gender. This annoyed players who had chosen to role-play their character as gay in the original game. Ubisoft apologized, stating that they wanted to show how the character's bloodline continued into future generations of Assassins, but agreed to change the story. Ubisoft released an update in February 2019 that alters the end scenes, to show that those who opted to play their character as gay will enter into a non-romantic relationship with a spouse for the purpose of continuing the bloodline, retaining the romantic choices the player otherwise made before, as well as changing the achievement name for reaching this point from "Growing up" to "Blood of Leonidas" to avoid implications made by the former.
2019	Devotion	PC	Red Candle	The Taiwanese horror game Devotion drew backlash from Chinese players after two Easter eggs were discovered that mocked Chinese paramount leader Xi Jinping, who is also the General Secretary of the Chinese Communist Party. The first Easter egg consisted of a poster with text written on it referring to the president as a "Winnie-the-Pooh moron"; the children's literature character had previously been blocked online by the Chinese government for being heavily featured in Internet memes comparing him to Xi. The second Easter egg consisted of a newspaper describing the incarceration of an individual under the alias "Steamed Bun," a euphemism for Xi used by his critics to evade federal censorship. Following a review bombing campaign, developer Red Candle apologized for the Easter eggs' inclusion and stated that they would refund offended players. Reports from Chinese social media users also claimed that the game was pulled from Steam as a result of the controversy. In December 2020, Red Candle had worked with GOG.com to bring the game back through that service, but GOG.com opted not to sell the game, stating it had received "many messages from gamers" criticizing them for doing so. Red Candle Games opened their own digital storefront by March 2021 to sell Devotion and other games.
2019	Rape Day	PC	Desk Plant	Rape Day was listed as an upcoming title on Steam around early March 2019; according to its description, Rape Day was a "dark comedy and power fantasy" visual novel that allowed the player to "[control] the choices of a menacing serial killer rapist during a zombie apocalypse." The game's store page included numerous warnings related to the content, including "violence, sexual assault, non-consensual sex, obscene language, necrophilia, incest, and the death of a baby". Many journalists quickly expressed concern about the game's content, based on the description and troubling screenshots and how it appeared to glorify rape, and opined that the game would be a type of litmus test of Valve's recently-developed hands-off policy in terms of Steam storefront curation, believing Valve should block the game. By March 6, 2019, Valve had issued a statement that it will not allow the game to be published on Steam, and removed its upcoming store page. In the company's statement, Valve said, "We respect developers' desire to express themselves, and the purpose of Steam is to help developers find an audience, but this developer has chosen content matter and a way of representing it that makes it very difficult for us to help them do that."
2019	Ion Fury	PC, PlayStation 4, Xbox One, Nintendo Switch	Voidpoint	Initially titled Ion Maiden, Ion Fury was forced to change its title when the game's publisher was challenged with a trademark infringement lawsuit by the band Iron Maiden. After release, players found language within the game that was considered by some to be homophobic: a bottle of lotion labeled "Ogay" (parodying the brand Olay) and an inaccessible room containing the word "fagbag", allegedly a spoof on the title of the Duke Nukem theme song. Additionally, players on the game's Discord server found that some of the developers had previously used language that is insensitive to transgender causes. Developer Voidpoint and publisher 3D Realms apologized for the poor language, and vowed to donate US$10,000 to The Trevor Project, as well as patch out the offensive content. A week later, facing backlash from confused players who thought the entire game was to be censored, Voidpoint and 3D Realms clarified that they were not censoring content intended to be included in the game, and were merely removing the offensive word found within the inaccessible area, though still stressing that the behavior on Discord was unacceptable.
2019	NBA 2K20	PlayStation 4, Xbox One, Nintendo Switch, PC, Stadia	2K Games	Prior to the game's own release, NBA 2K20 received severe backlash for microtransactions components being advertised in a trailer which has blatant similarities to a casino. The heavy focus on these components in conjunction with the option to spend real-world currency on it has also caused many to criticize both PEGI and the ESRB for giving the game each organization's lowest possible age rating despite both boards claiming that gambling content, simulated or not, would warrant a significantly higher age rating.

== 2020s ==
Release date	Title	Platform	Developer/Publisher	Reason(s)
2020	Animal Crossing: New Horizons	Nintendo Switch	Nintendo (Nintendo EPD)	The game was pulled from Chinese online digital sales as it allowed users to create their own displays in game, some which were used to support the 2019–20 Hong Kong protests.
2020	Cooking Mama: Cookstar	Nintendo Switch, PlayStation 4	1st Playable Productions, Planet Entertainment	The game was released without any approval of the IP holder Office Create, which started a legal dispute against the game's publisher Planet Entertainment, resulting in the removal of the game on the Nintendo eShop and an extremely limited print run.
2020	EA Sports UFC 4	PlayStation 4, Xbox One	Electronic Arts (EA Vancouver)	The game, released as a standard premium title, was updated about a month after launch to include short but full screen in-game advertisements from third-parties. Fans complained to Electronic Arts, who stated that while they had used ads for the game itself, they recognized the negative feedback from players over these third-party ads, and disabled them within a few days.
2020	Genshin Impact	Android, iOS, PlayStation 4, Windows, PlayStation 5, Xbox Series X/S	MiHoYo	A free-to-play action role-playing game, supported through monetization including loot boxes. The U.S. Federal Communication Commission found that Genshin Impact improperly targeted loot boxes to players under 16 years old with the use of dark patterns and failed to properly disclose the odds of acquiring certain items from loot boxes. MiHoYo settled with the FCC in January 2025 for $50 million and stated it planned significant changes to comply with the FCC.
2020	Cyberpunk 2077	Microsoft Windows, PlayStation 4, PlayStation 5, Xbox One, Xbox Series X and Series S, Nintendo Switch 2	CD Projekt	Cyberpunk 2077 was a highly anticipated game which had been planned for release in April 2020, but was pushed back until December 2020 due to technical issues and the COVID-19 pandemic. The game as released performed well enough on the Windows platform, but the game's performance on the PlayStation 4 and Xbox One was considered extremely poor; none of the pre-release material for the game showed the game working on these consoles, and players complained that they were led to believe the game would play as well on the older platforms. CD Projekt admitted that they failed to test these versions as well as they had the other ports, and assisted players in trying to get refunds for digital purchases, despite Sony and Microsoft initially refusing to provide these. Within a week of release, Sony announced they would refund purchases of the PlayStation 4 version of the game and removed the game from digital purchase until further notice.
2021	Boyfriend Dungeon	Microsoft Windows, Nintendo Switch, Xbox One, Xbox Series X and Series S	Kitfox Games	Boyfriend Dungeon is a role-playing game mixed with a dating simulator, in which the potential romantic interests are generally male characters that can turn into weapons that can be used within dungeons. In a late stage of the game, one of these characters engages in stalking and emotional manipulation of the player-character, which some players felt was inappropriately disturbing, and not adequately warned about in the game's content warnings. Developer Kitfox Games agreed to update the game's content warnings and storefront pages to alert players about these potentially troublesome topics.
2022	Diablo Immortal	iOS/Android, Windows	Blizzard Entertainment	Diablo Immortal was originally announced as an exclusive mobile title for the Diablo series at the 2018 BlizzCon event. Attendees at the event booed the presentation in response, and fans took to social media to express discontentment with the announcement. The situation was further inflamed when Kotaku had claimed that inside sources informed them that Blizzard had pulled a Diablo 4 announcement at the last minute, which Blizzard refuted the next day. Following its release on June 2, 2022, Diablo Immortal faced widespread criticism over its use of microtransactions. Players alleged that the game is designed to be "pay-to-win" because it is supposedly harder for players to progress through its later stages without paying real-world money. As of June 2022, the game held the lowest ever user rating score for a game on Metacritic.
2022	Beat Refle	Nintendo Switch, Microsoft Windows	qureate	The game was originally titled Massage Freaks and slated for release on Nintendo Switch on August 4, 2022. It received criticism for its depiction of women, which was considered discriminatory and reminiscent of real-world sexual crimes at massage parlors in Japan. It was also noted that female characters in the game shared their first names with members of the idol group Hinatazaka46. Following the criticism, qureate delayed the Switch release indefinitely, cancelled preorders, and changed the characters' names. beat refle was silently released on Steam on July 31, 2022, albeit censored.
2023	Hogwarts Legacy	PlayStation 4, PlayStation 5, Windows, Xbox One, Xbox Series X/S, Nintendo Switch	Warner Bros. Games	The game attracted controversy as part of the Harry Potter franchise, which has been criticized for antisemitic tropes involving goblins as well as series creator J.K. Rowling's controversial views on transgender people.
2023	Simulador de Escravidão	Android	MagnusGames	A Brazilian simulation mobile game where players can, according to the developer "exchange, buy and sell slaves". It has been called racist in Brazilian discourse and Google has since removed the game from the Play Store.
2023	The Coffin of Andy and Leyley	PC	Nemlei, Kit9 Studio	An indie game that received backlash on social media for its depiction of incest between the titular Andy and Leyley (as well as their mother on occasions).
2025	No Mercy	Windows	Zerat Games	An adult visual novel that featured controversial sexual themes including incest and rape. The Australian activist group Collective Shout campaigned for the removal of the game. After a complaint from UK technology secretary Peter Kyle, Steam removed the game for sale in the UK. The game was also removed for sale in Australia and Canada. On April 10, No Mercy's developer opted to remove the game for sale globally, stating "We don't intend to fight the whole world, and specifically, we don't want to cause any problems for Steam and Valve."
2025	InZOI	Windows	Krafton	A life simulation game currently in early access that has drawn criticism for its use of Generative AI. Krafton has gone on board to claim that their AI model is proprietary and not trained on copyrighted materials.
2025	Marvel Rivals	Windows, PlayStation 5, Xbox Series X/S	NetEase Games	Released in 2025, the game came under fire for censoring chat terms such as "free Taiwan", "Tiananmen Square", and "Winnie-the-Pooh" to comply with Chinese regulations and appease NetEase and local censorship policies.
2025	Horses	Windows	Santa Ragione	Horses use mixed media where the player takes the role of a farmhand, though where the horses are naked humans in horse masks. The developers intended the game to be about "the burden of familial trauma and puritan values, the dynamics of totalitarian power, and the ethics of personal responsibility", and not pornographic in any way. Despite this, the title was removed from Steam back in 2023, with an automated message from Valve stating it wouldn't "distribute content that appears, in [its] judgement, to depict sexual conduct involving a minor.". Valve refused to elaborate on what part they were referring to, despite Santa Ragione's clarity on the game's message. Valve has also refused to look at newer builds of the game, and has de facto banned them from the Steam store permanently. Epic Games similarly banned the game from release on the Epic Games Store a few days before release despite previous approval. Though the game is expected to be distributed on other storefronts.
2025	Fatal Fury: City of the Wolves	PlayStation 4, PlayStation 5, Xbox Series X/S, Windows	SNK	Fatal Fury: City of the Wolves features professional athlete Cristiano Ronaldo as a playable character, which has led to backlash from fans and critics due to a history of controversies surrounding him. Many people believe his inclusion to be the result of influence from the Saudi Arabian government, as SNK has been owned by the Misk Foundation operated by Crown Prince of Saudi Arabia Mohammed bin Salman since 2022.
2026	Yakuza Kiwami 3 & Dark Ties	Nintendo Switch 2, PlayStation 4, PlayStation 5, Xbox Series X/S, Windows	Ryu Ga Gotoku Studio, Sega	The casting of Teruyuki Kagawa in Yakuza Kiwami 3 as Hamazaki received criticism due to reported allegations of the actor's sexual misconduct towards women. Within the Yakuza fandom, Kagawa's inclusion was significantly controversial, leading numerous fans to demand that the actor be recast, under the banner of the hashtag "#REMOVEKAGAWA". Director Ryosuke Horii addressed the casting in an interview, stating that Kagawa had been chosen for the role because he was believable as "a creep" and that the studio was not concerned with any criticism for recasting the character. The game also received backlash over removing the "Talking to Me" questline featuring a transgender woman from the original game, among other side quests.

== See also ==
- List of banned video games
- List of regionally censored video games
- List of video games notable for negative reception
