= Rape Day =

- Developer: Desk Plant
- Publisher: Desk Plant
- Platform: Windows
- Release: Cancelled
- Genre: Visual novel

Rape Day is a cancelled indie adult visual novel developed by Desk Plant and originally intended to be released in April 2019. The story focuses on a serial killer and rapist who, during a zombie apocalypse, rapes and kills women. The game courted controversy online, where petitions for the game to be removed earned widespread support, and its page was removed from Steam in March 2019 before it was able to be released.

== Development ==
Rape Day was a visual novel that used branching dialogues to progress the story, which revolved around a sociopathic serial killer and rapist, controlled by the player, who would be able to harass, rape, and kill various women during a zombie apocalypse. Its developer, a man named Jake who went by the aliases Desk Lamp and Desk Plant, described the game as a dark comedy inspired by various horror books and psychological thrillers. During the development process, he removed a scene in which a baby is murdered in order to avoid having the game labeled as child exploitation. The game's scenes were 3D rendered, and it reportedly had over 7,000 words and 500 images. A warning on the game's Steam page marked the game as having mature content including sexual assault, necrophilia, and incest. Screenshots of the game showed naked women being held at gunpoint and being sexually assaulted, among other things.

On the game's website, Desk Plant wrote that the game was intended for a "niche audience", including the "4% of the general population [that] are sociopaths". In defense of the game, he wrote that "banning rape in fiction" would require "banning murder and torture", adding, "Most people can separate fiction from reality pretty well, and those that can't shouldn't be playing video games." He also listed plans for the game in case it was banned from Steam, which included "reaching out to other quality developers whose game(s) were banned ... to organise a niche site where you can purchase porn games that are too morally reprehensible for Steam".

The game was planned for released in April through Steam Direct. Nick Statt of The Verge stated that Steam's reputation as "a go-to distributor for all manner of violent, disturbing gaming content you cannot easily find elsewhere" as a result of Valve's "more codified hands-off approach" was a reason for the developer's choice to upload Rape Day to Steam. Valve had stated in a 2018 blog post that it would only remove games from Steam if they were determined to be illegal or "straight up trolling", the latter of which had previously been used as justification for removing the school shooting simulation video game Active Shooter in 2018, but that it would "allow everything" else and that games in the store would "not be a reflection of Valve's values". According to an update made on the game's Steam page by Desk Plant, the review process for the game, which was done manually by Valve in order to determine whether or not it would be released on Steam, was "taking longer than expected". Prior to its being taken down, players were able to add the game to their Steam wish list, and the game was marked as "adult only".

== Controversy and cancellation ==
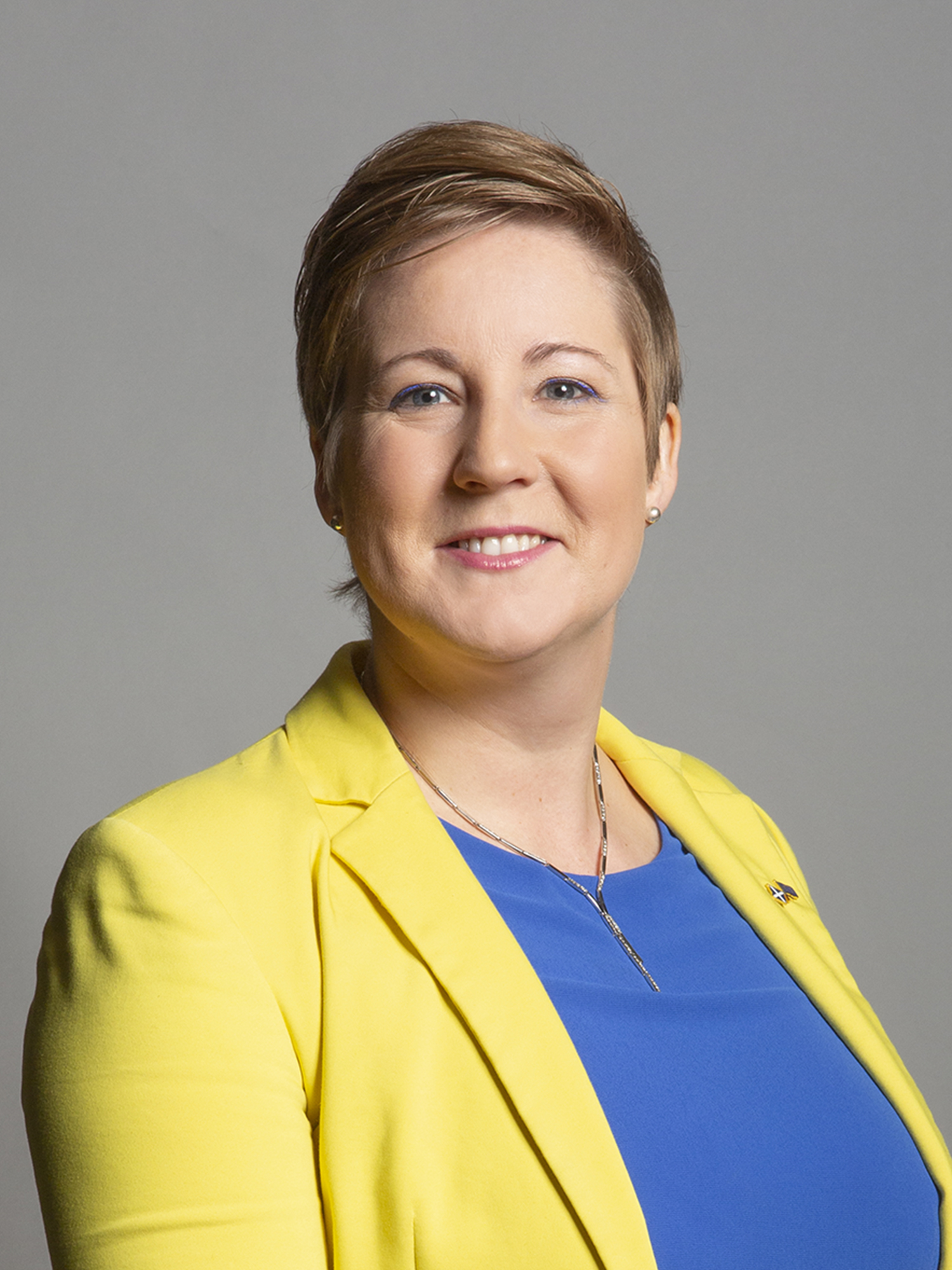
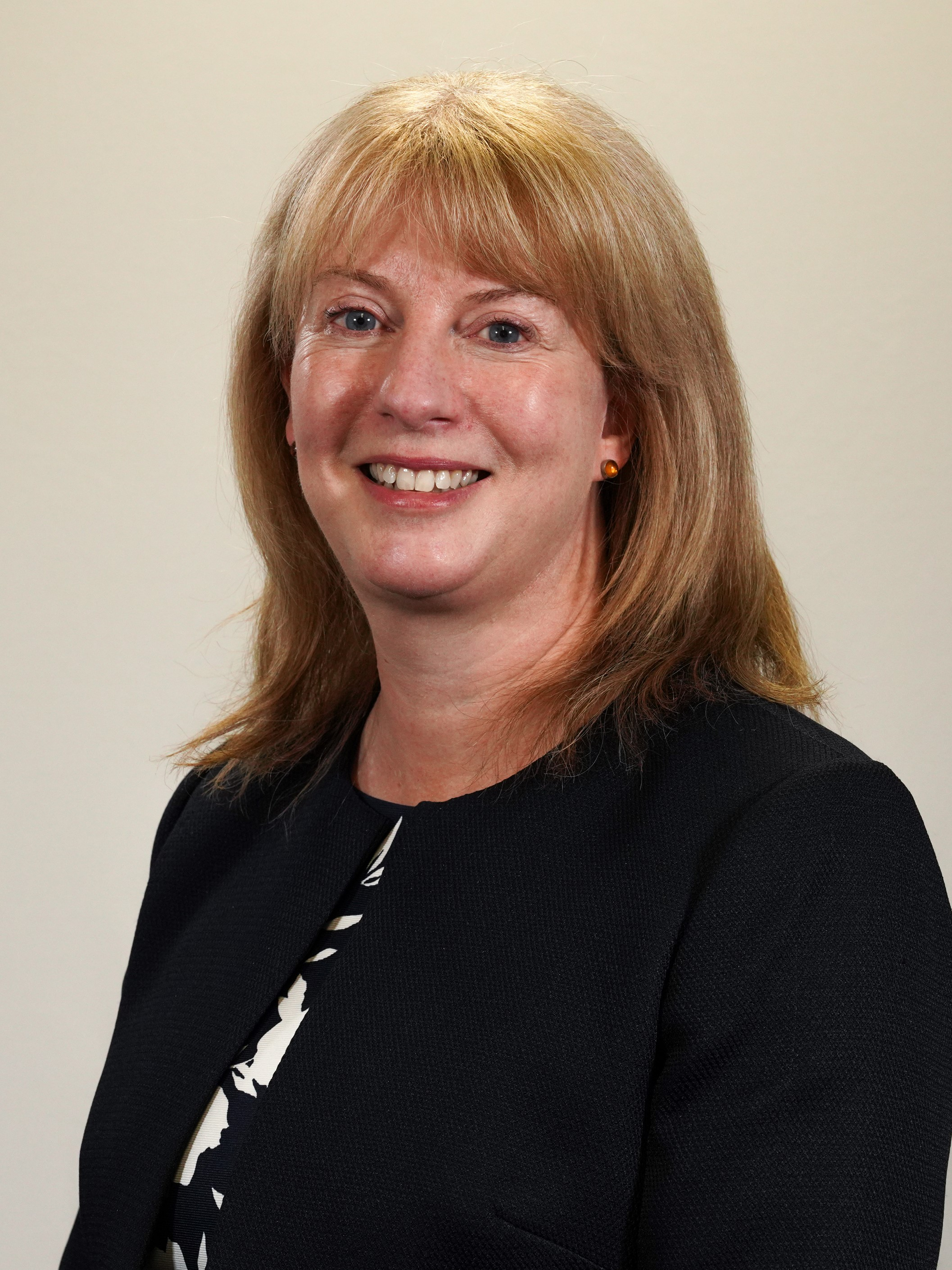
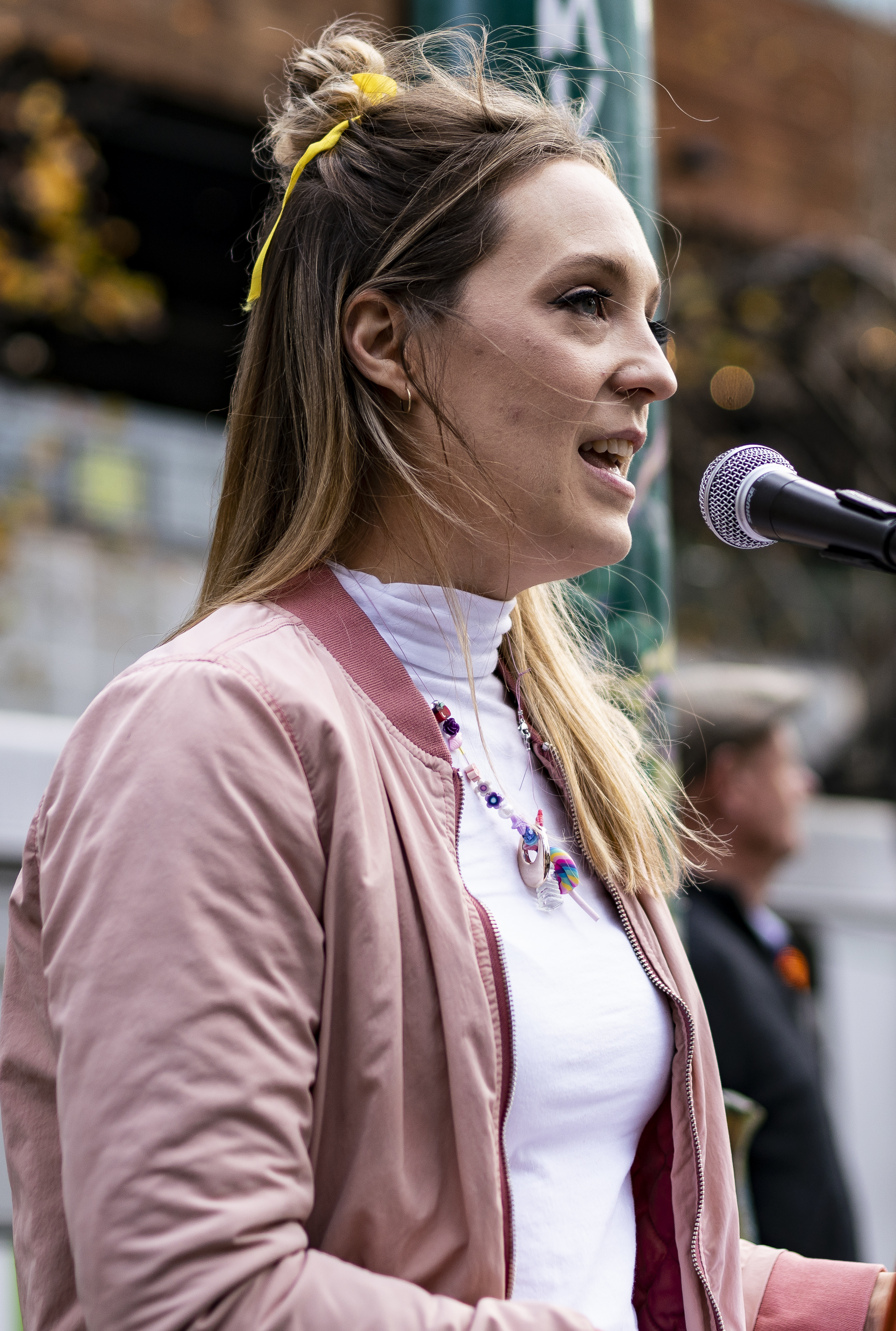
Rape Day's detractors included Scottish politicians Hannah Bardell (left) and Shona Robison (center), who called for the UK government to review how the game made it to development, and Change.org executive director Sally Rugg (right).

The game received widespread backlash online prior to its scheduled release due to its depiction and apparent promotion of sexual violence against women. Multiple petitions were created on Change.org demanding that the game not be distributed; one petition started by Canadian gamer Cecilia Cosenza eventually received over 128,000 signatures, making it, as of 2022, the fourth most-signed video game-related petition on the website. Another petition received over three thousand signatures and online support from Change.org's executive director Sally Rugg. British Member of Parliament Hannah Bardell and Member of the Scottish Parliament Shona Robison called for the UK government to review how the game made it to development, while the game's Steam page was filled with comments asking for Valve to take action and criticizing its developer. Valve automatically censored the word "rape" in any comments users made on the game's page.

In a post made to the Steam Blog in March 2019, Valve announced that it would not be distributing Rape Day due to the game posing "unknown costs and risks" and clarified that its distribution policy was "reactionary", requiring them to "wait and see what comes to [them] via Steam Direct". Valve went on to write, "We respect developers' desire to express themselves ... but this developer has chosen content matter and a way of representing it that makes it very difficult for us to help them do that."

Patrick Shanley of The Hollywood Reporter called the game's removal "a polarizing moment in gaming". Valve's statement was criticized online by critics and consumers for not taking a stronger stance against Rape Day, with multiple critics suggesting that it seemed as though they did not actually want to cancel the game. Kotaku's Nathan Grayson called Valve's statement "vague", "nonsensical", and "unclear", criticizing the company's release policy as "a mess". During a meeting of the House of Commons's Digital, Culture, Media and Sport Committee, Bardell called Steam's response "woeful". Some Reddit users responded negatively to the game's removal due to what they considered censorship.

In an update made to the game's Steam page before its deletion, Desk Plant wrote that they would attempt to find another way to distribute the game. He also stated that Steam's decision was motivated by their being a "reactionary company" and not by any policy. Desk Plant later stated that he "might agree with Steam that [his] game is not the right fit for a distribution site that is marketed at the general masses and children", and that he had plans to sell the game from his own website.

In 2020, The Independent listed Rape Day as one of the most controversial video games of all time.

== See also ==
- RapeLay
- No Mercy
