= Survival Island (disambiguation) =

Survival Island is a 2005 erotic thriller survival film.

Survival Island may also refer to:

- Survival Island 3, a 2015 video game
- Piñata: Survival Island, or Demon Island, a 2002 horror film
