= 8:46 =

8:46 may refer to:

- 8 minutes 46 seconds, a symbol of police brutality associated with the murder of George Floyd
- 8:46 (special), a 2020 performance special by American comedian Dave Chappelle about violence against African Americans
- 8:46 (video game), a video game based on the September 11 attacks, named after the exact time that American Airlines Flight 11 crashed into the North Tower
