= Women's Forum Australia =

Think tank

Women's Forum Australia (WFA) is a conservative think tank established in 2005 with the stated aim of "research, education and public policy development on social, economic, health and cultural issues affecting women". It has also been described as focusing on "anti-trans campaigning", with members campaigning against abortion access, transgender rights, and promoting conspiracy theories around Wi-Fi.

== Activities ==
Women's Forum Australia has been active in combatting negative stereotyping of women. The group has been characterised as "pro-life", and has similarly been involved in matters relating to IVF. It has advocated legislative changes to advance adoption as an alternative to abortion. The group was involved in the effort to ban the distribution of RapeLay, a video game that featured sexual violence.

In 2007, the group released a magazine Faking it, dealing with the sexualisation of women and girls facilitated by the fashion and beauty industries.

In 2013, chair of WFA Louise Brosnan withdrew her children from school over concerns about the presence of Wi-Fi at the school. Another board member, Dr Marie-Therese Gibson, resigned as principal of Tangara School for Girls, claiming health dangers of Wi-Fi.

In 2023, WFA led a campaign against Big W's stocking of Welcome to Sex, a sex education book aimed at adolescents. In response to abuse of staff members, Big W removed the book from its physical stores while continuing to sell it on their website.

== People ==
Activist Melinda Tankard Reist was a founding director of the group.
