= VR Kanojo =

Virtual reality simulation game

- Developer: Illusion
- Publisher: Illusion
- Engine: Unity
- Platform: Windows 7 / 8.1 / 10
- Release: JP: 28 February 2017; WW: 9 April 2018 (Steam)
- Genre: Social simulation
- Mode: Single-player

VR Kanojo (VR カノジョ; transl. VR Girlfriend) is a virtual reality (VR) eroge social simulation video game made by Illusion, released in February 2017 for the HTC Vive and Oculus Rift on Microsoft Windows PCs. VR Kanojo is the successor to Illusion's 2010 game REAL Kanojo, and follows a similar premise where the player is allowed to interact with a virtual girlfriend. It has been described as similar to Bandai Namco's Summer Lesson.

== Gameplay ==
VR Kanojo gives the player a virtual girlfriend and several scenarios with which to spend time with her. The player interacts with Sakura Yuuhi – a young Japanese girl – in her bedroom. The game is played through a virtual reality headset, with VR controllers simulating the player's hands in-game. The player can answer questions by nodding or shaking their head. The player can customize the girl's appearance with various outfits, can touch the girl and can engage in virtual sex through explicit sexual scenarios, including handjobs, blowjobs and vaginal intercourse.

The rendering in this work is structured across five levels, with the highest level, "high quality," offering detailed mapping, including the texture of Sakura's skin.

== Collaborations ==
In May 2018, Illusion adapted VR Kanojo to work with ANTVR's "MIX" headset, to provide an augmented reality experience. Illusion and Tokyo-based startup Vaqso collaborated at Unite 2017 to allow VR Kanojo players to use the odor emitting "Vaqso VR" attachment to smell the game character's stockings.

== Reception ==
In a review for Kotaku, Kate Gray writes: "And VR Kanojo gives you what you want: full-blown sex, slightly pixelated but still realistic. But it gives you more than that: it gives you a feeling of intimacy. [...] Perhaps it's possible to virtually replicate intimacy and love. When I'm lying in a virtual bed with a virtual girlfriend, maybe I can believe that."

== Successor ==
In September 2024, Illumination Inc. started crowdfunding for a new game building on VR Kanojo.

== See also ==
- List of eroge
- Sex and nudity in video games
