= Summertime Saga =

Adult erotic video game and dating simulator

- Developer: Kompas Productions
- Publisher: The Epic Seasonal
- Engine: Ren'Py Adobe Flash Player
- Platform: Android; Linux; macOS; Microsoft Windows
- Release: 2016; Stable: 0.20.16; Preview: 21.0.0-wip.7722
- Genre: Visual Novel
- Mode: Single-player

Summertime Saga is an adult visual novel being published by The Epic Seasonal, developed by Kompas Productions and run by pseudonymous developer DarkCookie. Its first public release was in August 2016 as a crowdfunded early access title on Patreon. It has since been the most funded game on the site since October 2017.

The game follows a young man navigating the challenges of his final year of high school while managing part-time jobs, unraveling the mystery tied to his late father's murder, and engaging in sexual relationships with many of the townspeople. It has received both scholarly attention and criticism for its treatment of a romanceable transgender character.

== Plot ==
Story takes place in a fictional city of 'Summerville'. (Note: Note: Throughout the progressive "Parts", the main character engages into several sexual acts and in one of the Parts, it is necessary to have one of the characters involved, to be impregnated, like in this case, Maria. Post or Mid storyline characters might also be engaged to have sex and conceive baby/-ies.)

The main character (Note: Prompted initially as Anon whose name can be [only] altered at the beginning of the game for first and only time) attends funeral of his father who was initially reported missing then confirmed dead, later revealed to have taken a heavy loan from a Russian mafia, led by Raz (Note: Fictionalized parody for Russian president Vladimir Putin) whom he failed to pay up. Post funeral condolences and a brief visit by police, The Protagonist and his foster family (Note: Earlier versions of the game had Debbie and Jenny being the protagonist's biological mother and sister respectively, this was altered as a result of Patreon updating their community guidelines to prohibit incest-themed pornographic content) are approached by Dmitri and Igor, members of the mafia to warn about pending extortion, and demand them the money The Protagonist's father kept hidden away from them. They soon start exploiting The Protagonist for the money he earns (through various means and savings in gameplay) until they're fended off by Tony (later on revealed to be a former Italian mafia boss), who now runs his fast-food restaurant in Summerville. Another incident of them roughing The Protagonist up leads to his foster mother, Debbie, taking a loan of $250,000 by keeping their own house as collateral, which further complicates their mortgage problem.

Tony and his wife Maria help The Protagonist to start earnings only for the Russians to show up once again, this time at their restaurant to threaten their lives and 'settle score'. Since police cannot fully interfere despite evidence, Tony takes a step to help The Protagonist by rounding up Russians by locating their hideout and gather intel. Seeing the risk all it involves, The Protagonist on various stages is pleaded/warned/threatened from taking part into this mess. At the same time, the city is also being prepared for electing their next mayor, presently being Rump (Note: Fictionalized parody for American president Donald Trump).

Things get quirky when 'Kim' (Note: Fictionalized parody of North Korean supreme leader/dictator, Kim Jong Un) a salesman at Summervile Car Dealership is revealed to have a secret alliance with not just Rump but also in contact with Raz. The series these events take place simultaneously, revolve around corruption and authority greed. Progressive storyline gameplay finally lead to a 'final face off' when Tony decides to storm Russians' now-revealed hideout with his members. The Protagonist is asked to be kept away but when his foster mother Debbie and sister Jenny are abducted, he decides to take matters in his own hands and arrive along with Tony.

Evading the authorities who rounded up the factory hideout, he is assisted by Raz' daughter, Nadya, who reveals to be fed up by her father's dirty work and the drugs business. Tracing his foster family, The Protagonist finally faces Raz in a final act of fighting, where he succeeds to hold him at gunpoint but hesitates to kill him, citing him to be handed over to authorities; but just then Nadya snatches the weapon to shoot Raz and kill him once and for all. Having now inherited the power, she assures The Protagonist of protection and apparent 'pardon' because he assisted her.

Jenny and Debbie are freed, gang members of Raz are arrested, meanwhile Rump and Kim are also rounded up for their corruption and profits from Raz' activities. The factory hideout is renovated into a vodka manufacturing plant. Meanwhile, The Protagonist finally finds the hidden extortion money, to which he clears off all the debts of mafia and works out the mortgage of his house, and pay off his school fees for good. He visits his father's grave one last time to thank him for this journey and pays respects.

== Development ==
DarkCookie began developing Summertime Saga in 2016 using the Ren'Py engine, intended as a small-scale project to learn Python programming. He has claimed it was initially not intended to be an adult game but was moved in that direction based on feedback from early players. By 2018, it was earning $41,000 per month on Patreon, ranking as the fifth-most patronized project on the platform at the time, ahead of more-covered creators like musician Amanda Palmer. By 2021, its monthly earnings had surpassed $74,000 from over 29,000 patrons. The game's development is funded through a tiered Patreon model that provides backers with access to updates at different intervals.

== Gameplay ==
The Player assume the role of a nameable male protagonist in sandbox style game set in the fictional town of Summerville. The gameplay combines point-and-click mechanics with dialogue-driven storytelling and playable minigames. Unlike many adult games that use anime art styles or 3D models, Summertime Saga features cartoonish, hand-drawn visuals.

== Reception ==
By 2022, it ranked as the sixth-most searched video game on adult video-sharing website Pornhub and Rule 34, alongside mainstream titles like Overwatch and Minecraft.

The game's success has cemented its status as a flagship title in the Western adult gaming industry, influencing the growth of other crowdfunded erotic games.
