= RapeLay =

2006 video game

- Japanese cover art
- Developer: Illusion
- Publisher: Illusion
- Platform: Windows
- Release: JP: April 21, 2006
- Genres: Eroge, simulation
- Mode: Single-player

RapeLay (レイプレイ, Reipurei) is a 2006 3D eroge video game developed and published by Illusion. The game centers on a vengeful repeat sexual offender who stalks and rapes a mother and her two underage daughters. Three years after its initial release, the game garnered international attention and controversy for its content, resulting in it being banned in several countries.

== Gameplay ==
Screenshot of the in-game Chikan mode, depicting the player groping the final victim, Aoi Kiryū, on a subway.

The player controls Masaya Kimura, a serial sex offender.

The mouse is used to perform actions, such as undressing victims.

The game's Story mode centers around Masaya, who rapes (in consecutive order) Manaka, Yūko, and Aoi. After the protagonist finishes raping all three characters, the player unlocks Free Play mode, where Masaya can engage in sex with the same three characters in a variety of selectable stages.

== Plot ==
RapeLay follows Masaya Kimura, a man who sexually assaults a woman on a commuter train and is detained after a high school girl called Aoi Kiryū reports him. He is released due to his family's influence and plans to exact revenge by raping Aoi, her younger sister Manaka and her mother Yūko.

On the first day, Masaya targets Manaka. She tries to flee, but he traps her in a public bathroom, rapes her and takes photographs of her. Masaya instructs her to feign sickness and stay in her room the next day.

On the second day, Masaya forces Manaka to call her mother and send her to a park. He ambushes, abuses and takes pictures of her, then hands her over to his accomplices.

On the third day, Masaya blackmails Aoi using a picture of her tied-up mother. He forces her into a vehicle that he and his accomplices use to take her to a hotel owned by his family.

With all three captured, Masaya reveals his plans to make them his sex slaves. Despite Yūko's attempts to get her daughters free, he does not change his mind.

=== Endings ===
Both possible endings result in Masaya's death.

- Black Ending – It takes place if Masaya impregnates Manaka, Aoi or Yūko and decides to keep the child. A few days later, he falls onto the train tracks and is killed by a moving train.
- Red Ending – Aoi stabs Masaya many times while laughing. The game ends with Aoi being questioned by the police for the murder.

== Characters ==
- Masaya Kimura (鬼村 将哉, Kimura Masaya) – the game's protagonist and player character. He lacks a voice actor, instead communicating exclusively through on-screen text when progressing through the game's story.
- Manaka Kiryū (桐生 愛花, Kiryū Manaka) – the younger Kiryū sister at 12 years old. She has short black hair and wears a blue backless dress. Voiced by Natsumi Yanase (credited as "Izumi Maki").
- Aoi Kiryū (桐生 蒼, Kiryū Aoi) – the older Kiryū sister at 17 years old. She has long brunette hair and wears a school uniform. Voiced by Mao Enokizu.
- Yūko Kiryū (桐生 夕子, Kiryū Yūko) – the widowed mother of the two sisters. Yūko is a 42-year-old woman with short brown hair who wears a green top and a beige skirt. Voiced by Akari Tomiyama (credited as "Kaori").

== Development and release ==
RapeLay was developed by the Japanese company Illusion and released on April 21, 2006, in Japan.

The game's title is a combination of the words "rape" and "play". It features polygon-based 3D graphics, which were uncommon among adult computer games in Japan, while utilizing visuals based on Japanese manga and animation.

== Reception ==
HonestGamers' Zigfried described RapeLay as "a disturbing rape simulator". They heavily criticized the game's concept and the tedious gameplay. The reviewer complimented the character designs, animations and varied interactivity, while clarifying that these upsides do not erase the problematic subject matter.

== Controversy ==
RapeLay came to British Member of Parliament Keith Vaz's attention in 2009, three years after its initial release, as it was sold on Amazon.com, despite not being officially distributed or supported outside of Japan, and he vowed to bring the issue into the British Parliament to prevent the game from being sold. Amazon subsequently removed the game from sale on its website. Equality Now urged activists to write to Illusion and then-Japanese Prime Minister Taro Aso in protest, arguing the game breaches Japan's obligations under the Convention on the Elimination of All Forms of Discrimination Against Women.

On May 29, 2009, these actions culminated in the Liberal Democratic Party of Japan assembling a team to take measures intended to restrict the game's distribution. Japan's Ethics Organization of Computer Software (EOCS), a self-regulated industry body, decided to ask distribution companies to stop selling the game, making it almost impossible to buy it in Japan, as well as to consider banning the production and sale of games portraying sexual assault in general. The ban on "rape games" was announced by June 5, and although it was not legally binding, EOCS expected it to discourage the sale of such materials.

U.S. Supreme Court Justice Samuel Alito, in his concurring opinion in the case Brown v. Entertainment Merchants Association, mentioned RapeLay as an example and wrote, "It also appears that there is no antisocial theme too base for some in the video-game industry to exploit."

Mike Thomsen, writing for IGN, noted that while rape and killing are both heinous acts, the latter is "so much more acceptable as a gameplay mechanic" than the former. Illusion's response to the controversy was one of bewilderment and a reiteration that the game complied with Japanese law and was not sold outside Japan. Illusion later removed references to the game from its website and ceased distribution of the game, citing concerns over the impact on the industry.

Bans and restrictions by country
Date	Country	Details	References
By November 10, 2009	Australia	Distribution banned following a campaign by Women's Forum Australia, under the directorship of Melinda Tankard Reist.	
April 18, 2010	Argentina	The Ministry of Justice announced that sale and distribution of the game were illegal.	
June 1, 2010	New Zealand	Classified as "Objectionable" by the Office of Film and Literature Classification. The decision was entered in the register on this date.	

== See also ==
- List of controversial video games
- Video game controversies
