= Night Life (video game) =

Erotic graphic adventure game

- Developer(s): Kōei
- Publisher(s): Kōei
- Platform(s): NEC PC-8801; FM-7
- Release: JP: 1982
- Genre(s): Eroge
- Mode(s): Single-player

Night Life (ナイトライフ, Naitoraifu) is an erotic simulation game by Kōei, released for the PC-8801 computer in April 1982.

It was one of the earliest commercial Japanese erotic computer games, featuring sexually explicit images, and a precursor to the modern eroge genre. Night Life was marketed as an aid for the sex life of couples. It included such features as a schedule to determine a woman's period, and a catalog of possible sexual positions, with artwork consisting of black-and-white outlines.

The PC-8801 version got an English translation patch on May 19, 2022.
