= Hardcoded (video game) =

2018 video game

- Developer: Ghosthug Games
- Publisher: Ghosthug Games
- Designers: Kenzie Wintermelon; Trix
- Engine: Godot
- Platforms: Windows, macOS, Linux
- Release: 2024
- Genres: Erotic, visual novel
- Mode: Single-player

Hardcoded is an erotic dating simulator visual novel game developed and published by Ghosthug Games for Windows, macOS, and Linux. The game follows a droid named HC who runs away from her owners and joins the local trans community.

Lead developer Kenzie Wintermelon was initially motivated to create Hardcoded to target cisgender people with futanari fetishes, and to show them that becoming trans was an option for them. She and her codeveloper Trix wanted to create a game that showed positive aspects of the transgender community. Development on Hardcoded is ongoing and supported by Patreon donations.

Hardcoded has been generally well-received, with critics remarking on its positive portrayal of the transgender community and its polished writing.

== Gameplay ==
The dialogue, characters, and positive portrayal of trans women have been praised by critics.

In Hardcoded, the player controls a droid, who goes by "Hard Coded" or HC for short, because her factory-made male deadname is "hardcoded" into her and she is not able to change it. HC ran away from her owners and joins the local trans community in Pira City at the beginning of the game.

The game uses point and click adventure controls, where the player clicks on objects and characters in the game to interact with them. HC is able to build relationships with characters in the game, and it follows dating simulator progression paths. The game includes numerous explicit sexual encounters with other characters throughout its progression. The player may earn coupons, a form of currency, through various tasks. Coupons may be used to buy clothing and furniture.

=== Characters ===
Hardcoded has seven main characters with whom the player may have an intimate relationship: Beryl, Magdalena, Cadence, Decima, Heather, Joi, and Olivia. HC first meets Beryl when she helps HC escape from the police. Beryl is a shy volunteer librarian, and she has a strong maternal instinct. Magdalina is Beryl's girlfriend, and is initially suspicious of HC. Cadence is a goth witch who is close to Decima, and Decima is a droid mechanic with a robotic prosthetic right arm. Heather is HC's next door neighbor, and is an avid cosplayer and anime fan. Joi is a sex droid like HC, but is capable of more limited emotion and thought due to programming limitations. Olivia is a hacker. The player unlocks further characters throughout the game.

The player may have intimate relationships with several characters in a single playthrough, with no consequence for doing so. In addition to one-on-one encounters, the player may also have threesomes with certain characters.

== Development ==
Wintermelon draws artwork by hand, and converts it into pixel form afterwards for the game.

Hardcoded was conceived by American designer Kenzie Wintermelon, who has co-developed it with Trix. Wintermelon and Trix initially wanted to develop a video game since when they met in high school. They began development for the game in 2017. Wintermelon conceived of the game as a way to make money from cisgender people with a futanari or trans fetish, and hoped that it would make transitioning seem like a "real possibility" to them. The game intentionally avoids fetishizing the trans community with slurs, transphobia and other derogatory language and treatment, and Wintermelon wrote Hardcoded to reflect the trans community positively. Wintermelon was cautious of using the acceptance of a trans girl by her community as an emotional payoff, and had the main character be a droid to create an emotional buffer that would feel somewhat similar to the alienation that trans people felt while keeping the overall atmosphere more positive. Wintermelon was initially cautious about what content she added to the game, but has expanded to adding a wider range with support from backers. Her motivations for creating the game has changed with its success, as she passed making over $6,000 per month from the Patreon which supports Hardcoded's development.

Hardcoded was created using the Godot game engine. The pixel art of the game is created by Wintermelon. She draws artwork by hand and converts it into pixel form. The cyberpunk setting was inspired by Shadowrun, and Wintermelon decided on a cyberpunk theme for the game because "it felt right for some reason." The developers try to split up work between them evenly. Trix works on background animations and a few character stories, while Wintermelon focuses on the lewd scenes, animation, and programming. Wintermelon talked about her experience developing the game at a PAX East 2020 panel.

== Reception ==
Hardcoded has been generally well received, with reviewers from the trans community especially praising the game's inclusive writing. Rock, Paper, Shotgun's Astrid Johnson found the game to be "liberating in its portrayal of trans sexuality" and praised its writing. Wired's Mark Hill noted that some of the game's scenes veered into "over-the-top sci-fi territory", but said that the game worked overall because "it's sincere." PC Gamer's Jody Macgregor put Hardcoded on a list of best sex games, noting that it has terrific writing. Daily Dot's Ana Valens praised Hardcoded for embracing “sapphic desire between trans women without shame." Kotaku's Kate Gray echoed this sentiment, feeling that Hardcoded was a sex-positive experience for the trans community.
