= Sexual content in video games =

Video game theme

Video games have featured sexual content since the early days of the industry, and games of this nature can be found on most platforms and can be of any video game genre.

The inclusion of sex in games has been subject to varying levels of controversy over the decades, sometimes resulting in calls for increased regulation and legislation dealing directly with adult content.

In Western gaming, the promise of sexual content in games is commonly used as a marketing tool, but many highly sexualized games do not feature any explicitly adult content. Though some games do use sex acts or nudity as a narrative device, in-game reward, or a gameplay element, purely pornographic games are uncommon.

However, the Japanese pornographic eroge subgenre is popular worldwide. First appearing in the 1980s, these games vary significantly in narrative complexity as well as the level of interactivity, taking forms ranging from the visual novel to virtual reality experiences.

== History ==
=== 1980s ===
One of the earliest video games to feature sexual themes was the 1981 text-based Softporn Adventure, published by On-Line Systems for the Apple II. Despite heavy piracy, the game still sold 25,000 copies, roughly equivalent to 25% of the number of Apple II computers sold at the time. In a 1981 article in Time, On-Line reported that they were making a version of the game for straight women, though this never materialized.

Several pornographic games, such as X-Man, were created for the Atari 2600 in the early 1980s. The video game company, American Multiple Industries, released three unlicensed games for the Atari 2600; Beat 'Em & Eat 'Em, Custer's Revenge, and Bachelor Party. The games were poorly received (particularly Custer's Revenge, which is considered to be one of the worst games ever made), and AMI went out of business in 1983. Company PlayAround purchased the rights to these games and began distributing them under new titles in 2-in-1 cartridges.

In 1983, Entertainment Enterprises, Ltd. released an arcade game called Swinging Singles, which was mostly meant for bars, adult stores, and sex clubs. The game requires the player to drive through the city maze, gathering dots like Pac-Man before reaching a brothel where the player is required to fight off venereal disease and collect keys to unlock sex scenes.

Also released in 1983 was Strip Poker: A Sizzling Game of Chance for the Commodore 64 and other 8-bit platforms, which Artworx Software created.

In 1986, Martech released a strip poker game featuring digitized pictures of Samantha Fox on the C64, ZX Spectrum, and Amstrad. The same company would later release the controversial Vixen, featuring another page 3 model Corinne Russell.

Also, in 1986 On-line Systems (now called Sierra On-Line) asked game designer Al Lowe to create an adult game in the graphical adventure style made popular by their King's Quest series. Lowe took the basic elements of Softporn Adventure, greatly expanded it, and released it as the 1987 game Leisure Suit Larry in the Land of the Lounge Lizards. Sierra did not advertise the game, and retailers were loath to carry it, so initial sales were low. However, word-of-mouth spread, and soon the Leisure Suit Larry series was a success, spawning two sequels before the end of the decade, 1988's Leisure Suit Larry Goes Looking for Love (in Several Wrong Places), and 1989's Leisure Suit Larry III: Passionate Patti in Pursuit of the Pulsating Pectorals.

=== 1990s ===
With CD-ROM and multimedia-based games in the 1990s, most adult games featured video clips with limited interactivity. Both pre-rendered and real-time 3D graphics were also used. While most games could be considered nothing more than pornography, some attempted to include actual stories and plots. This can be seen in some games with less explicit content, equal to an R-rated or PG-13-rated movie.

1990 saw the release of the first game in the Gals Panic series. The game derived gameplay elements from an older title called Qix, which did not have sexual images. The object of the games is to slowly remove pieces of the playing field while avoiding an enemy or groups of enemies. Removing the playing field slowly reveals pictures of models in escalating states of undress. The game had nine sequels throughout the 1990s (with a final game in 2002).

Voyeur by Philips came out in 1993 for their CD-i console. While the game does not show any explicit nudity, it allows the player to spy on several characters in lingerie, and foreplay and explores taboos such as BDSM and incest.

In the 1990s, NEC (on the PC Engine series and PC-FX) and Sega (on Sega Saturn) were the only companies who officially allowed sexual content on their consoles in Japan, but eroge was more prevalent on the NEC PC-98 and FM Towns computer platforms.

=== 2000s ===
Modern console publishers often have policies against depictions of nudity and explicit sexuality, particularly Sony Computer Entertainment with its PlayStation brand of consoles. BMX XXX for the PlayStation 2 was censored in the American release, while versions on the Xbox and GameCube were not and featured nudity. However, Sony allowed nudity in the title God of War (2005), and also developed by Sony, a game based on Greek mythology set in Ancient Greece, where nudity was perceived differently. Nudity was subsequently featured in the game's sequels, God of War II (2007), God of War: Chains of Olympus (2008), God of War III (2010), God of War: Ghost of Sparta (2010), and God of War: Ascension (2013), which were also based on Greek mythology. The full-motion video quiz game The Guy Game (2004) gained notoriety for its use of an underage model. The scenes in question led to a lawsuit by a woman who explained that she was only seventeen years old when the footage was taken, thus classifying it as child pornography, which is illegal to own or sell in some countries.

Sex scenes and nudity have also appeared in Quantic Dream's Fahrenheit and Heavy Rain, released for the PlayStation 2 and PlayStation 3 respectively.

Sexuality and sexual frustration is also a theme prevalent in the Silent Hill series of survival-horror games.

A new generation of adult social games has emerged that bring multiple users together in sexual environments. Examples include Red Light Center, Singles: Flirt Up Your Life and Playboy: The Mansion. While it is not explicitly intended for purely adult-oriented entertainment, the virtual world of Second Life, which is made up almost entirely of player-made content, has an array of very exotic adult entertainment including nudity and full-on sexual activities.

Adult games may take the form of bootlegs, circumventing mainstream publishers who may have policies against such games. Patches or hacks to mainstream non-adult games may add sexual and pornographic themes, mostly for humor, especially when sexuality was never intended in the original game. Examples include the Tomb Raider video games, the Grand Theft Auto: San Andreas Hot Coffee mod, The Elder Scrolls IV: Oblivion, The Elder Scrolls V: Skyrim, and the Half-Life 2 FakeFactory Cinematic mod and ROM hacks for console emulators.

The Internet has allowed adult games to receive wider availability and recognition, including amateur games in Adobe Flash or Java. It has also allowed amateurs to create and distribute adult text adventure games, known as "Adult Interactive Fiction" or AIF.

Modern consumer virtual reality headsets, such as the Oculus Rift and HTC Vive, allow users to engage in virtual sex through simulated environments. An example is VR Kanojo.

=== 2010s ===
Blizzard Entertainment's 2016 game Overwatch has inspired a notable amount of fan-made porn. Short porn videos featuring official characters have been animated via Source Filmmaker and are popular on porn sites such as Pornhub. Despite its popularity, Blizzard has issued cease-and-desist orders to some of the creators.

The Witcher 3 is a prominent mainstream game featuring several sex scenes and nudity from both romantic encounters and visits to brothels, some of which are important to the plot.

Indie games have expanded the reach of adult games, and Steam now allows adult games onto its storefront. Patreon provides direct funding to adult developers, allowing games like Summertime Saga and Hardcoded to appeal to niche markets that previously would not have been created.

The continuing rise of open-source software development practices has also influenced adult video games, allowing communities of amateurs to collaboratively create and distribute adult games via the Internet.

=== 2020s ===
Sexual encounters are prominent features of RPG Baldur's Gate 3, which is potentially the first mainstream game that employed an intimacy coordinator when producing sex scenes with live actors during voice overs and motion capture.

The director for Cyberpunk 2077 commented on the importance of sex to the story of the Cyberpunk 2077 world, stating it is a world where everything is commodified and it would be incongruent if sex was not commodified.

Eek Games' House Party has scenes of nudity and sexual encounters. The game officially released on digital distribution platforms for Microsoft Windows leaving early access on July 15, 2022.

Rockstar Games' very popular 2026 releaseGrand Theft Auto VI features a lot of sexual content and nudity, as it aims to depict a realistic image of Maimi, Florida. It includes strip clubs, nudist communities, and sex scenes between the protagonists Jason and Lucia.

== Eroge ==
Eroge is a Japanese style adult erotic game. In 1982, Japan's Koei, founded by husband-and-wife team Yoichi and Keiko Erikawa (and later known for strategy video games), released the first erotic computer game with sexually explicit graphics, Night Life, an early graphic adventure game for the NEC PC-8801. That same year, Koei released another erotic title, Danchi Tsuma no Yuwaku (Seduction of the Condominium Wife), which was an early role-playing adventure game with colour graphics, owing to the eight-color palette of the NEC PC-8001 computer. It became a hit, helping Koei become a major software company.

In another opinion, Yuji Horii recalled in 1986 that he saw a demonstration of a Yakyūken-like game running on the FM-8 in the end of 1981, and he considered Yakyūken was the origin of adult games. Some writers say that Yakyūken (1981) produced for Sharp MZ computers by Hudson Soft is the first Japanese adult game.

Like with Koei, several other now-famous Japanese companies such as Enix, Square and Nihon Falcom also released erotic adult games for the PC-8801 computer in the early 1980s before they became mainstream. Early eroge usually had simplistic stories and extreme sexual content, such as rape and lolicon. In some of the early erotic games, the erotic content is meaningfully integrated into a thoughtful and mature storyline, though others often used it as simply an excuse for pornography.

In 1999, Key released Kanon. It contains about 7 brief erotic scenes in a sentimental story the size of a long novel (an all-ages version was also released afterward). Kanon sold over 300,000 copies.

In response to increasing pressure from Japanese lobby groups, in mid-1996 Sega of Japan announced that they would no longer permit Sega Saturn games to include nudity.

Many fanservice video games with sexual content have some brief nudity. The "M" rated series Senran Kagura has some nudity in both gameplay and cutscenes but genitals are not displayed. Fanservice games rated "T" such as the Hyperdimension Neptunia series offer similar content but less than what Senran Kagura has. However, since 2018, Sony has now issued new regulations for PlayStation 4 games with both fanservice and sexual content. For the localized release of Senran Kagura Burst Re:Newal, "Intimacy Mode", a mode where the player can play with the characters' bodies was removed, but by comparison, this mode is still available in the series' previous titles Senran Kagura: Estival Versus and Senran Kagura: Peach Beach Splash. The PC release of Burst Re:Newal was not changed. Many other recent PS4 games with sexual content are facing the same problem from Sony, including Neptunia, Date a Live: Rio Reincarnation, Death end re;Quest and the Nekopara series, although Sony did allow nudity and a sex scene in The Last of Us Part II. This controversy had become a problem for the development of Senran Kagura 7even, in which publishers Marvelous are now reconsidering the game and series producer Kenichiro Takaki is now leaving Marvelous.

== Lists of related games ==
- List of erotic video games
- List of regionally censored video games
- List of Japanese erotic video games
- List of AO-rated video games (the ESRB's "Adults Only" rating)
- List of controversial video games
- List of banned video games

== See also ==
- BDSM in culture and media
- Breast physics
- Criticism of Second Life
- Cybersex
- Eroge
- Gender representation in video games
- Hentai
- Overwatch and pornography
- The dictionary definition of playersexual at Wiktionary
- Sexism in video gaming
- Uncanny valley
- Virtual sex
