= Honey Select =

2016 eroge video game

- Developer: Illusion
- Series: Honey Select
- Engine: Unity 5
- Platform: PC
- Release: JP: September 9, 2016
- Genre: Eroge Dating Sim

Honey Select (ハニーセレクト) is an eroge dating sim video game, made by Illusion in 2016.

== Gameplay ==
=== Honey Select ===
Honey Select allows the player to invite up to two women to a variety of locations to have sex. The player chooses from a list of sexual acts. During the sex scenes, players can choose freely change the camera angle, choose how much clothing either character is wearing and change the lighting.

The most notable aspect of the game is the character creator, often touted as "the ultimate character creator." While the game has a variety of pre-made characters, players can create or modify female characters in great detail, though the options for male characters are limited.

While Honey Select was created for virtual reality, it's fully playable without a virtual reality headset.

=== Battle Arena ===
Battle Arena is a tactical roleplaying game released as downloadable content that uses characters created in Honey Select as the units. Like other tactical roleplaying game, units differ depending on class and strength.

=== Honey Studio ===
Honey Studio is a posing and animation program that comes bundled with Honey Select. Users may utilize any of the characters they've created as models and place them in any of the maps present in the game.

== Reception ==
In the view of Destructoid's reviewer, the game achieved its goal of becoming "the most polished VR room-scale sex simulator on the market". But he noted that playing the game was not a particularly erotic experience, given its exceptionally complicated controls. Gita Jackson of Kotaku commented on the disparate attention given to certain body parts – twelve parameters for breasts, two for butts, and none at all for penises. In fact, she noted, the game relegated male models to mere "floating dicks", and suggested many more creative options that were in fact available: all it was good for, she wrote, was to create a "vaguely attractive woman with nice breasts, with which you will have glossy, structured, porn-like sex with" [sic].
