= Battle Raper =

Battle Raper: Hyper Realaction
- Cover art featuring Mai Kisaragi
- Developer: Illusion
- Publisher: Illusion
- Platform: Windows
- Release: WW: April 19, 2002
- Genres: Eroge, fighting game
- Modes: Single-player, multiplayer

Battle Raper (バトルレイパー) is a eroge fighting game developed and published by Illusion Soft in 2002. The game has gained notoriety and controversy for its simulation of rape. This aspect was removed in its 2005 follow-up, Battle Raper II: The Game. While it still includes some sexual elements such as the removal of clothing, the sequel focuses more heavily on the fighting mechanics.

== Gameplay ==
Battle Raper is a hand-to-hand combat 3D fighting game. The gameplay system features power-ups that can be picked up in the arena. The female characters can lose their clothes as they take damage and special moves include sexually explicit grapple attacks. Besides the single- and multiplayer modes, including Story mode, Battle Raper features the Extra mode for the additional unlockable content. It allows the player to see unlockable artwork and animations, as well as featuring an option to allow to freely molest any of the four female fighters (Mai Kisaragi, Suzume Hachisuka, Fa Taolee, Chihaya Kagami: the only male fighter is Zenon).

== Reception ==
The game has gained notoriety because of its forced sex elements and was credited to be one of the Japanese adult games that not only resulted in "a widely publicised outcry in the West which only started years after the fact" but also led to the establishment of the Ethics Organization of Computer Software in 2009. Battle Raper was included on the GamesRadar's lists of the seven "most evil" video games in 2007: "At first, seeing female brawlers beat each other's clothes off is pretty amusing in a twisted way, but the streaming tears that come when the raping begins quickly kills any quirky humor or titillation to be had with this sick hentai title." and the 12 weirdest fighting games in 2008 ("Humiliation, rape and degradation are wrapped up in one package of shame, that's not only a shitty fighting game, but a sick idea as well"). The Washington Post included it among the 15 most morally controversial video games. The game was banned on the streaming video service Twitch.

== Battle Raper II ==
Battle Raper II: The Game
- Cover art featuring Setsuna Yagami
- Developer: Illusion
- Publisher: Illusion
- Platform: Microsoft Windows
- Release: April 22, 2005
- Genres: Eroge and versus fighting game
- Mode: Single-player / 2 players

=== Gameplay ===
Battle Raper II is a weapon-based 3D fighting game in which the players are able to knock female opponents' clothing off. Every character has unlimited guard, a move that cannot be blocked, as well as a super move. The game also features a variety of alternative clothing items and weapons for all the characters that can be used to edit their models.

The game includes a single-player story mode, a multiplayer mode, and an Extras mode which is unlocked after finishing the storyline. As opposed to the first Battle Raper, the sequel actually does not feature rape but only consensual sex. Once a fight against a female character is won, the game enters a special mode where the unconscious woman lies on the ground in front of the player who now has to heal her wounds. The Replay mode allows the player to have sex with a chosen female character.

=== Plot ===
The game's plot has no relations to the original Battle Raper and is set in the year "20XX". The Story mode follows a young treasure hunter swordsman named Yuuki. The player gets to choose one of the female characters to accompany Yuuki, while he travels the island, fighting undead monsters and other female characters (their competitors) and to lie with her in the end.

=== Fighters ===
- Yuuki Kukami (九鬼 悠樹): Yuuki is the game's main character and the only male character. He is armed with a sword and a gauntlet called the Soul Eater. He is followed by a bat-winged fairy named Eliza (ポカ), who shapeshifts into the sword, and is 5'9" tall.
- Setsuna Yagami (八神 刹那): Setsuna is a purple-haired female ninja of the Osei clan. She is armed with the Sun and Moon daggers and uses the elements of Light and Darkness. In the Story mode, from the conversations, it is clear that Yuuki knows Setsuna and that she has not forgotten him. She is 5'4" tall and her measurements are 92/58/87. As a popular character, Setsuna was also featured in Sexy Beach Zero.
- Yura Kamishiro (神代 由羅): Yura is a girl with orange hair in the Arcana clan which finds artifacts. She uses two Eagle Claws and holds an artifact which allows her to use the element of fire. Yura is more rambunctious and outgoing than her bespectacled older sister Sara. She is 5'3" tall and her measurements are 86/58/82.
- Sara Kamishiro (神代 紗羅): Sara is Yura's older sister. She is a member of the Arcana clan who specializes in computers. She is armed with a Dread Scythe and her element is vorpal. Sara is sent in with Yura to search for the Divine Element. She is 4'7" tall and her measurements are 80/52/77.
- Yayoi Mibu (御武 弥生): Yayoi is a dark-haired young woman who is a member of the Eisen Kreuz guild. She is armed with a Holy Dragon Blade and her element is wind. She is very hot-tempered, prone to letting her sword do the talking. Despite her personality, she is fond of cute things like Eliza. She is 5'3" tall and her measurements are 86/58/82.
- Elferris Kyougoku (エルフェリス 京極): Elferris is a blond girl who is armed with a weapon called 'Zubra' which is similar to a rapier, and her element is thunder. Like Yayoi, she is also a member of the Eisen Kreuz guild and is her superior. Elferris, in contrast to Yayoi, is regal and dignified, and would resort to using her sword only as a last resort. She is 5'4" tall and her measurements are 88/58/64.

=== Release ===
Battle Raper II was released only in Japan on April 22, 2005. Two add-ons were later released for the game:

- Sexy Raper allows the player to take pictures of all the female characters in poses with different outfits and backgrounds.
- CapRaper adds three additional characters from previous Illusion titles. The characters are Mayu Huzikawa (from Biko 3), Bael Altarus and Esk Andersson (from Des Blood 4): they cannot be used in the Story mode.

=== Reception ===
The game has gained some notoriety for its controversial content and for being associated with its infamous predecessor. Satirically reviewing the game in 2005, Something Awful's Zack Parsons tongue-in-cheek wrote: "I want to say that I am glad they took the rape out of Battle Raper 2, but sadly, I just can't. If you're going to make a game with rape in the title there needs to be rape in it." In 2010, Machinima.com's Steve and Larson ranked it as the fourth most offensive game ever.
