= Melinda Tankard Reist =

Australian political activist (born 1963)

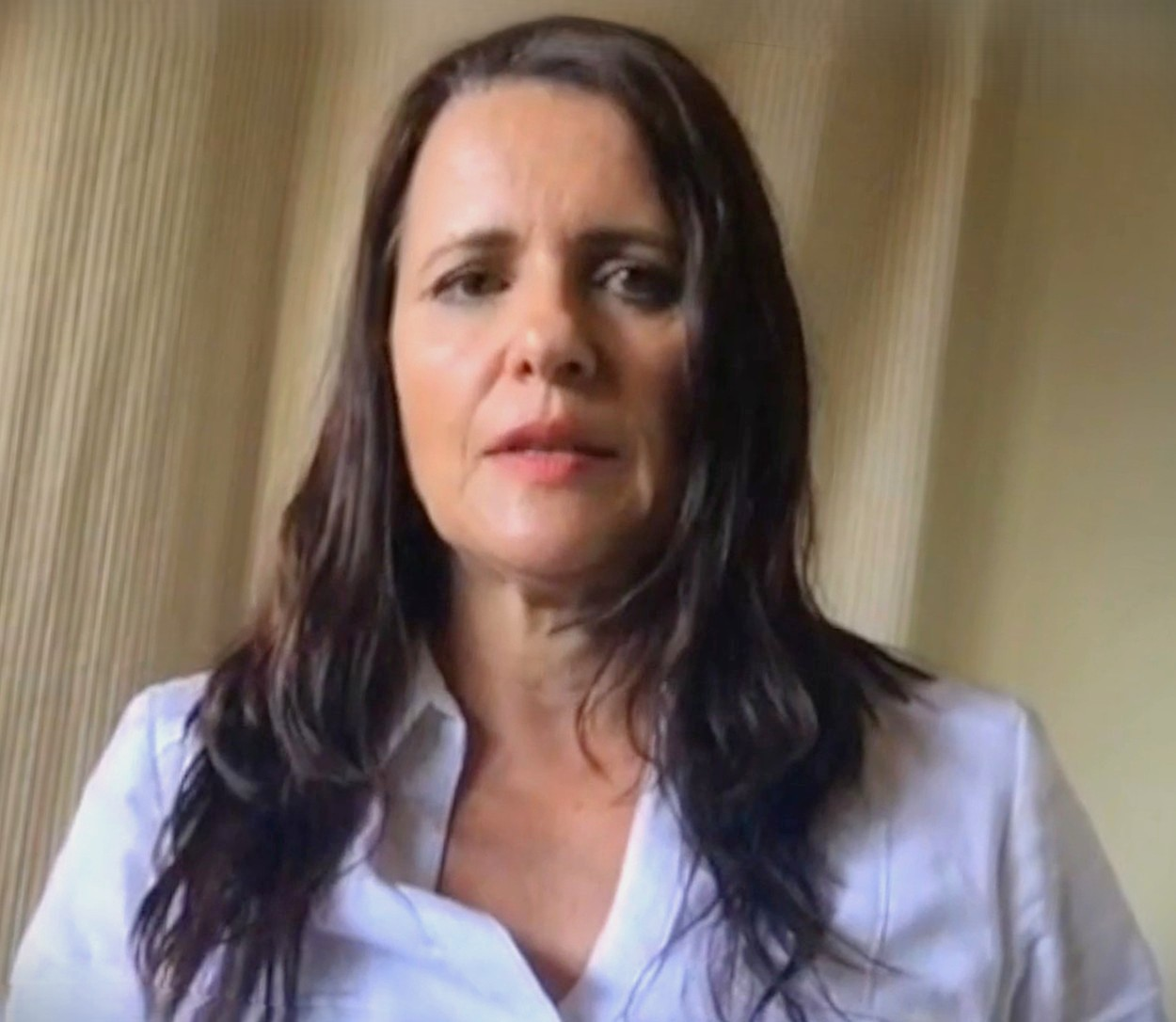
- Tankard Reist in 2016
- Born: Melinda Tankard; 23 September 1963 (age 63); Mildura, Victoria, Australia
- Occupations: Commentator; author; blogger
- Writing career
- Genre: Non-fiction
- Subjects: Anti-pornography; anti-abortion; feminism; violence against women

Melinda Tankard Reist (born 23 September 1963) is an Australian political activist, writer, speaker and media commentator principally known for her anti-pornography campaigns. She describes herself as "an advocate for women and girls" and a "pro-life feminist". Her campaigns to ban X-rated films have gained national attention in Australia. She is the founder of Women's Forum Australia and Collective Shout.

== Early life ==
Tankard Reist was born in Mildura, Victoria. She completed her secondary education at Mildura High School and then studied journalism at the Royal Melbourne Institute of Technology. She took up a cadetship at the Sunraysia Daily, where she worked from 1983 to 1987. As a recipient of a Rotary Foundation scholarship, she furthered her studies in journalism at the California State University, Long Beach, during 1987 and 1988.

== Career ==
On her return to Australia, Tankard Reist worked as a freelance contributor to newspapers and ABC Radio. From 1991 to 1993, she lived in Southeast Asia, where she was involved in voluntary aid work, including caring for infants with disabilities who had been relinquished for adoption. On her return to Australia, she took up a position as a media and bioethics advisor to conservative Tasmanian Senator Brian Harradine from 1993 to 2005. During her time as an advisor, she successfully lobbied against mifepristone and opposed changes to legislation requiring pro-life pregnancy-counseling services to disclose their affiliations in their advertising.

In 2004, she founded the anti-abortion lobby Women's Forum Australia before stepping down in 2007 following the fall of the Howard government to focus on the "sexualisation of children". She then became known as an "anti-pornification campaigner".

In 2012, social commentator Jennifer Wilson criticized the interviewer of a newspaper piece for not inquiring into the faith and motivation for Tankard Reist's work, describing her as "deceptive and duplicitous" about her religious motivations. Tankard Reist threatened multiple lawsuits alleging defamation, ultimately leading to significant mainstream media coverage of the event.

In 2017, Tankard Reist wrote in ABC's Religion & Ethics column to criticize the adult erotica series Fifty Shades.

Tankard Reist is a contributing editor for five books published by Duffy & Snellgrove and Spinifex Press, including works co-authored with Abigail Bray and Caroline Norma. In response to criticism that her views were "pro-life" and thus she "can't be a feminist", her self-described radical feminist publishers at Spinifex Press defended her feminism as authentic in a 2012 Religion & Ethics column (via ABC).

=== Collective Shout ===
In 2008, Tankard Reist co-founded Collective Shout, which self-describes as "a grassroots movement against the objectification of women and sexualization of girls in media, advertising and popular culture." She is also the director of the organisation.

Collective Shout has run campaigns against the child sex abuse dolls, games with themes of sexual violence, and sexualized children's clothing and other sexualization of children. The group rose to prominence in 2025 after successfully persuading payment platforms to pressure the digital distribution platforms Steam and Itch.io to remove games with themes of rape, incest, and sexual abuse. Collective Shout has been described as an anti-porn lobbying group by The Guardian, Le Monde and other news outlets; as well as specialized gaming and LGBTQ+ news outlets.

== Views ==
Tankard Reist describes herself as "an advocate for women and girls" and a "pro-life feminist", although at other times she has demurred from her feminist identity, saying in response to a question during a 2012 interview with Rachel Hills, "Call me whatever the hell you want, I don't care". Her description as a feminist has drawn criticism from several feminist authors and academics.

== Writings ==
- Tankard Reist, Melinda, ed. (2000), Giving Sorrow Words: Women's Stories of Grief After Abortion, Duffy & Snellgrove, ISBN 978-1-875989-67-6
- Tankard Reist, Melinda, ed. (2006), Defiant Birth: Women Who Resist Medical Eugenics, Spinifex Press, ISBN 978-1-74219-048-8
- Tankard Reist, Melinda, ed. (2009), Getting Real: Challenging the Sexualisation of Girls, Spinifex Press, ISBN 978-1-876756-75-8
- Tankard Reist, Melinda; Bray, Abigail, eds. (2011), Big Porn Inc: Exposing the Harms of the Global Pornography Industry, Spinifex Press, ISBN 978-1-876756-89-5
- Norma, Caroline; Tankard Reist, Melinda, eds. (2016), Prostitution Narratives: Stories of Survival in the Sex Trade, Spinifex Press, ISBN 978-1-74219-986-3

== See also ==
- Feminist sex wars
- Hot Coffee (minigame)
- Jack Thompson (activist)
- Mary Whitehouse
