= Secret Writer's Society =

1998 video game

- Publisher: Panasonic Interactive Media
- Platforms: Microsoft Windows, Macintosh
- Release: 10 February 1998
- Genre: Educational

Secret Writer's Society is a 1998 educational video game published by Panasonic Interactive Media for Windows and Macintosh. Following release, the game received negative coverage after a bug in the software was discovered to recite profanities due to an memory management error in its text to speech system. Collective RTMark originally claimed the bug was an intentional act of sabotage by a rogue programmer, which was later disclosed to be a hoax.

== Gameplay ==
An example of the text to speech function, use of which featured a bug on Macintosh.

Secret Writer's Society assists players aged 7 to 9 with learning writing skills, assisting with instruction of punctuation, capitalization, sentence structure and proofreading, as well as learning how to plan, draft, revise, edit and present written work. Players learn these skills through writing exercises named 'missions' based around a secret agent theme, such as reassembling fragmented documents. Each section is introduced with an animation featuring a song. Text to speech functionality is used to read out words and provide feedback to players, including to identify where punctuation is needed in the reassembled text. When players complete the first six missions, they earn letters that spell out a password unlocking the 'underground vault'. There, they are provided ideas to write on their own using different topics for stories or writing styles. Players could upload completed written pieces to the game's online website.

== Development and release ==
The text to speech functionality of Secret Writer's Society was developed by the Panasonic Speech Technology Laboratory.

== Reception ==
SuperKids wrote that the software was effective in teaching writing skills, but its appeal required "patience and motivation", observing children did not have fun at times and found it could be time-consuming to complete the game. Technology & Learning found the game impressive and well-designed, praising its "light, playful tone", and feedback to players as "sophisticated and specific" due to its inclusion of text to speech technology. Parenting enjoyed the theme and consideried it created "appealing disguises" for writing activities under the "trapppings of secrecy and mystery", which lent an "air of intrigue" to the educational software.

=== Controversy ===
Following release, children's software reviewer SuperKids issued a warning to parents on its website not to purchase the program. The authors of the site stated they had discovered the software's text to speech function had a bug on the Macintosh version that caused profanities to be spoken instead of intended words. The issue was triggered where a Macintosh user typed a large amount of text and reactivated the text to speech function whilst it had already begun. Art collective RTMark falsely claimed to the media the bug was intentionally implemented in collaboration with an anonymous programmer under contract to Panasonic, stating it was an anti-corporate critique intended to "wake parents up to reality" as to the consequences of "handing responsibility to some machine". The collective stated they paid the programmer $1,000.

Panasonic denied that the profanity was the result of internal sabotage, and stated the text-to-speech software had been written internally. The publisher stated the bug was the result of an error with the software's wordfilter intended to prevent children from using the function to generate swear words, and that whilst they tested the filter, "evidently we didn't test it well enough". Panasonic issued a public apology on their website, stated that unshipped copies would be pulled from distribution, and provided methods for consumers to replace the game with a patched version free of charge.

Coverage on the Secret Writer's Society bug was revived in 2018 when Video Game History Foundation librarian Phil Salvador discussed the game on his website The Obscuritory. Salvador contacted RTMark cofounder Igor Vamos, who stated that the story of sabotage was false and undertaken to be "provocative'. Upon playing the game and receiving suggestions from other readers, Salvador speculated the game had not been tampered with, and the bug was the source of a memory management issue. Salvador stated that the game felt "shoddy", and its features "can't disguise the fact that [it] is a rote exercise in formal writing", considering the game was not inspiring for players.
