= Illusion (company) =

Japanese video game developer

- Product type: 3D Video games
- Current owner: I-One Co., Ltd.
- Introduced: April 1, 1993; 33 years ago
- Discontinued: August 18, 2023; 3 years ago
- Website: www.illusion.jp

Illusion (Japanese: イリュージョン, Hepburn: Iryūjon) was one of the adult video game brands of Japanese company I-One Co., Ltd. based in Yokohama. It is notable for developing eroge video games with 3D graphics. After launching as a new brand of Heart Electronics Industry in 1992, I-One Co., Ltd. was established in 1996. (Note: I-One Co., Ltd. was the surviving corporation that inherited Heart Electronics Industry's JAN code.) Interheart Co., Ltd. is an independent manufacturer from Heart Electronics Industry. The brand name is derived from the meaning of "visual entertainment".

== Business history ==
Initially, the company focused on creating general adult games. Things changed with the release of the first 3D graphics game, Confinement (監禁, Kankin) (Note: Dengeki Hime described the game as "The first polygon Bishōjo game" on Volume 2 in August 1997.), and Makai (魔界, Makai) featuring heavy 3D graphics characters and backgrounds on February 14. Following works after INTERACT PLAY VR released on August 24, 2001, the company shifted its main focus to producing real-time 3D graphics games, and later have become well-known for the products.

The products are also known for characters customization and operation following a great hit of a virtual reality game VR Kanojo (VRカノジョ, Buiāru Kanojo) released in February 2017. In July of the same year, a hackathon related to VR Kanojo was held, and the establishment of "ILLUSION VR" (later IVR), a brand that mainly handles VR content, was announced.

There were many sister brands such as Illusion Core, Illusion Pro, Vision, MOTION, Dreams, mixwill soft, TEATIME, and FULLTIME, but currently, only Illusion and IVR are active. TEATIME and FULLTIME are linked as sister brands on the top page of the official website.

Originally, in response to the controversy of RapeLay, the products were not allowed to be sold or used outside Japan, and official support was only given in Japanese and for use in Japan. However, with the release of Honey Select Unlimited in coordination with the online English erotic game storefront FAKKU, Illusion's policy has since changed. Before this policy change, they were often translated and released in English and other languages by fans.

Illusion announced its closure on July 14, 2023. On August 4, 2023, a new company Illgames (stylized in all caps) announced their new game Honey Come. Some players speculate about the relationship between Illusion and Illgames for the similarity of their products. All development and sales of Illusion ceased on August 18, 2023 and the company stated that there will be no successor company.

== List of video games ==
- Angel Army (April 1, 1993)
- Sex Warrior Mokkoriman (August 27, 1993)
- Tile Yugi (November 20, 1993)
- Ridgeline of Darkness (March 25, 1994)
- Mokkoriman RPG (June 24, 1994)
- Kito Island Women's Prison (November 2, 1994)
- Soft Skin Bishojo (March 1, 1995)
- Red Cobra (March 10, 1995)
- Confinement (May 18, 1995)
- Orgy Onnai Tsuri - Mokkoriman no Nani de Nushi Tsuri - ☆ (August 11, 1995)
- Aegean Drops (December 15, 1995 )
- Ura-Mansion Happen (May 24, 1996)
- Manguri (June 28, 1996)
- Drifting (September 13, 1996)
- Ikumoto ☆ (October 25, 1996)
- Makai (February 14, 1997
- Des Blood (December 26, 1997)
- Des Blood 2 (June 11, 1998)
- Bikō (May 14, 1999)
- DANCINGCATs
- BRUTISH MINE (September 2000)
- Bikō 2: Reversible Face (January 2001)
- Requiem Hurts (June 29, 2001)
  - Requiem Hurts: Chisame's Escape (Expansion, ??)
- Interact Play VR (August 21, 2001)
- Battle Raper (April 19, 2002)
- Des Blood 4: Lost Alone (September 13, 2002)
- Sexy Beach (December 2002)
- Des Blood VR (June 7, 2003)
- Sexy Beach 2 (July 11, 2003)
  - Chiku Chiku Beach (Expansion, December 9, 2003)
- Bikō 3 (January 30, 2004)
- A-GA (June 25, 2004)
- Jinkō Shōjo ("Artificial Girl", July 23, 2004)
- Jinkō Shōjo 2 ("Artificial Girl 2", November 26, 2004)
- Battle Raper II (April 22, 2005)
- Oppai Slider 2 (November 25, 2005)
- RapeLay (April 21, 2006)
- Sexy Beach 3 (September 29, 2006)
  - Sexy Beach 3 Plus (Expansion, December 15, 2006)
- SchoolMate (May 25, 2007)
- BotuPlay (Extra Disc, RapeLay, July 21, 2007)
- Jinkō Shōjo 3 ("Artificial Girl 3", November 30, 2007)
  - Jinkō Shōjo 3 Privilege Disc (Bonus Disc, ? 2008)
  - Jinkō Shōjo 3 Hannari (Expansion, June 2, 2008)
  - Jinkō Shōjo 3 Hannari Privilege Disc (Expansion Bonus Disc, ? 2008)
- Hako (Box, October 10, 2008)
- SchoolMate Sweets! (Standalone Fan Disc, February 27, 2009)
- @Home Mate (May 29, 2009)
- Yuusha kara wa Nigerarenai! ("You can't escape from the heroine!", October 2, 2009)
- Real Kanojo ("Real Girlfriend", February 19, 2010)
- SchoolMate 2 (June 25, 2010)
- Sexy Beach Zero (October 29, 2010)
- Jinkō Gakuen ("Artificial Academy", June 10, 2011)
- Wakeari! (November 11, 2011)
- Love Girl (February 24, 2012)
- Ore ga Shujinkou ("I'm the Hero", May 25, 2012)
- Happy End Trigger (October 12, 2012)
- Premium Play Darkness (January 25, 2013)
  - Premium Studio Pro (Disc Add-On Expansion, April 19, 2013)
- Musumakeup! (July 26, 2013)
- Immoral Ward (November 1, 2013)
- Real Play (March 7, 2014)
- Jinkō Gakuen 2 ("Artificial Academy 2", June 13, 2014)
  - Jinkō Gakuen 2: Append Set (Add-on, August 29, 2014)
  - Jinkō Gakuen 2: Append Set 2 (Add-on, October 31, 2014)
- HaremMate (December 26, 2014)
- Playclub (April 24, 2015)
  - Playclub Studio (Disc Add-on Expansion, July 10, 2015)
- Sexy Beach Premium Resort (September 11, 2015)
- Sekurosufia ("Secrosphere", April 28, 2016)
- Honey Select ("Honey Select", September 9, 2016)
  - Honey Select: Personality Addition Pack (Add-on, October 21, 2016)
  - Honey Select: Party (Add-on Expansion, April 28, 2017)
- VR Kanojo (February 27, 2017, first attempt selling game in native English.)
- PlayHome (October 13, 2017)
  - PlayHome Additional Data + Studio (Disc Add-on Expansion, January 26, 2018)
- Koikatsu (April 27, 2018)
  - Koikatsu: Personality Addition Pack (Add-on, August 31, 2018)
  - Koikatsu: After School (Add-on, December 21, 2018)
  - Koikatsu: After Darkness (Add-on, May 31, 2019)
- Koikatsu Party (June 10, 2019, English release of Koikatsu—character creation and studio only, all story and school mode content removed)
- Emotion Creators (Standalone Disc, April 26, 2019)
- AI Girl (Previously called Project-I) (October 25, 2019, Steam March 17, 2020)
- Honey Select 2 Libido (May 29, 2020)
  - Honey Select 2 Libido DX (Add-on, October 30, 2020)
- Koikatsu Sunshine (August 27, 2021)
- Room Girl (September 30, 2022)
