= 8:46 (video game) =

2015 virtual reality video game

- Developer: Anthony Krafft
- Engine: Unreal Engine 4
- Platform: Windows
- Release: September 1-12 2015
- Genre: Simulation
- Mode: Single-player

8:46 is a 2015 virtual reality simulation video game based on the September 11 attacks. The game takes place in the World Trade Center during the plane crash into the North Tower. The name comes from the exact time that American Airlines Flight 11 crashed into the North Tower.

== Gameplay ==
The player plays as an unnamed office employee working on the 101st floor of the North Tower of the World Trade Center during the September 11 terrorist attacks. They do their morning telemarketing work in a room with one other employee. During their work, the building shakes and multiple ceiling tiles fall. The door is jammed shut, and they and the other employee are trapped within the room.

A man kicks open the door and hands them a flashlight. They are warned about the slowly encroaching fire. After testing every door and finding that they are jammed, they are trapped in the darkness on this floor. Their co-workers make phone calls to their families saying their final goodbyes as smoke fills the room. The man breaks open a window to the outside. The player has to choose between dying from smoke inhalation or jumping out of a window and falling to their death.

== Development ==
In an interview with Tech Insider, the game's creative director Anthony Krafft said the game was a student project for the French school ENJMIN and was never intended to be released commercially. Approaching the event from a "genuine" and historic perspective, Krafft said the team used several references including an interview with a survivor, actual floor plans from the World Trade Center, and the nonfiction book 102 Minutes to re-create the experience of being in the tower during the attacks.

== Reception ==
When the game first released in 2015, many news publications gave it negative reviews, calling it "disrespectful", "horrifying", "distasteful" and "offensive". Those who played the game felt the game was completely unnecessary and didn't need to exist as many already knew about the attacks and empathized with the victims. Victims themselves also came forward speak out against the game, as they did not wish to be reminded of the attacks.

== See also ==
- Reactions to the September 11 attacks
