= Survival Island 3 =

2015 video game

- App icon
- Developer: NIL Entertainment
- Publisher: NIL Entertainment
- Platforms: iOS, Android
- Release: December 2015
- Genres: Survival, action
- Mode: Single-player

Survival Island 3: Australia Story was a 2015 survival-action game created by Kristina Fedenkova of NIL Entertainment, which drew significant controversy for its portrayal of Australian Aboriginals. The game was released for the App Store and Google Play in December 2015. The game is a 3D first-person survival-action game in which the player is able to ally with or fight against Indigenous Australian people as well as a variety of Australian fauna while trying to survive. The game's allowance of the fair-skinned player character to fight and kill Aboriginal tribesmen for in-game rewards has been criticised as racist.

== Reception ==
A Change.org petition was created by Georgia Mantle calling for the game to be removed from Google and Apple marketplaces. She wrote: "By shooting ‘dangerous Aboriginals’, this app makes us inhuman, it re-enforces racial violence, lack of punishment for white people taking black lives, it makes fun and sport of massacres and Frontier violence." The petition gathered over 20,000 signatures in less than 24 hours and as of 16 January 2016, it had received over 60,000 signatures. The petition was also seeking an apology from the game's developer.

== Response ==
On 16 January 2016, the game was removed from the Apple App Store, which was followed by its removal from Google Play later that day. Videos of gameplay captured and published to YouTube were also removed. On 17 January the petition was closed after receiving a total of 84,672 supporters and achieving two of its objectives. Australia's Federal communications minister Mitch Fifield asked his staff to "provide advice on the circumstances of its release". He said of the game: "I am appalled that anyone would develop such a so called 'game' and that any platform would carry it."
