= List of regionally censored video games =

Many video games have certain elements removed or edited due to regional rating standards.

== Third generation (1985–1993) ==
- Bionic Commando – The game was renamed from Top Secret: The Resurrection of Hitler (ヒットラーの復活 トップシークレット, Hittorā no Fukkatsu: Toppu Shīkuretto), the character of Adolf Hitler was renamed "Master-D", the Nazis are renamed "The Badds" in-game and referred to as "The Nazzs" in the instruction manual and all swastikas were edited into a German eagle insignia.
- Dragon Quest – Nintendo removed salacious humor and religious connotations from the English-language version. For example, in the original Japanese version, in the town where the hero first buys keys, a woman offers to sell puff-puff—a Japanese onomatopoeia for a girl rubbing her breasts in someone's face, or juggling her own breasts. In the North American version, the same woman sells tomatoes.
- Punch Out!! – The character Vodka Drunkenski has his name changed to Soda Popinski in its English release.

== Fourth generation (1988–1997) ==
- Final Fantasy IV – In the North American version, references to Christianity were altered or removed from the game, as well as certain religious images. The magic spell Holy has been renamed White. All references to prayer are eliminated; the Tower of Prayers in Mysidia is renamed the Tower of Wishes; and Rosa's Pray command is absent. Direct references to death are omitted, although several characters die over the course of the game. Anything considered too risqué has been censored, such as bikinis on town dancers (replaced by leotards). The Programmers' Room special feature (in which the player can find a pornographic magazine) has been removed. New promotional character art was made for published previews.
- Final Fight – The game's first two bosses, Damnd and Sodom, were renamed Thrasher and Katana respectively (those names were also used in the SNES version of Street Fighter Alpha 2 despite the game released after ESRB was formed); Belger's wheelchair was redrawn to look like an office chair; Poison and Roxy, two transgender enemy characters, were replaced with two male enemies named Billy and Sid; all alcoholic references were removed, with two health-recovering items replaced; the line "Oh! My God", spoken by an enemy when his car is destroyed during the first bonus stage, was changed to "Oh! My Car"; the blood splash effect shown when a character is stabbed is replaced by a generic explosion.
- Mortal Kombat – Due to Nintendo's "Family Friendly" policy, the SNES version replaced the blood with sweat and most of the fatalities with less violent "finishing moves".
- Super Mario Kart – There were victory animations for each winning character that involves the use of a bottle of champagne. In the Japanese version, Bowser and Princess Peach drink champagne in their animations (which made them drunk), and this was against Nintendo of America's censorship policy on the depiction of drinking alcoholic products. This was changed to Bowser posing himself happily and Princess Peach tossing it upwards the air and catching it. These changes were applied to the European version.
- Zombies Ate My Neighbors – All depictions of blood and gore in the North American version are removed or changed to purple ooze. Censorship committees in several European Nations censored more by having the game renamed to Zombies and made other changes including the replacement of the chainsaw-wielding enemies with lumberjacks wielding axes.
- SimAnt – For the SNES release in the US, animations of an ant vomiting were removed.

== Fifth generation (1993–2003) ==
- Crusin' USA – Many changes were made to the arcade game due to Nintendo's "Family Friendly" policy, including the name of the Shaft being renamed from "XL Power Shaft" to "XL Power" and the billboard ad for Corn Pops had the slogan "Gotta have my pops" removed. Deer and cows no longer cross the road, eliminating any possibility of running into them and their blood and body parts flying everywhere. The bikini clad woman with the trophy wears a shirt and dress. In the Washington DC tunnel the 100 dollar bill picture with Hillary Clinton smoking a cigar was replaced with a Benjamin Franklin 100 dollar bill. The hot tub scene at the White House with Bill Clinton and the two bikini clad women was replaced with a rotating race car.
- Breath of Fire IV – The scene with Fou-Lu decapitating Emperor Soniel in the Japanese version has been cut from the North American version.
- Crash Bandicoot 2: Cortex Strikes Back – A death animation in which Crash is squashed into a stunned head and feet was altered for the Japanese version of the game due to its resemblance to the Kobe child murders.
- Final Fantasy VIII – In the North American version, the boss Gerogero has been recolored from red in the Japanese to blue in the English version. This change also applies to the Triple Triad Gerogero card.
- DreamWeb – Full frontal nudity was censored in the Australian version.
- Carmageddon – In the United Kingdom, pedestrians were replaced with zombies with green blood, and in Germany they were replaced with robots that did not move.

== Sixth generation (1998–2008) ==
- BMX XXX – Only the GameCube and Xbox versions contained nudity. The North American version of the game on PS2 disables the ability to create naked customized riders.
- Grand Theft Auto III – Rampage challenges and the associated pick-ups were removed from the German release of the game due to German censors not wanting to allow people to live out killing spree fantasies. Also for the German release, when a civilian dies or is shot, there is no blood, and they do not drop money in an attempt to limit incentives to "kill for points".
- Indigo Prophecy – Sony and Microsoft had, and still have, policies that they would refuse to allow "Adults only" (AO) rated games on their respective consoles. To earn a M rating from the ESRB, most of the scenes depicting sex (one of which is interactive) and other adult content were removed from the North American versions. An exception is the final sex scene between Carla and Lucas, which was not completely cut from the game due to its important role in the story, but was shortened by removing the more graphic shots and most of the visible nudity. One shot of nudity remains in the edited version — from the angle that should have revealed Carla's fully naked breasts, the nipples were removed from her model skin, giving the impression that the nipples were merely obscured from view, thus avoiding any identifiable depictions of frontal female nudity.
- Command and Conquer Generals – Due to the game previously being banned in Germany, EA released a title-localized German version specifically for the German market called "Command & Conquer: Generäle", which did not incorporate real world factions or any relation to terrorism. For example, the "terrorist" suicide bomber unit was transformed into a rolling bomb and all other infantry units were changed into "cyborgs" in order of appearance and unit responses similar to earlier releases of the Command & Conquer franchise.
- Soldier of Fortune II: Double Helix – In Germany, humans were replaced by robots, and blood was replaced by oil.

== Seventh generation (2004–2013) ==
Some titles in the PlayStation 3 library have been censored according to the console hardware, resulting in consoles from certain regions directly altering game content, regardless of the region in which the game was produced.

- Beyond: Two Souls – The European version of the game is censored to keep the PEGI rating at 16 instead of 18. Two changes were made to the version, amounting to 5–10 seconds of gameplay.
- The Last of Us – The European release of the game is censored as it does not feature dismemberment and exploding heads in the multiplayer mode. The Japanese version is censored, as dismemberment is not possible. A scene where Ellie is imprisoned and witnesses a man cutting a corpse was also censored as the camera's position does not show the corpse.
- Little Big Planet – In the later copies of the game, the lyric song "Tapha Niang" was replaced with the instrumental version due to suspected quotes from the Qur'an being mixed with music.
- Mortal Kombat vs. DC Universe – In order to ensure a T rating in North America, two Fatalities in the game were censored. In the United Kingdom version, both the Joker and Deathstroke's first Fatality feature them each finishing their opponent with a gunshot to the head, with each respective shot shown uncut from a distance. However, the North American version has the camera quickly pan toward the victor before the shot is fired, thereby cutting the victim out of the shot completely.
- Resistance: Fall of Man – Blood is removed from the game when played on Japanese consoles.
- Uncharted: Drake's Fortune – Blood is removed from the game when played on a Japanese region PS3.
- Fallout 3 – The side-quest "The Power of the Atom" was changed in the Japanese version to relieve concerns about depictions of atomic detonation in inhabited areas. In other versions, players are given the option of either defusing, ignoring, or detonating the dormant atomic bomb in the town of Megaton. In the Japanese version, the character Mr. Burke has been taken out of this side quest, making it impossible to detonate the bomb. Also in the Japanese release, the "Fat Man" nuclear catapult weapon was renamed "Nuka Launcher", as the original name was a reference to Fat Man, the nuclear bomb used on Nagasaki.
- Silent Hill: Homecoming – The game had difficulties in passing censors in some countries before it could go on sale. The Australian Classification Board, then the Office of Film and Literature Classification (OFLC), refused to classify the game, due to "impact violence and excessive blood effects". The objectionable scenes included various body parts being drilled into and the bisection of a character by an enemy. This led to the game being banned from sale in the country. Representatives for publisher Atari mentioned that they would be asking Konami to tone down the violence to allow the game to receive the needed MA15+ rating for its sale to be permitted in early 2009. The German version of the game was also postponed to 2009 in order for cuts to be made to pass the German censors.
- Homefront - The Japanese version removed all references to North Korea and Kim Jong-il renaming them to "A Certain Country to the North" (北の某国) and the "Northern Leader" (北の指導者) respectively.
- South Park: The Stick of Truth – The European version had all five references to anal probing removed. An abortion minigame was also cut. Ubisoft claimed that it was their decision to censor it. In the German release, swastikas were covered with black boxes on zombies.
- Left 4 Dead 2 – In Australia, the game was originally banned due to the high levels of violence in the gameplay. Valve then submitted a 'censored' version of the game which no longer contained images of "decapitation, dismemberment, wound detail or piles of dead bodies". The game received the MA15+ rating (the highest possible rating at the time in Australia), and was allowed to be released in the Australian market. The German version is similarly censored.
- The Witcher – All the female portrait cards shown after Geralt's "sexual conquests" were censored ("retouched to a more modest standard") for the U.S. release version.
- Gal*Gun – Publishers Inti-Creates was forced by Microsoft to censor the Xbox 360 version due to players being able to look up the girls' skirts, while the PlayStation 3 version remained completely uncensored.
- Football Manager 2005 – China's Ministry of Culture stated that Tibet being listed as a separate country in the game would "pose harm to the country's sovereignty and territorial integrity" so the Chinese release saw Tibet merged into China.
- Wii Play: Motion - In the European releases of the game, the real ninjas in the Ninja Stage of Trigger Twist were replaced with robot ninjas to reduce violence, making the game more family friendly and more marketable.

== Eighth generation (2011–present) ==
- The Witcher 3: Wild Hunt – Violence and gore was reduced and nudity cut from the game's release in Japan and the Middle East.
- Until Dawn – A death scene was censored in the Japanese version of the game.
- Monster Monpiece – About 40 of the 350 card images in the game were censored for sexually explicit material in the international PlayStation Vita release of the game. An uncensored port was later announced to be released on Steam for PC in 2016.
- Fire Emblem Fates – A controversial scene showing what could be perceived as gay conversion therapy was edited in the international release of the game to remove references to the act. In addition, a feature that allowed players to "pet" a chosen character's face was removed.
- Omega Labyrinth Z – Release outside of Japan was blocked by Sony after the game was refused classification in Germany, Australia and the United Kingdom.
- Senran Kagura Burst Re:Newal - The game's "Intimacy Mode" had to be removed from the PS4 release of the game outside of Japan by request from Sony. The Steam release was not changed.
- Nekopara – The PS4 release was censored by Sony due to its sexual content. As a result, the PS4 version received an "E" rating by the ESRB in comparison to receiving an "M" rating on the Nintendo Switch.
- Date a Live: Rio Reincarnation – The PS4 release has two modified CGs. The game's PC release was not changed.
- Super Neptunia RPG – Two illustrations were altered in the PS4 release.
- Aokana: Four Rhythm Across the Blue - The PS4 release was limited to digital-only due to changes related to seven scenes within the game and "significantly less interest" than expected in a physical version. As a result, four scenes were modified and three were removed completely. The Nintendo Switch release received no changes to content or choice between physical and digital versions. The Nintendo Switch release launched on schedule, whereas the PS4 release has been delayed to an as of yet undetermined date.
- Assassin's Creed Valhalla – A bloody scene was censored in the Asian versions for PS4 and PS5.
- Crystar – The PS4 and Nintendo Switch versions had approximately 0.5 seconds of footage depicting Rei's naked buttocks removed from the pre-title-screen cinematic. The game's PC release was not changed.
- YU-NO: A Girl Who Chants Love at the Bound of this World – Western PS4 and Switch versions have a sunbeam placed over Sala's naked lower body and some cursor interaction symbols have been replaced with the "investigation" symbol. The PC version was not changed.
- Zanki Zero: Last Beginning – Western PS4 and PC versions removed or modified content that could be interpreted as sexualization of characters depicted as minors. PlayStation 4 packaging art, Sachika bedroom scene CGIs, Sachika CGI in the opening sequence and Child Rinko extend machine CGI were all modified. All "Child" bedtime event cutscenes were removed.
- Baldur's Gate 3 – The Japanese version removed a scene were the player has an option to torture characters in the goblin camp and the options to show genitalia or view sex scenes has been removed.
- Freakyforms Deluxe - The European and Japanese versions had a special action named "Pump", making your Formee jump by producing a big fart. The American version changed it to a more generic Super Jump due to Nintendo of America's strict censorship rules at the time.
- Dispatch - The Nintendo Switch version of the game was released in January 2026, with all scenes depicting nudity, sexual content and crude gestures being censored. Developer AdHoc Studio claimed that Nintendo content criteria resulted in the censorship of the game on the Switch platform. In response to claims of concealing censorship details in the marketing, AdHoc stated that they did not do so and promised an update to revert some of the censored material in response to the backlash. Six months later in June 2026, AdHoc released an additional free DLC titled "HR Violations" for the Switch version that removed some of the nudity, but genital nudity and sexual audio were left censored. This DLC was not made available for the Japanese Switch version.
