= List of erotic video games =

This is a list of erotic video games.

== Legend ==
3DO	3DO
Amiga	Amiga
Android	Android
Apple II	Apple II
IIGS	Apple IIGS
Arcade	Arcade video game
Atari 8-bit	Atari 8-bit computers
Atari 2600	Atari 2600
BBC	BBC Micro, Acorn Electron

Browser	Browser game
C16	Commodore 16, Plus/4
C64	Commodore 64
CD32	Amiga CD32
CD-i	CD-i
CDTV	Commodore CDTV
CPC	Amstrad CPC
DOS	MS-DOS
FM-7	FM-7

FM Towns	FM Towns
GameCube	GameCube
Java ME	Java Micro Edition
Linux	Linux
Mac	Mac
MSX	MSX
MSX2	MSX2
MZ-80K	Sharp MZ
NES	Nintendo Entertainment System

PC-88	PC-88
PC-98	PC-98
PC Engine CD	TurboGrafx-CD/PC Engine CD
PS2	PlayStation 2
PS3	PlayStation 3
PS4	PlayStation 4
PS5	PlayStation 5
PSV	PlayStation Vita
Saturn	Sega Saturn

Spectrum	ZX Spectrum
ST	Atari ST
Switch	Nintendo Switch
TRS-80	TRS-80
Wii	Wii
Win	Windows
X1	Sharp X1
X68K	X68000
Xbox	Xbox

== List of erotic games ==
Name	Year	Developer	Publisher	Platforms	Notes	Refs
7 dní a 7 nocí	1994	Pterodon	Vochozka Trading	DOS		
7 Sins	2005	Monte Cristo	Digital Jesters	PS2, Win		
177	1986	Macadamia Soft	Macadamia Soft	PC-88, X1		
The Adventures of Harry: The evidence Under the Underwear	2000	ExE-Soft	Discus Games	Win	Spinoff from the 1997 game GAG The Impotent Mystery.	
Airline 69: Return to Casablanca	2003	Redfire Software	Redfire Software	Win		
All Star Strip Poker: Girls at Work	2006	City Interactive	Digital Red Publishing	Win		
Bachelor Party	1982	American Multiple Industries	American Multiple Industries	Atari 2600	A reskinned version of the game titled Bachelorette Party was also released. When PlayAround gained the rights to American Multiple Industries's titles, they rereleased it with Gigolo.	
Bachelorette Party	1983	PlayAround	PlayAround	Atari 2600	The game is a reskinned version of the game Bachelor Party. It was released as a 2-in-1 cart with Burning Desire.	
Bangfit	2016	PornHub	PornHub	Browser		
Bare Truth	1995		Fat Dog Productions	Win		
Battle Raper	2002	Illusion	Illusion	Win		
Battle Raper 2: The Game	2005	Illusion	Illusion	Win	Sequel to the 2002 game Battle Raper.	
Bazooka Sue	1997	Starbyte Software	Starbyte Software	DOS		
BeacHouSeX	2021	Citor3 Entertainment Studio	ImagineVR Inc.	Win		
Beat 'Em & Eat 'Em	1982	American Multiple Industries	American Multiple Industries	Atari 2600	A reskinned version of the game titled Philly Flasher was later released by PlayAround, after acquiring the rights to American Multiple Industries's titles.	
Big Bang Empire	2014	3x Entertainment	3x Entertainment	Android, Browser, Win		
Biing!: Sex, Intrigue and Scalpels	1995	reLINE Software	Magic Bytes	Amiga, DOS		
Biko 3	2004	Illusion	Illusion	Win		
Bingo 75	1990	Sachen	Sachen	NES		
Black Souls I	2017	Eeny, meeny, miny, moe?	Eeny, meeny, miny, moe?	Win		
Black Souls II	2018	Eeny, meeny, miny, moe?	Eeny, meeny, miny, moe?	Win		
Bliss	2005	Games for Loving	Games for Loving	Android, Linux, Mac, Win		
Block Terminator	1988	Harmonics	DOTT Plan	MSX2	Published in the Netherlands by Homesoft.	
Blood and Lust	2019	Ertal Games	Ertal Games	Mac, Win		
Blood Pact	2019			Win		
Blue Angel 69	1989	micro-partner Software	Magic Bytes	Amiga, C64, ST, DOS		
Blush Blush	2019	Sad Panda Studios	Sad Panda Studios	Browser, Linux, Mac, Win		
BMX XXX	2002	Z-Axis	AKA Acclaim	Xbox, GameCube	Also released on the PlayStation 2, with nudity censored. Australian versions have all sexual content removed.	
Bomb'X	1993	Mediagogo	Mediagogo	Amiga, DOS, Mac, ST		
Bonecraft	2019	D-Dub Software	D-Dub Software	Win		
BoneTown	2009	D-Dub Software	D-Dub Software	Win		
Boobs Saga	2020	Boobs Dev	Boobs Dev	Win		
Brave Soul	2003	Crowd	Peach Princess	Win		
Breeders of the Nephelym	TBA	DerelictHelmsman	DerelictHelmsman	Win	In development, with Patreon supporters receiving access to the newest builds of the game, and the game's alpha is free on Steam in early access.	
Bride of the Robot	1989	Free Spirit Software	Free Spirit Software	Amiga, ST	Third game in the Brad Stallion series.	
Bubble Bath Babes	1991	C&E	C&E	NES		
Burning Desire	1983	PlayAround	PlayAround	Atari 2600	Released as a 2-in-1 cart with Bachelorette Party	
Cal II	1991	Birdy Soft	Birdy Soft	FM Towns, MSX2, PC-98, X68000		
California Sexy Exposed	2006	Hands-On Entertainment	Hands-On Entertainment	Java ME		
Can Can Bunny Spirits	1991	Cocktail Soft	Cocktail Soft	MSX2, PC-98, X68000		
can you say my name again	2017	Nadia Nova		Win		
Canvas Croquis	1985	SNK	SNK	Arcade		
Captain Hardcore	TBA	AntiZero		Win	In development, with Patreon supporters receiving access to features not present in the free version.	
Casino Girls	1994		VCSI	DOS		
Castl'X	1996	Mediagogo	Mediagogo	Amiga, DOS, Mac		
Castle Knatterfels: 3DD Strip Poker	2006	Redfire Software	Redfire Software	Win		
Casual Romance Club	2003	Libido	Libido	Win		
Cathouse Blues	1983	PlayAround	PlayAround	Atari 2600	A reskinned version of the game titled Gigolo was also released. It was bundled with Philly Flasher when PlayAround gained the rights to American Multiple Industries's titles.	
Caveman Zac	2004	Grasland Production	Redfire Software	Win		
The CD Brothel	1994	Microforum International	Softforum	Win		
Centerfold Squares	1988	Artworx	Artworx	Amiga, DOS, ST	Published by Proein S.A in Spain, and CDS Software in the rest of Europe. Retitled Centrefold Squares in Europe, except in Spain. An expansion disk adding an additional eleven opponents was released.	
Chain: The Lost Footprints	2002	ZyX	G-Collections	Win		
Chasing the Stars	2019	Ertal Games	Ertal Games	Win		
Cloud Meadow	TBA	Team Nimbus	TinyHat Studios	Win	In development, with the game being in early access on Steam.	
Cobra Club	2015	Robert Yang		Linux, Mac, Win		
Cobra Mission: Panic in Cobra City	1992	INOS	Hard	DOS, PC-98	English release published by Megatech Software.	
Come Play With Me	1995		Rimfire Pacific	Win		
Come See Me Tonight	2003	Sekilala	G-Collections	Win		
Come See Me Tonight 2	2004	Sekilala	G-Collections	Win		
Coming Out on Top	2014	Obscurasoft	Obscurasoft	Linux, Mac, Win		
Corruption of Champions II	TBA	Salamander Studios	Salamander Studios	Browser, Linux, Win	Sequel to Corruption of Champions. In development, with the game being in early access on Steam.	
Cosmic Psycho	1991	Cocktail Soft	Cocktail Soft	MSX2		
Cover Girl Strip Poker	1991	Emotional Pictures	Emotional Pictures	Amiga, C64, CD32, CDTV, DOS	Retitled Cover Girl Poker in Europe, except in Denmark.	
Crawlco Block Knockers	2019		Shady Corner Games	Switch, Win		
Criminal Girls 2: Party Favors	2016	Nippon Ichi Software	NIS America	PSV		
Criminal Girls: Invite Only	2015	Nippon Ichi Software	NIS America	PSV, Win	A remastered version of Criminal Girls with updated graphics and new features. The Windows version was released in 2017.	
Crisis Point: Extinction	TBA	Anon42		Win	In development, with Patreon supporters receiving access to the latest build of the game.	
Crush Crush	2016	Sad Panda Studios	Sad Panda Studios	Browser, Linux, Mac, Win, Switch		
Cunt Wars	2018		Hooligapps	Android, Browser		
Custer's Revenge	1982	American Multiple Industries	American Multiple Industries	Atari 2600	An alternate version of the game titled General Retreat was later released by PlayAround, after acquiring the rights to American Multiple Industries's titles. PlayAround would then rerelease the game as Westward Ho in Europe. Banned in the state of Oklahoma.	
Custom Order Maid 3D2	2019	KISS	S-court	Win		
Cute Demon Crashers	2015	SugarScript		Linux, Mac, Win	Created as a submission to the 2015 NaNoRenO visual novel game jam, but missed the completion deadline.	
Cute Girlfriends Explosions	2008	brainmelt	brainmelt	Java ME		
Cute Girlfriends Interactive	2006	brainmelt	brainmelt	Java ME		
Cyberstrip Poker	1995	Rapture Interactive	Rapture Interactive	Mac, Win		
D.P.S. Dream Program System SG	1990	AliceSoft	AliceSoft	FM Towns, PC-88, PC-98, X68000		
D.P.S. Dream Program System SG Set 2	1991	AliceSoft	AliceSoft	FM Towns, PC-88, PC-98, X68000		
D.P.S. Dream Program System SG Set 3	1991	AliceSoft	AliceSoft	FM Towns, PC-88, PC-98, X68000		
Da Capo	2002	Circus	Circus	Win		
Daily Sport Football Strip	2001	Smoking Gun Productions	Swing! Entertainment Media	Win	Originally titled Fußball Quiz in German, and was published as Daily Sport Football Strip in the rest of Europe by Conspiracy Entertainment.	
Dal'X	1995	Mediagogo	Mediagogo	Amiga, ST		
Dan Dolme	1994	Burning Dreams	Burning Dreams	DOS		
Dancing Eyes	1996	Namco	Namco	Arcade	A remake for the PlayStation 3 was planned as part of the Namco Generations series, but was cancelled.	
Dancing Mai	1991	FairyTale	FairyTale	MSX2, PC-98, X68000		
Dark Room Sex Game	2008			Mac, Win	Developed by IT students from the University of Copenhagen for the 2008 Nordic Game Jam.	
Days of Oblivion	1996	Toygardens Media	CDV Software Entertainment, Orion Versand	Win		
Days of Oblivion II: Frozen Eternity	2000	Toygardens Media	CDV Software Entertainment, Orion Versand	Win	Sequel to the 1996 game Days of Oblivion.	
DBVR	2003	Illusion	Illusion	Win		
Des Blood 4: Lost Alone	2002	Illusion	Illusion	Win		
Dick Sucks: Terror in Titfield	2004	Redfire Software	Redfire Software	Win		
Die Stadt der Löwen	1989	PM Entertainment	Software 2000	Amiga	Sequel to the 1988 game Holiday Maker.	
Digital Dancing: The Erotic Challenge	1993	Bonobo Productions	New Machine Publishing	Mac		
Dirty Dreams Poker: Blonde Edition	2006		Infospace	Java ME		
Dirty Dynamite Girls	2007	brainmelt	brainmelt	Java ME		
Divi-Dead	1998	C's Ware		Win		
Do You Like Horny Bunnies?	2001	ZyX	ZyX	Win	Originally titled Ecchi na Bani-san wa Kirai? in Japanese. English release was published by G-Collections.	
Do You Like Horny Bunnies? 2	2002	ZyX	ZyX	Win	Originally titled Ecchi na Bani-san wa Kirai? 2 in Japanese. Sequel to the 2001 game Do You Like Horny Bunnies?. English release was published by G-Collections.	
Dohna Dohna	2020	AliceSoft	JPN: AliceSoft; WW: Shiravune	Microsoft Windows		
Dominatrix Simulator: Threshold	TBA	deviant.tech	deviant.tech	Win	In development, with the game being in early access on Steam.	
Donna Matrix	1992	Reactor Inc.	Reactor Inc.	Mac		
Doors of Passion II	1995		RomSoft	Win		
Doushin Same Heart	2000	Crowd	Crowd	Win	The English version was published by Peach Princess.	
Dr. Amour: Zapping Movie Game	1994		Kuki	Mac, Win		
Dr. Ruth's Computer Game of Good Sex	1986	Avalon Hill	Avalon Hill	Apple II, C64, DOS	Based upon sex education by sex therapist Ruth Westheimer.	
Dramatical Murder	2012	Nitro+chiral	Nitro+chiral	Win	A PlayStation Vita version titled Dramatical Murder re:code was released with adult content removed.	
Dream Girls	1995	Microforum International	Softforum	Win		
Dream Lovers	1994		Four Players Productions	Mac		
The Dream Machine	1993		New Machine Publishing	DOS		
DreamStripper	2005	Ensign Games	Ensign Games	Win	Published by Astragon in Germany.	
Dress of Murder 2	1990	FairyTale	FairyTale	MSX2		
Dungeon Tail	TBA	OmegaOzone		Linux, Mac, Win	In development, with Patreon supporters receiving access to the latest build of the game, while an older version is free.	
The Eden of Grisaia	2012	Frontwing	Frontwing	Win	Third game in the Grisaia series. English version published by Sekai Project.	
eGirl	2004	eGirl Interactive		Win		
Emmanuelle	1989	Coktel Vision	Tomahawk	Amiga, DOS, ST	Loosely based on Emmanuelle Arsan's erotic novel Emmanuelle.	
Erotic Empire	2004	Zone 2 Studios	Rondomedia Marketing & Vertriebs	Win	Published by Leader in Italy.	
Erotic Pairs	2006	MEF	MEF	Java ME		
Erotic Solitaire with Adele Stephens	2006	Overloaded	Overloaded	Java ME	Stars UK glamour model Adele Stephens.	
Erotic Sudoku with Evelyn Lory	2007	Overloaded	Overloaded	Java ME	Stars Evelyn Lory.	
Erotic Voyeur 2	2008	Waat Media	Twistbox Games	Java ME		
Erotica Island	2001	Redfire Software	Flare Media Limited	Win		
Extended Stay	2021	Hearts Club	Hearts Club	Win		
Fallen Doll: Operation Lovecraft	TBA	Project Helius		Win	In development, with Patreon supporters receiving access to the latest build of the game.	
Fanta Scenes	1997		Digital Playground	Mac, Win		
Fap Titans	2017		Hooligapps	Android, Browser		
Fascination	1991	Coktel Vision	Tomahawk	Amiga, DOS, ST		
Femme Fatale	1989	Graphic Expressions	Graphic Expressions	Amiga		
Fetish Fighters	2003	BRZGames	Xing Interactive	Win		
Finding Eros	2007	eFusion	eFusion	Java ME		
Five Gals Connection	1988	I-cell	I-cell	MSX2		
Five Holy Girls	1987	SST, Studio Blue	Cosmos Computer	MSX, PC-88, PC-98, X1		
The Fox Pack Collection	1993		BodyCello	Mac		
Foxy	1990	ELF Corporation	ELF Corporation	MSX2, PC-88, PC-98		
Friday Night Pool	1995	Jonathan Harris		Amiga	Shareware title.	
The Fruit of Grisaia	2011	Frontwing	Frontwing	Win	First game in the Grisaia series. English version published by Sekai Project. A PlayStation Portable version was released that removes the game's sexual content.	
GAG 2: Back in the Future	2002	SGSoft	Меdiа 2000	Win	Sequel to the 1997 game GAG: The Impotent Mystery.	
GAG: The Impotent Mystery	1997	Zes't Studio	Noviy Disk	Win	An expansion was released in 1998 titled GAG + Harry on Vacation.	
Gal Gun Returns	2021	Inti Creates	Inti Creates	Switch, Win	Remaster of Gal Gun: Double Peace.	
Gal Gun: Double Peace	2015	Inti Creates	Alchemist	PS4, PSV, Win		
Gals Panic	1990	Kaneko	Kaneko	Arcade		
Geisha	1990	Coktel Vision	Tomahawk	Amiga, DOS, ST		
General Retreat	1983	PlayAround	PlayAround	Atari 2600	An alternate version of Custer's Revenge, as released by PlayAround after acquiring the rights to American Multiple Industries's titles. It was bundled with Wayard Ho, the retitled version of Custer's Revenge.	
Genital Jousting	2018	Free Lives	Devolver Digital	Mac, Win	Initially released on Steam in early access in 2016.	
Ghostly Desires	1995	Spice Interactive	Spice Interactive	Mac, Win		
Gibo: Stepmother's Sin	2004	Guilty	Guilty	Win	English version published by Peach Princess.	
Gigolo	1983	PlayAround	PlayAround	Atari 2600	The game is a reskinned version of Cathouse Blues. It was bundled with Bachelor Party, when PlayAround gained the rights to American Multiple Industries's titles	
Girl Gamble	2006		Infospace	Java ME		
Girlfriend Lisa	1993	Aldea Labs	Aldea Labs	DOS		
Girlfriend Suzy	1993	Aldea Labs	Aldea Labs	DOS		
Girlfriend Teri	1994		AIVR Corporation	DOS	A non-adult version with nudity removed was also released.	
Girlvania: Summer Lust	2014	Girlvanic Studios	Girlvanic Studios	Win		
Gize! XIX	1991	FairyTale	FairyTale	MSX2, PC-98, X68000		
Gotcha Babes X-Treme	2004	Redfire Software	Redfire Software	Win		
Granny's Place	1983	Temple Software	Temple Software	DOS		
Gun Gun Pixies	2017	Idea Factory, Compile Heart	PQube	PSV, Switch, Win		
The Guy Game	2004	Topheavy Studios	Gathering of Developers	PS2, Win, Xbox	Recalled from stores as a result of an injunction given in a lawsuit by a woman who appeared in the game when she was 17, meaning she was underage and unable to consent to being filmed.	
Hardcoded	TBA	Ghosthug Games	Ghosthug Games	Linux, Mac, Win	In development, with Patreon supporters receiving access to the latest build of the game.	
Heart de Roommate	2002	AngelSmile	AngelSmile	Win	English version published by G-Collections.	
Heat	TBA			Win	In development, with Patreon supporters receiving access to the latest build of the game.	
Hentai Pairs	2006	MEF	MEF	Java ME		
HentaII 3D	2002		thriXXX	Win		
Hitomi Kobayashi - Puzzle in London	1988	Informercial	Informercial	MSX2	Stars AV idol Hitomi Kobayashi.	
Holiday Maker	1988	PM Entertainment	Software 2000	Amiga		
Hollywood Poker	1987	Golden Games	Diamond Software	Amiga, C16, C64, Spectrum, ST		
Hollywood Poker Pro	1989	reLINE Software	reLINE Software	Amiga, C64, ST		
Holodexxx	TBA	Holodexxx	Holodexxx	Win	In development, with Patreon supporters receiving access to the latest build of the game.	
Honey Peach	1990	Sachen	Sachen	NES		
Honey Select	2016	Illusion	Illusion	Win		
Hot Leather 2	1997		Glowing Icon Publishing	Mac, Win		
Hot Slots	1991		Panesian	NES		
Hot Slots	1995		Vivid Interactive	Mac, Win		
House Party	2022	Eek! Games	Eek! Games	Win		
HunieCam Studio	2016	HuniePot	HuniePot	Linux, Mac, Win	Second game in the Hunie series.	
HuniePop	2015	HuniePot	HuniePot	Linux, Mac, Win		
HuniePop 2: Double Date	2021	HuniePot	HuniePot	Mac, Win	Third game in the Hunie series.	
Hunt and Snare	TBA	Ruffleneck, Hareress, Drathek	Ruffleneck	Win	In development, with the game being in early access on Steam.	
Hurt Me Plenty	2014	Robert Yang		Linux, Mac, Win	A remastered version is included in the 2016 video game compilation Radiator 2.	
Ibiza Babewatch	2000	RedFire Software	RedFire Software	Win	Published by CDV Software Entertainment in Germany.	
Ibiza Comic Poker	2000	Blackstar Interactive		Win		
Illumina	1991	Cocktail Soft	Cocktail Soft	MSX2		
Immoral Combat	1995	Zane	Fat Cat Productions	Mac, Win		
Immoral Cumbat	1995	CoreSoft	CoreSoft	DOS	Shareware title.	
Immoral Study	1996	Scoop Software Productions	Scoop Software Productions	PC-98, Win		
The Interactive Adventures of Seymore Butts II	1995		New Machine Publishing	Mac, Win	Stars Seymore Butts.	
The Interactive Adventures of Seymore Butts	1993		Pixis Interactive	Mac, Win	Stars Seymore Butts.	
Interactive Sex Therapy	1995	CPV Productions	Spice Interactive	Mac, Win		
Interlude II	1986		Recreational Technology	Apple II, DOS		
Jessika’s Curse	TBA	Venus Noire	Venus Noire	Win	In development, with Patreon supporters receiving access to the latest build of the game.	
Jewel Knights: Crusaders	2004	ZEROCOOL	ZEROCOOL	Win	English release was published by G-Collections.	
Jinkō Shōjo 2	2004	Illusion	Illusion	Win		
The Joy of Sex	1993	Cloudscan	Philips Interactive Media	CD-i	Based on the 1972 book of the same name by Alex Comfort.	
Jungle Fever	1983	PlayAround	PlayAround	Atari 2600	Released as a 2-in-1 cart with Knight on the Town	
Kama Sutra: Manara	1998	Mondadori New Media	index+	Mac, Win	Based on the graphic novel Manara's Kama Sutra by Milo Manara.	
Kana: Little Sister	2002	D.O.	D.O.	Win	English release was published by G-Collections.	
Kango Shicyauzo	2001	Trabulance	Trabulance	Win	English release was published by G-Collections.	
Kango Shicyauzo 2	2003	Trabulance	Trabulance	Win	English release was published by G-Collections.	
Kango Shicyauzo 4	2003	Trabulance	Trabulance	Win	English release was published by G-Collections.	
Kanon	1999	Key	Visual Arts	Android, Win	Versions with adult content removed were later released, along with ports to other platforms.	
Kara no Shōjo	2008	Innocent Grey	Innocent Grey	Win	English release was published by MangaGamer.	
Katawa Shoujo	2012	Four Leaf Studios	Four Leaf Studios	Linux, Mac, Win		
Kindred Spirits on the Roof	2012	Liar-soft	Liar-soft	Win	English release was published by MangaGamer.	
Knife Sisters	2019	Transcenders Media	Transcenders Media	Linux, Mac, Win		
Knight on the Town	1983	PlayAround	PlayAround	Atari 2600	A reskinned version of the game titled Lady in Wading was also released. It was bundled with Jungle Fever.	
Knights of Xentar	1992	ELF Corporation	ELF Corporation	DOS, FM Towns, PC-98, PC Engine CD, X68K	English release published by Megatech Software.	
Koikatsu Party	2019	Illusion	Illusion	Win		
La Colmena	1992	Opera Soft	Opera Soft	Amiga, DOS		
The Labyrinth of Grisaia	2012	Frontwing	Frontwing	Win	Second game in the Grisaia series. English version published by Sekai Project.	
Lady in Wading	1983	PlayAround	PlayAround	Atari 2600	The game is a reskinned version of Knight on the Town. It was packaged with Beat 'Em & Eat 'Em after PlayAround gained the rights to American Multiple Industries's titles.	
Lady Killer	1993		Mitchell Corporation	Arcade		
Ladykiller in a Bind	2016	Love Conquers All Games		Linux, Mac, Win		
Land Breaker	1999	Eolith	Eolith	Arcade		
The Late Night Sexy TV Show	1994	Dynabyte	Daze Marketing	DOS		
Le Déclic	1987			Amiga	Based on the erotic comic book series Click! by Milo Manara.	
Leather Skirts	1987	Methodic Solutions		MSX2		
Legend of Kamasutra	1993	Vivid Digital		DOS		
Leisure Suit Larry 5: Passionate Patti Does a Little Undercover Work	1991	Sierra On-Line	Sierra On-Line	Amiga, DOS, Mac, Win	Fourth game in the Leisure Suit Larry series.	
Leisure Suit Larry 6: Shape Up or Slip Out!	1993	Sierra On-Line	Sierra On-Line	DOS, Mac, Win	Fifth game in the Leisure Suit Larry series.	
Leisure Suit Larry Goes Looking for Love (in Several Wrong Places)	1988	Sierra On-Line	Sierra On-Line	Amiga, DOS, ST	Second game in the Leisure Suit Larry series.	
Leisure Suit Larry III: Passionate Patti in Pursuit of the Pulsating Pectorals	1989	Sierra On-Line	Sierra On-Line	Amiga, DOS, ST	Third game in the Leisure Suit Larry series.	
Leisure Suit Larry in the Land of the Lounge Lizards	1987	Sierra On-Line	Sierra On-Line	Amiga, Apple II, IIGS, DOS, Mac, ST, TRS-80	First game in the Leisure Suit Larry series.	
Leisure Suit Larry: Love for Sail!	1996	Sierra On-Line	Sierra On-Line	DOS, Mac, Win	Sixth game in the Leisure Suit Larry series.	
Leisure Suit Larry: Magna Cum Laude	2004	High Voltage Software	Sierra Entertainment	PS2, Win, Xbox	Seventh game in the Leisure Suit Larry series. Banned in Australia due to adult content.	
Les Manley in: Lost in L.A.	1991	Accolade	Accolade	DOS	Sequel to the 1990 game Les Manley in: Search for the King.	
Les Manley in: Search for the King	1990	Accolade	Accolade	Amiga, DOS		
Let's Meow Meow!	2004	Yamikumo Communications	Yamikumo Communications	Win	English release was published by G-Collections.	
Lightning Warrior Raidy	1994	ZyX	ZyX	DOS, FM Towns, PC-98, Win	English Windows release was published by G-Collections.	
Little My Maid	2004	Sweet Basil	Peach Princess	Win		
Little Princess	1986	Champion Soft	Champion Soft	FM-7, PC-88		
Live Strip Poker	2008	Microforum	Microforum	Java ME		
Logo	1990		Starbyte Software	Amiga, C64, DOS, ST		
Lolita Syndrome	1983	Katsumi Mochizuki	Enix	FM-7, PC-88	The winner of Enix's second bi-annual Game Hobby Program Contest.	
Lolita: Yakyūken	1982	PSK	PSK	FM-7, PC-88	The first game in PSK's Lolita trilogy.	
Love Death: Realtime Lovers	2005	Teatime	Illusion	Win		
LoveChess: Age of Egypt	2006	Artmunk Games	Artmunk Games	Win	Sequel to the 2004 game LoveChess: The Greek Era.	
LoveChess: The Greek Era	2004	Interstudio	Beat Games	Win		
Lover Boy	1983	Global Corporation Tokyo	Global Corporation Tokyo	Arcade		
Loving for a Lifetime	1995	Valkieser Multimedia	Philips Interactive Media	CD-i		
Lula 3D	2005	CDV Software Entertainment	CDV Software Entertainment	Win	Fifth game in the Lula series.	
Lula Pinball	1999	CDV Software Entertainment	CDV Software Entertainment	Win	Third game in the Lula series. Alternatively titled Lula Flipper.	
Lula: The Sexy Empire	1997	CDV Software Entertainment	Take-Two Interactive	Amiga, Win	First game in the Lula series. Alternatively titled Wet: The Sexy Empire.	
Lula: Virtual Babe	1998	CDV Software Entertainment	Take-Two Interactive	Win	Second game in the Lula series. Alternatively titled Lula Inside, and was included in the video game compilation 4 Play published by Take-Two Interactive in 1999.	
Lust Connection	1995		Interactive Classics	Win		
Lust for Darkness	2018	Movie Games Lunarium	Movie Games S.A., PlayWay S.A.	Mac, Switch, Win		
Lust from Beyond	2021	Movie Games Lunarium	Movie Games S.A., PlayWay S.A.	Win	Sequel to the 2018 game Lust for Darkness.	
MacPlaymate	1986		PEGASUS Productions	Mac		
The Maddams Family	1994		Digital Playground	Mac, Win	A porn parody of The Addams Family.	
Magix	1995		Yun Sung	Arcade		
Man Enough	1994	Tsunami Media	Tsunami Media	DOS		
Maria's Xmas Box	1988		Anco Software	Amiga, C64, ST	Stars glamour model Maria Whittaker.	
Masq	2002	Alteraction	Alteraction	Browser, Win		
Men In Motion	1995		RomAntics	Mac, Win		
Michael Ninn's Latex: The Game	1996	VCA Interactive	VCA Interactive	Mac, Win		
Mirror	2018	KAGAMI WORKS	Paradise Project	Mac, Win		
Moero Downhill Night Blaze	2007	TOP	TOP	Win	English release published by Peach Princess in 2012.	
Mokoko	2020	Naisu! Pink	Naisu! Pink	Linux, Mac, Win	Nudity is toggled through an optional patch on Steam.	
Monster Girl Island	TBA	Redamz	Redamz	Win	In development, with Patreon supporters receiving access to the latest build of the game.	
Mozaika Zhelaniy	2001	Cherry Soft	Руссобит-М	Win		
Muv-Luv	2003	âge	âge	Win		
Naked Babe Soccer	2008	brainmelt	brainmelt	Java ME		
Nasty Parts	1995	VCA Interactive	VCA Interactive	Win		
Naughty America: The Game	2006		Naughty America	Win		
Naughty Sandbox	TBA	Naughty Sandbox	Naughty Sandbox	Win	In development, with Patreon supporters receiving access to the latest build of the game.	
Negligee: Love Stories	2018	Dharker Studios Limited	Dharker Studios Limited	Linux, Mac, Win		
NeuroDancer: Journey Into the Neuronet!	1994	Pixis Interactive	Electric Dreams	3DO, Mac, Win		
Never Ending Fantasy Machine	2001	Exo Studios	Exo Studios	Win		
Night Seep	1991		Play	PC-98		
Nightwatch	1993		Interotica	Mac		
Nightwatch Interactive	1992	Interotica	Interotica	Mac, Win		
Nikto ne Znayet Pro Seks	2006	Central Partnership, Macho Studio	Macho Studio	Win		
Nocturnal Illusion	1995	Apricot	Apricot	Win		
Novyye Eroticheskiye Igrushki	2000	ExE-Soft	Руссобит-М	Win		
Ojousama Kurabu	1988		Tokuma Communications	MSX2		
Omega Labyrinth	2015	Matrix Software	D3 Publisher	PSV	First game in the Omega Labyrinth series.	
Omega Labyrinth Life	2019	Matrix Software	D3 Publisher	PS4, Switch, Win	Third game in the Omega Labyrinth series.	
Omega Labyrinth Z	2017	Matrix Software	D3 Publisher	PS4, PSV	Second game in the Omega Labyrinth series. Banned in Australia due to "gratuitous, exploitative or offensive depictions" of characters under the age of 18, and implied sexual assault. Also banned in the UK due to pedophilic content.	
Pairs	1989		Nichibutsu	Arcade		
Panty Raider: From Here to Immaturity	2000	Hypnotix	Simon & Schuster Interactive	Win		
Paradise Heights	1994	Foster	Foster	FM Towns, PC-98, Win		
Party Island: Sexy Trivia	2008		Digital Chocolate	Java ME		
Passion Pinball	1999	Cherrysoft	Blackstar Interactive	Win		
Patti Pain's Bondage Poker	2000	Redfire Software	Redfire Software	Win		
Peach Sexagon	2008	Delight Entertainment	Waat Media	Java ME		
Peek-A-Boo Poker	1991		Panesian	NES		
Peep Show	1987	Crusader Software	Crusader Software	CPC		
Penetration	1995		RomSoft	Win		
Penthouse Electric Jigsaw	1991	microPHAZE	Merit Software	DOS		
Penthouse Hot Numbers	1993	reLINE Software	Magic Bytes	Amiga, DOS		
Penthouse Hot Numbers Deluxe	1994	eleven Software	Magic Bytes	Amiga, DOS		
Penthouse Interactive Virtual Photo Shoot	1993	ICFX	Penthouse Interactive	3DO, Mac, Win		
Philly Flasher	1983	PlayAround	PlayAround	Atari 2600	The game is a reskinned version of Beat 'Em & Eat 'Em, as released by PlayAround after acquiring the rights to American Multiple Industries's titles.	
Picture Blackjack: Penthouse Edition	1996	DreaMedia Technologies		Win		
Pipi & Bibi's	1991	Toaplan	Toaplan	Arcade		
Pirates Poker XXX	2008	Laxity Media	Twistbox Games	Java ME		
Pirates Sexy Black Jack	2009		Twistbox Games	Java ME		
Planet of Lust	1989	Free Spirit Software	Free Spirit Software	Amiga, DOS, ST	Second game in the Brad Stallion series.	
Plastilinovaya Kama-Sutra	2005	MixMedia Labs	МедиаХауз	Win		
Playboy Black Jack	2007	Qplaze		Java ME		
Playboy Poker	2007	Qplaze		Java ME		
Playboy Slot Machine	2007	Qplaze		Java ME		
Playboy: The Mansion	2005	Cyberlore Studios	Arush Entertainment, Groove Games	PS2, Win, Xbox	An expansion titled Playboy: The Mansion - Private Party was released in 2005.	
Playboy's Complete Massage	1994		Philips Interactive Media	CD-i		
Playhouse Strippoker	1988		Eurosoft	Amiga, DOS, MSX, ST		
Plody Zhelaniy	2003	STEP Creative Group	Macho Studio	Win		
Plumbers Don't Wear Ties	1993	United Pixtures	United Pixtures	3DO, DOS, PS4, PS5, Switch	Ported to the Nintendo Switch, PlayStation 4, and PlayStation 5 in 2021 by Limited Run Games.	
Pocket Gal	1987	Data East	Data East	Arcade		
Pocket Pool	2007	Hyper-Devbox	Eidos Interactive	PSP		
Pocket Waifu	2018	JNT	Nutaku	Android, Browser, Win		
Poker Ladies	1989	Mitchell Corporation	Mitchell Corporation	Arcade		
Poker Nights: Teresa Personally	1993	Escal Software	VTO Pictures	Amiga	Stars Teresa Orlowski.	
Poker Party	1995		Digital Video Productions	Mac, Win		
Porn Manager	2006	HandyGames	HandyGames	Java ME		
Porn Manager 2	2007	HandyGames	HandyGames	Java ME	Sequel to the 2006 game Porn Manager.	
Porn Tycoon	2010	HandyGames	HandyGames	Java ME		
Pornstar 3D: Hail to the Beef	2002	Caligula Games	Caligula Games	Win		
Private Dancer	2002	Kaboom Studios	Kaboom Studios	Win		
Private Investigator	1996	Image-Line	Private USA	Win		
Private Nurse	2003	Angel Smile	G-Collections	Win		
Purino Party	2016	Frontwing	Frontwing USA	Win		
Pussy Saga	2017		Hooligapps	Android, Browser		
Quidget The Wonderwiener	TBA	TeamTailnut		Browser	In the alpha stage of development, with Patreon supporters accessing features not in the public build.	
Rack 2	TBA	Fek	Fek	Win	In development, with Patreon supporters receiving access to the latest build of the game.	
Radiator 2	2016	Robert Yang		Linux, Mac, Win	Video game compilation including remastered versions of Hurt Me Plenty, Succulent, and Stick Shift.	
Randevu s Neznakomkoy 2	2001	ExE-Soft	Руссобит-М	Win	Second game in the Randevu s Neznakomkoy series.	
Randevu s Neznakomkoy: Zapretnaya Zona	2004	ExE-Soft	Руссобит-М	Win	Third game in the Randevu s Neznakomkoy series.	
Rapelay	2006	Illusion	Illusion	Win	Banned in several countries, including Argentina, Indonesia, and New Zealand due to graphic depictions of rape.	
Real Girls Strip Poker	2002	Pokai Software	Pokai Software	Win		
Reborn in Sin	TBA	aphrodisia	aphrodisia	Android, Linux, Mac, Win	Was created following a successful Kickstarter campaign that raised $21,263, exceeding its goal of $8,000. In development, with Patreon supporters receiving access to the latest build of the game.	
Red Light Center	2005	Utherverse Digital	Utherverse Digital	Win		
Red Lights of Amsterdam	1986	The Bytebusters	Eaglesoft	MSX2		
The Reel World	1997		Forbidden Films	Mac, Win		
Riana Rouge	1997	Black Dragon Productions	Black Dragon Productions	Win		
Ring Out!!	1995	ZyX	ZyX	FM Towns, PC-98, Win		
Rinse and Repeat	2015	Robert Yang		Linux, Mac, Win		
Romantic Encounters at the Dome	1987	MicroIllusions	MicroIllusions	Amiga, DOS, Mac		
Rotlicht Tycoon	2003	i3D Software, Soft Enterprises	Rondomedia	Win	Russian release developed by Boolat Games.	
The Sagara Family	2004	ZyX	ZyX	Win	English release published by G-Collections.	
Saturday Night Snooker	1996	Jonathan Harris		Amiga	Shareware title. Sequel to the 1995 game Friday Night Pool.	
Saya no Uta	2003	Nitroplus	Nitroplus	Win	English release published by JAST USA.	
School Days	2005	0verflow	0verflow	Win	A version for the PlayStation 2 titled School Days LxH was released with adult content removed.	
Scissors N' Stones	1994		Pixis Interactive	Mac, Win		
Secret Wives Club	2003	Sekilala	Sekilala	Win	English release was published by G-Collections.	
Seduce Me	2013	No Reply Games	No Reply Games	Win		
Sensei 2	2003	D.O.	D.O.	Win	English release was published by G-Collections.	
Sex & Money	1995		Pixis Interactive	Mac, Win		
Sex at the Pool	2008	Delight Entertainment	Waat Media	Java ME		
Sex Bomb!	2008	Tequila Mobile	Twistbox Games	Java ME		
Sex Empire	2008	NewEdge	Alawar NewEdge Mobile	Java ME		
Sex Games	1985	Landisoft		C64		
Sex Olympics	1991	Free Spirit Software	Free Spirit Software	Amiga, DOS, ST	The fourth & final game in the Brad Stallion series.	
Sex on the Floor	2008	Twistbox Games	Twistbox Games	Java ME		
Sex on the Rocks	2008	Twistbox Games	Twistbox Games	Java ME		
Sex Vixens from Space	1988	Free Spirit Software	Free Spirit Software	Amiga, Apple II, C64, DOS, ST	First game in the Brad Stallion series.	
Sex with Hitler	2020	Romantic Room	Romantic Room	Win		
Sex with Stalin	2020	Boobs Dev	Mova Games	Win		
The Sexual Edge	1988	Merrill Ward Designerware		C64		
Sexversi	1994	Doomsday Developments	Mirage Software	Atari 8-bit		
SeXXcapades	1991	Sexxy Software	Sexxy Software	DOS		
Sexy Babes Wild Waterslides	2006		Glu Mobile	Java ME		
Sexy Beach 2	2003	Illusion	Illusion	Win	An expansion titled Chiku Chiku Beach was released in 2004.	
Sexy Beach 3	2006	Illusion	Illusion	Win		
Sexy Blocks: Cancun Vibes	2007	Gameloft	Gameloft	Java ME		
Sexy Droids	1992	eleven Software	Magic Bytes	Amiga, DOS	Sequel to the 1989 game Blue Angel 69.	
Sexy Fairy Rings	2008	Twistbox Games	Twistbox Games	Java ME		
Sexy Gems	2008	Laxity Media	Twistbox Games	Java ME		
Sexy Memo	1994		VTO Pictures	Win	Stars Teresa Orlowski.	
Sexy Orgynizer	2008	Twistbox Games		Java ME		
Sexy Pillowfight	2007	Capybara Games	I-play	Java ME		
Sexy Poker	2009	Gameloft	Gameloft	Win		
Sexy Poker 2004	2004	Gameloft	Gameloft	Java ME		
Sexy Poker 2006	2006	Gameloft	Gameloft	Java ME	Sequel to Sexy Poker 2004.	
Sexy Pool	2006	Indiagames	Indiagames	Java ME		
Sexy Puzzle 2	2006	HandyGames	HandyGames	Java ME		
Sexy Queens	2006	Tequila Mobile	Twistbox Games	Java ME		
Sexy Six	1995		Sikor Soft	Atari 8-bit	Three data disks were released for the game.	
Sexy Soccer	2006		Infospace	Java ME		
Sexy Twins 1	2008	HandyGames	HandyGames	Java ME		
Sexy Vegas	2006		Gameloft	Java ME		
Sileo: Tales of a New Dawn	TBA	Werecat Entertainment	Werecat Entertainment	Android, Linux, Mac, Win	In development, with Patreon supporters receiving access to the latest build of the game.	
Singles 2: Triple Trouble	2005	Rotobee Realtime 3D	Deep Silver	Win	Sequel to the 2004 game Singles: Flirt Up Your Life.	
Singles: Flirt Up Your Life	2004	Rotobee Realtime 3D	Eidos Interactive	Win		
Slave Pageant	2004	Ignition	Ignition	Win	English release was published by G-Collections.	
Smutstone	2018		Hooligapps	Android, Browser		
Snow Drop	2002	Sweet Basil	Sweet Basil	Win	English version published by Peach Princess.	
Softporn Adventure	1981	Blue Sky Software	On-Line Systems	Apple II, Atari 8-bit, DOS, FM-7, PC-88, PC-98, X1	This game served as the basis for Leisure Suit Larry in the Land of the Lounge Lizards.	
Space Sirens	1994		Pixis Interactive	Mac, Win		
Stick Shift	2015	Robert Yang		Linux, Mac, Win	A remastered version is included in the 2016 video game compilation Radiator 2.	
Strange Flesh	2018	Greatest Bear Studios	Greatest Bear Studios	Browser, Mac, Win	Open source under Creative Commons BY-NC-SA 3.0.	
Strip Blackjack	1995		OEM	Mac, Win		
Strip Club Manager	2008	Digital Chocolate	Digital Chocolate	Java ME		
Strip Concentration & Dice	1979		Phase-80/Adventure International	TRS-80		
Strip Poker	1987		Talent Computer Systems	Sinclair QL		
Strip Poker de Luxe	1994		Digital Dreams Multimedia	Win		
Strip Poker II	1988	Artworx	Artworx	Amiga, Apple, DOS, ST		
Strip Poker II+	1988		Anco Software	Amiga, BBC, C16, C64, CPC, DOS, MSX, Spectrum, ST	Released by Anco Software as a sequel to Strip Poker: A Sizzling Game of Chance by Artworx, in addendum to Artworx's own sequel, Strip Poker II, to which Strip Poker II+ has no relation.	
Strip Poker III	1991	Artworx	Artworx	Amiga, DOS	Retitled Deluxe Strip Poker 2 in Europe, except in Spain.	
Strip Poker Live!	1994	GreenPig Production	Interlance Publishing BV, Giunti Multimedia	CD-i, DOS		
Strip Poker: A Sizzling Game of Chance	1982	Artworx	Artworx	Amiga, Apple II, Atari 8-bit, C16, C64, DOS, ST	The Commodore 16 and Commodore Plus/4 versions of the game were published by Anco Software. Three data disks, with two new opponents each, were released; two with female opponents, and one disk with male opponents.	
Strip Pot	1994	Pixel Blue	Guildhall Leisure Services	Amiga, CD32		
Strip-Poker Pro	1994	Interactive Pictures	HotStage	CD-i, DOS		
Stroker	1983	Magic Carpet Software	Magic Carpet Software	C64		
Subverse	TBA	FOW Interactive	Streembit	Win	In development, with the game being in early access on Steam.	
Summertime Saga	TBA	Kompas Productions	Kompas Productions	Android, Linux, Mac, Win	In development, with Patreon supporters receiving access to the latest build of the game, while older builds are free.	
Sven 004	2004	ak tronic Software & Services	Phenomedia Publishing	Win	Fourth game in the Sven Bømwøllen series.	
Sven Kommt!	2005	ak tronic Software & Services	Phenomedia Publishing	Win	Fifth game in the Sven Bømwøllen series.	
Sven XXX	2003	ak tronic Software & Services	Phenomedia Publishing	Win	Third game in the Sven Bømwøllen series.	
Sven: Gut zu Vogeln	2006	ak tronic Software & Services	Phenomedia Publishing	Win	Sixth game in the Sven Bømwøllen series.	
Sylvia Saint in Erotic Pool	2007	Overloaded	Overloaded	Java ME	Stars Silvia Saint.	
Taimanin Asagi	2005	LiLith	Black Lilith	Win		
Tainstvennyy Otel' Eroticheskiy Kvest	2000	ShowGirls Soft	Медиа 2000	Win		
Teenage Queen	1988		ERE Informatique	Amiga, CPC, DOS, ST		
Three Sisters' Story	1996	Sakura Soft	Sakura Soft	DOS, PC-98, Win	English Windows release published by JAST USA.	
Tokimeki Check-in!	2001	Crowd Co.	Crowd Co.	Win	English version published by Peach Princess.	
Tokyo Nightlife Interactive	1995		A6 Interactive	Mac, Win		
Tottemo Pheromone	2002	TRABULANCE	TRABULANCE	Win	English release published by G-Collections.	
Transfer Student	2002	JAST USA	JAST USA	Win		
Trials in Tainted Space	TBA	Fenoxo		Android, Browser	In development, with Patreon supporters receiving access to the latest build of the game.	
Triple X Tycoon	2020	Joy-Toilet	Outhouz	Win	Was funded through a successful Indiegogo campaign in 2015 that reached its funding goal of US$1,000.	
Tsuki Possession	2003	ZyX	ZyX	Win	English release published by G-Collections.	
UltraVixen	1997	Akuma Studios	Pixis Interactive	Win		
UltraVixen 2	1999	Pixis Interactive	Pixis Interactive	Win	Sequel to the 1997 game UltraVixen.	
Uncover It	1994	NSG	Mirage Software	DOS		
Undercover Babes	2006		Infospace	Java ME		
Uragoner	TBA	Uragon Games	Uragon Games	Mac, Win	In development, with Patreon supporters receiving access to the latest build of the game.	
Vampire's Kiss	1995		Digital Playground	Mac, Win		
Vanquish	2004	Forst	Forst	Win		
Vegas Girls	1994	Status Visual Communication	Telstar Electronic Studios	CD-i, DOS, Macintosh		
Velikolepnyy Vovochka 2: Geroy Eroticheskikh Snov!	2003	Macho Studio	Macho Studio	Win		
The Velvet Express	2008	Artmunk Games	Artmunk Games	Win		
Victoria's Dirty Amateurs	2008	brainmelt	brainmelt	Java ME		
Victoria's Dirty Secrets	2006	brainmelt	brainmelt	Java ME		
Victoria's Naughty Games	2006	brainmelt	brainmelt	Java ME		
Video Strip Poker Supreme	2006	Torquemada Games	Torquemada Games	Win		
Virgin Roster	2003	ZyX	ZyX	Win	English release published by G-Collections.	
Viro Playspace	TBA	Virtual Romance	Virtual Romance	Win	In development, with the game being in early access on Steam.	
Virt-A-Mate	TBA	Meshed VR	Meshed VR	Win	In development, with Patreon supporters receiving access to the latest build of the game.	
Virtual Escort	1994		Penthouse France	Mac, Win		
Virtual Eve	2006	Eve Interactive	Eve Interactive	Win		
Virtual Valerie	1989	Reactor Inc.	Reactor Inc.	Mac		
Virtual Valerie 2	1995	Reactor Inc.	Reactor Inc.	DOS		
Virtually Jenna	2005		xStream3D Multimedia	Win	Stars Jenna Jameson.	
Virtually Yours	1995		Glowing Icon Publishing	Mac, Win		
Vivid Bombs 'n' Boobs	2007	Delight Entertainment	Twistbox Games	Java ME		
Vivid Gems	2007	Delight Entertainment	Twistbox Games	Java ME		
Voyeur	1993	Philips POV Entertainment	Philips Interactive	CD-i, DOS, Mac	Banned in Australia due to a scene mentioning the sexual assault of a child.	
Voyeur II	1996	InterWeave Entertainment	Philips Media	CD-i, DOS, Mac, Win	Sequel to the 1993 game Voyeur.	
VR Kanojo	2017	Illusion	Illusion	Win		
Waifu Uncovered	2020	One-Hand-Free Studios	eastasiasoft	Switch, Win		
Watch Me in My House	2002	Redfire Software	CDV Software Entertainment	Win		
Water Closet: The Forbidden Chamber	2001	Will Japan	Will Japan	Win	English version published by Peach Princess.	
We Dare	2011	Ubisoft Milan	Ubisoft	PS3, Wii		
Wet Attack: The Empire Cums Back	1999	Interactive Strip	CDV Software Entertainment	Win	Fourth game in the Lula series.	
Wild Party	1983	B&B Software	B&B Software	TRS-80		
Wonderful Everyday	2010	KeroQ	KeroQ	Win	English release published by Frontwing.	
X-Change	1997	Crowd Co.	Crowd Co.	Win	English version published by Peach Princess.	
X-Change 2	1999	Crowd Co.	Crowd Co.	Win	English version published by Peach Princess.	
Yakyūken	1979	Miso Ramen Group	Hudson Soft	MZ-80K	Yakyūken is a strip game of scissors-paper-rock derived from the variety show Konto 55-gō no Urabangumi wo Buttobase!	
The Yakyuken Special	1994	Societa Daikanyama	Societa Daikanyama	3DO, Saturn		
Yin-Yang! X-Change Alternative	2004	Crowd Co.	Crowd Co.	Win	Remaster of X-Change with alternate endings. English release published by G-Collections.	
Yukkuri Panic Escalation	2007	Rolling Star	Rolling Star	Win	English release was published by JAST USA.	
Zettai Fukuju Meirei	2005	Langmaor	Langmaor	Win	English version titled Absolute Obedience published by Peach Princess.	

== See also ==
- List of eroge
