= Cobra Club =

2015 video game

- itch.io version cover
- Developer: Robert Yang
- Platforms: Linux, macOS, Windows
- Release: 18 May 2015
- Mode: Single-player

Cobra Club is a 2015 video game by independent developer Robert Yang. Players navigate a fictitious mobile application as a nude character standing before a mirror to take and send dick pics as customisable photos of their character's penis. These images, shared initially with other automated users of the platform, are revealed at the end of the game to have been uploaded without the player's awareness to an online page on blogging website Tumblr. Inspired by critiques of mass surveillance and the privacy issues of dating apps, Yang developed Cobra Club to provide players with a "safer space" to simulate taking dick pics and make the player aware of the data and privacy implications of those practices in real life.

Upon release, Cobra Club was met with critical and academic interest, with reviewers finding the game to be an amusing and highly customisable representation of self-experimentation, and academic writers commenting on the game's representation of the interactions between identity, self-exploration, technology and privacy. A remastered version of the game was uploaded by Yang in 2016. Following release, the game's online component was affected by a site-wide adult content ban on Tumblr and streaming ban on Twitch, prompting comments from Yang about the impact of censorship on queer and adult online content.

== Gameplay ==
Censored gameplay screenshot, depicting the appearance and camera controls and sliders on the user interface.

In Cobra Club, players take and receive ingame dick pics by interacting with the interface of a fictitious mobile application. Starting as a randomly-generated character standing naked before a mirror, players can use onscreen sliders and buttons to change the perspective to take pictures of their character, and unlock options to change their physical features, including the shape, size and erectness of the penis and testicles, and options to change their appearance in unrealistic ways. Other features include the ability to select image filters to change the color of the photos taken. The interface features periodic automated messages purporting to be from other users of the application, who request and send dick pics of their own, from which the player receives and can respond to abstract messages such as "hyper combo finish" or "show me your Pikachu". After 15 to 25 minutes of play, the player will be notified that their images, chat transcript and username hashtag have been uploaded to a "government spy database" named COBRACLUBB. It is revealed to the player that the social features of Cobra Club are not entirely simulated, but are connected to an online platform, with the game uploading the pictures taken by the player onto a public Tumblr page. The game features a privacy agreement and a procedurally-generated random name to protect the anonymity of the player.

== Development ==
Cobra Club was developed by Robert Yang, a queer independent game developer and academic associated with the New York University Game Center. The game is part of a series created by Yang with a focus on gay culture and sex, including other works such as Hurt Me Plenty (2014), Rinse and Repeat (2015), and The Tearoom (2017). Yang was influenced to create Cobra Club after exploring political critiques of mass surveillance, primarily taking inspiration from a 2015 interview between John Oliver and Edward Snowden on Last Week Tonight, in which Oliver jokes with Snowden about the mass collection of "dick pics" by the National Security Agency. Yang was dissatisfied with an initial prototype focused on saturating the Internet with user-generated images, titled Dick Pics 4 Freedom, finding the concept too "obvious and boring". Instead, the game was redesigned to explore the "muddy relationship to identity and context" and the political and cultural dimension of taking a dick pic. To achieve this, Yang modelled the game around the design of "purpose-built gay male dating sites" and applications, including Adam4Adam.

Yang aimed to create a positive representation of the act of creating and sharing dick pics, "disconnected from beauty standards and body shaming", in an attempt to "establish a sort of safer space to explore dick pics" through the medium. Yang sought to represent diverse body types in the game by randomising the skin colour and dimensions of the player character in each playthrough, and preventing players from initially changing these attributes. However, Yang also sought to deconstruct this experience, stating that that game's meaning was focused on the twist of the nonconsensual disclosure of the player's efforts to illustrate "how surveillance and systems of control work".

As of September 2017, Yang stated that 75,000 player-generated pictures had been uploaded to the game's database. In 2018, in reaction to the announced ban of adult content on Tumblr on December 17, Yang migrated the networked component of Cobra Club to a Twitter account to preserve the functionality of the game and its 100,000 user-created images. Yang publicly expressed discontent with censorship of Cobra Club and his other adult works, citing the Tumblr ban on the game and a ban of broadcasting the game on Twitch as moderation of queer adult games that were "policing sex and queerness" and limiting the audience for this content. In 2016, Yang re-released a revised and updated version of Cobra Club, featuring "completely new dick, pubic hair [and] strap-on support".

== Reception ==
Cobra Club received praise from video game publications and writers. Several writers, including Laura Hudson of Boing Boing and Patricia Hernandez of Kotaku found the game to depict a more positive representation of sending and receiving dick pics, in contrast to their often "unwanted and unsolicited" nature for women. Zack Kotzer of Vice found the game to be the "most explicit and engaging" of Yang's work to date, describing it as "subversive", "mysterious", and "intimidating". Philippa Warr of Rock Paper Shotgun noted the game's unusually broad level of customisation and experimentation open to the player, stating "it's comical but you also end up focusing on the aesthetics rather than the fact it's a penis". Laura Dale of Destructoid praised the "real level of depth and social commentary" behind the game's "interesting and intellectual message" about online data security. Paolo Pedercini described the game as "the best of the series" of Yang's games and "the one that most effectively demands to exist in our thoughts".

Several media and game design academics have discussed the themes of Cobra Club. Rob Gallagher, a postdoctoral researcher at King's College London, characterised Cobra Club as a playful and political game, commending its treatment of themes of privacy, technology, privacy and consent, particularly its exploration of the interaction between digital social behaviour and surveillance. Gallagher also found the game to be effective representation of the interaction between technology and individual expression, stating "for all its humour, the game suggests the importance of the smartphone as a means of mediating between public and private spaces and facilitating experiments in self-experimentation". Eron Rauch, an artist and fine arts professor at the California Institute of the Arts, stated the game "calls us to engage from new perspectives with the ways that we navigate representations of our seemingly private bodies and their alternating shameful, intrusive, or erotic functions in digital communications technologies". Bonnie Ruberg highlighted the game's "sense of humor", stating the game "simultaneously pokes fun at and revels in “dick pic” culture, making the gay male body the site of play and suggesting that queer erotic practices are taking place behind closed doors". Todd Harper, an assistant professor at the University of Baltimore and postdoctoral researcher at the MIT Game Lab, commended the "clever" and "fun" design of the game, he critiqued the game for not simulating elements of risk, vulnerability, and fear related to real-world practices of taking and sharing intimate images.
