= Tearoom (disambiguation) =

Tearoom may refer to:

- Teahouse, a drinking establishment for tea and sometimes cake or light meals
- Chashitsu, a Japanese architectural space
- Tearoom Trade: A Study of Homosexual Encounters in Public Places (1970), a book by Laud Humphreys
- The Tearoom, a game by Robert Yang
- A 'tearoom', a public toilet where cottaging (gay sex) occurs
