= MadSpace =

1997 video game

MadSpace: To Hell and Beyond
- Developer: Maddox Games
- Publishers: Auric Vision; Nightdive Studios
- Platform: DOS
- Release: 1997
- Genre: First-person shooter
- Modes: Single-player, multiplayer

MadSpace is a first-person shooter video game developed by Maddox Games and published in 1997 by Auric Vision for MS-DOS. The game received mixed reviews, with critics finding its integration of speech and virtual reality interesting, but describing the game as dated in gameplay and premise.

== Gameplay ==
Gameplay screenshot

MadSpace is a first-person shooter video game set across 25 levels. The game supported available virtual reality glasses, including the i-Glasses and 3D Max.

== Development ==
Development of MadSpace was led by Maddox Games, the studio of founder Oleg Maddox. The studio developed the title for a year and a half, and focused efforts on a speech recognition model for the game designed to minimise system resources. It was the debut title of Russian publisher Auric Vision, who announced the game with one of four titles, including GAG The Impotent Mystery, Z.A.R. and Hippo Stories. According to Maddox, around 30,000 copies of MadSpace were distributed, although some included bootleg copies seized by Russia's Ministry of Internal Affairs. He remarked that the game's inclusion of non-human enemies helped sales in Germany due to censorship of certain content.

== Reception ==
Several reviewers expressed mixed opinions about early demo versions of the game. Svet Kompjutera considered the game had "beautiful animation", but generally had "complicated controls" and an "outdated engine, poor graphics, no sound and weak action". The Games Machine felt the demo lacked technical quality and was "nothing special" but the control system and voice recognition was promising and innovative. CD-Action enjoyed the game's graphics engine, highlighting the detail of its textures, and felt the controls were smooth, but dismissed the game as "another" version of Doom and felt it "doesn't bring anything new to the genre" and predicted it would go unnoticed. Describing the game as "outdated", CD Guru considered the game's graphics were "weak" and lacked new ideas, the enemies and settings "simplistic", and everything else "mediocre".
