= Robert Yang =

Indie game developer and artist

- 杨若波
- Occupation: Video game developer
- Known for: Video games/art
- Notable work: Intimate, Infinite and The Tearoom
- Website: debacle.us

Robert Yang (Chinese: 杨若波) is an academic, artist, and indie video game developer, whose work often explores gay subculture and the boundary between video games and art. His work focuses particularly on sociologically deviant and sometimes illegal sexual behavior. His projects include Borges adaptation Intimate, Infinite and The Tearoom, a game that involves soliciting sex in a public toilet. He is a former member of faculty at NYU Tisch School of the Arts's Game Center and curated their annual indie game exhibition in 2015.

== Early life and education ==
Yang grew up in Orange County in Southern California. He developed an interest in game making in high school, creating maps for StarCraft, Counter-Strike and Half-Life. He attended the University of California, Berkeley as an undergraduate studying a Bachelor of Arts in English Literature, and in 2012, moved to New York City to undertake a Design and Technology MFA at the Parsons School of Design.

== Career ==
=== Game design ===
Yang's independent work began with Radiator, a series of mods for Half-Life 2 developed in the Source engine. In 2014, Yang began work on a series of titles self-described as "gay sex games", out of a desire to challenge audiences and depict sex "as part of what makes gay communities".

=== Academic ===
Yang's academic career began under a student-led teaching program at the University of California Berkeley where he taught video game level design for several semesters, using Counter-Strike: Source, StarCraft, Trackmania and non-digital games.

== Works ==
Year	Title
2011	Super Cult Tycoon 2
2011	Apollo 2
2012	Souvenir
2014	Intimate, Infinite
2014	Hurt Me Plenty
2015	Succulent
2015	Stick Shift
2015	Radiator 1
2015	Cobra Club
2015	Rinse and Repeat
2016	Radiator 2
2016	No Stars, Only Constellations
2017	The Tearoom
2018	Dream Hard
2018	Ruck Me
2020	Hard Lads
2021	We Dwell in Possibility
2022	Logjam
2022	Zugzwang
2022	That Lonesome Valley

=== Intimate, Infinite ===
Intimate, Infinite is an art game adaptation of Jorge Luis Borges's story "The Garden of Forking Paths", which itself played with genre. The game comprises three subgames which explore themes of repetition, infinity, and sudden endings, taken from the story.

=== Cobra Club ===
Cobra Club is a photo studio game that involves the player taking pictures of their character's penis. The player can interact with different NPCs and trade "dick pics" with each other. The game was banned by the live-streaming platform Twitch for its sexual content.

=== Hurt Me Plenty ===
Released in 2014, Hurt Me Plenty is a video game based on BDSM subculture that simulates a scene in which players negotiate and perform spanking on a virtual partner, with the player required to respect consent and the boundaries agreed with the partner to replay the game.

=== Rinse and Repeat ===
Rinse and Repeat was released in 2015. It takes place at a public shower room. The player has to rub down other men. The game was widely banned on Twitch for its extensive nudity.

=== The Tearoom ===
The Tearoom (2017) alludes to the gay sexual practice of cottaging. Players must stand at a urinal and make eye contact with a neighbor until a power bar fills up and oral sex begins. Players must also avoid being spotted by police officers. Instead of penises, it shows guns. The game parodies or critiques aspects of other games: the presence of non-functioning toilets in other video games; the way games normally allow players to look at everything without being penalised; and the different attitudes of the video game industry to sex (largely prohibited) and violence (almost omni-present). The game was mostly based on Laud Humphreys' 1970s book, Tearoom Trade.

=== Other games ===
Yang's shorter games include Succulent, a game that allows the player character to have oral sex with an unknown orange object, possibly a corndog or a popsicle; Stick Shift (2015), a short driving game about pleasuring a gay car; and No Stars, Only Constellations, a stargazing game about relationship breakups and alien life. A few of Yang's games were released on Steam in a collection called Radiator 2. In 2021, Yang created "We Dwell in Possibility", a free online experience.

== Reception ==
Yang's work has often been described in terms of its experimental and explicit qualities, and representative of an increasing exploration of queer sex and sexuality in the video game medium. Ruberg describes Yang as one of several independent developers who have been "instrumental in exploring how queerness can be expressed through games and in bringing queer indie games to a wider audience", praising his works for their "nuanced set of artistic and political intentions" and challenging nature for queer and mainstream audiences.
