= Lee Rainwater =

American sociologist (1928–2015)

- Born: 7 January 1928; Oxford, Mississippi
- Died: 4 July 2015 (aged 87); Cambridge, Massachusetts
- Occupation: Sociologist

Lee Rainwater (7 January 1928 – 4 July 2015) was an American sociologist. He was a professor of sociology at Harvard University for 23 years and was a co-founder of the Luxembourg Income Study, for which he was research director between 1983 and 2005. He was the author, co-author, or editor of over twenty books, including Behind Ghetto Walls: Black Families in a Federal Slum (1970), a study of the notorious St Louis, Missouri, housing development Pruitt–Igoe. A series of memorial lectures has been founded in his name at CUNY and began in 2017.

Rainwater was the dissertation adviser for Laud Humphreys, the sociologist best known for his work on men who have sex with men in public restrooms (known as tearooms), and for the controversies surrounding the potential ethics involved in the study.
