= The Tearoom =

2017 video game

- itch.io header art
- Developer: Robert Yang
- Composer: The Lonesome Billies
- Platforms: Linux, macOS, Windows
- Release: 28 June 2017
- Mode: Single-player

The Tearoom is a 2017 game by independent developer Robert Yang. Described by the creator as a "historical public bathroom simulator", The Tearoom is an erotic game that simulates the experience of participating in 'tearoom' public sex, also known as cottaging, with the goal of avoiding interference with the police. Taking inspiration from the 1970 non-fiction book Tearoom Trade and a 1962 public sex bust by police in Mansfield, Ohio, Yang developed the game as a political commentary on the past and present traditions of queer sex and persecution of sex by police. Upon release, The Tearoom received attention from publications and academics about the relevance of its historical subject matter and the effectiveness of its gameplay to convey themes of uncertainty and danger.

== Gameplay ==
Eye contact in The Tearoom between the player and other characters is designed to simulate the practices of cottaging.

Set in a Mansfield, Ohio public restroom in 1962, players aim to cruise for sex with men that arrive and leave a public restroom whilst avoiding attention from the police. The player is positioned at a fixed space at a public urinal and can look around to monitor arriving cars and incoming men, or exit the game. As men enter the restroom and use the urinal, players meet their eye contact when they are interested in the player to fill a meter bar reflecting the man's disposition, with the bar depleting when players fail to meet their gaze or stare when they are disinterested. A time limit is displayed representing the time for players to respond. When the bar is filled, the character reveals their 'weapon', which can be stimulated by the player's tongue in a simulation of oral sex by shaking the mouse cursor in target areas on the screen. After this is done several times, the character reaches a climax and leaves, giving players statistics about the type and caliber of weapon. The aim of the game is to collect all eight types of weapons revealed when successfully cruising them, with unlocked weapons being reviewable from within a toilet stall.

Players also must avoid being disrupted by police, who will arrive in a police car seen from a window outside the restroom. They must also avoid undercover police, who will induce the player into sex more quickly and be accompanied by a police car. If the player reaches the stage of getting an undercover policeman to reveal their weapon, more police will enter the restroom. When this occurs, the player's progress of collecting weapons resets to zero. 23% of the men the player interacts with in the game will be undercover police, a reference to a 2015 study by the UCLA which found that 23% of strangers that commit violence against LGBT people are police officers.

== Development ==
Yang was inspired to create The Tearoom as an interpretation and commentary upon historical practices of anonymous and public sex between men, influenced by the 1970 non-fiction book Tearoom Trade by Laud Humphreys. Humphreys' book was a sociological work examining the male subculture of anonymous sex with men in public bathrooms, described as "tearooms" in the United Kingdom or cottages in the United States, seeking to identify the behaviours and motivations of participants through observation. The publication is considered by academics to be a controversial but pivotal study as an early sociological investigation into homosexual behaviors and practices. Observing that Humphreys' approach to his study of imitated the features of game design, Yang integrated the interviews, diagrams and "rules" of tearoom behavior canvassed in Humphreys' study into the game. Yang was also heavily influenced by Tearoom, a 2007 documentary by William E Jones, featuring reconstructed surveillance footage taken from a police sting operation targeting men engaging in public sex in a restroom in Mansfield, Ohio in 1962.

Development of The Tearoom was Yang's most complex project to date, with the game taking 8 to 9 months of "on-and-off" work to complete. Yang, wanting to explore the "intersection of sex and politics", set the demographics of men and police encounter rates to real-world statistics, with the game's racial composition of men reflecting the majority white composition of census statistics for Mansfield, Ohio. In addition, following the decision by streaming services such as Twitch to prohibit the broadcasting of Yang's previous games, Yang substituted the genitals of the characters in The Tearoom with weapons as a commentary on the uneven toleration of violence in contrast to sexual content on online platforms.

== Reception ==
Upon release, The Tearoom received interest from several publications, with some authors expressing amusement at the game, and others commenting on the game's intersection with cultural and historical experiences. Dan Starkey highlighted the game's "anxious undertone" and assessed it as effective of evoking the intended theme of "uncertainty" and "fear about whether or not your most basic identity will be respected or protected". Bruno Dias of Vice wrote that the game was a "perfect meshing of games culture, guns, game sex and gay history", stating that it "weaves all those disparate milieus together into a single thing, showing their shared faultlines of repression, surveillance, public space, and performance". Writing for The Guardian, Jordan Erica Webber noted the game subverted stealth and collection mechanics to reinforce the player's experience of danger and "give (them) something to lose".

The Tearoom has also received academic attention. Harvat examines how the game's design reflects "queer historical engagement" and mediates the "balancing act of pleasure and paranoia", noting that the game pursues positive depictions of queer sex and emphasises "camp, humour and pleasure" whilst taking care not to "romanticize the past and its traumas". Muriel & Crawford discuss how the game simulates the "lives of homosexual men in a time and place where they were being targeted and persecuted", but raises "questions and emotions" about the ongoing status of that persecution today. Discussing The Tearoom in the context of the interplay of "threats and desire", Fowler investigated how Yang's game "simulate(s) the play, desire and risk of cruising", writing that the role of police in the game, and the substitution of guns for genitals, "puts the violent threat against queer life as the centerpiece of the erotic exchange of the game".
