= Luxembourg Income Study =

LIS Cross-National Data Center, formerly known as the Luxembourg Income Study (LIS), is a non-profit organization registered in Luxembourg which produces a cross-national database of micro-economic income data for social science research. The project started in 1983 and is headquartered in Luxembourg. The database includes over 300 datasets from about 50 high- and middle-income countries, with some countries represented for over 30 years. Nationally representative household income survey data is commonly, though not exclusively, provided by the participant country's national statistics collection agency (e.g. Statistics Canada; the Australian Bureau of Statistics). These and other agencies make annual financial contributions which support the database production and maintenance.

The LIS database contains anonymised demographic, income, labour market, and expenditure information at two different levels of analysis (household and persons). The data have, as far as is practical, been transformed to a structure which make different national data equivalent. Data access is only provided for research projects in the social sciences, commercial use is not permitted. For data security reasons the datasets cannot be downloaded or directly accessed. After being granted permission to use the data, users submit SPSS, SAS, R or Stata programs under their username and password to a remote server. The statistical results are automatically returned via email.

Datasets in the database are grouped in intervals referred to as "waves": 1980, 1985, 1990, 1995, 2000, 2004, 2007, 2010, 2013. The LIS data are only suitable for cross-sectional analysis as households cannot be linked over time.

Researchers must agree to publish their papers in the LIS working paper series. This does not preclude other forms of publication. As of 2015, there are over 600 research papers in the series. The data are particularly suitable for cross-national comparisons of poverty and inequality and there are many papers on these topics in the working paper series.

LIS has recently included more middle-income countries. In 2007, a cross-national database on wealth, named 'LWS', became available. It contains data from a subset of the countries participating in the LIS Database.

The LIS website contains registration for data access, dataset contents, self-teaching tutorials, and a working paper series which includes abstracts and full texts.

== History ==
The Luxembourg Income Study was created in 1983 by Americans Timothy Smeeding, an economist, Lee Rainwater, a sociologist, and Luxembourgian Gaston Schaber, a psychologist. Smeeding, Rainwater, and Schaber developed LIS to aggregate household-level income data for the purpose conducting cross-national comparative research across a set of developed countries. Besides the aggregation of international household data, LIS researchers sought to harmonize these data by making income variables and definitions comparable across countries. The initial set of countries featured in the LIS database included Canada, Israel, Germany, Norway, Sweden, the United Kingdom and the United States. The LIS initiative was funded by the Luxembourg government and housed from 1983 to 2002 within the Luxembourgish Centre d'Etudes de Populations, de Pauvreté et de Politiques Socio Economiques. By 2002, the LIS database had expanded to include 30 different countries, during which time the database was also made available online to approved and registered social science researchers through the database's LISSY interface. Smeeding and Rainwater served as LIS's director and research director, respectively; however, both retired between 2005 and 2006 and were succeeded by Janet C. Gornick and Markus Jäntti.

== Countries Participating in LIS ==
=== Africa ===
- Egypt
- South Africa

=== Asia ===
- China
- Japan
- India
- Israel
- Russia
- South Korea
- Taiwan

=== Europe ===
- Austria
- Belgium
- Czech Republic
- Denmark
- Estonia
- Finland
- France
- Georgia
- Germany
- Greece
- Hungary
- Iceland
- Ireland
- Italy
- Luxembourg
- Netherlands
- Norway
- Poland
- Romania
- (Russia, also listed under Asia)
- Serbia
- Slovak Republic
- Slovenia
- Spain
- Sweden
- Switzerland
- United Kingdom

=== North America ===
- Canada
- Dominican Republic
- Guatemala
- Mexico
- Panama
- United States

=== Oceania ===
- Australia

=== South America ===
- Brazil
- Chile
- Colombia
- Paraguay
- Peru
- Uruguay
