= Lula 3D =

2005 video game

- German cover art
- Developer: cdv Software Entertainment
- Publisher: cdv Software Entertainment
- Engine: Vulpine Vision
- Platform: Microsoft Windows
- Release: EU: June 22, 2005; UK: February 10, 2006
- Genres: Erotic, Adventure
- Mode: Single player

Lula 3D is an adult adventure video game developed and published by cdv Software Entertainment for Microsoft Windows. It was released in Europe on June 22, 2005. It is part of the Lula video game series.

The plot centers on Lula, a pornographic actress, who is trying to produce her next porn movie, but must delay her shoot when her female co-stars are kidnapped. The player guides Lula to recover her lost co-stars. The game received negative reviews from critics, who felt that technical problems and low-brow humor removed enjoyment from the game. It is considered one of the worst games of all time.

== Gameplay ==
Lula stands inside a room.

Lula 3D is an adventure game where the player controls Lula, an adult actress who must save her kidnapped co-stars to shoot her next erotic movie. She can be turned using the mouse and moved using the keyboard from a third person perspective, although attempting to move and turn at the same time can sometimes lead the game to crash. The player interacts with the environment by clicking on people and objects in the environment. Lula encounters puzzles throughout the game, and in order to progress through the game's storyline, the player must complete them.

The solutions to the puzzles often have a strange theme. In one puzzle, Lula flashes her dressing accessories to distract a clerk instead of using a more standardized adventure gaming device. The game does not allow the player to progress through the story until they have talked with all characters and clicked on all objects in an area. Lula is often required to perform appropriate acts in order to interact with characters and advance. The player is sometimes required to watch cut-scenes. The scenes sometimes lack detail and during one particular scene, the male hair is missing altogether.

== Plot ==
Three porn star triplets are abducted from Lula's house and she decides to rescue them. After finding her keys, Lula leaves her home in Beverly Hills, California and travels to San Francisco, Las Vegas, and New Orleans to rescue them.

== Development ==
The Lula series was originally developed by German company cdv Software Entertainment in response to the lack of mainstream Western adult video games, and the censorship in games such as the Leisure Suit Larry series. The game's voice acting was originally in German, but was translated for international versions of the game with different voice actors. The developers used motion capture for both action and erotic scenes. The use of motion capture for breast physics was advertised on the game's packaging as "Bouncin' Boobs Technology".

== Reception ==
Reception

Aggregate score
Aggregator	Score
Metacritic	28/100

Review scores
Publication	Score
Adventure Gamers	1.5/5
Eurogamer	2/10
PC Format	55%
PC Gamer (UK)	7%
PC Gamer (US)	38%
PC Zone	31%

Lula 3D holds an aggregate score of 28/100 on Metacritic, indicating "generally unfavorable reviews". Critics panned the game for its technical issues and flat humor, and also panned its reported "Bouncin' Boobs Technology" as being unrealistic and childish for a mature game.

Eurogamer's Ellie Gibson believed that the game's low quality and childish humour made Lula 3D feel like an "erotic" adventure that was developed by and intended for 12-year-old boys and would "make you feel like you've just lost 12 years of your life, and leave you wishing that you had some kind of mind bulimia so you could sick it all up and start again." In particular, she criticized its sub-par translations, poor sound design, and mediocre graphical quality. PC Zone described the game as being "so inexorably, mindbogglingly ignorant of how either real games or real sex works that it spread-eagles itself a fair way into the 'so-bad-it's good' category." The game was considered "oddly compelling" for its quality, which the reviewer compared to "all ten minutes of Michelle from Big Brother decked out in cheap purple underwear staring slack-jawed into the camera on the midnight freeview on Television X." The reviewer felt that if the "Bouncin' Boobs Technology" was realistic, "then I've clearly been talking to the wrong kind of girls for the entirety of my life. (Or at least the more recent bits of my life, in which I've been talking to girls.)"

Just Adventure's Randy Sluganski felt that, although it did not compromise its adult content, Lula 3D had too many glitches and "mediocre" action sequences to be truly enjoyable. Total Video Games's critic Chris Leyton defined the game as "one of the worst titles in recent years". Jolt Online Gaming said the game made "every mistake that can possibly be made by the designers of a 3D adventure", criticizing its poorly implemented controls and camera, tedious gameplay involving "mooching around listening to Lula's terribly voiced and poorly translated descriptions of everything around you, while collecting everything you can lay your hands on", and voice actors whose quality were compared to people auditioning to be a phone sex operator. In conclusion, Jolt felt that "if you like good games, Lula 3D isn't for you. If you like sexual humour, Lula 3D isn't for you. If you have no qualms about pulling yourself off at the sight of dreadfully rendered computer characters shagging, then you need to check yourself in at your local therapy centre."

In 2013, Polygon cited Lula 3D and other "low-brow" pornographic games as a factor in the mainstream video game industry's general non-acceptance of adult video games. In 2017, GamesRadar+ ranked Lula 3D as the 44th worst game of all time, describing it as being "Leisure Suit Larry without any inhibitions whatsoever. Where Larry can't get a girl into bed to save his life, Lula is a pornographic actress, so her adventures cut straight to the bedroom. As such, nudity levels in Lula 3D are sky high, but the game's lack of fun is rivalled only by its lack of respectable clothing."

== See also ==
- List of video games notable for negative reception
