= Stick Shift (video game) =

2015 video game

- itch.io version cover
- Developer(s): Robert Yang
- Platform(s): Linux, macOS, Windows
- Release: 3 April 2015
- Mode(s): Single-player

Stick Shift is a 2015 video game by independent developer Robert Yang. Described by Yang as "an autoerotic night-driving game", the game is an erotic video game and art game in which players "pleasure a gay car". Created following the development of games featuring more "uncanny" characters, Yang aimed to create a game that explored eroticism through the facial expressions of a player character, using the "humorously masculine" innuendo of manual driving as a metaphor. Upon release, Stick Shift received positive attention, with some critics expressing amuseument and bewilderment at the game's absurd and erotic concept, and others praising the game's uniqueness, with several drawing comparisons to the themes of the J.G. Ballard novel Crash.

== Gameplay ==
Players manipulate the stick shift (right), prompting facial reactions from the player character (left).

Stick Shift is a short game in which players use the mouse to vertically stroke a stick shift to increase the speed of a car. Gear changes, made by clicking and dragging the mouse cursor, must be increased slowly when the car reaches a certain speed as depicted on the speedometer to ensure the car does not stall too early. The gameplay is depicted in split screen between a close-up of the player as the driver on the left side, whose facial expressions increase in intensity with the speed and gear of the car, and the manipulation of the stick shift on the right side. Upon reaching the maximum gear, the player either reaches an ecstatic climax with the car, or is stopped by police, with a 51 and 49 per cent chance of occurring per session. In the aftermath, a countdown timer is depicted, preventing the player from replaying the game until they recover from their experience - or escape their legal troubles.

== Development ==
Stick Shift was intended by Yang to "expand eroticism in games" by exploring the indirect representation of sexual experiences through emotion, facial expression and metaphor. This approach was inspired by the 1964 Andy Warhol experimental film, Blow Job, in which an experience of arousal is implied in a close-up of a man's face. Yang's previous games, including Hurt Me Plenty and Succulent, had concealed the faces of their character models to avoid the uncanny valley, which he wanted to subvert to explore a more human sense of arousal.

The use of manual driving was used by Yang as a metaphor for arousal and climax. Yang expressed that this theme subverted the "humorously masculine" nature of car culture and the tactile "intimacy" of car ownership, including the "phallic" design of stick shifts. Yang reused the code of his previous game, Hurt Me Plenty, to introduce a "cooldown period" before the game could be replayed, to reinforce the acts in the game as a "felt" experience as a virtual "refractory period". In half of player experiences, the game will end with the player being stopped by police officers. Yang cited that this ending was intended to represent the arbitrary nature of police misconduct and the specific tensions in interactions between police and members of the LGBT community, historically reflected in events including the Stonewall Riots.

== Reception ==
Reception of Stick Shift was positive, with many critics responding to the erotic and absurd content of the game with amusement and bewilderment. In a review of the game and discussion of Yang's artist statement, Chris Priestman praised the game's "technosexual concept" as "ridiculous" and "affirming", comparing its depiction of "human and machine" erotica as a timely interpretation of the themes in the J.G. Ballard novel Crash. Describing the game as "absurd" and "humorous", Nathan Grayson of Kotaku noted the game had merit in its short length and able to effectively "communicate thoughts and feelings entire novels cannot". Alice O'Connor of Rock Paper Shotgun similarly described the game as "silly and funny", praising the game's innate absurdity and its ability to balance "issues of representation and expression with cultural and political underpinnings" whilst still being "fun and funny". Citing the game as one of the best free PC games as of 2023, PC Gamer stated the game was "funny while also offering food for thought".
