= Sven Bømwøllen =

2002 video game

- Developer: Phenomedia
- Publishers: ak tronic Software & Services GmbH
- Platform: Microsoft Windows
- Release: February 18, 2002
- Genre: Arcade video game
- Mode: Single-player

Sven Bømwøllen is a video game developed by Phenomedia and published by ak tronic Software & Services GmbH for Microsoft Windows. Released in 2002, it is the first instalment of a series of humorous German games, all concerning the sexual behaviour of the titular character, a black sheep named Sven Bømwøllen.

== Gameplay ==
In Sven Bømwøllen, the player controls Sven, a black sheep, with a task to mate with all the white sheep around. Sven is directed by a keyboard, with a special key that initiates the sexual intercourse. The female white sheep are entirely passive most of the time and await Sven's attention. Their current happiness status is shown by a weather symbol above their head. The more female sheep wait around for their needs to be satisfied, the more their symbols shift towards a lightning. At that point, they start to get angry and become red with horns, which makes them run around the field. They may electrocute Sven, which, in itself, merely causes a loss of points, but will also paralyze him for a short time. Before they turn red, Sven can whistle to them to cheer them up. After reaching a state of maximum happiness (symbolized by a heart), they will disappear, resulting in points being awarded to the player. To clear a level, Sven must make all the white sheep disappear.

There are two enemies whom Sven has to avoid: a shepherd Lars Einnicken and his dog Wøtan. The players can always avoid the two by jumping into a pond or puddle, which will not cost a life, but results in Sven reappearing elsewhere on the screen. Sven can pick up extras in the form of flowers and mushrooms to gain special powers. At the beginning, he has three lives in total, which can be increased by collecting power-ups. A fish sheep may jump out of the water; if Sven makes her happy, the player receives extra points. Occasionally, an alien UFO will appear and try to capture sheep with a beam. The game is set in a Scandinavian-inspired environment.

== Sequels ==
Following the release of Sven Bømwøllen, several sequels have been developed. In 2003, Sven II appeared with different and larger levels, offering new animals such as pigs and chickens as Sven's potential love interests. A year later, two new entries in the series have been released: Sven XXX and Sven 004. Sven XXX added multiplayer and bonus levels where the player takes over an alien or Lars. Sven 004 introduced levels spanning multiple screens, new enemies such as the short-sighted hunters, cars that Sven needs to avoid when crossing a road, and a lawnmower he can use as transport. Released in 2005, a spinoff titled Sven Kommt is a departure from the other games, because it now plays as a platformer while replacing the 2D sprites with 3D characters and scenery. A new sequel named Sven - Completely Screwed (German: Sven - Durchgeknallt) was released in 2023
