= Lula: The Sexy Empire =

1998 video game

- British cover art
- Developer(s): Interactive Strip, cdv
- Publisher(s): Take-Two Interactive
- Designer(s): Carsten Korte, Carsten Wieland
- Series: Lula series
- Platform(s): Windows, AmigaOS
- Release: EU: 1998
- Genre(s): Business simulation game
- Mode(s): Single-player

Lula: The Sexy Empire (also known as Wet: The Sexy Empire) is a business simulation game for Windows and AmigaOS. The game revolves around building a multimillion-dollar pornography and erotica industry. Character designs were done by German comic artist Carsten Wieland.

== See also ==
- Lula games
