= Sex Olympics =

1991 erotic point-and-click adventure game by Free Spirit Software

- Amiga box art
- Developer: Free Spirit Software
- Publisher: Free Spirit Software
- Platforms: Amiga, Atari ST, MS-DOS
- Release: Amiga: EU: April 1991
- Genre: Adventure
- Mode: Single-player

Sex Olympics, alternatively titled Brad Stallion in Sex Olympics is an erotic point-and-click adventure game developed and published by Free Spirit Software for MS-DOS, Atari ST, and Amiga. The Amiga version was released in Europe in April 1991. Sex Olympics is the finale of the Brad Stallion series, and is preceded by Sex Vixens from Space (1988), Planet of Lust (1989), and Bride of the Robot (1989). The game was panned by reviewers.

== Plot ==
Doctor Dildo has entered the eponymous Sex Olympics to further his plans of world domination, and Headquarters has assigned Brad Stallion, government agent and captain of the phallic spaceship the Big Thruster, to compete against him. Over the course of the Sex Olympics, both Dr. Dildo and Brad Stallion seek to have sex with as many women as possible. Brad Stallion must visit several different planets to accomplish this.

== Gameplay ==
Sex Olympics includes digitized nudity.

Sex Olympics has controls comparable to other point-and-click adventures such as the ability to move up, down, left and right, which are context-sensitive to the player's location, as well as commands to take, drop, touch, give, use, go, look, and talk to NPCs. Sex Olympics also has more 'obscene' inputs such as kiss, eat, 'screw' and 'jack off'. Some UI options include the ability to review recent text, and exit the game. The player's goal in Sex Olympics is to have sex with as many women as possible out of the nine women on different planets, and to do so faster than Dr. Dildo. The player must solve puzzles to accomplish this, e.g. to have sex with the Ice Princess, the player must find a "thermo schlong warmer", or they freeze to death.

Sex Olympics has three difficulty settings: Easy, Medium, and Hard. The selected difficulty determines aspects of gameplay: On Easy difficulty, the player can have sex with women that Dr. Dildo has already lain with, and Dr. Dildo is unable to have sex with women that have been with the player. On Medium difficulty, Dr. Dildo is able to have sex with women that have been with the player, and on Hard difficulty, the same is true, although the player cannot have sex with women that have been with Dr. Dildo.

In the Amiga version, a prompt requiring a key word from the manual to be entered precedes the title screen; however, this form of copy protection is not enforced, and entering any word or simply hitting the enter key bypasses the screen. Also exclusive to the Amiga version, a transcript of the game's text can be sent to a printer: this feature is absent in the DOS and Atari ST versions. The solutions to puzzles, as well as the locations of items and clues in-game, are changed each time the game is played.

== Development ==
Sex Olympics has a glitch wherein the copy protection prompt asks for a word from page six of the manual, although the manual is four pages long.

== Reception ==
Reception

Review scores
Publication	Score
Datormagazin	21% (Amiga)
Amiga Joker	6% (Amiga)

Swedish gaming magazine Datormagazin gave the Amiga version of Sex Olympics an overall score of 21%, stating that "This game is, despite the name, hardly more heated than games in the public domain. The 'sex' shown in the game is limited to half-shitty digitized naked breasts." Datormagazin expresses that they "really hope Sex Olympics was meant as a joke, as it is very seriously that really, really bad." Datormagazin further criticises Sex Olympics' graphics, stating that they "may have been considered decent in 1982", and criticises the sound effects as just "thumping and plop sounds", and further calls Sex Olympics "a really shitty game, in other words."

German gaming magazine Amiga Joker gave the Amiga version of Sex Olympics an overall score of 6%, stating that "we have unanimously chosen the story as the 'stupidest plot of all time' ... If you were to wager that [Sex Olympics] would eventually get better, you would have no idea how wrong you were." Amiga Joker criticizes Sex Olympics' sound, calling its title screen music "pathetic", its digitized speech "atrocious", and its sound effects "miserable". Amiga Joker expresses that "If there was anything that could be remotely considered interesting in this game, it would be the graphics - which barely reach the level of public domain games." Amiga Joker further criticizes Sex Olympics' overall presentation, speculating that "this game was created to drum up sales for its similarly terrible predecessors"; they further express that playing the game 'feels like a chore', stating that "The 'New Game' icon appears with such regularity that it feels like a sign of an easier fate [than continuing to play the game]."

QuestBusters reviewed the Amiga version of Sex Olympics in a July 1991 issue, expressing that they "wouldn't go so far as to say that Sex Olympics is a good game, but compared to the earlier Stallion adventures, Sex Olympics is substantially improved." QuestBusters praised Sex Olympics easier & improved puzzles in that they 'actually make sense', as well as the game's minimal opportunities for a game over, expressing that "Earlier adventures in the series tended to kill you and make you restart from your last save when you made mistakes, but Sex Olympics is much more forgiving." QuestBusters praised Sex Olympics' "significantly improved" graphics, calling the game's digitized nudity "truly excellent", and praised the game's occasional animation.
