= Planet of Lust =

1989 video game

- Atari ST box art
- Developer: Free Spirit Software
- Publisher: Free Spirit Software
- Director: Joe Hubbard
- Programmers: Warren Long, Vern Seabrook, Vern Gerein (Atari ST)
- Artists: SKP Graphics; Tomisa Starr
- Writer: John R. Olsen Jr.
- Composer: Roger Harris
- Platforms: DOS, Atari ST, Amiga
- Release: 1989; Amiga: EU: April 1989
- Genre: Interactive fiction
- Mode: Single-player

Planet of Lust is a 1989 erotic text adventure game developed and self-published by Free Spirit Software, and released for Commodore 64, DOS, Atari ST, and Amiga. The Amiga version of Planet of Lust was released in Europe in April 1989. Planet of Lust is the second game in the Brad Stallion series; it is preceded by Sex Vixens from Space (1988), and succeeded by Bride of the Robot (1989) and Sex Olympics (1991).

== Plot ==
Doctor Dildo has captured the pleasure planet Erotica in a force field and holds it for ransom, demanding that the Federated Government hand over the ultimate weapon, the Mind Imprinter, or the planet of Erotica will be crushed. Brad Stallion, freelance government agent and captain of the phallic spaceship the Big Thruster, has been hired by the Federated Government to capture Dr. Dildo and deactivate the force field before the planet is destroyed.

== Gameplay ==
While the majority of inputs in Planet of Lust are inputted through text commands, objects and characters may be interacted with using the mouse in the style of a point-and-click adventure. The player may move in the cardinal directions using the arrow keys, and certain UI elements may be accessed through shortcut keys. 'I' may be inputted to access the inventory, 'L' for information on current location, and 'S' for game status; the Big Thruster's computer AI Sandie gives advice pertinent to the player's location and situation.

Planet of Lust has a built-in option to send a transcript of the game's text to a printer.

Planet of Lust's graphics received mixed reviews from critics.

== Development ==
Planet of Lust was first announced around August 1989. The Amiga version of Planet of Lust was released in Europe in April 1989. The Amiga version of Planet of Lust cost US$39.95 in 1989. Planet of Lust was exhibited at the World of Commodore expo in 1989.

== Reception ==
Reception

Review scores
| Publication | Score |
|---|---|
| .info | 3.5/5 (Amiga) |
| Antic's Amiga Plus | 2/5 (Amiga) |
| Amiga Joker | 31% (Amiga) |

Antic's Amiga Plus gave the Amiga version of Planet of Lust an overall score of 2 out of five stars, criticizing the game's graphics as "[looking] like they were imported from an 8-bit machine" as well as the 'underwhelming' amount of sexual content, expressing that "while there is supposed to be an erotic feeling to the game it is nothing to get excited about. The graphics of naked women and softcore nature might titillate only the sexually desperate". Amiga Plus expressed that they were underwhelmed by Planet of Lust's 'almost interesting' gameplay, stating that it might have at best "a few interesting puzzles and a chuckle or two."

German gaming magazine Amiga Joker gave the Amiga version of Planet of Lust an overall score of 31%, beginning their review by expressing that "It's hard to believe, but Planet of Lust manages to undercut its predecessor: the confusingly similar packaging once more contains two disks, and the quality of the graphics is certainly inconsistent - and they're good for almost nothing!" Amiga Joker compared Planet of Lust's controls to that of adventure games by Mindscape, but criticized the game's parser, music, and 'monotonous' gameplay, stating that "[the] parser understands maybe ten words. You go from room to room, you try not to let the music put you to sleep, and other than that you wait for a naked woman to eventually appear onscreen." Amiga Joker criticized Planet of Lust's 'underwhelming' sexual content, expressing that "If you manage to get that far, you'll be disappointed: a glimpse of the actual Playboy title screen is the only excitement you'll get. The game promises sexual intrigue, but then it offers nothing - it's one to forget!"

.info gave the Amiga version of Planet of Lust an overall score of 3.5 stars out of 5, calling it an improvement over its predecessor Sex Vixens from Space, and praised the game's "colorful cartoonesque" graphics and "smutty" & "humorous" text. .info criticized Planet of Lust's "somewhat stilted" parser, but expressed that it was an improvement over that of Sex Vixens from Space.
