= Laud Humphreys =

American sociologist (1930–1988)

The Reverend Laud Humphreys
- Born: Robert Allan Humphreys; October 16, 1930; Chickasha, Oklahoma, US
- Died: August 23, 1988 (aged 57); Los Angeles, California, US
- Education: Colorado College | Seabury-Western Theological Seminary | Washington University in St. Louis
- Occupations: Sociologist; priest; psychotherapist
- Employer: Southern Illinois University | State University of New York at Albany | Pitzer College
- Notable work: Tearoom Trade (1970)
- Spouse: Nancy Wallace (m. 1960; sep. 1980)
- Partner: Brian Miller (1980–1988)

Ecclesiastical career
- Religion: Christianity (Anglican)
- Church: Episcopal Church
- Ordained: 1955 (priest)

Robert Allan Humphreys (1930–1988), known as Laud Humphreys, was an American sociologist and Episcopal priest. He is noted for his research into sexual encounters between men in public bathrooms, published as Tearoom Trade (1970), and for the questions that emerged regarding the ethical nature of his research methods. He influenced generations of scholars who research issues related to sexuality and sexual identity.

== Biography ==
Robert Allan Humphreys was born on October 16, 1930, in Chickasha, Oklahoma, to Ira Denver Humphreys and Stella Bernice Humphreys. "Laud" was chosen as his first name when he was baptized again upon entering the Episcopal Church.

=== Education ===
Humphreys graduated from Chickasha High School (Chickasha, Oklahoma) in 1948. He then attended Colorado College, graduating with his BA in 1952. He attended Seabury-Western Theological Seminary (in Evanston, Illinois), graduating with the MDiv degree in 1955. In 1965, he entered graduate school at Washington University to pursue a PhD in sociology. His dissertation adviser was Lee Rainwater. Humphreys obtained two pre-doctoral research fellowships from the National Institute of Mental Health to fund his dissertation research. He completed his dissertation in 1968, graduating with his PhD in that year. He published the dissertation as Tearoom Trade: Impersonal Sex in Public Places in 1970. His book won the C. Wright Mills Award from the Society for the Study of Social Problems in 1969. Due to the controversy around his research methods and the topic of his research, there was a failed attempt by the chancellor of Washington University to rescind his PhD.

=== Career ===
After earning his MDiv, and before returning for his PhD, Humphreys was ordained as an Episcopal priest. He served in a number of parishes and advocated for the Civil Rights Movement, which put him in tension with a number of the parishes in which he served.

In 1965, Humphreys returned to study for a PhD which he earned in 1968. Afterwards, Humphreys was an assistant professor of sociology at Southern Illinois University in Edwardsville, Illinois, from 1968 to 1970. He was associate professor of sociology at the School of Criminal Justice, State University of New York in Albany from 1970 to 1972. He was associate professor of sociology at Pitzer College, in Claremont, California, from 1972 to 1975; he earned full professorship at Pitzer in 1975, where he worked until about 1980, when he began to focus on his psychotherapist practice. However, he did not retire from Pitzer until 1986, two years before his death.

Humphreys belonged to several sociological professional organizations, including the American Sociological Association (ASA), the Society for the Study of Social Problems, the Pacific Sociological Association, and the Academy of Criminal Justice Sciences. He was a charter member of the International Academy of Sex Research. During his academic career, he served on a number of editorial boards and served as chair of multiple professional society committees. He was an invited speaker at more than a dozen symposia and other events, and was a guest on four TV shows.

=== Personal life ===
Humphreys married Nancy Wallace, a woman from a prominent Tulsa family, in 1960. The couple had two children, Claire and David. In 1974, Humphreys came out as a gay man during a discussion at a conference session at the ASA. Humphreys was a co-founder of the Sociologists' Gay Caucus (now the Committee on the Status of Lesbian, Gay, Bisexual, Transgender, and Queer People in Sociology), established in 1974 as a response to a presentation by Edward Sagarin that criticized homosexual sociologists as hiding in the closet.

Humphreys separated from his wife in 1980 and began living with Brian Miller, a graduate student at the University of Alberta. With Miller, he co-authored articles about gay subcultures and victims of violent homophobia.

Humphreys died of lung cancer on August 23, 1988, aged 57.

=== Biography and papers ===
His biography, written by John F. Galliher, Wayne H. Brekhus, and David P. Keys, was published in 2004, under the title Laud Humphreys: Prophet of Homosexuality and Sociology. The authors establish the case that Humphreys was an extremely complex person and that he was professionally marginalized in the discipline of sociology. The book also heralds his contributions to the discipline of sociology, as well as his advocacy for African-American civil rights, gay rights, and against war.

The University of Southern California houses the Laud Humphreys Papers Collection, as part of the ONE National Gay & Lesbian Archives.

== Tearoom Trade ==
Humphreys is best known for his published PhD dissertation, Tearoom Trade: Impersonal Sex in Public Places (1970), an ethnographic study of anonymous male-male sexual encounters in public toilets (a practice known as "tea-rooming" in US gay slang and "cottaging" in British English). Humphreys asserted that the men participating in such activity came from diverse social backgrounds, had differing personal motives for seeking sexual partners in such venues, and variously self-perceived as "straight," "bisexual," or "gay." Because Humphreys was able to confirm that over 50% of his subjects identified as heterosexual men who were married to women, a primary thesis of Tearoom Trade is the incongruence between the private self and the social self for many of the men engaging in this form of homosexual activity. Specifically, they put on a "breastplate of righteousness" (social and political conservatism) in an effort to conceal their sexual behavior and prevent being exposed as deviants. Humphreys tapped into a theme of incongruence between one's words and deeds that has become a primary methodological and theoretical concern in sociology throughout the 20th and 21st centuries.

Humphreys' study has been criticized by sociologists and other social and behavioral scientists on ethical grounds in that he observed sexual acts by masquerading as a voyeur, "did not get his subjects’ consent, tracked down names and addresses through license plate numbers, and interviewed the men in their homes in disguise and under false pretenses."

According to Jack Nusan Porter, a sociologist who knew Humphreys and studied under Howard S. Becker at Northwestern University from 1967 to 1971, "Humphreys was enormously influential on graduate students and younger scholars in the field of deviance, ethnography, and what we called 'participant observation'. True, today one could not do such research because there was no 'informed consent' but then again, in many cases, when doing research on deviant behavior, one will never get 'informed consent' so we miss out on a lot of important findings. He was a true pioneer and a hero to all of us in these fields."

Humphreys' research materials, including detailed diagrams and maps of tearoom activity he observed, are housed in the collections at ONE National Gay & Lesbian Archives.

By 2004, Tearoom Trade had sold more than 300,000 copies. Steven P. Schacht notes that this fact "makes it one of the best selling books ever written by a sociologist." The book was also published by Gerald Duckworth & Co. in British English, and in German by Ferdinand Enke Vertag. Both of these versions were published in 1974.

== Humphreys' influence ==
Humphreys influenced generations of sociologists and other social and behavioral scientists in complex ways. He is often studied in research methods classes for the ethical questions that his works raised. However, Earl Babbie, who writes about sociological research methods, notes that the controversy about "sociological snoopers" and research ethics was likely the result of societal homophobia and disgust with the research topic, and not due to real problems with research methods.

Schacht credits Humphreys with pioneering research on impersonal sex, now a common topic of research and advocacy in the context of HIV/AIDS. Tewksbury writes about the multiple studies that were inspired by Humphrey's work, calling his work a rich legacy for future sex researchers. According to Brekhus, Humphrey's contribution to sociological theory, in particular to the development of the concept of identity politics, is often overlooked, but should be hailed as an important forerunner to modern queer theory. Nardi also lauds Humphreys' theoretical work, especially his concept of the breastplate of righteousness. Humphreys developed this idea to explain the apparent contradiction of presumably straight, married men holding a public conservative stance against homosexuality, yet engaging in impersonal sex with men in public settings.

In 2003, the presidential session at the Society for the Study of Social Problems (SSSP) was devoted to honoring Humphrey's pioneering work on sexuality. In 2004, a special issue of The International Journal of Sociology and Social Policy was published that was edited by Steven P. Schacht, who participated in the SSSP session. The special issue contained ten articles analyzing his research and his multiple contributions as a social activist and scholar. The authors of these articles call for sociologists and others to move beyond criticism of Humphrey's research methodologies in the tearoom study, and instead to focus on his pioneering contributions to the study of sexuality, participant-observation as method, development of sociological theory, and his work as a social activist and advocate for marginalized sexual identities.

== Works published ==
=== Books ===
- Humphreys, Laud (1970), "Tearoom trade : impersonal sex in public places", Beiträge zur Sexualforschung, vol. 54, Duckworth, pp. 1–138, ISBN 978-0-7156-0551-6, OCLC 12118038, PMID 4466485
- Humphreys, Laud (1972), Out of the closets; the sociology of homosexual liberation, A Spectrum book, S-288, Englewood Cliffs, N.J., Prentice-Hall, ISBN 978-0-13-645317-8, OCLC 357093

=== Journal articles and book chapters ===
- Humphreys, Laud. (1970). "Impersonal sex in public places." Transaction, January, 1970: 10–25.
- Humphreys, Laud. (1971). "New styles in homosexual manliness." Transaction, March/April 1971: 38–46, 64–65.
- Humphreys, Laud. (1974). "Homosexual exchanges in public places." pp. 129–142 in L. Rainwater (ed.), Social problems and public policy: Deviance and liberty. Hawthorne, NY: Aldine.
- Humphreys, Laud. (1975). "Predicting the unpredictable: Some crime prospects for the decade." The Participant, Winter.
- Humphreys, Laud. (1978). "An interview with Evelyn Hooker." Alternative lifestyles: Changing patterns in marriage, family, & intimacy, Vol. 1, No. 2.
- Humphreys, Laud. (1979). "Being odd against all odds." pp. 238–242 in R. Fedarico (ed.), Sociology (2nd edition). Reading, MA: Addison-Wesley.
- Humphreys, Laud. (1979). "Exodus and identity: The emerging gay culture." pp. 134–147 in M. Levine (ed.), Gay men: The sociology of male homosexuality. New York: Harper and Row.
- Humphreys, Laud. (1980). "Homosexuality in perspective." Society 17(6): 84–86.
- Humphreys, Laud; Miller, Brian. (1980). "Keeping in touch: Maintaining contact with stigmatized subjects." pp. 212–223 in W. Shaffir, R. Stebbins, and A. Turowetz (eds.), Field Work Experience: Qualitative Approaches to Social Research. New York: St. Martin's Press.
- Miller, Brian; Humphreys, Laud. (1980). "Lifestyles and violence: Homosexual victims of assault and murder." Qualitative Sociology 3(3): 169–185.
- Goodwin, Glenn A; Humphreys, Laud. (1982). "Freeze-Dried Stigma: Cybernetics and Social Control." Humanity & Society 6(4): 391–408.

== Sources ==
- Nardi, Peter M (1995), ""The Breastplate of Righteousness": Twenty-Five Years After Laud Humphreys' Tearoom Trade: Impersonal Sex in Public Places", Journal of Homosexuality, 30 (2): 1–10, doi:10.1300/j082v30n02_01, ISSN 0091-8369, OCLC 196108769, PMID 8698998
