= Sex Vixens from Space =

1988 video game

- Amiga box art
- Developer: Free Spirit Software
- Publishers: Free Spirit Software; ASoft (Europe)
- Director: Joe Hubbard (Amiga)
- Designer: Dana M. Dominiak (Amiga)
- Programmer: Mark Brannon (Amiga)
- Artists: Light Systems (Amiga); Robert J. Dominiak (Amiga> Greg Vickers (Amiga)
- Writers: Lance Strate (C64, Apple II); John R. Olsen Jr. (Amiga)
- Platforms: Amiga, Atari ST, Commodore 64, DOS, Apple II
- Release: 1988
- Genres: Interactive fiction (C64); Graphic adventure
- Mode: Single-player

Sex Vixens from Space is an erotic interactive fiction game developed and self-published by Free Spirit Software and originally released in 1988 for the Commodore 64 and Apple II as part of the compilation Sex And Violence Vol. 1. It was released as a standalone game, with the addition of graphics, in November 1988 for DOS and Amiga and in 1989 for the Atari ST. Sex Vixens was inspired by the 1974 sexploitation film Flesh Gordon. The game was panned by reviewers.

The game was planned for release in the United Kingdom, but a shipment of copies were seized by British Customs in 1989 and subsequently destroyed.

Sex Vixens from Space is the first entry in the Brad Stallion series, and was followed by Planet of Lust (1989), Bride of the Robot (1989), and Sex Olympics (1991).

== Plot ==
Brad Stallion, freelance government agent and captain of the phallic spaceship the Big Thruster, has been hired by the Federated Government to neutralize "The Tribe", a colony of cloned hypersexual amazon women that raid planets to castrate men using their sex-ray gun. Brad Stallion is tasked with travelling to their home planet of Mondo, and destroying the sex-ray gun.

== Gameplay ==
The sexual content was considered underwhelming by some reviewers.

The Commodore 64 version of Sex Vixens from Space is purely a text adventure, with no graphics or alternate controls.

While most actions in the DOS, Atari ST, and Amiga ports of Sex Vixens from Space are still entered via text commands, alongside the addition of graphics, objects and characters may be interacted with using the mouse in the style of a point-and-click adventure; this is absent in the Commodore 64 version. The player may move in the cardinal directions using the arrow keys, and certain UI elements may be accessed through shortcut keys. 'I' may be inputted to access the inventory, 'L' for information on current location, and 'S' for game status; the Big Thruster's computer AI Sandie gives advice pertinent to the player's location and situation.

== Development ==
Sex Vixens from Space was originally released in 1988 on the Commodore 64 and Apple II as part of the game compilation Sex And Violence Vol. 1, alongside Bite of the Sorority Vampires and Hatchet Honeymoon. Sex And Violence Vol. 1 cost $29.95 USD in 1988.

The Amiga version of Sex Vixens from Space cost 'around 85' Deutschmark in 1988, and $39.95 USD in 1989. Alongside the real credits, there are several fake names with fake roles for comedic effect. The Commodore 64 and Apple II versions of Sex Vixens from Space are credited to Lance Strate, although it is unclear whether this is a real person, as the other two games in Sex And Violence Vol. 1, Bite of the Sorority Vampires and Hatchet Honeymoon, are credited to 'Dick Long' and 'Peter Grow' respectively. Other ports of Sex Vixens from Space had a larger development team. Sex Vixens from Space was published by ASoft in Europe. While the Amiga and DOS versions of Sex Vixens support the use of a second disk drive to run both game disks at once, the Atari ST version is incompatible with using both disks at once, thus the disks must be swapped out as needed. Sex Vixens from Space was exhibited at the World of Commodore expo in 1989. A patched release of the Amiga version of Sex Vixens was released around October 1989.

In the UK in 1989, a shipment of copies of the Amiga version of Sex Vixens from Space were seized by British Customs and subsequently destroyed due to their sexual content; while other publications did not specify a number, .info stated that 75 copies were destroyed. Joe Hubbard from Free Spirit Software defended Sex Vixens' sexual content in a statement to The Australian Commodore and Amiga Review, stating that "While Sex Vixens from Space may be a bit racy, it is not pornographic. Apparently, the British authorities are either quite prudish or completely lacking a sense of humor. Regardless, freedom of artistic expression and the freedom to disseminate such are cornerstones of democracy. The act of seizing these game [sic] is the act of a fascist government." Tim Harris, the CEO of ASoft, Sex Vixens' European publisher, said in a statement to Your Sinclair that "The game's been hyped up, but there isn't really that much sexual content. It's a heck of a lot tamer than Strip Poker."

In an interview with Italian gaming magazine Amiga Magazine, the president of Free Spirit Software, Joseph Hubbard, expressed that Sex Vixens from Space was inspired by the 1974 sexploitation film Flesh Gordon, stating that "When we made Sex Vixens, we thought of an old soft-core movie called Flesh Gordon ... It gave the public some eroticism and a lot of fun, although not necessarily in that order." When asked about the moral impact of sexual computer games, Hubbard expressed that "Everyone has some fantasy, and there's nothing wrong with that. A computer cannot do more damage than what an individual can already do on their own. I prefer to see people play with erotic software rather than violent games." Hubbard further expressed that "Anyone can sit at their computer and exterminate hundreds of aliens, or human beings in enemy uniforms ... Do you think this is healthier or less dangerous than sex?"

== Reception ==
Reception

Review scores
Publication	Score
.info	2.5/5 (Amiga)
Aktueller Software Markt	3.2/12 (Amiga)
Datormagazin	2/10 (Amiga)

In a June 1990 issue of STart magazine, the plot of Sex Vixens from Space was given as an example of sexism in the gaming industry and objectification of women in media. In 1996, Computer Gaming World declared Sex Vixens from Space the 19th-worst computer game ever released, stating that "This funny, sexy adventure game was neither funny, sexy nor adventurous."

German gaming magazine Aktueller Software Markt gave the Amiga version of Sex Vixens from Space an overall score of 3.2 out of 12, summarizing it as a "soft porno computer game" and calling the game's sexual content 'more tame' than what the cover or advertisements suggest. ASM criticized Sex Vixens from Space's graphics and text input, expressing that "If you're hoping for crisp graphics, you'll be disappointed. What is also disappointing is the adventure, specifically the core elements that determine the quality of the adventure. The parser should be red in the face should you flatter it by describing it as such. The graphics are thoroughly low quality, and the title screen is an absolute catastrophe: for this alone Free Spirit Software should be ashamed until the end of their days." ASM also criticized Sex Vixens' plot as "stupid", as well as its 'disappointing' amount of sexual content, stating that "there is too little sex for a computer-porno, not enough processing power for a proper adventure, and too much money for both. Overall, the game's forgettable!"

.info gave the Amiga version of Sex Vixens from Space an overall score of 2.5 stars out of 5, beginning their review by lamenting the game's glitches, expressing that "I wanted to like this game, and I know I would if it worked", but praised the game's adult content, stating that "The adults-only adventure game premise has been tried before, and this one comes very close to succeeding." .info further criticized Sex Vixens' glitches, expressing that "all the effort has gone into the graphics and story rather than the programming", particularly criticizing the game's parser and text input, noting the 'limited' commands and stating that the game has abrupt lag spikes in which both the game and the parser are unresponsive. .info praised Sex Vixens' humor and "quite well done" graphics, but expressed that the game needed to be patched by the developers, concluding that "I hope Free Spirit will do the necessary fixes, because Sex Vixens has all the potential to become a deliciously funny and entertaining game."

Swedish gaming magazine Datormagazin gave the Amiga version of Sex Vixens from Space an overall score of 2 out of 10, bluntly captioning their review by stating that "Sex Vixens from Space is a piece of shit. Apparently it's broken too, and not even so-bad-it's-funny." Datormagazin criticizes the game's plot as "tasteless" and furthermore calls Sex Vixens "a game which is so bad that you wonder why it even exists". Datormagazin praised Sex Vixens' "very well made" graphics, but expressed that they didn't make up for the game's shortcomings, stating that "what good will good graphics do if the rest of the game is pure shit?" Datormagazin criticized the lack of a save feature, expressing that it "characterizes the game's terrible quality well", and noted a glitch where if the player drops an item after picking it up for the first time, it may no longer be picked up. Datormagazin concluded their review by expressing that "[Sex Vixens] can be summarized in a single word: Avoid!"

QuestBusters reviewed the Amiga version of the game in a September 1989 issue, criticizing the game's "inconsistent" interface & inputs, and "far below average" parser. QuestBusters noted Sex Vixens' possible inputs as 'limited', stating that "In most situations, the program won't even let you examine much of the surroundings" and expressed that this limited the game's puzzles, saying that "There aren't a lot of logical puzzles, since the parser won't even let you examine most items, let alone use them. Basically, all you can do is "make love" or "talk" to the women". QuestBusters further criticized the impact of Sex Vixens' limited inputs with regards to puzzles, expressing that "There's only one solution for each puzzle, and with such a limited vocabulary, you can fall into the trap of knowing the answer but get stuck trying to guess what synonym the game wants to hear." QuestBusters praised Sex Vixens futuristic graphics as "slick and colorful", but criticized the 'bad' quality of the art of women in-game, stating that "Not only are the majority of the women ugly, but the actual drawings are drastically inferior to that of the space ships". QuestBusters furthermore criticized Sex Vixens minimal on-screen interaction with NPCs, expressing that "While most of these graphics [are of] professional quality, there are no people in 99% of them. This creates, oddly enough for a sex-oriented game, a sterile environment." QuestBusters criticized Sex Vixens' nudity as 'ugly and unappealing', and further expressed that the game's "limited" erotic text was similarly unattractive. QuestBusters condemned the lack of a save feature as 'unreasonable' for a modern adventure game, and also criticized the lack of music and sound effects.

Italian gaming magazine Game Republic noted Sex Vixens from Space as an oddity in a 2013 retrospective review, praising its "interesting narrative" but noted it as being "undeniably in poor taste" at times. Game Republic praised Sex Vixens from Space's "bizarre" environments and over-the-top presentation, calling it "a space opera as absurd as it is surprising".

== See also ==
- Leather Goddesses of Phobos
