= Sex with Stalin =

2020 video game

- Developer: Mova Games
- Director: Georgiy Kukhtenkov
- Engine: Windows, macOS
- Release: 26 October 2020
- Genre: Dating simulator
- Mode: Single-player

Sex with Stalin is a 2020 satirical dating sim video game developed by Georgiy Kukhtenkov, also known as "Boobs Dev". In Sex with Stalin, the player character, a contemporary Russian, travels back in time and has several sexually charged conversations with former Soviet leader Joseph Stalin. In addition to being a parody of dating simulators, the game also functions as a critique of modern-day Russian society. The game received mixed reviews.

== Gameplay ==
The game begins in modern-day Russia, where the protagonist is complaining about the state of the economy and education in the country. After bragging about having sex with his neighbour's wife, the protagonist enters a time machine and is transported to Joseph Stalin's office in mid-1940s Russia, where they meet Stalin. The game takes place over several conversations with Stalin, where the player can discuss several things with him, including asking for his opinion on geopolitical matters and engaging in sexual activities with him.

Sex with Stalin has 26 endings, which include convincing Stalin of the benefits of yoga, causing him to live to the age of 102; getting Stalin interested in anime, which causes him to devote the resources of the Soviet Union to creating the Sailor Moon franchise; or having Stalin burst out from the player's chest, similar to a xenomorph from the Alien franchise.

== Reception ==
Sex with Stalin received mixed reviews. Rich Stanton of PC Gamer gave a positive review of the game, calling it "better than I expected" and a "labor of love", also praising its ambience. Honza Srp of the Czech news portal iDNES.cz spoke positively of the game, declaring that it would be enjoyable "if you like black humor and speak English" and praising its subversiveness, while also finding it to be better than the 2009 video game Stalin vs. Martians. Nate Christiansen of Foreign Policy gave a negative review of the game, calling it "surprisingly dull", and declaring that "not a single moment of it is erotic". Ashley Bardhan of MEL Magazine analysed the reviews the game received on Steam, finding that its reception from users was mostly positive, with the largest section of negative reviews coming from players who were disappointed that the game largely revolves around conversing with Stalin, rather than having sex with him.

The game received a negative reception from Russian communists. Maxim Suraykin, leader of the anti-revisionist Communists of Russia party, called for it to be banned and its developers arrested. The more moderate Communist Party of the Russian Federation called for it to be investigated for potentially lawbreaking content, with State Duma member Olga Alimova declaring that the game's developers were "clinically insane", stating that they should seek medical advice.

== See also ==
- Sex with Hitler
