= Rinse and Repeat =

2015 video game

- itch.io header art
- Developer: Robert Yang
- Engine: Unity
- Platforms: Linux, macOS, Windows
- Release: 18 September 2015
- Genre: Simulation
- Mode: Single-player

Rinse and Repeat is a 2015 erotic video game by independent developer Robert Yang, described as a "steamy first person showering game about giving a hunk a helping hand". Developed by Yang as a "fantasy about consent and safety", Rinse and Repeat features a procedurally generated schedule in which players are only able to interact with their virtual partner at times set by the game. The game received positive reception from reviewers, with praise directed to the game's use of time and waiting to represent consent and respect, and as a homoerotic commentary on the male experience of communal showering.

== Gameplay ==
Set in a gymnasium communal shower, Rinse and Repeat is an erotic game in which the player uses a controller or cursor to scrub a virtual partner on various parts of his body. The game features a procedurally generated schedule system in which a gymnasium bulletin board features the real-world times that the partner will be present, repeating across one hour on every day of the week. The player is required to wait until these times occur to play the game. When the partner is present, players can scrub him in various areas of the body, with the partner providing feedback on the accuracy and intensity of the scrubbing. At the end of a session of scrubbing one part of the partner's body, a percentage score is provided, with satisfactory sessions filling a heart meter. Once the player has filled the meter over three sessions, a scripted sequence occurs and the player completes the game.

== Development and release ==
New York City-based developer Robert Yang developed the game as a "sequel" to Hurt Me Plenty, a game that explored consent in the context of a simulated BDSM exchange of erotic spanking, and was similarly conceived as a "fantasy about consent and safety". Yang stated the game aimed to build upon and subvert the experience of its predecessor by placing the player in a more submissive role and interact with the digital partner on their terms. To reinforce the theme of waiting and delay as "important" to consensual sex, Yang developed a procedurally generated scheduling system in which players must wait to experience the gameplay, taking inspiration from Michael Brough's VESPER.5 and Pippin Barr's The Artist Is Present. Yang also created a unique particle system for the game to simulate the flow of water to emphasize the shape and body of the partner. The setting of the communal shower was intended as a "commentary" to address the "dangerous" environment communal showers have historically been for gay men, who "could be discovered or outed or beaten for looking at someone the wrong way". Yang aimed to subvert this environment by exploring the fantasy of "being able to shower and use public facilities while being gay" and doing "what homophobes are so irrationally afraid of us doing".

In July 2026, Yang announced the game would receive a "re-remaster" as part of the Radiator Forever collection. He also revealed the standalone version would no longer be updated.

== Reception ==
Rinse and Repeat received a positive reception from several publications, with praise directed to the game's use of time to create a relationship of commitment and consent between the player and game. Chris Priestman of Kill Screen observed the mechanics "reflect the importance of waiting in real sexual relationships", noting that the design highlighted the "agency of (the player's) partner...at the center of the fantasy" and emphasized the importance of consent. Similarly, Leigh Alexander of Boing Boing praised the game for being "effective at creating a sense of anticipation" in its use of schedules and waiting. Rinse and Repeat also prompted discussion on the relationship between homoeroticism and communal nudity, with The Telegraph describing the game's "cult popularity" as based in its interpretation as an attempt to "lampoon changing room behaviour". Mark Serrels of Kotaku expressed that the game "skewered" the "strange male experience" of communal showering. Laura Dale of Destructoid interpreted the game as providing an "enlightening window in to the male acknowledgement or denial of sexuality" through the setting of the communal shower.

=== Twitch ban ===
In September 2015, Rinse and Repeat was banned from being streamed Twitch. According to the online service, games that are focused on nudity are not allowed. The creator, Robert Yang, described the guideline as "a fucking disgrace", arguing that it discouraged artistic experimentation.
