= Bride of the Robot =

1989 video game

- Developer: Free Spirit Software
- Publishers: Free Spirit Software; CSJ Computersoft (Europe)
- Platforms: Amiga, Atari ST
- Release: 1989; Amiga: EU: June 1989
- Genre: Interactive fiction
- Mode: Single-player

Bride of the Robot is a 1989 erotic text adventure game developed and self-published by Free Spirit Software and released for the Amiga and Atari ST. The Amiga version of Bride of the Robot was published in Europe in June 1989 by CSJ Computersoft. Bride of the Robot is the third entry in the Brad Stallion series, and is preceded by Sex Vixens from Space (1989) and Planet of Lust (1989), and succeeded by Sex Olympics (1991).

== Plot ==
The graphics were criticized by reviewers, as were the game's many ways to die; attempting to collect balloons (pictured) is a game over.

While giving a scientific demonstration in Space City, Professor Wang demonstrated his invention of the first robot with a sex drive; the robot abruptly went berzerk, killing Wang and kidnapping beauty contest winner Miss Allura Galaxy. Brad Stallion, freelance government agent and captain of the phallic spaceship the Big Thruster, has been assigned by the Federated Government to rescue Miss Galaxy. Stallion awakens hungover on one of Mammaria's moons and must recover the missing Big Thruster before setting out on his mission; if he fails to rescue Miss Galaxy, the entire universe's male population loses their sex drive, causing the human race to die out. Over the course of his mission, Brad Stallion travels through time using the late Professor's time machine.

== Gameplay ==
While the majority of inputs in Bride of the Robot are inputted through text commands, objects and characters may be interacted with using the mouse in the style of a point-and-click adventure. The player may move in the cardinal directions using the arrow keys, and certain UI elements may be accessed through shortcut keys. 'I' may be inputted to access the inventory, 'L' for information on current location, and 'S' for game status; the Big Thruster's computer AI Sandie gives advice pertinent to the player's location and situation.

Bride of the Robot has a built-in option to send a transcript of the game's text to a printer.

== Release ==
The Amiga version of Bride of the Robot was published in Europe in June 1989 by CSJ Computersoft.

== Reception ==
QuestBusters reviewed the Amiga version of Bride of the Robot in a February 1990 issue, criticizing the game's graphics as "not great", but praising the game's 'juvenile' humor. QuestBusters criticized Bride of the Robot's puzzles as "dumb", as well as the abundance of ways to die, stating that "To create a series of stupid puzzles, kill the player and razz him when he dies shows the mentality and morality of a thirteen year-old juvenile delinquent." QuestBusters noted the game as overpriced, expressing that real pornography's cheaper and has more sexual content, and overall summarized Bride of the Robot as "disappointing".

German gaming magazine Amiga Joker gave the Amiga version of Bride of the Robot an overall score of 34%, criticizing the game's plot as 'stupid' and the overall quality of the game as 'outdated', calling it "a cheap game running on Commodore 64 code from 1985." Amiga Joker criticized Bride of the Robot's graphics, sound effects, and parser, expressing that "The graphics are low-quality and anything but exciting, the sound is limited to a beep-y wedding march and a few miserable sound effects ... all in all the parser barely understands anything". Amiga Joker summarised Bride of the Robot as having "essentially nothing to look forward to", further expressing that "If you were to use the money [spent on the game] to buy a porno magazine, it would be better spent."
