= Studio FOW =

Pornographic production company in the US

- Industry: Pornography
- Founded: July 9, 2014; 12 years ago
- Founders: Darkcrow
- Area served: Worldwide
- Products: Pornographic films and erotic video games
- Website: Official website

Studio FOW (sometimes also stylised as StudioFOW or Studio F.O.W.) is a pornographic production company based in America. Known for the production of animated films featuring video game characters, the studio's content can be described as computer-animated hardcore pornography, often in a high fantasy setting. It is also a video game developer doing business as FOW Interactive (formerly FOW Games).

== History ==
Founded in 2014 by "Darkcrow", Studio FOW is a crowdfunded group of 3D animators who produce pornographic parodies of popular video games and other media with Source Filmmaker. The group has released several full-length films, alongside other animation shorts, animation loops, and Flash games. Their first major game release, Subverse, received over $2 million from Kickstarter backers within one month in April 2018. Prior to Subverse, their flagship work is the Kunoichi series (a parody of the Ninja Gaiden series). Studio FOW gained notoriety upon creating a parody of Tomb Raider titled Lara in Trouble in 2014. The 17-minute film was distributed on multiple online platforms and attained viral status, leading to a studio expansion. Studio FOW stated that it would not create Overwatch pornography after receiving a cease-and-desist order from Blizzard Entertainment in 2015 for their World of Warcraft-related projects. In December 2018, Studio FOW was permanently banned from the crowdfunding platform Patreon for a sex scene involving a werewolf and a woman.

== Major productions ==
=== Selected filmography ===
- Lara in Trouble (Feb. 6, 2014) – featuring Lara Croft
- Kunoichi: Broken Princess (Nov. 28, 2014) – featuring Kasumi
- Bioshag: Trinity (July 4, 2015) – featuring Elizabeth
- Kunoichi 2: Fall of the Shrine Maiden (Nov. 13, 2015) – featuring Kasumi and Momiji
- Scarlet Nights (June 28, 2016) – featuring Harley Quinn
- Siren's Call (Oct. 16, 2016) – featuring Isabela
- Nightmare: Code Valentine (March 1, 2017) – featuring Jill Valentine
- Songbird's Shame (June 4, 2017) – featuring Jessica Rabbit
- Mila Red Riding Hood (Sept. 5, 2017) – featuring Mila
- Nier: First [Ass]embly (Nov. 30, 2017) – featuring 2B
- Severance (Feb. 28, 2018) – featuring Helena Douglas
- Ghosts of Paradise (June 14, 2018) – featuring Major Motoko Kusanagi
- Kunoichi 3: Dark Butterfly (Dec. 14, 2018) – featuring Kasumi, Momiji and Ayane

=== Video games ===
- Subverse (March 26, 2021) – original content
