= Sex with Hitler =

2022 pornographic video game

- Developer: Romantic Room
- Engine: Windows, macOS
- Release: 23 January 2022
- Genres: Isometric shooter Visual novel
- Mode: Single-player

Sex with Hitler is a 2022 pornographic isometric shooter visual novel video game developed by Romantic Room, wherein the player takes control of Adolf Hitler, dictator of Nazi Germany, and is tasked with dating four women of various ethnicities.

The game received generally negative reviews, with critics disputing the game's portrayal of Hitler as having two testicles, as well as deeming it poorly animated and un-erotic.

== Plot ==
Sex with Hitler begins at the end of World War 2, where Hitler, described as having "lost everything", is plotting to flee Berlin before the city is captured by the Red Army. However, before he does this he resolves to have sex with numerous women.

== Gameplay ==
Sex with Hitler consists of isometric top-down shooter segments interspersed with story segments wherein Hitler converses and has sex with numerous women who make up the game's supporting cast, all rendered in anime style. The game features numerous explicit hardcore sex scenes between Hitler and the women.

== Reception ==
Sex with Hitler received negative reviews from critics. Mira Fox, writing in The Forward, described it as "absurd and amateurish" with "egregiously bad art". Ari Notis of Kotaku also gave a negative review, describing the game as being filled with "particularly unpleasant" scenes. Samantha Cole, writing in Motherboard, lambasted the game's shooting segments as "incredibly cheap", the dialogue as "deranged and boring" and the sex scenes as "unsatisfying". All three reviewers recognised that the game was primarily concerned with using Hitler's presence as an attempt to draw attention rather than to genuinely portray him positively, though Notis and Fox criticized the game for displaying Hitler as extremely muscular and a masterful seducer, as they felt this portrayed the dictator in a too-positive light.

=== Historical accuracy ===
Sex with Hitler's depiction of Adolf Hitler as possessing two testicles aroused controversy among many users on Steam who claimed the game was historically inaccurate; Hitler being commonly believed to have had only one testicle. Cole, Fox and Notis all recommended that users concerned with Hitler's double-testicled depiction should play Sniper Elite 3, wherein Hitler having only one testicle is an important plot detail.

== Sequels ==
Sex with Hitler received several sequels including Sex with Hitler 2, Sex with Hitler: 2069, Sex with Hitler 3D and Sex with Hitler: WW2 all available on Steam.

== See also ==
- Possible monorchism of Adolf Hitler
- Sexuality of Adolf Hitler
- Sex with Stalin
