= Subverse =

Adult RPG video game

- Developer: FOW Interactive
- Publisher: Streembit Ltd
- Engine: Unreal Engine
- Platform: Windows
- Release: WW: March 26, 2021; (early access)
- Genres: Tactical role-playing, shoot 'em up
- Mode: Single-player

Subverse is a tactical role-playing shoot 'em up hybrid pornographic video game developed by FOW Interactive and published by Streembit Ltd for Microsoft Windows. It was released on Steam in early access on 26 March 2021 and 25 October 2021 on GOG.com. The full game (version 1.0) was made available on Steam and GOG.com on November 15, 2024.

== Gameplay ==
Subverse is set in the fictional Prodigium Galaxy in which humans and different species of aliens co-exist under rule by a tyrannical government known as the Imperium. The gameplay mixes visual novel-style storytelling with completion of missions in tactical grid combat and space shooter sections. Much of the game also features adult themes involving explicit sex scenes with non-human characters and players leveling up "waifu loyalty" from female characters to unlock additional sex scenes.

== Plot and characters ==
Subverse is set in the far future in a galaxy called Prodigium, mostly ruled by a prudish government known as the Imperium, whose ideology values virginity over sex. Prodigium comprises five nebulae: the Dragon Nebula (home of the Imperium); the Hydra Nebula (home to an alien species called the kloi); the Kraken nebula (home to the nikith and vanneran species); the Yeti Nebula (home to the teelee species); and the Griffin Nebula, where a colony named Nü Vegas was established on a planet by stranded humans (referred to as solars) originating from a prison convoy with no way to return to Earth. The main protagonist is a solar only known as the Captain, a former resident of Nü Vegas and the newly self-proclaimed owner of Mary Celeste, a spaceship he found mysteriously adrift without any of its original crew. As the story progresses, the Captain joins an underground movement along with his harem of recruited female crewmembers to topple the Imperium's rule over Prodigium.

== Development and release ==
Subverse is the debut commercial video game of FOW Interactive, a video game studio of the animated pornography company Studio FOW. Crowdfunding for Subverse on Kickstarter raised over £1.6 million within one month, making the game one of the top twenty highest-funded Kickstarter games as of May 24, 2019. The first act was released on Steam on March 26, 2021. For Germany, South Korea, China and all of the other geographic areas that do not permit downloading Subverse from Steam, FOW Interactive set up the website streemster.com with the intent of enabling customers to download the game. However, the site has not been active since the supposed launch, and FOW Interactive have not made a statement regarding why the site never went live or when players would be able to use it.

== Reception ==
On the weekend immediately following its release, Subverse reached #2 on the Steam sales charts, behind Valheim.
