= GAG The Impotent Mystery =

- First release: GAG: The Impotent Mystery; 1997
- Latest release: GAG 2: Back in the Future; 2002

GAG: The Impotent Mystery (ГЭГ: Отвязное приключение 1997) and its add-on GAG + Harry on Vacation (ГЭГ+ Гарри в отпуске 1999), sequel GAG 2: Back in the Future (ГЭГ 2: Назад в будущее 2002), and spin-off The Adventures of Harry: The evidence Under the Underwear (Приключения Гарри: Улики под нижним бельём) are a series of four Russian adventure games.

They are parodies and erotic-themed games emulating the Leisure Suit Larry series.

The player takes the role of Gary Tusker, a secret service agent who specialises in preventing sexual and religious perversion. GAG: The Impotent Mystery is a first-person, point-and-click and inventory-based adventure game. It is often considered the first Russian game in the quest genre.
