= Lula (series) =

Logo used for Lula: The Sexy Empire

Lula is a series of adult video games placed in the business world of hardcore pornography. They feature the title character Lula, a blonde busty female, and provide titillation and humour. They were developed by Interactive Strip (Redfire Software) and published by cdv Software Entertainment. The sexual theme of this series of games caused some controversy, particularly in the United States where the games were forbidden in several states (e.g. California) and some releases of the game were not carried by Amazon.

== Games ==
=== Lula Inside ===
Lula Inside
- Developer: Cdv Software Entertainment
- Publisher: Take-Two Interactive
- Platform: Microsoft Windows
- Release: EU: 1998
- Genre: Simulation

Lula Inside (also known as Lula Virtual Babe) is a virtual tamagotchi. It is the second game in the Lula series.

=== Lula Pinball ===
- Developer: Independent Arts Software
- Publisher: Cdv Software Entertainment
- Platform: Microsoft Windows
- Release: 1999
- Genre: Simulation

Lula Pinball (also known as Lula Flipper) is a Lula themed pinball game.

=== Lula Strip Poker ===
Lula Strip Poker is a strip poker game where the player challenges Lula.

=== Wet Attack: The Empire Cums Back ===
Wet Attack: The Empire Cums Back
- Developer: Interactive Strip
- Publisher: Cdv Software Entertainment
- Platform: Microsoft Windows
- Release: 1999
- Genre: Strategy

Wet Attack: The Empire Cums Back is the third Lula game released. The player begins by stealing a spaceship, named "The Tit", then begins searching for Lula, who is lost in space. Following leads, the player travels from planet to planet, picking up cargo and selling for a profit. Sometimes the cargo includes contraband, which pays well, but is risky. From time to time the spaceship is attacked by pirates who try to steal cargo or girls. Players must assemble a full-body ship before they can save the lost Lula.

The player has to hire a crew for the ship, a gunner and an engineer, and keep them happy. The crew is all female, so players have to "keep them happy", or may hire up to three gigolos if they would rather get on with the missions. This helps keep the ship together. Players can also buy upgrades for "the Tit"; engines, guns, shields, spy satellites etc. After a while they can buy a "second Tit", doubling the size of the ship. While docking at a planet, the ship doubles as a brothel. The player hires girls to work in the bedrooms, and keeps them healthy, sexy, and satisfied.

==== Reception ====
Reception

Review scores
Publication	Score
GameStar	20%
Jeuxvideo.com	7/20
PC Accelerator	4/10
PC Games (DE)	52%

The game received unfavourable reviews from critics.

=== Lula Online ===
Lula Online
- Developer: Lula Online GmbH
- Platform: Browser
- Release: 2014
- Genre: Simulation

The latest entry in the series, Lula Online, was a browser based simulation RPG where it played much like Wet: The Sexy Empire, though more modernized than its older counterpart. It is the only entry not developed or published by Cdv Software Entertainment. Lula Online's servers were shut down in Spring 2018.
