= Earl Babbie =

American sociologist

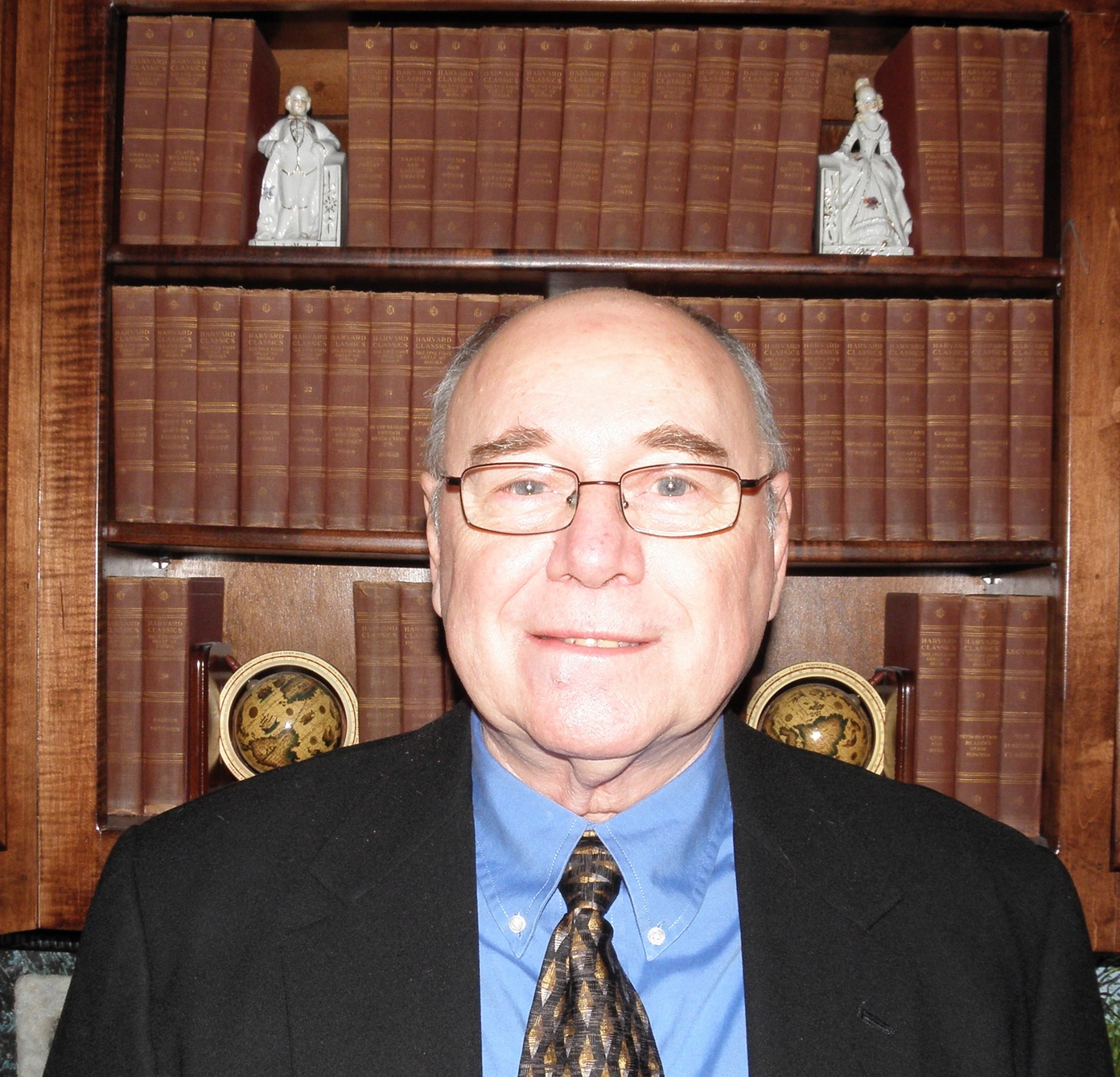
- Born: January 8, 1938 (age 88); Detroit, Michigan, US
- Citizenship: American
- Education: Harvard College (1960); University of California, Berkeley (1966); University of California, Berkeley (1969)
- Awards: Professor Emeritus Distinguished Visiting Professor, at California State University Lester F. Ward Award
- Scientific career
- Fields: Sociology
- Workplaces: University of Hawaii (1968 to 1979) Chapman University (1987 to 2007)

Earl Robert Babbie (born January 8, 1938), is an American sociologist who holds the position of Campbell Professor Emeritus in Behavioral Sciences at Chapman University. He is best known for his book The Practice of Social Research (first published in 1975), currently in its 15th English edition, with numerous non-English editions.

== Education ==
Earl Babbie was born in Detroit, Michigan, and grew up in Vermont and New Hampshire. In 1956, at the age of eighteen, he moved to Harvard Yard to attend Harvard College on a Naval Reserve Officer Training Corps scholarship where he graduated in 1960 with a B.A. in social relations.

From 1960 to 1963 Babbie served tours in the United States Marine Corps, as a disbursing officer in Okinawa, Taiwan, Japan, and the Philippines.

Babbie then went on to complete graduate studies at the University of California, Berkeley where he received an M.A. in 1966. That same year he was honorably discharged from the USMC Reserve as First Lieutenant. He stayed at University of California, Berkeley to complete a Ph.D. in 1969.

== Teaching career ==
Earl Babbie moved to Hawaii where he taught sociology at the University of Hawaii. He taught there from 1968 to 1979, at which point he resigned to pursue a full-time research and writing career for the next 8 years. In 1987, Babbie joined the faculty at Chapman University in Orange, California where he remained until retirement from teaching in January 2006.

== Work as an author ==
Babbie is best known for his many textbooks he has written, which have been widely adopted in colleges throughout the United States and elsewhere. He is also an author of research articles and monographs. Throughout his career he has been active in the American Sociological Association and served on the ASA's executive committee. He is also a past president of the Pacific Sociological Association and California Sociological Association.

In 2016, Babbie launched an online project, Solutions without Problems, coining the term soluprobs. The intention of the project is to draw attention to the many times that "solutions" have been instituted to solve non-existent "problems." Examples include Voter ID Laws, Banning Same-Sex Marriage, the U. S. Invasion of Iraq in 2003, Outlawing Marijuana, the Salem Witch Trials, and many more. The goal of the project is to engender awareness and participation that reduces the damage this type of misguided social policy inflicts on society.

== Awards and recognition ==
In 1988, Babbie was announced as a Distinguished Visiting Professor, at California State University, and Honorary Member, Honors Program Student Association, 1994. In August 2000, Babbie received the Lester F. Ward Award, given by the Society for Applied Sociology for distinguished contributions to applied sociology. In 2010, Chapman University began establishing the Earl Babbie Research Center, with the official dedication on March 21, 2012. The center's mission is global in purview and its concerns include human rights, social justice, peaceful solutions to social conflicts and environmental sustainability. According to the center's website homepage, the research center is "dedicated to empowering students and faculty to conduct studies that address critical social, behavioral, economic and environmental problems."

== Published books ==
- 'To Comfort and to Challenge' (1967 with Charles Y. Glock and Benjamin B. Ringer)
- 'Science and Morality in Medicine' (1970)
- 'Survey Research Methods' (first edition 1973)
- 'The Practice of Social Research' (first edition 1975)(15th edition 2020)
- 'Society by Agreement' (first edition in 1977)
- 'Understanding Sociology' (1982)
- 'Apple Logo for Teachers' (1984)
- 'You Can Make a Difference' (1985)
- 'Observing Ourselves: Essays in Social Research' (1986) (Second Edition published Long Grove, IL: Waveland Press, 2015)
- 'The Sociological Spirit' (first edition 1987)
- 'Research Methods for Social Work' (first edition in 1993, with Allen Rubin)
- 'What is Society?' (1993)
- 'Adventures in Social Research' (first edition in 1993 with Fred Halley)
- 'Research Methods for Criminal Justice and Criminology' (first edition in 1995 with Michael Maxfield)
- 'Adventures in Criminal Justice Research' (first edition in 1997 with George W. Dowdall and Fred Halley)
- 'The Basics of Social Research (first edition in 1999)
- 'Exploring Social Issues' (first edition in 1999 with Fred Halley, Joseph F. Healy, and John Boli)
- 'Fundamentals of Social Research' (first edition in 2002 with Lucia Benaquisto)
- 'The Basics of Communication Research' (first edition in 2004 with Leslie Baxter)
- 'Introduction to Social Research' (5th Edition 2011) 'Translated in Greek as Εισαγωγή στην κοινωνική έρευνα
- ‘Solutions without Problems’ 2024 (self-published)
- 'Social Research Counts' (first edition 2013)
- 'The Kingdom' (2020) https://www.smashwords.com/books/view/1031335
