= Tearoom Trade =

1970 book by Laud Humphreys

Tearoom Trade: Impersonal Sex in Public Places
- Author: Laud Humphreys
- Language: English
- Subject: Homosexuality
- Publisher: Duckworth
- Publication date: 1970
- Publication place: United Kingdom
- Media type: Print
- Pages: 180
- ISBN: 0-7156-0551-8

Tearoom Trade: Impersonal Sex in Public Places is a 1970 non-fiction book by American sociologist Laud Humphreys, based on his 1968 Ph.D. dissertation "Tearoom Trade: A Study of Homosexual Encounters in Public Places". The study is an analysis of men who participate in anonymous sex with other men in public lavatories, a practice known as "tea-rooming" or "cottaging". Humphreys asserted that the men participating in such activity came from diverse social backgrounds, had differing personal motives for seeking sex in such venues, and variously self-perceived as "straight", "bisexual", or "gay".

Tearoom Trade debunked many of the stereotypes associated with individuals who participate in anonymous male-male sexual activity in public places, demonstrating that many of the participants lived otherwise conventional lives as family men and respected members of their communities; further, their activities posed no threat to non-participants. In the course of his research, Humphreys misrepresented his identity and intent to his subjects, and tracked their identities through their license plate numbers. Tearoom Trade has subsequently been the subject of continued debate over privacy for research participants, with The New York Times noting that Tearoom Trade is "now taught as a primary example of unethical social research."

== Study ==
The book is an ethnographic study of anonymous male homosexual sexual encounters in public toilets (a practice that was known as "tea-rooming" in U.S. gay slang and "cottaging" in British English).

Humphreys was able to observe and describe various social cues (body language, hand language, etc.) developed and used by participants in those places. The encounters usually involved three people: the two engaged in the sexual activity, and a look-out, called "watchqueen" in slang. By offering his services as the "watchqueen", Humphreys was able to observe the activities of other participants.

38% of Humphreys' subjects were neither bisexual nor homosexual; 24% were clearly bisexual; 24% were single and were covert homosexuals; and only 14% corresponded to the popular stereotype of homosexuality: clear members of the gay community interested in primarily homosexual relationships. Because Humphreys was able to confirm that 54% of his subjects were outwardly heterosexual men with unsuspecting wives at home, an important thesis of Tearoom Trade is the incongruity between the private self and the social self for many of the men engaging in this form of homosexual activity. Specifically, they put on a "breastplate of righteousness" (social and political conservatism) in an effort to conceal their deviation from social norms.

Humphreys also concluded that such encounters were harmless, and posed no danger of harassment to straight men. His research has convinced many police departments that such encounters resulted in victimless crime; hence they were able to focus on other problems.

== Criticism ==
Humphreys revealed his role to some of those he observed, but he noted that those who tended to talk with him openly were better educated; as he continued his research, he decided to conceal his identity in order to avoid response bias. Humphreys' rationale was that because of public stigma associated with the homosexual activities in question, and his subjects' desires to keep their activities secret, many were unlikely to allow him an opportunity for observation and follow-up interview were he to reveal himself as a researcher.

Humphreys' study has been criticized on ethical grounds in that he observed acts of homosexuality by masquerading as a voyeur, did not get his subjects’ consent, used their license plate numbers to track them down, and interviewed them in disguise without revealing the true intent of his studies (he claimed to be a health service interviewer, and asked them questions about their race, marital status, occupation, and so on). Tearoom Trade has been criticized for privacy violations, and deceit – both in the initial setting, and in the follow-up interviews. After the study was published, the controversy in Humphreys' own department at Washington University in St. Louis resulted in about half the faculty leaving the department. There was also a lively debate in the popular press; notably journalist Nicholas von Hoffman, writing for The Washington Post at that time, condemned all social scientists, accusing them of indifference.

Nonetheless, others have defended Tearoom Trade, pointing out that participants were conducting their activities in a public place and that the deceit was harmless, since Humphreys designed the study with respect for their individual privacy, not identifying them in his published work.

Additionally, the Tearoom Trade study focuses on these interactions through investigation of possible social, psychological, or physiological reasons for this behavior.

As Earl R. Babbie notes, the "tearoom trade controversy [on whether this research was ethical or not] has never been resolved"; and it is likely to remain a subject of debates in the conceivable future.

== See also ==
- Public sex
- Cottaging
