= Hurt Me Plenty =

2014 video game

- itch.io header art
- Developer: Robert Yang
- Platforms: Linux, macOS, Windows
- Release: 2 December 2014
- Mode: Single-player

Hurt Me Plenty is a 2014 video game by independent developer Robert Yang. Described as a "short educational game" by its creator, Hurt Me Plenty simulates a BDSM interaction where players negotiate and perform spanking on a virtual partner, with the player required to respect the boundaries agreed with the partner to replay the game. Upon release, Hurt Me Plenty received positive reviews, with praise directed to the game's tender and mutual representation of sex and communication, noting the game's potential use as a medium for education about consent and boundaries. In 2016, Yang released a revised and updated version of Hurt Me Plenty as part of Radiator 2, a compilation of his previous games.

== Gameplay ==
A screenshot of gameplay in the Radiator version of Hurt Me Plenty, representing the negotiation of boundaries with the partner.

Gameplay in Hurt Me Plenty takes place over three stages, playable using the mouse or with a Leap Motion controller, in which the player simulates a scene of spanking with a computer partner. In the first stage, players "negotiate" boundaries and roles by using the controller to shake hands, providing the player to agree upon with a randomized level of intensity, the level of clothes worn by the partner, and the safeword chosen. In the second stage, players are able to spank the partner by moving the controller back and forth, with the frequency affecting the level of intensity. The player is given feedback from the partner on the level of intensity experienced, with the partner providing enthusiastic responses, pain responses or using their safeword if the intensity exceeds the agreed level. This stage ends when the spanking discontinues or when the player continues to spank the partner after the safeword is used. In the third stage, representing aftercare, the player uses the controller to rub the shoulder of their partner, who provides feedback on the appropriateness of the intensity of spanking given by the player and whether they respected the boundaries agreed at the start of the game. If the player violates the boundaries of the partner by continuing to spank them after the safeword is used, the player is locked out of replaying the game as the partner is "recovering from the previous player's abuse" for a specified time limit of several days.

== Development ==
Hurt Me Plenty was created by New York-based independent developer Robert Yang. Yang designed the game as a response and critique to the representation of sex in contemporary video games, citing the transactional and reward-based depiction of sex in games such as those in the Mass Effect and Dragon Age series as "cold" and based on a culture of "manipulation and perceived entitlement to bodies". In response, Yang intended to create a game simulating sex as "an on-going process" emphasized on "tender interactions" and "intimacy". To design a responsive process, Yang modelled the experience on BDSM due to the emphasis on consent in those communities, integrating concepts practiced in BDSM including theories of consent, soft and hard limits of pain and intensity, and aftercare. Yang noted the game was best played in a group, in the event that players violate boundaries and lock future players out of the game to reinforce the message that "abuse doesn't just hurt an individual, it also hurts a community and makes it less safe of a place." Whilst Yang noted the game was not intended as pornographic and viewed the content as "too formal and distant" to be pornographic, Yang encountered problems with the sale and promotion of Hurt Me Plenty and similar titles due to their violation of content policies on payment and streaming services.

Following release, Yang contributed to presentations and discussions about the game and its themes at the NYU Game Center in 2014, and IndieCade in 2018. In 2016, Yang re-released a revised and updated version of Hurt Me Plenty as part of Radiator 2, a compilation intended to enhance the "accessibility and preservation" of his earlier works, and provided additional graphical and gameplay enhancements to the game in a 2017 re-release of the compilation titled Radiator 2: Anniversary Edition.

== Reception ==
Reception of Hurt Me Plenty was positive, with reviewers directing praise to its intimate depiction of sex and consent. Kat Brewster of Rock Paper Shotgun noted the game's positive representation of "consent and communication" in the game, citing its realism and "attention to care" in its representation of aftercare. Describing Hurt Met Plenty as a "revealing look into how BDSM communities actually tend to work", Nathan Grayson of Kotaku noted the game's use of "intimate interactions" as a gameplay mechanic, contrasting its design with approaches to sex in mainstream games as a transactional reward. Merritt Kopas of Boing Boing praised the game's departure from "competition and domination" and "more about intimacy than conquest", finding the game instilled a "sense of responsibility and care" towards the character. Butt similarly wrote "what make's Robert's game so novel is the way he has built the idea of consent into the virtual play".

Several reviewers noted the game's broader relevance as an educational medium about consent and boundaries. Derrick Clifton of Mic praised the game for "teaching people about why consent matters" in giving players "a hands-on approach to responsibly navigating sexual boundaries", highlighting its focus on demonstrating the "immediate consequences" of violating those boundaries. Merritt Kopas of Boing Boing observed the game's exploration of consent and care pushed players "to reconsider their relationships to games, themselves, and one another". Noting the game raised discussions around the "line between empowerment and subjugation" through its representation of BDSM, David Rudin of Kill Screen observed that the discussions raised by the game "exist in all relationships" and provided a model for conversations around consent. Describing the game as "powerful", Pippin Barr observed that Hurt Me Plenty created a "conversational approach to violence", finding that its design "leaves space for us to speak and act, and for the violence ... to talk back."
