= List of Haunted PS1 games =

The list of Haunted PS1 games includes 87 video games created by independent developers for the annual Haunted PS1 series of compilations, curated by Irish video game developer Breogán Hackett. The first compilation, Haunted PS1 Demo Disc 2020, was released on 6 February 2020 on the platform itch.io, containing seventeen horror games from various independent developers. Games published under the Haunted PS1 series of releases have received attention as representative of the emerging genre of independent horror games influenced by the graphics of the PlayStation, as well as important to bringing critical and commercial attention to independent horror games generally.

== List ==
Compilation	Title	Developer	Notes
Haunted PS1 Demo Disc 2020; Original Release date: 6 February 2020	A Place, Forbidden	A Team Forbidden	Full version released on 25 June 2020.
Haunted PS1 Demo Disc 2020; Original Release date: 6 February 2020	Dead Heat	Saxton Software	Full version under development.
Haunted PS1 Demo Disc 2020; Original Release date: 6 February 2020	Dread Delusion	Lovely Hellplace	Full version released on 14 May 2024.
Haunted PS1 Demo Disc 2020; Original Release date: 6 February 2020	Effigy	Redact Games	Full version under development.
Haunted PS1 Demo Disc 2020; Original Release date: 6 February 2020	Erasure	Sam Dick	
Haunted PS1 Demo Disc 2020; Original Release date: 6 February 2020	Fatum Betula	Bryce Bucher	Full version released on 21 June 2020.
Haunted PS1 Demo Disc 2020; Original Release date: 6 February 2020	FILTHBREED	Borja Zorozo	
Haunted PS1 Demo Disc 2020; Original Release date: 6 February 2020	Heartworm	Vincent Adinolfi	Full version released on 31 July 2025.
Haunted PS1 Demo Disc 2020; Original Release date: 6 February 2020	In Somnio	Jan Malitschek	
Haunted PS1 Demo Disc 2020; Original Release date: 6 February 2020	KILLER BEES	Neurobew	
Haunted PS1 Demo Disc 2020; Original Release date: 6 February 2020	Neko Yume 猫夢	Modus Interactive	
Haunted PS1 Demo Disc 2020; Original Release date: 6 February 2020	Ode to a Moon	Colorfiction	Full version under development.
Haunted PS1 Demo Disc 2020; Original Release date: 6 February 2020	Orange County	Nicholas Branaccio	
Haunted PS1 Demo Disc 2020; Original Release date: 6 February 2020	Sauna2000	Amos Sorri / Moya Horror	
Haunted PS1 Demo Disc 2020; Original Release date: 6 February 2020	Snowy Castle	Donut Cove	
Haunted PS1 Demo Disc 2020; Original Release date: 6 February 2020	Tasty Ramen	Marcus Horn	Beta version released on 21 June 2020.
Haunted PS1 Demo Disc 2020; Original Release date: 6 February 2020	Until Biglight	Catherine Brinegar	
Haunted PS1 Demo Disc 2021; Original Release date: 25 March 2021
Haunted PS1 Demo Disc 2021; Original Release date: 25 March 2021	Agony of a Dying MMO	Salem Hughes	Full version cancelled.
Haunted PS1 Demo Disc 2021; Original Release date: 25 March 2021	An Outcry	GlasStadtGames	Full version released on 6 January 2022.
Haunted PS1 Demo Disc 2021; Original Release date: 25 March 2021	Apolysis	Valerie Dusk & Valerie Paris	
Haunted PS1 Demo Disc 2021; Original Release date: 25 March 2021	Chasing Static	Headware Games	Full version released on 15 October 2021.
Haunted PS1 Demo Disc 2021; Original Release date: 25 March 2021	ECHOSTASIS	ENIGMA STUDIO	Full version released on 30 May 2024.
Haunted PS1 Demo Disc 2021; Original Release date: 25 March 2021	Fiend's Isle	Ian Williams	
Haunted PS1 Demo Disc 2021; Original Release date: 25 March 2021	Ghastly Goodies	Cyreides	
Haunted PS1 Demo Disc 2021; Original Release date: 25 March 2021	Janitor Bleeds	Korpus	Full version released on 7 April 2022.
Haunted PS1 Demo Disc 2021; Original Release date: 25 March 2021	Lorn's Lure	Rubeki	Full version released on 20 September 2024.
Haunted PS1 Demo Disc 2021; Original Release date: 25 March 2021	Loveland	DEVHOUR GAMES	
Haunted PS1 Demo Disc 2021; Original Release date: 25 March 2021	Mummy Sandbox	Z. Bill	
Haunted PS1 Demo Disc 2021; Original Release date: 25 March 2021	Pathogen-X	Sodaraptor	
Haunted PS1 Demo Disc 2021; Original Release date: 25 March 2021	Peeb Adventures	Fever Dream Johnny	
Haunted PS1 Demo Disc 2021; Original Release date: 25 March 2021	Protagoras Bleeds	Bryce Bucher	
Haunted PS1 Demo Disc 2021; Original Release date: 25 March 2021	Risu	Ryan Trawick	Full version under development.
Haunted PS1 Demo Disc 2021; Original Release date: 25 March 2021	Still Ridge	Jaybee	Full version under development.
Haunted PS1 Demo Disc 2021; Original Release date: 25 March 2021	That Which Gave Chase	Aslak	Full version released on 23 June 2021.
Haunted PS1 Demo Disc 2021; Original Release date: 25 March 2021	The Chameleon	Merlino Games	Full version released on 13 July 2021.
Haunted PS1 Demo Disc 2021; Original Release date: 25 March 2021	The Drowning Machine	Aidan Cushing	
Haunted PS1 Demo Disc 2021; Original Release date: 25 March 2021	The Heilwald Loophole	Jamathan	Full version released on 4 February 2022.
Haunted PS1 Demo Disc 2021; Original Release date: 25 March 2021	The Lunar Effect	Negative Entities	
Haunted PS1 Demo Disc 2021; Original Release date: 25 March 2021	The Salt Order	Kham	
Haunted PS1 Demo Disc 2021; Original Release date: 25 March 2021	tmOD	tm	
Haunted PS1 Demo Disc 2021; Original Release date: 25 March 2021	Toree 3D	Siactro	Full version released on 9 April 2021.
Haunted PS1 Demo Disc 2021; Original Release date: 25 March 2021	散歩 - Walk	Kazumi Games	
Haunted PS1 Demo Disc: Spectral Mall; Original Release date: 28 August 2022
Haunted PS1 Demo Disc: Spectral Mall; Original Release date: 28 August 2022	10 Dead Doves	Duonix Studios	Full version released on 13 December 2024.
Haunted PS1 Demo Disc: Spectral Mall; Original Release date: 28 August 2022	BÅÅBÖSÅÅNGJÅÅR	ZIK	
Haunted PS1 Demo Disc: Spectral Mall; Original Release date: 28 August 2022	Beeknighted	MicrotonalMatt	
Haunted PS1 Demo Disc: Spectral Mall; Original Release date: 28 August 2022	Blast Cats	BlastCatsDev	Full version under development.
Haunted PS1 Demo Disc: Spectral Mall; Original Release date: 28 August 2022	DEAD LETTER DEPT.	Mike Monroe	Full version released on 30 January 2025.
Haunted PS1 Demo Disc: Spectral Mall; Original Release date: 28 August 2022	ENCHAIN	mattlawr	
Haunted PS1 Demo Disc: Spectral Mall; Original Release date: 28 August 2022	Fear the Spotlight	Cozy Game Pals	Taken down, re-published with Blumhouse Games on 22 October 2024.
Haunted PS1 Demo Disc: Spectral Mall; Original Release date: 28 August 2022	Future Reality	Future Reality Softworks	
Haunted PS1 Demo Disc: Spectral Mall; Original Release date: 28 August 2022	Gob	gamma girl labs	
Haunted PS1 Demo Disc: Spectral Mall; Original Release date: 28 August 2022	House of Necrosis	Warkus	Full version released on 6 October 2025.
Haunted PS1 Demo Disc: Spectral Mall; Original Release date: 28 August 2022	Miracle Bug and the Electric Limbo	Autumn Rain	
Haunted PS1 Demo Disc: Spectral Mall; Original Release date: 28 August 2022	Mortal Meal	Goblin Council	Full version released on 16 February 2023.
Haunted PS1 Demo Disc: Spectral Mall; Original Release date: 28 August 2022	MOTHERED - A ROLE-PLAYING HORROR GAME	ENIGMA STUDIO	Full version released on 24 December 2021.
Haunted PS1 Demo Disc: Spectral Mall; Original Release date: 28 August 2022	Northstar Courier	Ben Drury	
Haunted PS1 Demo Disc: Spectral Mall; Original Release date: 28 August 2022	Nowhere, MI	Feverdream Johnny	
Haunted PS1 Demo Disc: Spectral Mall; Original Release date: 28 August 2022	Perlin Festival	Talon Zane	
Haunted PS1 Demo Disc: Spectral Mall; Original Release date: 28 August 2022	Sorry, We're Open	oates	Full version released on 17 February 2023.
Haunted PS1 Demo Disc: Spectral Mall; Original Release date: 28 August 2022	THEY SPEAK FROM THE ABYSS	Nikki Kalpa	Full version under development.
Haunted PS1 Demo Disc: Flipside Frights; Original Release date: 11 January 2025
Haunted PS1 Demo Disc: Flipside Frights; Original Release date: 11 January 2025	Blessed Burden	Podoba Interactive	
Haunted PS1 Demo Disc: Flipside Frights; Original Release date: 11 January 2025	Death In Abyss	Agelvik	
Haunted PS1 Demo Disc: Flipside Frights; Original Release date: 11 January 2025	Eclipsium	Housefire	Full version released on 19 September 2025.
Haunted PS1 Demo Disc: Flipside Frights; Original Release date: 11 January 2025	FriendShapes	RainingLamppost	
Haunted PS1 Demo Disc: Flipside Frights; Original Release date: 11 January 2025	The Hungry Fly	Erupting Avocado	
Haunted PS1 Demo Disc: Flipside Frights; Original Release date: 11 January 2025	Juice	Colorfiction	
Haunted PS1 Demo Disc: Flipside Frights; Original Release date: 11 January 2025	The Lacerator	Games From The Abyss	
Haunted PS1 Demo Disc: Flipside Frights; Original Release date: 11 January 2025	No Strings Attached Redux	Vladimere Lhore	
Haunted PS1 Demo Disc: Flipside Frights; Original Release date: 11 January 2025	No Players Online	BEESWAX GAMES	Successor released on Steam (official Steam page) on November 6, 2025.
Haunted PS1 Demo Disc: Flipside Frights; Original Release date: 11 January 2025	Sorrow	Kris Lee	
Haunted PS1 Demo Disc: Flipside Frights; Original Release date: 11 January 2025	Spyrit Walker	Rexoto Games	
Haunted PS1 Demo Disc: Flipside Frights; Original Release date: 11 January 2025	Subversive Memories	Southward Studio	
Haunted PS1 Demo Disc: Flipside Frights; Original Release date: 11 January 2025	500 Caliber Contractz	Bryce Bucher	
Haunted PS1 Demo Disc: Flipside Frights; Original Release date: 11 January 2025	Aether Singularity	Alenar Soft	
Haunted PS1 Demo Disc: Flipside Frights; Original Release date: 11 January 2025	Angeline Era	Analgesic Productions	Full version released on 8 December 2025.
Haunted PS1 Demo Disc: Flipside Frights; Original Release date: 11 January 2025	Axyz	Lion Studios	
Haunted PS1 Demo Disc: Flipside Frights; Original Release date: 11 January 2025	Children Of Saturn	Boie and Shoray	
Haunted PS1 Demo Disc: Flipside Frights; Original Release date: 11 January 2025	Forklift Flowerpot	Too Much Tomato	
Haunted PS1 Demo Disc: Flipside Frights; Original Release date: 11 January 2025	Last Time I Saw You	Maboroshi Artworks	
Haunted PS1 Demo Disc: Flipside Frights; Original Release date: 11 January 2025	Prison Of Husks	Hexosphere	
Haunted PS1 Demo Disc: Flipside Frights; Original Release date: 11 January 2025	Scissors In Hell	Z. Bill	
Haunted PS1 Demo Disc: Flipside Frights; Original Release date: 11 January 2025	Ticky's Tower Of Time	Pizza Dev	
Haunted PS1 Demo Disc: Flipside Frights; Original Release date: 11 January 2025	Toree Saturn	Siactro	Full version released on 8 August 2025.
Haunted PS1 Demo Disc: Flipside Frights; Original Release date: 11 January 2025	Trip	Bastien Mahaut (BASTINUS REX)	

== See also ==
- Haunted PS1
