= No Players Online =

Online horror and alternate reality game

- Developers: Adam Pype; Tibau Van den Broeck
- Composer: Viktor Kraus
- Platforms: Microsoft Windows, Linux
- Release: November 2019 (original) / November 2025 (successor)
- Genres: Indie game; short horror game

No Players Online is a horror game released on Itch.io, a website for indie games, and Steam. It was created by Belgian game developers Adam Pype, Tibau Van den Broeck and German sound designer Viktor Kraus in November 2025.

No Players Online was originally released on November 6, 2019, (now referred to as No Players Online Classic) as part of a Haunted PS1 Jam by Pype, with sound design by Kraus and additional art by Ward D'Heer. Initially intended to be a twenty-minute horror game, the developer continued to expand the game into an alternate reality game (ARG) involving cryptic messages and secret passcodes. Players quickly solved the ARG on a dedicated Discord server.

No Players Online received positive reviews from critics, who praised the atmosphere, horror, and PS1-reminiscent graphics. Outlets such as Bloody Disgusting and The Verge praised the short length of the game and the nostalgia it evoked.

== Plot ==
In No Players Online Classic, a VHS tape titled "Capture the Flag Project" appears on the player's desktop. Clicking on the tape brings up a menu screen similar to an MS-DOS, and a selection of empty multiplayer servers. Each server is a capture-the-flag game of a first-person shooter (FPS) with PS1-style graphics. After capturing the first flag, a record player begins to play, and an aggressive, shadowy figure begins to appear throughout the map.

Before the player can capture the final flag, John, the developer of the game, appears in chat, revealing that the game is an attempt to resurrect his dead wife, the shadowy figure who is stuck in a state of limbo, and that he has been working on the game for eleven years. He pleads with the player not to finish the game, as it would shut down the servers and destroy his work. The player can either leave the game or finish it, after which they will be kicked out. The main game takes around fifteen to twenty minutes to complete.

== Development ==
No Players Online Classic was created by developer Adam Pype, a student at the Digital Arts and Entertainment game school of Hogeschool West-Vlaanderen (HOWEST) in Belgium. Viktor Kraus served as sound designer. The game was developed for the Haunted PS1 Jam, a game jam where entries must be horror games with PS1-style graphics. Pype, whose online username is "papercookies", was inspired to develop the game during a level design course, where he walked around his empty maps. He believed that the atmosphere and inherent fear of empty games would be a good premise for a horror game. No Players Online took the developers four days to complete, and it was released on Itch.io in November 2019 for free. It was part of Pype's commitment to release one game every month.

== Alternate reality game ==
As an easter egg, Pype added an additional line if the player manages to replay the game, typically through entering the Konami Code. When players found the easter egg and wondered if there was more to the game, the developers gradually built an alternate reality game (ARG) around it over six days. A community formed around No Players Online and a Discord server dedicated to solving the ARG was created. Clues were compiled through a series of Google Docs.

Players discovered they could make an eye appear in the sky, which, when fired upon, brought up a video of arrows being drawn. After entering the arrow keys in the video, an image with a date appeared on the screen. On this date, John's email was added to the Itch.io game homepage, which generated an autoreply when contacted containing a link to another short horror Itch.io game titled EYE. After finishing EYE, another VHS tape appeared which led to another video. EYE was originally a separate project created by Pype and Belgian university student Ward D'Heer. Other clues involved morse code over a hotline and a large room with walls filled with semi-legible messages, colloquially known as "the dungeon", with a computer screen and keyboard. Entering a passcode enables the player to become a "vessel" for John's wife's spirit.

I think it really captured people's imaginations because it's something you can keep talking about [...] It's a real community event. [W]hat's really interesting for us about the initial reception of the game, is seeing people who could relate to being alone on a server. I think we tapped into this very specific nostalgia that a lot of people have.

— Adam Pype, 2020

The ARG ended after players deciphered a set of coordinates in a Belgian forest; one server member went to the forest and found a poem representing the end of the journey. According to Pype, the ARG was solved very quickly. In an interview with PC Gamer, Pype said that the ARG was made up as it went on. He joined the Discord server before his name was in the credits of the game and assisted with the final portion of the ARG. He also discussed balancing the difficulty of the ARG, noting that some elements were data mined from the game's code by players rather than solved.

== Reception ==
Reviewers highlighted the feeling of nostalgia and the "unnerving" atmosphere of waiting on an empty game server or dead multiplayer game; they praised the game's buildup of tension. (Note: Attributed to multiple sources:) The Verge and Bloody Disgusting praised No Players Online's short length and atmosphere, as well as the sense of unease. Neither review mentioned the ARG. Aaron Boehm of Bloody Disgusting said that the story had a "surprising emotional core" despite believing that the reveal was handled quickly. Boehm added that, although the current game worked, it could be expanded and have a "more patient buildup."

Rock Paper Shotgun and Boehm both felt that, excluding the atmosphere, the horror was inadequate and cliché. They also noted that the framing of the VHS tape juxtaposed with playing the FPS "doesn't quite match with the rest of the game's theme." However, Boehm praised the "lo-fi" aesthetic. The Verge and Rock Paper Shotgun praised the level design as "claustraphobic" and reminiscent of FPSs from the 1990s, but Boehm wished for the level to be expanded. None of these reviews mention the ARG.

Mikhail Klimentov of The Washington Post called the ending to the main game a "fine conclusion" considering its length but thought that, because of the ARG, the story was "dispelled by explanation." Klimentov said that No Players Online was "fuzzy and noncommittal" in conveying the era its aesthetic attempts to evoke. He said the scariest element of the game was the theme of "time slipping through your fingers", that John had worked on the game for eleven years and it was barely finished. Klimentov adds that although the ARG was "fascinating" and admired the effort put into it by both the developers and players, he questioned whether it mattered when most players would miss it. Dread Central's Jesse Grodman noted that he completely missed the game's hidden portions on his first playthrough. He, however, thought that the secret parts were fine as-is, comparing it to the secret ending of Doki Doki Literature Club! (2017).

== Successor ==
In April 2024, Pype announced a "spiritual successor" to No Players Online and released a ninety-minute game demo. Though it bears the same name, the press kit describes it as a longer, completely new game with similar themes of "being alone in a multiplayer game, haunted abandonware, and unearthing occult mysteries hidden within early-internet rabbit holes." The developer, Beeswax Games, consists of Pype, Kraus, and Van den Broeck.

In October 2025, Pype released a new trailer revealing that No Players Online would release on November 6, 2025, exactly six years after the original. The game was released as scheduled on November 6, 2025, through Steam.
