= Murder House (video game) =

- Developer: Puppet Combo
- Publisher: Puppet Combo
- Engine: Unity
- Platforms: Microsoft Windows, PlayStation 4, Xbox One, Nintendo Switch
- Release: October 23, 2020 (PC); October 14, 2021 (consoles)
- Genre: Survival horror
- Mode: Single-player

Murder House is a slasher-inspired survival horror game by Puppet Combo, originally released for Microsoft Windows in October 2020, and later for PlayStation 4, Xbox One and Nintendo Switch in 2021. The game focuses on a news crew arriving at the house of a thought-dead serial killer to film a documentary, only for the killer to re-emerge and hunt them down.

Murder House utilizes low poly dated graphics, tank controls, fixed camera angles, and exploration, primarily as a tribute to classic horror video games. The game received positive reviews from critics.

== Plot ==
In 1985, a young boy named Justin wakes up locked in a mall after closing hours. He explores the mall before being kidnapped by the mall's Easter Bunny.

Three years later, a TV news crew consisting of producer Gary, reporter Dana Turner, cameraman Tom, and intern Emma travel to the abandoned house of the infamous Easter Ripper serial killer to film a documentary on him. The Easter Ripper was a child killer who would kidnap, torture, then kill children; following the escape of one of his victims, the Ripper was unmasked as Anthony Smith, who was later apprehended and given a death sentence.

The house's real estate agent Jerry is a no-show, so the crew enter and begin filming after Emma breaks in and turns on the power. Gary sends Emma to go to town to buy pizzas, but Emma finds their van dismantled and the gate locked. A note left behind says that they will be playing an easter egg hunt, similar to the Ripper's modus operandi. Emma returns and Gary decides to resume filming, however he entrusts her to man the camera after Tom has gone missing. Emma manages to recover Tom, who had been exploring the basement. After they find Jerry's mangled body in the bathroom, the Easter Ripper reveals himself to be alive and brutally murders Dana and Gary. Emma also finds a videotape where she sees the Easter Ripper had also killed Tom.

With the Easter Ripper locking the house, Emma is forced to participate in the egg hunt while evading the Ripper. Upon collecting all four eggs, she escapes through an unlocked exit that leads to the nearby greenhouse, where she is confronted by the Ripper. The Easter Ripper reveals himself to be Tom, who had been the killer the whole time. His brother Anthony took the fall for his crimes, so Tom tried to live a clean life but later succumbed to his murderous tendencies once again. He decided to kill the news crew as revenge for smearing Anthony's name. Emma manages to retrieve a shotgun and wound Tom; an earthquake occurs and Tom's victims buried in the greenhouse are resurrected, showing rabies-like symptoms. They swarm and devour Tom within seconds. As Emma flees, an abnormal light emits from the greenhouse.

In the "uncut" ending, the story is revealed to be a horror movie that has concluded filming. The crew and Emma's actor, Sarah, are displeased with the film, particularly the ending. The film's director notes that the Ripper's actor, Nick, skipped town before they wrapped filming, leading for Tom's actor Devante to take over. Sarah and Gary's actor Dan mention that the house is rumored to have been the site of real child killings. A crew member shares that Nick had been acting strange during filming, while Sarah observes that one Ripper costume is missing. Sarah decides to skip the film's wrap party and go home early, but as she leaves the house in her car, a man inside a bloodied Easter Ripper costume is hidden in her trunk.

== Gameplay ==
The game features tank controls to move the player character and uses fixed camera angles by default, although there is also an option to play in first-person. As they explore the game, players can find items which can progress the plot such as keys and weapons, as well as pencils which are used to save the game. They can also travel between rooms through doors that open in a cutscene amidst a black background, similarly to doors in Resident Evil. According to Kotaku, the visuals of the game are "purposefully dated" as well as "dark and fuzzy"; players are also given the option of applying filters to the graphics...

== Development and release ==
Murder House was Puppet Combo's followup to their previous game Babysitter Bloodbath, being the game's "spiritual successor" according to Bloody Disgusting. It drew inspiration from the low poly graphics of original PlayStation-era video games and 1980s slasher films released on VHS for its aesthetic presentation. It also features music that is inspired by 1980s horror synth music. Specific influences on the game include Resident Evil and Silent Hill.

It was released on PC via Steam on October 23, 2020, and later to PlayStation 4, Xbox One and Nintendo Switch on October 14, 2021. Upon release, the game was banned from the Switch's eShop in Japan. Additional post-release content including the game's soundtrack and a post-credits scene has also been made available.

== Reception ==
Reception

Review score
Publication	Score
Nintendo World Report	7.5/10

Mike Fahey of Kotaku felt that the low poly graphics, camera angles, "eerie" music, and "frustratingly imprecise" controls which "[add] the perfect degree of panic" furthered the horror of the game's atmosphere. He concluded that the game succeeded in creating a "classic creepy vibe that's almost timeless". Colin Henderson of Horror Obsessive similarly argued that the game's "clumsy and imprecise" controls "[add] to the intensity when the action kicks in". He said of the game that it was a refinement over Babysitter Bloodbath and that its "exceptional" sound design as well as purposefully rough graphics made the game even scarier. He said that the main "sticking point" of the game was its $12 price point compared to its short runtime which he called "pretty steep" but he felt that it was worth it overall. He concluded "Murder House is a rather brief, but oh-so-sweet love letter to a bygone era, and it manages to overcome the flaws of the sub-genre its aping by being legitimately scary."

Reviewing the Switch version of the game for Nintendo World Report, Joe DeVader found the tank controls to be "unruly" when using the Switch Pro Controller's D-pad but felt that they mostly worked well with the game's fixed camera angles, excluding "moments where the camera just sort of felt like it had decided not to follow [him]". He described how during his playthrough of the game, a "major issue" occurred three times in the form of the game crashing when he attempted to load save data. However, he felt that these issues were alleviated by the game's short runtime and praised the game's "campy plot", "fantastic atmosphere and aesthetic", and sound design. Overall he rated the game 7.5 out of 10, concluding that it was "good but technically troubled". The Switch version's icon, which consists of a close-up image of the Easter Ripper's bunny mask, was noted by some fans and critics to be "creepy" in a way that contrasted with the generally colorful icons of other Switch games. Some fans received this aspect of the game negatively, although Jordan Devore of Destructoid described it as "striking", saying that he "wouldn't want it to change", and Mike Fahey of Kotaku argued that "If any game needs a fucked-up-looking icon, it's this one".

Neil Bolt included the game on his list of the 10 best horror games of 2020 for Bloody Disgusting, praising the game's tank controls and calling it "a tense, violent struggle to survive". Alex Van Aken streamed his playthrough of the game for Game Informer's Replay series, calling it "one of the most intriguing indie horror games of 2020".
