= Heartworm (disambiguation) =

Dirofilaria immitis, also known as heartworm, is a parasite. Heartworm or heartworms may also refer to:

- Heartworm (album), 1995 album by Whipping Boy
- Heartworms (album), 2017 album by the Shins
- Heartworm Press, publishing house run by Wesley Eisold
- Heartworm (video game), 2025
- Heartworms (musician), a London-based musician

== See also ==
- Heartwork (disambiguation)
