= 10 Dead Doves =

Horror video game

- Developer: Duonix Studios
- Publisher: Duonix Studios
- Designers: Mark Byram II; Sean-Michael Millard
- Writer: Mark Byram II
- Composer: Daniel Millard
- Engine: Unreal Engine 4
- Platform: Windows
- Release: December 13, 2024
- Genres: Horror, adventure
- Mode: Single-player

10 Dead Doves is a 2024 psychological horror adventure game developed and published by Duonix Studios for Windows. The player must explore environments and converse with characters and examine, collect, and use objects to solve puzzles, while avoiding monsters.

== Plot ==
Set in 2004, 10 Dead Doves puts the player in the role of Mark Stetson, a disgruntled, terminally ill hiker travelling through the Appalachian Mountains in search of an urban legend named the Ant Farm. Assisted by his friend, a trail angel named Sean Russell, Mark is led to believe the Ant Farm is a mythic structure that will make his dreams come true. While exploring, Mark suffers from episodes of narcoleptic cataplexy that worsen the closer he gets to the Ant Farm, and begins to receive cryptic prophetic dreams from a bird-like poet named the Wren.

== Gameplay ==
10 Dead Doves is a horror adventure game, in which the player controls Mark as he follows Sean through the Appalachian Mountains. The game is presented primarily through fixed-perspective camera angles, with gameplay involving exploration, environmental storytelling, and puzzle-based progression. The game intermittently features segments called Dove Dreams, which are surrealist episodes triggered by Mark's narcolepsy. In these, the player is thrust into story vignettes, usually providing non-chronological fragmented narrative elements. The player's choices within the Dove Dreams control a scale that impacts the ending.

10 Dead Doves draws inspiration from Appalachian folklore and surrealist horror, and features a nonlinear narrative and fixed-perspective camera design. Certain levels of 10 Dead Doves contain gameplay styles different to the base game, such as a third-person over-the-shoulder camera, or a first-person horror segment like Slender: The Eight Pages.

== Development ==
Development of 10 Dead Doves began in January 2021 as a collaboration between Nashville, Tennessee-based artist Mark Byram II and brothers Daniel and Sean-Michael Millard. The game was funded via a successful Kickstarter campaign after the game's demo was featured in the Haunted PS1 Demo Disc: Spectral Mall, an indie horror game compilation inspired by low poly video games. The game features voice acting, names, and likenesses from the game's creators, and includes a stop motion-like effect on its characters' faces, created through a system of photo references and texture coordinate scrolling. The developers cited influences such as Dante's Inferno, Twin Peaks, and House of Leaves, films such as Stalker and Synecdoche, New York, as well as psychological horror game series like Silent Hill and Resident Evil as major inspirations for 10 Dead Doves.

== Reception ==
Adventure Game Hotspot critiqued the game's unconventional narrative structure and clunky tank controls. In 2025, 10 Dead Doves was nominated for Best Narrative at the Horror Game Awards, losing to Silent Hill f.
