= Puppet Combo =

American video game developer

- Formerly: Pig Farmer Games
- Industry: Video games
- Founded: 2012; 14 years ago
- Founder: Benedetto "Ben" Cocuzza
- Headquarters: New York City, U.S.
- Website: puppetcombo.com

Puppet Combo is an American independent video game development studio founded by Benedetto "Ben" Cocuzza in 2012 and based in Brooklyn. It is operated solely by Cocuzza. Puppet Combo's games, such as Nun Massacre (2018) and the critically acclaimed Murder House (2020), are mostly survival horror games developed solely by Cocuzza and modeled after early PlayStation games and VHS. They are also frequently inspired by 1980s horror films, specifically exploitation and slasher films. Puppet Combo primarily releases their games through Patreon and Itch.io. Cocuzza launched Torture Star Video, a video game publisher for lo-fi horror games, in 2021.

== History ==
=== Developing ===
Puppet Combo was founded in 2012 by Benedetto "Ben" Cocuzza in Brooklyn as Pig Farmer Games. Cocuzza began developing games in 2000 and, inspired by his desire to adapt a slasher film into a video game, he later learned how to develop survival horror games. His games became known for their PS1–based graphics, graphic violence, jump scares, and inspiration from 1980s "video nasties"; he and Kitty Horrorshow are considered progenitors of the wave of independent PS1–style horror games that followed in the 2010s and 2020s.

In 2012, Pig Farmer Games began developing Sanitarium Massacre, a stealth horror game in which the player controls a serial killer named Neokalus Burr who goes on a killing spree throughout a sanitarium in 1978, with a soundtrack produced by Cocuzza in Ableton Live. It was scheduled to be released the following year, but it was later scrapped, and assets from it were used to make Halloween, which Cocuzza developed using software taken from a Friday the 13th fangame made by Microstuff Studios. Halloween was a survival horror game heavily inspired by the 1978 film of the same name and released as freeware in October 2013. The game was briefly taken down due to copyright infringement and re-released as Babysitter Bloodbath in December 2013. It focuses on a teenage girl named Sarah who is chased by a serial killer while babysitting; it uses tank controls and can be viewed in third-person or first-person. Its intentionally haphazard shooting controls and Sarah's moon-shaped head were inspired by the 1999 horror video game Silent Hill.

The low poly, exploitation-influenced slasher game Power Drill Massacre was developed by Puppet Combo using Unity and released for PC in 2015. It has four texture packs, and its plot, which was inspired by the 1974 film The Texas Chain Saw Massacre, focuses on a young woman who goes into an abandoned factory in the woods, where she is chased by a murderer. Luke Winkie of Vulture called the game "a pure slasher pastiche that somehow manages to squeeze out the most intense jump scares on the market", while Kill Screen wrote that it was "capable of a genuine and sudden fright" and "a thrill that not many horror games are able to reach". Puppet Combo launched a Patreon account in 2017 through which to release their games.

In 2018, Puppet Combo developed and released Nun Massacre, a 32-bit stealth survival horror game in which the protagonist, Mrs. McDonnell, must escape from a run-down Catholic boarding school and avoid a knife-wielding killer nun, all while figuring out the mystery of the school. It has options to make its graphics resemble cathode-ray tube televisions and VHS tracking; Zoey Handley of Destructoid praised it as "a PS1 game that didn't exist but would have been awesome if it did". Nun Massacre was released for PlayStation 4, PlayStation 5, Nintendo Switch, and iOS in March 2022, when a difficulty option was added to the game. The game received mostly positive reviews from critics. Feed Me, Billy!, a psychological horror game about a serial killer who must feed the hole in his closet with the bodies of his victims, was released by Puppet Combo later that year through Patreon. Vice's Michael Siebert deemed its gameplay "psychologically disturbed", "simple", and "repetitive", with mechanics that "belie a dreary and upsetting world", and Lewis Gordon of The Verge called it "gruesome pulp horror". Their game Night Shift was also released in 2018, with a film adaptation of the game directed and written by Cocuzza in post-production as of April 2025 and scheduled to be released in October 2025. In April 2019, Puppet Combo released The Glass Staircase on PC through Itch.io. It is a survival horror game about a group of young women in the early 1900s who are kept in a mysterious treatment facility and was inspired by PlayStation 2 games and Italian horror films.

The survival horror game Murder House was developed by Puppet Combo and released on PC through Steam in 2020. Like many of Puppet Combo's games, it takes inspiration from 1980s horror films, early PlayStation games, and VHS, and follows a news crew as they are hunted down in an abandoned home by the Easter Ripper, a serial killer who wears a rabbit costume and was thought to be dead after being executed three years prior. The game uses tank controls and is viewed from a third-person perspective, though players can choose to play in first-person, and it has a horror synth soundtrack and intentionally low quality sound mixing. Kotaku's Mike Fahey praised Murder House as "old-school nightmare fuel", stating that its "antediluvian 3D visuals" give it a "classic creepy vibe that's almost timeless", while Bloody Disgusting called it "seemingly the gory survival horror crescendo Cucuzza has been building towards" and "such a memorable survival horror ride". The A.V. Club's Alexander Chatziioannou described Murder House as one of "the scariest, most imaginative horror games of 2021"; Kelsey Raynor of VG247 listed Murder House as one of the best horror games of all time in 2021, while Hadley Vincent of Destructoid ranked it as one of the best indie horror games for its "fantastic mix of comedy and frightening scenes". The game also received widespread acclaim from Steam users. In October 2021, it was released for PlayStation 4, Xbox One, and Nintendo Switch. Its Nintendo Switch icon, a close-up image of the Easter Ripper's face, trended on social media after being described by users as disturbing; Puppet Combo refused to change it.

In December 2021, Puppet Combo released the score attack game Christmas Massacre to Steam, in which Larry, a serial killer dressed as Santa Claus, is told by his Christmas tree to kill as many people as possible. Ryan Dinsdale of IGN wrote that it bore resemblance to the 2003 video game Manhunt. On his list of the best horror games of 2021, Neil Bolt of Bloody Disgusting listed Christmas Massacre as an honorable mention. Puppet Combo announced in early November 2023 that a port of the game would be released on the PlayStation 5 later that month, but that its Nintendo Switch and Xbox ports had been barred from release for being "too crazy" for either console. Puppet Combo's stealth horror game Stay Out of the House was released on Steam in October 2022. It follows Roxanne, a store clerk working the night shift who gets kidnapped by the Butcher, a cannibalistic serial killer, and must escape his home while avoiding his grandmother. Handley gave the game a score of 8.5 out of ten, writing that, though it was "more marketable" than other Puppet Combo games, it was also "wonderfully nuanced" with "a cohesive and polished design" and "may be [her] favorite of the Puppet Combo game[s]".

IGN's 2022 list of the best horror games for PC included Puppet Combo's games at number two, while Dwayne Jenkins of Vice called Puppet Combo "one of the greatest things to happen to indie horror games" in 2025. Will Nelson of PCGamesN wrote in 2023 that many of Puppet Combo's games, including Murder House, had become cult classics among horror games. Tomás Esconjaureguy, the developer of the 2022 horror game The Night of the Scissors, stated that Puppet Combo was a major inspiration on him and the game and that the company had "defined a new kind of game genre".

=== Publishing ===
Puppet Combo published the 8-bit horror game Tonight It Follows, developed by Jordan King, under the name Puppet Combo Presents, and released the game through their Patreon in June 2019. In 2021, Puppet Combo launched Torture Star Video, a video game publishing company with a focus on lo-fi horror games. Bloodwash, a giallo- and PlayStation-inspired horror game developed by Henry Hoare and Jordan King, was published by Torture Star Video and released in September 2021. The game revolves around Sara, a young woman who goes to a laundromat to do her laundry while a serial killer of pregnant women, dubbed the Womb Ripper, is on the loose. Survival Horror Downloads named Bloodwash the fifth best horror game of 2021. For PC Gamer, Joseph Knoop gave the game a mixed review, praising its characters and settings but writing that it "walks the line between stylish homage and cliché-ridden romp" and contains "often exploitative" and "problematic" tropes.

Puppet Combo also published Night Signal Entertainment's 2024 game Home Safety Hotline for PlayStation 4, PlayStation 5, Xbox Series, Xbox One, and Nintendo Switch in September 2024. Torture Star Video has additionally published the games Sniper Killer, The Enigma of Salazar House, The Lakeview Cabin Collection, and The Booty Creek Cheek Freak. For Puppet Combo's work as a publisher, Dwayne Jenkins of Vice wrote that the company was "just as important to indie horror games" as "A24 is to indie movies and shows and Devolver Digital is to 'more mainstream' indie games".

== Games ==
| Year | Title | Platform(s) | Notes |
|---|---|---|---|
| 2013 | Babysitter Bloodbath | PC | Originally titled Halloween and released under Pig Farmer Games; title and elements of game changed due to infringing on the copyright of the 1978 horror film Halloween. |
| 2015 | Power Drill Massacre | PC | —N/a |
| 2016 | Meat Cleaver Mutilator | PC | —N/a |
| 2017 | The Night Ripper | PC | —N/a |
| 2018 | Night Shift | PC | —N/a |
| 2018 | Spiders | PC | —N/a |
| 2018 | Feed Me Billy | PC | —N/a |
| 2018 | Nun Massacre | PC, PlayStation 4, PlayStation 5, Nintendo Switch, iOS, Android, Xbox One, Xbox Series X/S | Originally released on PC in 2018; released on all other platforms in 2022. An updated version of the game titled Nun Massacre: Definitive Edition was released in the same year. |
| 2019 | The Glass Staircase | PC | —N/a |
| 2019 | The Riverside Incident | PC | —N/a |
| 2019 | Day Seven | PC | —N/a |
| 2019 | Samhain | PC | —N/a |
| 2019 | Scary Tales Vol. 1 | PC | Compilation of previously released games. |
| 2020 | Night Watch | PC | —N/a |
| 2020 | Murder House | PC, PlayStation 4, PlayStation 5, Xbox One, Xbox Series X/S, Nintendo Switch | Originally released on PC in 2020; released on all other platforms in 2021. |
| 2021 | Christmas Massacre | PC, PlayStation 4, PlayStation 5 | Originally released on PC in 2021; In 2023, the game was released on Playstation and Xbox. |
| 2022 | Stay Out of the House | PC, PlayStation 4, PlayStation 5, Nintendo Switch, iOS, Android, Xbox One, Xbox Series X/S | Originally released on PC through Patreon page in a nearly completed state and it was on Early Access; it was fully updated and released on Steam on October 14, 2022. On June 16, 2023, the game was released on other platforms. |

=== Games published ===
| Year | Title | Developer | Platform(s) | Notes |
|---|---|---|---|---|
| 2019 | Search Party | Lum | PC | —N/a |
| 2019 | Tonight It Follows | Jordan King | PC | —N/a |
| 2019 | These Trees Are Spectral Fingers | kavvkka | PC | —N/a |
| 2020 | Ski Freak | Jordan King | PC | —N/a |
| 2020 | The Summoning | Jordan King | PC | —N/a |
| 2020 | The Enigma of Salazar House | Maldo19 | PC | —N/a |
| 2021 | Bloodwash | Jordan King | PC, PlayStation 4, PlayStation 5, Nintendo Switch, Xbox One, Xbox Series X/S | Originally released on PC; released on all other platforms on October 12, 2022. |
| 2022 | Deadly Night | Cubyte Games | PC | —N/a |
| 2022 | The Booty Creek Cheek Freak | Jordan King | PC | —N/a |
| 2022 | Night at the Gates of Hell | Jordan King | PC, PlayStation 4/5, Nintendo Switch, Xbox One, Xbox Series X/S | Originally released on PC; released on all other platforms on September 8, 2023 |
| 2023 | Rewind or Die | COMP-3 Interactive | PC, Xbox Series X/S | —N/a |
| 2023 | Ding Dong Dead | Jordan King | PC, Xbox Series X/S | —N/a |
| 2023 | No One Lives Under the Lighthouse | Marevo Collective | PC, PlayStation 4/5, Nintendo Switch, Xbox One, Xbox Series X/S | Released independently in 2020; however, it was republished by Torture Star Video on May 18, 2023, for the console release. |
| 2024 | Cannibal Abduction | Selewi | PC, PlayStation 4, PlayStation 5, Nintendo Switch, Xbox One, Xbox Series X/S | Released independently in 2023; however, it was republished by Torture Star Video on February 8, 2024, for the console release. |
| 2024 | The Night of the Scissors | Selewi | PC, PlayStation 4/5, Nintendo Switch, Xbox One, Xbox Series X/S | Released independently in 2022; however, it was republished by Torture Star Video, by being bundled with Cannibal Abduction in its console release on the 8th of February, 2024. |
| 2024 | The Lakeview Cabin Collection | HypnoGames | PC, PlayStation 4/5, Xbox One, Xbox Series X/S | Released independently in 2015; however, it was republished by Torture Star Video, on July 25, 2024. |
| 2024 | Home Safety Hotline | Night Signal Entertainment | PC, PlayStation 4/5, Xbox One, Xbox Series X/S, Nintendo Switch | Released independently in 2024; however, it was republished by Torture Star Video, on September 20, 2024. |
| 2024 | Sniper Killer | Jordan King | PC | —N/a |
| 2025 | SkinFreak | Jordan King | PC | Originally released through a patreon page in a demo; fully finished and released on Steam in October 16, 2025 |
