= Filthbreed =

2019 video game

- itch.io header art
- Developer: Borja Zorozo
- Platform: Windows
- Release: 5 February 2019
- Mode: Single-player

Filthbreed (styled as FILTHBREED) is a 2019 horror video game created by independent developer Borja Zorozo. Described by the developer as a "short horror first-person shooter developed as a student project", Filthbreed was included in the 2020 horror game compilation Haunted PS1 Demo Disc by Irish developer Breogán Hackett.

== Gameplay ==
Screenshot

Filthbreed is an adventure horror game in which the player explores the rumored headquarters of a cult in Michigan as a police officer investigating the disappearance of homeless people in the area. The game features a rudimentary weapons system with a gun to defend against attacks from human-insect hybrid monsters as they explore the area. The player is unable to interact with objects and hold their gun at the same time, requiring them to alternate between mechanics in order to defend themselves. Players are able to investigate their surroundings and discover notes from the prime suspect, a truck driver named Louie Burton, to provide more insight into the history of the disappearances. The game features several endings, with alternate endings if the player decided to leave the building before the conclusion of the game.

== Reception ==
Filthbreed received a positive reception upon its release with the Haunted PS1 Demo Disc, with the game cited by publications as a highlight of the compilation. Writing for DreadXP, Ted Henschke praised the game as his "favorite of the bunch", highlighting the game's elicitation of "primal revulsion" with "every piece tailored to make you as uncomfortable as possible" in a similar manner to the Condemned series of video games. Henschke highlighted the use of the weapon system to create "an extra layer of tension" as "simple but effective", although critiquing the game's short play time and limited content, being "only about ten minutes long" to complete. Catherine Brinegar of RE:BIND praised the game as a "deeply unnerving experience", highlighting its "masterclass of horror sound design" and "dingy rendering of bleak rooms" to "push in a direction that heightens the tension and atmosphere with the slight abstraction of what you're seeing." Calum Fraser of Alpha Beta Gamer praised the game as a "great little horror game that really gets under your skin", highlighting the game's "real sense of dread" and inclusion of "well written notes that really do seem like they were written by a man slipping into madness." Pablo de Quevedo of Gamer Report praised the game as a "tense experience", highlighting its "abundant Lovecraftian touches" in the game's aesthetics and notes. Writing for Rely on Horror, Jordan Leendertsen critiqued the game's "very basic shooting system" and found "the monster design a bit lacking given the interesting premise", although finding the overall game "satisfying enough".
