= A Taste of the Past =

2022 Narrative video game

- Developer: SonderingEmily
- Engine: Unity
- Platforms: Steam; Itch.io
- Release: March 11, 2022
- Genre: Casual game
- Mode: Single-player

A Taste of the Past is a narrative indie cooking game developed by SonderingEmily. It focuses on a young Chinese-American teenage student overcoming loss by cooking her mother's noodle recipe . The game was released on March 11, 2022.

== Premise ==
A Taste of the Past focuses on a young Chinese-American high school student named Mei, where her mother passed away prior. Afterwards, Mei boarded a train holding onto a recipe for noodles which was created by her mother previously. However, she loses them unexpectedly. She then falls asleep and dreams about her ancestors on the same train as her, where she learned about her heritage of her mother and her relationships. After she wakes up, she realizes about her appreciation for her mother, and must find the recipe to make the noodles.

== Background and development ==
Developer SonderingEmily stated that she wanted to tell her personal story through other people, and that it was inspired by stress and trauma. A trailer was then released in October 2021. Emily then began promoting the game via social media, which began to build a mini fan base. The game was released in March 2022 on Steam and Itch.io.
