= Orange County (video game) =

2019 video game

- Title screen for the itch.io version
- Developers: Nicholas Brancaccio, Rachel Hwang, Nick Grayson
- Platform: Windows
- Release: 31 July 2019
- Mode: Single-player

Orange County is a 2019 horror video game developed by pastasfuture, the professional name of independent developer Nicholas Brancaccio. The game is a first-person horror game in which the player avoids traffic whilst riding a skateboard. The game was developed in several months in 2019 for the Haunted PS1 Summer Spooks game jam, hosted by Irish independent developer Breogán Hackett. On 6 February 2020, an update to Orange County was released as part of the horror game compilation Haunted PS1 Demo Disc, also published by Hackett. The game received praise for its unusual fusion of the skateboarding and horror genres.

== Gameplay ==
In-game screenshot

Orange County is a skateboarding game in which the player navigates a procedurally-generated endless landscape by skateboard, avoiding hazards such as traffic and buildings. The player is able to walk or skate at a faster pace, but is vulnerable to falling off if they collide with a hazard. As the game progresses, the density of traffic increases.One of these is a police vehicle that attempts to pursue the player and knock them over. The game is open-ended and the player is left to explore the environment whilst attempting to avoid hazards.

== Reception ==
Orange County received positive attention, with praise directed to its unusual interpretation of the skateboarding game genre. Writing for PC Gamer, Tom Sykes stated "when you're out in the open, skating around the creepily empty streets of what seems to be a futuristic dystopia, Orange County feels pretty great...there's something wonderful to the feeling of skateboarding in first-person." Calum Fraser of Alpha Beta Gamer stated that the initial release of the game was " a very barebones experience, but it's got a great aesthetic and a fun fusion of skateboarding and horror," citing a desire to see more features in the full release of the game. Patricia Hernandez of Polygon cited Orange Country as an example of how the games on the Haunted PS1 Demo Disc were "anything but typical" with "refreshing" takes on genre games. Andrew Murray of Rely on Horror praised the game for its "terrifying atmosphere" and the design of its "sinister and endless landscape".
