= Ode to a Moon =

2022 video game

- Steam artwork
- Developer: Colorfiction
- Platform: Windows
- Release: 4 July 2019 (demo)
- Mode: Single-player

Ode to a Moon is a video game under development by Colorfiction, the professional name of independent developer Max Arocena. Described as a "first-person thriller" with an "exploration focus, light action and puzzle elements", the game is a horror game with surrealistic visuals. Ode to a Moon was released as a demo in 2019 and appeared on the 2020 horror game compilation Haunted PS1 Demo Disc by Irish developer Breogán Hackett.

== Gameplay ==
Screenshot

The player is a photojournalist for a tabloid magazine in the 1980s who is tasked with covering a fall festival in a remote rural town during a lunar eclipse. The game is played as a conventional first-person exploration adventure game, with only minor interface additions such as descriptive dialog when inspecting items with the cursor. The player starts in their apartment and takes a train to explore the town, with the game's environment becoming more surreal from the perception of the player as they venture further within. The game features heavy use of visual filters to distort the perspective and colors in the game.

== Development ==
In an interview with OnlySP, Arocena stated that development of Ode to a Moon was inspired by the desire to create a game that was more linear "explore a narrative grounded on reality for some time". Arocena stated "I want to take inspiration from cinema and explore how narrative shapes space and in turn affects the player as they transverse it,” citing the desire to create an experience of "pure delirium where the protagonist loses touch with reality" as a "continuous juxtaposition of the real and the abstract."

An initial demo of Ode to a Moon was released by Arocena in July 2019, with an unannounced released date. The game purports to be "inspired by actual events and the general belief that truth is stranger than fiction," with Arocena posting unusual and surrealistic sites in the New England area on his Twitter account to support the release. Development of the full game is intended to have a stronger emphasis on horror, although without "monsters or enacted violence." A trailer for the game was released December 2019 featuring additional features, including spikes emerging from the town's walls and shadowy figures appearing.

Development of Ode to a Moon is currently on hiatus, with Arocena stating that work on the game is currently discontinued whilst funding is secured for another project.

== Reception ==
Reception of the demo version of Ode to a Moon was positive, with critics praising the surrealistic and dreamlike presentation of the game. Writing for Rock Paper Shotgun, Matt Cox praised the "uncannily psychedelic" presentation of the game, stating the game was a "successful reflection of what psychedelics can do to visual perception." Danielle Riendau of Fanbyte described Ode to a Moon as "an awesome short-form horror game that traded on surreal imagery and jump cuts," praising the "oddly gorgeous atmosphere." KJ Robertson of Alpha Beta Gamer stated the game was "very impressive...with a great sense of atmosphere and a very cool neon-filled 80’s visual style." Jody Macgregor of PC Gamer was more muted in her praise, noting that the game's presentation of VHS scanlines "liberally overlaid everywhere" was ambiguous in its purpose, and acknowledging that the game was a demo and "more of a mood piece than anything."

Ode to a Moon received further attention following the streaming of the game by Jacksepticeye on 9 July 2019 and Markiplier on 19 July 2019.
