= Sauna2000 =

Upcoming video game

- itch.io version cover image
- Developer: 靄 Moya Horror
- Composers: Amos Sorri; Nikke Kuki
- Platform: Windows
- Genres: Simulation, horror
- Mode: Single-player

Sauna2000 is a video game under development by 靄 Moya Horror, the production team of Japan-based independent developer Amos Sorri. Described as a "comedic sauna simulator", Sauna2000 is a horror game with a Finnish setting. A demo of the game was included in the 2020 horror game compilation Haunted PS1 Demo Disc by Irish developer Breogán Hackett, prompting the launch of a successful Kickstarter campaign. The game was praised for its unusual setting and light-hearted tone, particularly by Finnish critics.

== Gameplay ==
Gameplay screenshot, with Erkki standing on the sauna deck

Set in the summer of 2000 in the small Finnish lakeside town of Muhvijärvi, the player controls Jaska, a Finnish man determined to enjoy a sauna and a cold beer. However, after crashing his car into a moose and finding his summer cabin robbed, it is up to Jaska to undertake a series of tasks to restore and set up the sauna. Players can also complete other activities, including drinking, shooting, fishing, taking photographs of the scenery, and interacting with characters such as Jaska's Pasanen-like friend Erkki. However, players are required to complete tasks before sundown, before they are visited by a piru of Tuonela that will chase and strike down the player.

== Development ==
Sauna2000 was developed by Amos Sorri, a Finnish developer based in Tokyo. Sorri was inspired to create the game after playing Control, a 2019 video game by Finnish developer Remedy Entertainment that features an inaccessible sauna. Sorri developed the game in a short timeframe of one and a half months, having been given the deadline by Haunted PS1 to include the game in the Demo Disc compilation. Following inclusion in the 2020 Demo Disc, Sorri launched a successful Kickstarter campaign on 23 June 2020 that reached its funding milestone the following month.

== Reception ==
The demo of Sauna2000 received positive reception. Calum Fraser of Alpha Beta Gamer praised the game for its unusually bright horror tone, stating "it's a fantastic game with a very unique setting and vibrant visuals that prove that you don't need darkness and dimly lit corridors to scare people." The game was particularly popular with Finnish critics, who compared the game favorably to My Summer Car, a game with a similarly humorous interpretation of Finnish life. Samuli Leppälä of Iltalehti stated the demo "combines horror, humor and the beauty of a Finnish summer night into a psychedelic package". In September 2022, Sorri released a second demo, Sauna2000 Autumn Night Prelude, described as a "standalone experience that serves as an introduction to the full game", with new and separate content different to the original demo. The second demo is included in the 2022 Haunted PS1 Demo Disc: Spectral Mall compilation.
