= Caitlin Roper =

Australian feminist activist

Caitlin Roper is an Australian feminist activist. She has campaigned against the depiction of violence against women in video games and music, and argued for the prohibition of sex dolls. Roper has also advocated against pornography and criticized the sex-positive views of the topic.

Roper is the campaign manager of Collective Shout and author of Sex Dolls, Robots and Woman Hating: The Case for Resistance (2022).

== History ==
Roper has campaigned for banning Grand Theft Auto V in Australia for, she stated, normalizing violence against women. In 2014, an anonymous internet user created a social media account that impersonated hers and published offensive content under it. Another account impersonating her was created in 2015. An investigation by The Saturday Paper's Martin McKenzie-Murray found that the person who impersonated her account in 2014 was an American young man. Roper told the newspaper that "given the nature of my work, I'm somewhat used to abuse and threats from men online".

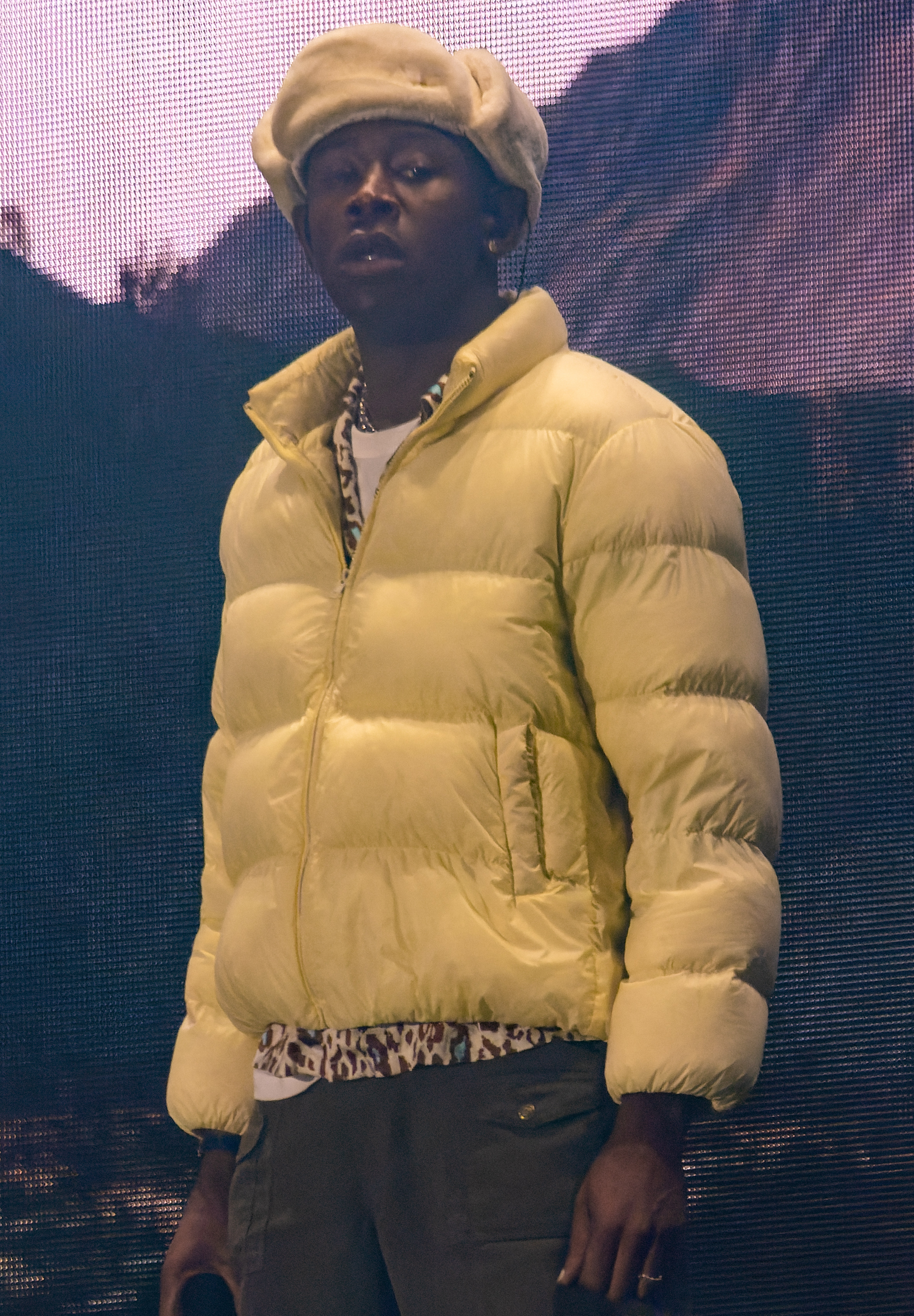
Tyler during a 2022 performance

As campaign manager of Collective Shout, she appealed for the Australian Immigration Minister to get American rapper Tyler, the Creator's Australian visa denied because, she stated, he had written "music describing raping women, mutilating their bodies" and making songs that "rely on the exploitation of women to generate profits". She wrote in 2015 that "Tyler the Creator was not the first artist we targeted and he will not be the last" and cited the group's previous activism against other artists such as Robin Thicke, Brian McFadden and Redfoo. Tyler was ultimately banned from the country due to the content of his lyrics, he later characterized the country's visa policies as racist for having banned black musicians from entering while allowing in other white artists who had written similar songs.

Roper campaigned in 2025 to pressure payment processors to get hundreds of games containing mature and sexual themes banned on Steam and Itch.io. She said that she had identified about 500 titles that contain themes related to rape and incest. As a result of the campaign, thousands of games were banned from the platforms. The campaign was criticized as excessive by the International Game Developers Association and media researcher Brendan Keogh, both of whom stated that the resulting censorship would disproportionately impact sexual, gender and racial minorities. Keogh said that the campaign, which he said relied on showcasing extreme examples in order to gain public support, shared similarities with a moral panic. A petition against the censorship of such games gathered 200,000 signatures and was supported by Elon Musk.

Roper is the author of Sex Dolls, Robots and Woman Hating: The Case for Resistance (2022). In the book, she argues against the dominant sex-positive view of pornography, stating that sex dolls are harmful to women and girls and that they "facilitate a form of pornography male users can actively participate in, an embodied experience where they themselves can be both actors and pornographers".
