= Chasing Static =

2021 video game

- Steam header art
- Developer: Headware Games
- Publisher: Ratalaika Games
- Platforms: Windows; PlayStation 4 PlayStation 5 Xbox One; Xbox Series X/S; Nintendo Switch
- Release: Windows; 14 October 2021; Console; 12 January 2023
- Genre: Adventure
- Mode: Single-player

Chasing Static is a video game released by Headware Games, the studio of independent developer Nathan Hamley. Described as a "psychological horror short story", the game is an exploration-based horror adventure game set in an open-ended Welsh countryside. A demo of the game was released as part of the 2021 horror game compilation Haunted PS1 Demo Disc, curated by independent developer Breogán Hackett. Chasing Static received a mixed reception from reviewers, with praise directed to the game's presentation, writing and atmosphere, and criticism of its short length and ending. In January 2023, the game was ported by publisher Ratalaika Games to consoles.

== Gameplay ==
Gameplay screenshot

Chasing Static is an adventure game in which the player controls Chris Selwood in first person, and progresses through open-ended exploration of the game world to discover items and solve inventory-based puzzles. The game lacks conventional mechanics including combat or failure states including death, although the player can be chased by a mysterious entity. The gameplay makes use of a 'Frequency Displacement Monitoring Device' to perform what Hamley describes as 'sonic exploration', allowing the player to change the frequencies of a radio device to locate areas known as 'echoes' that provide the player with knowledge to solve puzzles and discover new information.

== Plot ==
Chris Selwood, on his way back home from his father's funeral in Northern Wales, decides to stop at a roadside cafe, but passes out after witnessing disturbing visions when the power to the cafe goes out. Waking to find the cafe deserted, Chris explores the surroundings of the local town, Hearth, to find answers about the fate of the village, himself, his father's past, and the presence of the nearby Echo Garden Facility. Finding a radio device named a 'Frequency Displacement Monitoring Device', he is assisted by Helen, a surviving researcher, who instructs him of the existence of a reality-distorting event.

== Development and release ==
Hamley, the head of Bristol-based studio Headware Games, developed Chasing Static over the course of one year from January 2020 to the release of a demo as part of the 2021 Haunted PS1 Demo Disc, a compilation series of independent horror game demos by Breogán Hackett influenced by the aesthetic of the PlayStation. Hamley stated he was influenced by the era of horror games on the PlayStation, and that the game was an "attempt to pay homage to those classics and that visual style." The game's setting of Wales was inspired by a Hamley's experiences camping in Snowdonia in Northern Wales prior to development, in which he became lost during a storm. The demo received praise, with William Worrall of TechRaptor stating the demo was the "pick of the disc", and Aaron Boehm of Bloody Disgusting finding the game to be "one of the most polished experiences in this collection." Chasing Static received a multiplatform release for consoles in January 2023, with the game released for Xbox One, Xbox Series, PlayStation 4, PlayStation 5 and Nintendo Switch consoles in collaboration with publisher Ratalaika Games.

== Reception ==
Chasing Static received mixed reviews from publications, with positive reviews highlighting the game's presentation, writing and atmosphere. Writing for Horror Obsessive, Lor Gislason praised the game as "extremely polished", noting the sound design and atmosphere of the game "set the mood wonderfully" and highlighted the "mysterious, X-Files quality to the story". Lauren Morton of Rock Paper Shotgun praised the game's "fun lo-fi look" and "classic horror puzzling", comparing the game to Resident Evil. Jans Holstrom of Dread XP praised the game for its "great writing", "multi-layered and complex" story and "excellent voice cast", highlighting the "atmosphere of dread" in the game with minimal use of jump scares. Sean Davies of Finger Guns wrote the game was a "compact narrative thriller" with "high quality audio" and a "great script", with a story "worth seeing through to the end".

Negative reviews of Chasing Static critiqued the short playtime, ending, and limited scope of the game. Taylor Levesque of SUPERJUMP wrote that the game was "extremely short, even being padded with unskippable cutscenes and no real sense of direction". Similarly, Will Aickman critiqued the "vague and directionless" presentation of the game, writing that "the story feels less like a complete narrative (and) more like a skeletal frame" and noting "there's little direction or fleshed-out larger context". Whilst Kyle Caldwell of PixelDie wrote that "Chasing Static is short and never really overstays its welcome", he observed that the game's ending "falls flat" and "comes out of nowhere and seems thrown together at the last minute". Describing Chasing Static as "a title constantly working against itself", Save or Quit critiqued the game's ending as an "anticlimactic experience" that "completely killed the atmosphere" and "tore away the psychological horror".
