= Janitor Bleeds =

2022 video game

- Steam cover art
- Developer(s): Korpus
- Publisher(s): Bonus Stage Publishing
- Engine: Unity
- Platform(s): Windows, Xbox One
- Release: 7 April 2022
- Genre(s): Adventure
- Mode(s): Single-player

Janitor Bleeds is an adventure game developed by Finnish developer Korpus. Described as "inspired by the video games of the 90s", Janitor Bleeds is a horror game set in a "mysterious arcade". An initial version of the game was included in the horror game compilation Haunted PS1 Demo Disc by Irish developer Breogán Hackett in 2021. On 7 April 2022, a full version of the game was published by Bonus Stage Publishing for Steam and the Xbox Games Store. The full version of the game received mixed reviews, with reviewers praising the setting and atmosphere of the game, whilst critiquing the lack of storyline and detail to the game's design.

== Gameplay ==
The JANITOR arcade game

Janitor Bleeds is an exploration horror game in which the player is trapped in an abandoned arcade after becoming stranded in a car accident. One of the arcade cabinets, titled JANITOR, contains a playable arcade puzzle video game, which provides the player with items that allow them to progress in their exploration of the arcade, such as tools to open up new areas. Each attempt of JANITOR requires tokens, which can be found throughout the arcade. During play, the player is stalked by a monster named The Entity, requiring the player to alternate between hiding, exploring, and playing the arcade game to progress. Proximity to the Entity creates visual effects, with the game ending if it is able to catch the player. The game features two endings depending on the player's actions when defeating the Entity at the end of the game.

== Reception ==
Janitor Bleeds received "mixed or average reviews", according to review aggregator Metacritic, with an average rating of 60% across four reviews. Positive reviews of the game focused upon the setting and atmosphere of the game. Writing for Hey Poor Player, Cory Clark praised the game for its "well-executed main concept of having to play an arcade game while stalked by a mysterious entity", highlighting the game for its nostalgic presentation and setting. Lor Gisalon of Horror Obsessive agreed, stating "the overall atmosphere is the perfect level of creepy" and "fits the theme well". Shaun Prescott of PC Gamer stated the "art style and environment design is really appealing".

Evaluation of the gameplay and level of detail in the game was mixed. In a negative review for Destructoid, Zoey Handley critiqued the game as "mediocre" and a "linear experience", stating that she found the game ineffective "in building atmosphere, tension, or its narrative", stating that "greater attention to the backstory would have gone a long way to making the arcade a terrifying place to be." Handley cited the lack of ingame motivation for the player to explore the arcade as an example of the game's lack of attention to detail. Victor Tan of Keen Gamer similarly agreed that the game featured "graphical issues" and a "weak story", citing the lack of "justification for doing most actions other than progressing the game". However, Cory Clark of Hey Poor Player stated that the simplicity of the game's was a "significant strength", stating the game "doesn't try to overcomplicate itself" and "delivers on its main concept".
