= Siactro =

German video game designer

Marcus Horn
- Other name: Siactro
- Occupation: Independent video game developer
- Years active: 2011–present
- Notable work: Toree 3D, Super Kiwi 64 and Macbat 64
- Website: https://siactro.itch.io/

Siactro is the studio and mononym of German independent video game developer Marcus Horn. Horn's work, including games such as Toree 3D, Super Kiwi 64 and Macbat 64, imitate early 3D platformers on consoles including the Nintendo 64, and have received praise for their visual presentation and design. Horn's games have been released in compilations for the Nintendo Switch and Xbox, and featured in the 2020 and 2021 horror game compilations Haunted PS1 Demo Disc by Irish developer Breogán Hackett.

== Career ==
Horn began his early career developing fangames using the RPG Maker platform and developing short games for game jams including the Global Game Jam, citing these experiences as "important" to his progress to becoming an independent developer. Horn independently develops and self-publishes his games under the name Siactro, working on titles during weekends as "passion projects". He has expressed a preference for developing what he titles as "snack games", being short, simple and inexpensive games that are enjoyable to play. Horn has stated the visual presentation and design of his games draw inspiration from 3D platformers from the 1990s, with his first game, Kiwi 64, created to "pay tribute" to Rare Nintendo 64 games such as Banjo-Kazooie. Horn cites the decision to pursue this style arose from the desire to capture the "specific feeling" of these games, citing the "unpolished charm" and "experimental" design of platformers from this era.

Horn's games are published independently, but have been compiled for several console releases for the Nintendo Switch and Xbox. In July 2022, Diplodocus Games published a compilation of four titles by Siactro named Toree's 3D Platformer Collection, including Toree 3D, Toree 2, Macbat 64 and Regina & Mac. In January 2023, publisher Leoful released Toree 3D for the Nintendo Switch as part of the compilation Super Retro Platformer Collection, alongside Siactro's other titles Regina & Mac and Macbat 64.

=== Acclaim ===
Horn's games have received praise from several outlets for their evocation of early 3D platformers, and associated with the revival of those games by independent developers. Dale Bashir of IGN cited the Toree series as a "must-play" indie platformer, stating the games "have a lot to offer" and were a "complete homage to PlayStation era platforming." Similarly, Giant Bomb praised Siactro's body of work for being "adept at invoking the aesthetic and gameplay of their chosen source material", stating the games "do a fine job crystallizing the essence of what the gaming scene was like at the turn of the millennium by nailing their look and feel".

== Works ==
Under the name Siactro, Horn has self-published several independent games, listed below:

| Year | Title | Release date | Notes |
|---|---|---|---|
| 2014 | Kiwi 64 | 30 December 2014 | Included as an unlockable in Macbat 64. |
| 2015 | Macbat 64 | 3 July 2015 | Included in the compilations Toree's 3D Platformer Collection published by Diplodocus Games in 2022 for Xbox, the Super Retro Platformer Collection published by Leoful in 2023 for the Nintendo Switch, and Toree & Friends Collection published by Super Rare Games in 2026 for the Nintendo Switch. |
| 2016 | Silver Trigger 64 | 21 August 2016 | |
| 2019 | Tasty Ramen | 15 December 2019 | Featured in the Haunted PS1 Demo Disc horror game compilation in February 2020. |
| 2020 | Hungry Ducks | 31 August 2020 | |
| 2021 | Toree 3D | 16 March 2021 | Featured in the Haunted PS1 Demo Disc horror game compilation in March 2021. Included in the compilations Toree's 3D Platformer Collection published by Diplodocus Games in 2022 for Xbox, the Super Retro Platformer Collection published by Leoful in 2023 for the Nintendo Switch, and Toree & Friends Collection published by Super Rare Games in 2026 for the Nintendo Switch. |
| 2021 | Toree 2 | 30 September 2021 | Included in the compilations Toree's 3D Platformer Collection published by Diplodocus Games in 2022 for Xbox and Toree & Friends Collection published by Super Rare Games in 2026 for the Nintendo Switch. |
| 2021 | Toree 3D Jumbled Jam | 15 October 2021 | Included as part of the console release of Toree 3D. |
| 2022 | Toree Genesis | 23 June 2022 | |
| 2022 | Beeny | 14 October 2022 | Included in the compilation Toree & Friends Collection published by Super Rare Games in 2026 for the Nintendo Switch. |
| 2022 | Super Kiwi 64 | 3 December 2022 | Included in the compilation Toree & Friends Collection published by Super Rare Games in 2026 for the Nintendo Switch. |
| 2024 | Toree's Panic Pack | 19 July 2024 | Includes the previously mentioned Toree Genesis, alongside two additional games (Toree Jumbled Jam 2 and Toree Missions). Included in the compilation Toree & Friends Collection published by Super Rare Games in 2026 for the Nintendo Switch. |
| 2025 | Toree Saturn | 8 August 2025 | Included in the compilation Toree & Friends Collection published by Super Rare Games in 2026 for the Nintendo Switch. |
| 2025 | Dead Sight | 30 October 2025 | |
