= Heartwork (disambiguation) =

Heartwork is a 1993 album by Carcass.

Heartwork may also refer to:

- Heartwork (The Used album), 2020

== See also ==
- Heartworm (disambiguation)
