= Collective Shout =

Australian activist group

- Formation: 2009; 17 years ago
- Founder: Melinda Tankard Reist
- Professional title: Collective Shout Limited
- Location: Sydney, New South Wales, Australia
- Methods: Lobbying, petition
- Director: Melinda Tankard Reist
- Campaigns Manager: Caitlin Roper
- Website: www.collectiveshout.org

Collective Shout is an Australian activist group founded in 2009 by Melinda Tankard Reist. It describes itself as "a grassroots movement against the objectification of women and sexualisation of girls in media, advertising and popular culture." Various news and advocacy organizations have described its agenda as anti-porn. Collective Shout have protested the Australian release of films, books, and music they say sexualize women, as well as sales of child sex dolls.

The group garnered attention in 2025 after their successful campaign to get the digital distribution platforms Steam and Itch.io to remove hundreds of video games they asserted featured objectionable content such as rape, incest, and sexual violence. In the immediate aftermath, Itch.io temporarily deindexed all not-safe-for-work adult games. Collective Shout had initially petitioned Steam directly, but only achieved their goal after convincing payment processors to pressure game stores to remove the games. The campaign has elicited criticism claiming financial censorship, anti-LGBTQ+ discrimination, and suppression of creative freedom.

== History ==
Collective Shout was founded in 2009 by Melinda Tankard Reist, an Australian conservative political activist, writer, anti-abortion feminist and anti-pornography activist.

According to Collective Shout, it was founded in response to growing concern about the sexualisation of children. The organisation's name comes from a letter Tania Andrusiak sent to Melinda Tankard Reist, saying about Reist's book Getting Real: Challenging the Sexualisation of Girls, "This book is a collective shout against the pornification of culture".

Collective Shout has been described as an anti-porn lobbying group by The Guardian, Le Monde and other news outlets, as well as specialized gaming and LGBTQ+ media. The group's campaigns manager, Caitlin Roper, said Collective Shout is only "'anti-porn' in the sense that we recognize mainstream porn overwhelmingly depicts men's violence and abuse of women." She says they are "not looking to ban any instances of explicit or adult content" but that "[v]iolence and dehumanization of women should not be acceptable outcomes of free speech."

== Affiliations ==
Melinda Tankard Reist is the director for Collective Shout. She has written columns for ABC, Australia's public news service. Her ABC biography states her past affiliations with feminist publisher Spinifex Press, conservative think tank Women's Forum Australia, Christian non-governmental organization World Vision, and with Tasmanian Senator Brian Harradine.

Collective Shout says that the following are partner organisations: the Australian Childhood Foundation, Adopt Nordic WA, the Australian Summit Against Sexual Exploitation, Be Slavery Free, the Campaign Against Sex Robots, Coalition Against Trafficking in Women Australia (CATWA), City Women Toowoomba, Compassion International, Bodies Endangered, Girls Rising, the International Centre on Sexual Exploitation, Micah, the National Council of Jewish Women of Australia, the National Center on Sexual Exploitation, Not Buying It, the Resilient Kids Conference, Cyber Safety Solutions, The Rite Journey, Women's Voices, Bravehearts, the Raise Foundation, and Read To My Child.

== Campaigns ==
Throughout the 2010s and 2020s, Collective Shout has campaigned to withdraw from sale sexualized children's clothing.

In June 2011, Collective Shout petitioned the Australian Law Reform Commission to ban all X-rated movies in Australia.

On 14 September 2011, Collective Shout appealed the R18+ rating of the controversial A Serbian Film (2010), which depicts child sexual assault as an allegory for post-war violence, before the Australian Classification Review Board after reading film reviews and accounts of the film's content. Collective Shout described scenes of the movie to the review board, resulting in the film's rating being changed to refused classification.

In 2013, Collective Shout protested Seven Network's broadcasting of the Lingerie Football League, writing it was "sexist and demeaning to all women. It is not a sport, its purpose is to objectify women".

In August 2015, Collective Shout claimed responsibility for pulling Zoo Weekly, a lad magazine that featured swimsuit models, from some store shelves. In October, Zoo Weekly announced its closure, and Zoo swimsuit model Ashlee Adams criticized Collective Shout's actions, accusing it of censorship. Laura Pintur of Collective Shout said they were opposed to the magazines being sold in "family" supermarkets.

In 2017, Collective Shout, in conjunction with other anti-violence organizations, released a statement condemning the novel and film franchise Fifty Shades:

In real life, men use the same tactics as Christian Grey in the Fifty Shades trilogy to gain and maintain power and control over the women in their lives. This includes isolation, threats, physical and sexual assault. This is not entertainment. This is not sexy. This results in serious harm to women and in the worst case scenario, murder.

Also in 2017, the group protested an application for a Geraldton hotel to employ "skimpy barmaids". According to the Geraldton Guardian, "Roper said the treatment of women as sexual entertainment was linked to violence against women."

Also in 2017, Collective Shout campaigned against certain advertisements placed in Australia, such as Honey Birdette lingerie ads. Reist wrote in her Religion & Ethics column that year that Australia should implement advertising standards similar to those in France.

In 2020, fast food restaurant KFC apologised after Collective Shout criticised their television advertisement as containing "sexist grooming" and a "regression to tired and archaic stereotypes where young women are sexually objectified for male pleasure." However, that ad was not ruled in violation by Australia's Ad Standards bureau.

Also in 2020, Collective Shout brought media attention to and campaigned against the sale of child sex dolls in Australia.

=== Rap music ===
From 2013 to 2014, Collective Shout lobbied to have three American rappers' Australian visas revoked: Eminem, Snoop Dogg, and Tyler, the Creator. Collective Shout argued that welcoming these artists to perform in Australia undermined Australia's efforts to curb violence against women.

Collective Shout's effort to revoke Tyler, the Creator's visa was supported by MP Alex Hawke. In June 2013, Collective Shout member Talithia Stone tweeted her disapproval of Tyler and intent to protest a promotional event of his, which prompted Tyler to insult Stone during a concert, for which she reported him to the police "on grounds of verbal abuse". On 27 July 2015, Tyler tweeted that he was "banned from Australia", however, his touring company stated that, while the government had "raised issues" with his visa application, they had not refused it. His tours to Australia were, however, reportedly cancelled in 2015 as a result of Collective Shout's campaign.

=== Video games ===
In 2014, Collective Shout protested the video game Grand Theft Auto V ("GTA V"). They described GTA V as a "video game that encourages players to brutally murder women for entertainment". The game was banned from Target and Kmart retail chains in Australia that year, for which the group claimed responsibility. In response to this campaign, an anonymous Internet troll posting on 4chan (Note: According to The Sydney Morning Herald, the individual who impersonated Roper was Joshua Ryne Goldberg.) claimed responsibility for impersonating one of the group's leaders online.

In 2018, Collective Shout promoted a petition to ban the sale of Detroit: Become Human in Australia, a game which they said contains themes of "child abuse and violence against women". The game contains a scene where the player character is tasked with stopping an abusive father from beating his daughter to death.

Writing for Rock Paper Shotgun, Edwin Evans-Thirlwell assessed that Collective Shout opposed games that depict violence against women out of concern that such media increases the incidence of real-world violence:

Collective Shout have long called for the banning or delisting of games they regard as violently sexist, exploitative and abusive, as part of a wider campaign against the sexualisation and objectification of women in media. Much of their campaign is based on the argument that there is a causal relationship between such representations and real-life abuse.

==== 2025 Steam and Itch.io game removals ====
In April 2025, Collective Shout created a change.org petition calling on the digital game store Steam to stop selling the rape and incest game No Mercy. According to Reist, Steam refused to do so. After a complaint from UK technology secretary Peter Kyle, Steam removed the game for sale in the UK. The game was also removed for sale in Australia and Canada. On 10 April, No Mercy's developer opted to remove the game for sale globally.

In July 2025, Collective Shout launched an open letter campaign "demanding credit card companies and PayPal block payments" for games on Steam and Itch.io. Collective Shout claimed to have identified hundreds (Note: In the absence of Collective Shout enumerating the games, PC Gamer questioned the figure, challenging that their count likely includes duplicate entries.) of games on Steam that appeared in searches for the term "rape", or otherwise contained themes of incest, sexual violence, and/or child abuse. Collective Shout said they lobbied payment processors after receiving no reply to 3,000 emails sent to Steam's parent company, Valve Corporation. The campaign was co-signed by other groups and individuals, including those from the US-based National Centre on Sexual Exploitation (NCOSE, formerly "Morality in Media"), Exodus Cry, FiLiA, and the Coalition Against Trafficking in Women Australia (CATW). After this, hundreds of games were removed from Steam citing pressure from payment processors to remove the content, while Itch.io deindexed all adult not-safe-for-work games, stating the need to comply with payment processors immediately to stay viable, while planning to reinstate compliant projects back to the service in time. It was reported that over 20,000 games were delisted by Itch.io before the platform began to conditionally reinstate them, resulting in free games restored. Itch.io also reported that they were looking for alternative payment processors.

Collective Shout's 2025 campaign against games containing themes of sexual violence led to significant controversy, with the organization saying that they received misogynistic abuse and threats online as a result. Rock Paper Shotgun said there was "outcry from developers of erotic games and journalists who see this as continuing a pattern of financial institutions using their control of transactions to silence 'taboo' expressions of sex". Several non-pornographic games were affected by itch.io's removals, including Last Call, an award-nominated autobiographical game which explores domestic abuse and recovery through poems and features no explicit images.

This campaign has been criticised for negatively affecting the LGBTQ+ community, with numerous LGBTQ+ games removed or delisted. In an article from The Conversation, Phoebe Toups Dugas said "While content about us is seen by some as innately 'harmful' and 'sexual', it is essential for wellbeing. Conservative groups have long aimed to censor our art, voices and games."

Consume Me, a game with themes of eating disorders, was initially reported as having been affected. Itch.io's founder, Leaf Corocan, later clarified that Consume Me was not affected by the delisting of adult games, but rather had never been indexed to begin with as it had not met the site's indexing requirements.

Following the Steam game removals, Vice reporter Ana Valens scrutinized the group, noting they had retweeted trans-exclusionary feminist Meghan Murphy. Valens posited that it was doubtful that there were any child abuse games on Steam. Valens also accused the group of "targeting popular video games that depict children in scenarios where they face distress or harm — even if these depictions are intended to encourage concern and care in the player." She cited Collective Shout's campaign against the 2018 game Detroit: Become Human, which the group targeted due to its depiction of "child abuse and violence against women", however, Valens argued that the depiction was "intended to encourage empathy for the abused woman and child." Both articles were subsequently pulled by Vice.com's operator Savage Ventures. Valens claimed this was due to "concerns about the controversial subject matter". Valens and two coworkers resigned over the removals.

Counter-campaigns emerged to protest the delisting of Steam and Itch.io games, including in the form of petitions, phone calls, and emails to credit card processors Visa and Mastercard (cited by Steam as having pressured them to remove the games).

== See also ==
- Feminism
- Feminist sex wars
- Misogyny in rap music
- Sexual objectification
- Violence and video games

== Bibliography ==
- Reist, Melinda Tankard; Lahl, Jennifer (2019), Broken bonds: surrogate mothers speak out, North Geelong: Spinifex, ISBN 978-1-925581-55-3
- Reist, Melinda Tankard (2011). Big Porn Inc: exposing the harms of the global pornography industry. North Melbourne, Victoria: Spinifex Press. ISBN 978-1-876756-89-5.
