= Heartworm (video game) =

2025 video game

- Developer: Vincent Adinolfi
- Publisher: DreadXP
- Composer: Vincent Adinolfi
- Platforms: Linux; MacOS; Windows; Nintendo Switch; Nintendo Switch 2 PlayStation 4 PlayStation 5 Xbox One; Xbox Series X/S
- Release: Linux, MacOS, Windows: July 31, 2025; Switch, Switch 2, PS4, PS5, Xbox One, Xbox Series X/S: October 1, 2026
- Genre: Survival horror
- Mode: Single-player

Heartworm is an independent survival horror video game developed by Vincent Adinolfi and published by DreadXP. Described by the developer as a "lo-fi retro horror" game, the game integrates elements of survival horror and psychological horror set in an abandoned house rumoured to be able to revive the dead. A demo of the game was published on January 30, 2020, with a revised demo released on the 2020 horror game compilation Haunted PS1 Demo Disc by Irish developer Breogán Hackett.

The game was released on Linux, MacOS, and Windows on July 31, 2025. Versions for Nintendo Switch, Nintendo Switch 2, PlayStation 4, PlayStation 5, Xbox One, and Xbox Series X/S are set to release on October 1, 2026.

== Gameplay ==
Screenshot

Heartworm is an exploration and survival horror game with a fixed-perspective and tank controls, similar to Silent Hill and Resident Evil. The game features an inventory management system which assists the player to solve puzzles to progress the game, and simple combat mechanics using an over-the-shoulder perspective to 'shoot' enemies using a camera. The game also features interactable notes to further convey the story.

== Plot ==
Sam, a girl experiencing post-traumatic stress disorder, has developed an obsession with death and the deaths of those close to her, and is seeking ways to contact the dead. She finds an online message board with users discussing ways to contact the dead, including a house in the mountains that has a connection to the afterlife. Sam sets out to the house to find out its secrets for herself.

== Development ==
Adinolfi stated that development of Heartworm was in part a "platform to express my feelings from dealing with (mental health)," with the game's themes being partly autobiographical. He stated the initial development of the demo avoided establishing a "traditional narrative" with a focus upon "getting the atmosphere right" and establishing the gameplay, with inspiration taken from horror game titles including Silent Hill. Adinolfi stated that the 1998 game Half-Life was also an inspiration, stating he "tried to take cues from games like Half-Life in the way that Valve uses environment design to naturally develop the narrative." Adinolfi stated he was inspired to create Heartworm after playing games developed by Puppet Combo, citing the desire to create a game that did not require high-quality graphics to be effective.

== Reception ==
Reception

Aggregate score
Aggregator	Score
OpenCritic	50% recommend (Note: Based on 16 reviews)

The demo release of Heartworm received positive reception from critics, with several writing on the Haunted PS1 Demo Disc citing the game as a highlight of the compilation and raising favorable comparisons to Silent Hill. Writing for Rock Paper Shotgun, Alice O'Connor praised the game's presentation, citing its "late-nineties feel, including lovely unfiltered textures, raw dithering, and Resident Evil-style animations". Ian Marvin of Dread XP stated that "while the demo itself does not offer much...it does set the tone well and illustrates Vincent’s familiarity with the genre and the style of classic survival horror games." Lor Gislason stated the game was a "self-professed love letter to classics, and it shows." Writing for RE:BIND, Catherine Brinegar stated that the game was a "real gem" in the Haunted PS1 Demo Disk collection, praising the game as "whip-smart and tightly made".
