= Toree 3D =

2021 video game

- Steam cover art
- Developer: Siactro
- Publisher: Diplodocus Games
- Platforms: Windows; Nintendo Switch; Xbox One; Xbox Series X/S
- Release: 9 April 2021
- Genre: Platform
- Mode: Single-player

Toree 3D is a video game developed by Siactro, the professional name of independent developer Marcus Horn. Described as a "bite-sized 3D Platformer with a few weird elements", Toree 3D is a platformer inspired by the visual design and presentation of games from early 3D platformers. It was originally developed for the Haunted PS1 Demo Disc horror game compilation in March 2021, and was published independently and as part of compilations for the Nintendo Switch and Xbox. The game received an indifferent reception, with praise directed to its visual presentation and sound design, and mixed reception of its controls and length. In September 2021, a sequel, Toree 2, was released by Siactro, along with Toree's Panic Pack and Toree Saturn later on.

== Gameplay ==
Screenshot

Toree 3D is a platformer in which the player controls the titular Toree to reach the exit across nine levels of gameplay. Toree is able to traverse the levels using a run, jump and double jump, with a checkpoint system to return the player if they fall or collide with an enemy. The game features collectable stars, and a ranking system based on the time taken to complete each level. The game was updated to allow for improved controller support, new ranks and the ability to invert the camera.

== Development and release ==
Siactro developed Toree 3D over four months as a "small game" intended for console release with a focus on platforming over collection. Toree 3D received several console releases for the Nintendo Switch and Xbox. On 9 April 2021, publisher Diplodocus Games released a version of Toree 3D for the Nintendo Switch. In July 2022, Toree 3D was published by Diplodocus Games for Xbox as a compilation of four titles by Siactro named Toree's 3D Platformer Collection, including Toree 3D, Toree 2, Macbat 64 and Regina & Mac. In January 2023, publisher Leoful released Toree 3D for the Nintendo Switch as part of the compilation Super Retro Platformer Collection, alongside Siactro's other titles Regina & Mac and Macbat 64.

== Reception ==
Reception

Aggregate score
Aggregator	Score
Metacritic	67/100

Review scores
Publication	Score
Nintendo Life	8/10
Digitally Downloaded	2.5/5
Gaming Trend	80%

Toree 3D received indifferent reviews, with review website Metacritic aggregating "mixed or average reviews" from the game. Many critics praised the visual and sound design, with Gavin Lane of Nintendo Life describing the game as a "enjoyably bite-sized, colourful 3D platformer with great music and a fun aesthetic that doesn't take itself seriously in the slightest." Elisha Deogracias of Gaming Trend praised the "amazing soundtrack and wonderful art style", remarking "I enjoyed the intentionally blocky graphics, and the 90s look and feel of the game (and) the music is appropriately charming and addictive. It's a goofy package that evokes the childhood nostalgia I've had from a Kirby game."

Critics were divided on the controls and handling of the game's platforming. Writing for Nintendo Life, Gavin Lane praised the game as playing "rather well", stating the "basic locomotion feels good to control". Matt Sainsbury of Digitally Downloaded stated "the platforming is actually pretty tight, and strikes a decent balance between being challenging and being accessible," noting the game avoided camera issues. However, Matthew Pollesel of Gaming Age stated "the controls can be a little finicky, and you'll frequently find yourself fighting with a camera that never quite goes where you want it to go."

Many critics were mixed on the short length and limited content in the game. Pixel Die observed the game was "short", stating "my only criticism is wishing (the) game was longer". Matt Sainsbury of Digitally Downloaded stated the game has "about as much content as you would expect" for a one-dollar game, noting "the biggest pity is that the developers were so modest in their scope." In contrast, Matthew Pollesel of Gaming Age stated that "the levels are just the right length, and understand how to challenge you without being sadistic about it." Similarly, Elisha Deogracias of Gaming Trend noted "The overall length of Toree 3D could be an issue as well (nine levels clock in at around half an hour not including replays), but this is mitigated by the low price point of literally under a dollar."

== Legacy ==
On September 30, 2021, Siactro released a sequel, Toree 2, including a revised and expanded approach to Toree 3D, with the developer stating the sequel contained "more focus on the things people enjoyed in the first game like fast gameplay, flow focused levels and cute costumes."
