= Dread Central =

American website

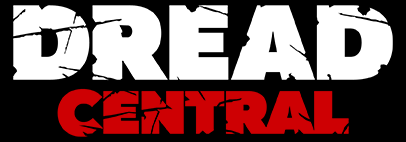
- Website type: Horror news, interviews, reviews
- Available in: English
- Country of origin: United States
- Owner: Be Afraid Media
- Editors: Brad Miska, Josh Korngut
- Website: dreadcentral.com
- Commercial: Yes
- Launched: July 4, 2006; 20 years ago
- Current status: Online

Dread Central is an American website founded in 2006 that is dedicated to horror fiction news, interviews, and reviews. It covers horror films, comics, novels, and toys. Dread Central has won the Rondo Hatton Classic Horror Award for Best Website four times and was selected as AMC's Site of the Week in 2008.

== History ==
Dread Central was founded on July 4, 2006. When a venture to create a horror-themed cable television channel stalled, the web team left and established their own news site.

In 2007, Dread Central and VersusMedia announced Horror D'Oeuvres, a competition for independent short films. In 2008, the site partnered with several other prominent horror sites and studios in a horror-themed auction to raise money for the Entertainment Industry Foundation. In 2013, they partnered with Gas Lamp Museum and the San Diego Ghost Hunters to organize a ghost hunt at the William Heath Davis House. The proceeds went toward upkeep for the historic site. Also in 2013, they began offering the "Box of Dread", a random package full of merchandise delivered monthly to subscribers, one of whom is randomly chosen to receive a "special edition" valued at $250.

In 2017, Dread Central Media was acquired by Epic Pictures Group. The independent studio announced it would be launching a new distribution label specializing in horror films released in theaters and on demand. On January 29, 2019, the label was renamed DREAD.

On January 6, 2026, Brad Miska was announced as the publication’s new owner and editor-in-chief, with Josh Korngut also recently announced as editorial director in 2025.

== Website ==
The site's staff use horror-themed aliases. The website has a broad focus, and it covers both mainstream and fringe topics that range from horror films to comics to toys. In 2013, Steve Persall of the Tampa Bay Times stated, "if it gushes blood or desecrates flesh, Dread Central covers it," and "the site is oriented toward a male demographic and favors edgy, exploitative films. Celebrity supporters include John Carpenter, Gale Anne Hurd, Sid Haig, Adam Green, and Darren Lynn Bousman.

== Other ventures ==
=== DREAD ===
Significant releases include:

- Terrifier
- Benny Loves You
- Tales of Halloween
- The Lodgers
- Satanic Hispanics
- The Jester
- Nina Forever
- Harpoon
- Beezel
- Bad Candy
- The Lake
- Howling Village

=== DREAD Podcast Network ===
The DREAD Podcast Network consists of a variety of horror-centric podcasts. Notable network talent include The Boulet Brothers, Mick Garris, and Mark Ramsay with podcasts such as:

- Development Hell
- Dark Sanctum
- Scarred for Life
- Girl, That's Scary
- Kim and Ket Stay Alive ... Maybe
- Post Mortem with Mick Garris
- Creatures of the Night

=== DreadXP ===
DreadXP was founded in 2019 by Dread Central founder Jon Condit and overseen by editor in chief Ted Hentschke as a video gaming website with a focus on editorial, reviews, podcasts, and original streaming content.

In 2020, DreadXP turned to video game publishing with the release of Dread X Collection, an anthology of horror video games created by several indie developers. In early 2024, it was announced that Hunter Bond and Brian Clarke would be taking charge at DreadXP. Significant game releases include:

- The Mortuary Assistant
- Sucker for Love: First Date
- Amanda the Adventurer
- Amanda the Adventurer 2
- Amanda the Adventurer 3
- Heartworm
- My Friendly Neighborhood
- White Knuckle
- Dread Delusion
