= Fatum Betula =

2020 video game

- Steam version logo
- Developer: Bryce Bucher
- Publisher: Baltoro Games
- Engine: Unity
- Platforms: Windows; Nintendo Switch; Xbox One; Xbox Series X/S
- Release: Windows; June 20, 2020; Nintendo Switch; March 12, 2021; Xbox One/Series; January 19, 2022
- Genre: Adventure
- Mode: Single-player

Fatum Betula is a 2020 video game by Texas-based independent developer Bryce Bucher. Described as an "atmospheric exploration game with light puzzle elements", the game is an open-ended adventure game inspired by the aesthetics of fifth generation video game consoles. The game was included in the 2020 horror game compilation Haunted PS1 Demo Disc by Irish developer Breogán Hackett. Following its release on Windows, Baltoro Games ported the game for release on the Nintendo Switch in 2021 and the Xbox One and Xbox Series X/S consoles in 2022.

== Gameplay ==
Gameplay screenshot

Gameplay in Fatum Betula is an adventure game played in first-person perspective without a user interface, with limited controls used to talk to characters, collect and use items, and open doors. The player is required to explore to collect liquids to nourish a birch tree that will determine the fate of the world and trigger one of ten unique endings for the game. The game features an inventory to collect fluids and obtain items, which assist in completing tasks given by other creatures and spirits that inhabit the world to obtain fluids. Items include a fishing rod used to catch fish, a knife used to cut items, and a jar used to capture the essence of certain items. The game also features hidden endings and secret areas.

== Plot ==
The game follows an unnamed protagonist who wakes up in a room known as The Plant Room. Progressing up a staircase leads the player character to the Fate Birch, and meets a monster provides the player with three test tubes and tells them that the world is in a state of limbo due to the water around the Fate Birch. The player is tasked to fill the three test tubes and alter the water below the Fate Birch by whatever means necessary.

== Development ==
A demo version of Fatum Betula was released as part of the 2020 horror game compilation Haunted PS1 Demo Disc by Irish developer Breogán Hackett, a compilation strongly inspired by the aesthetics of the PlayStation. Bucher played a collaborative role in conceptualising, organising, and developing the launcher for the compilation. Bucher stated that the design of Fatum Betula was strongly influenced by his experiences with the Nintendo 64, stating "the fifth-generation console aesthetic lends itself to environments that are intimate...the aesthetic really lends itself well to creating environments that force the player to engage with them rather than just being set dressing."

== Reception ==
Fatum Betula received praise for its unique presentation and design. Writing for Vice, Patrick Klepek praised the game as "teeming with small details and mysteries" and "design ethos underscored by its PlayStation 1-era aesthetic, full of pixelated textures and blocky character models that aren't as interested in approximating realism as today's games." Also writing for Vice, Chia Contreras provided the game as an example of an emerging "renaissance" of games inspired by the aesthetics of the PlayStation. Ryan Epps of TheGamer praised Fatum Betula as an "unforgettable experience", highlighting the game's "evocative approach to exploration", "diverse and unique locations", and "replayability", comparing the surrealistic horror qualities of the game to Osamu Sato's 1999 PlayStation game LSD: Dream Emulator. KJ Robertson of Alpha Beta Gamer praised the game as a "fascinating experience", stating the art style conveyed a "real Ghibli-esque sense of mythical wonder to the world."
