= Game demo =

Trial version of a video game

A game demo is a trial version of a video game that is limited to a certain time period or a point in progress. A game demo comes in forms such as shareware, demo discs, downloadable software, and tech demos.

== Distribution ==
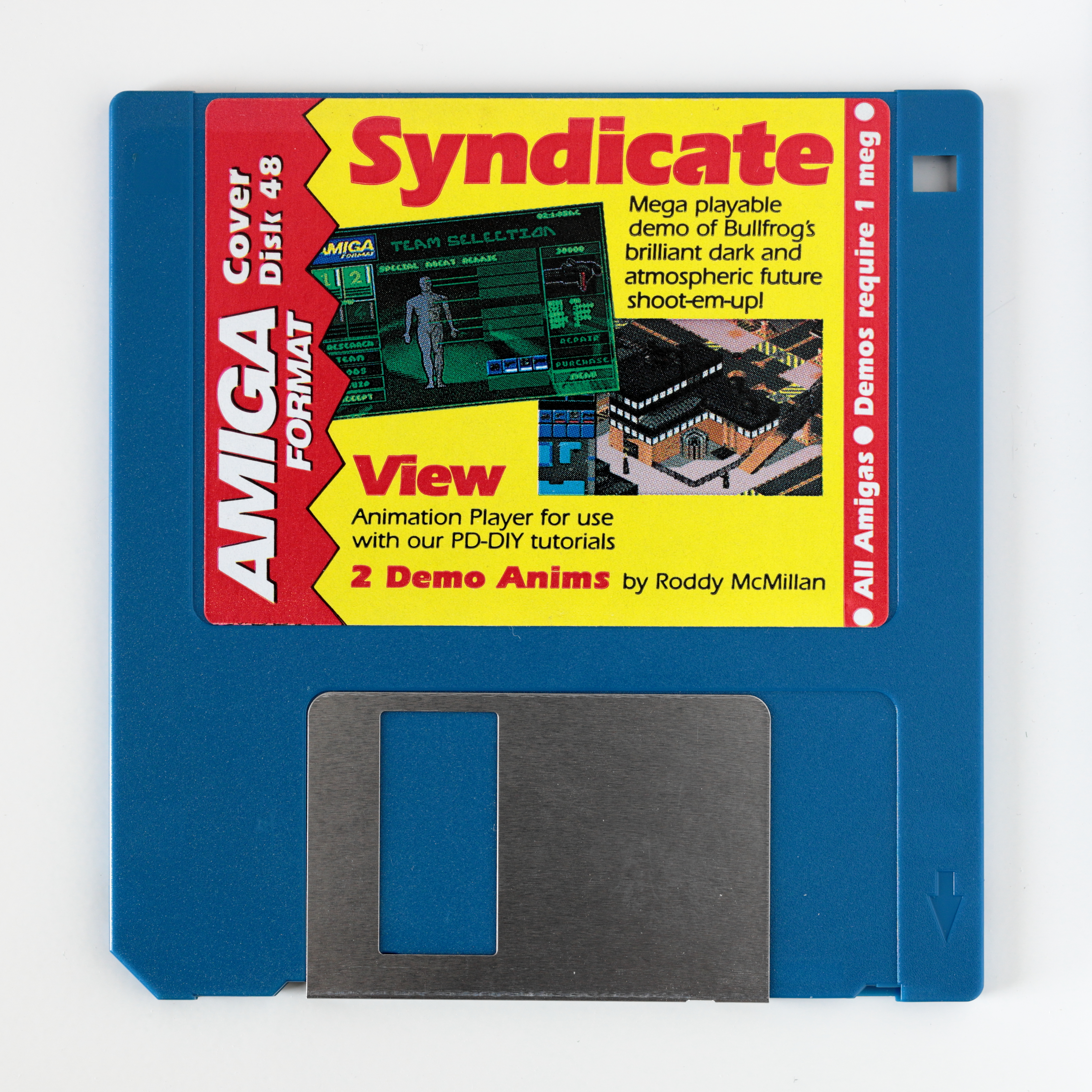
A game demo cover disk distributed with Amiga Format magazine in 1993

In the early 1990s, shareware distribution was a popular method for publishing games for smaller developers, including then-fledgling companies such as Apogee Software (now 3D Realms), Epic MegaGames (now Epic Games), and id Software. It gave consumers the chance to try a trial portion of the game, usually restricted to the game's complete first section or "episode", before purchasing the rest of the adventure. Racks of games on single 5 1/4" and later 3.5" floppy disks were common in many stores, often very cheaply. Since the shareware versions were essentially free, the cost only needed to cover the disk and minimal packaging. Sometimes, the demo disks were packaged within the box of another game by the same company. As the increasing size of games in the mid-1990s made them impractical to fit on floppy disks, and retail publishers and developers began to earnestly mimic the practice, shareware games were replaced by shorter demos that were either distributed free on CDs with gaming magazines or as free downloads over the Internet, in some cases becoming exclusive content for specific websites.

Shareware was also the distribution method of choice of early modern first-person shooters (FPS).

There is a technical difference between shareware and demos. Up to the early 1990s, shareware could easily be upgraded to the full version by adding the "other episodes" or full portion of the game; this would leave the existing shareware files intact. Demos are different in that they are "self-contained" programs that cannot be upgraded to the full version. An example is the Descent shareware versus the Descent II demo; players were able to retain their saved games on the former but not the latter.

Magazines that include the demos on a CD or DVD and likewise may be exclusive to a certain publication. Demos are also sometimes released on cover tape/disks, especially in the United Kingdom and mainland Europe, but given the increasing size of demos and widespread availability of broadband Internet, this common practice throughout the 1980s and 1990s gradually lost cover focus to full games. With the advent of online services for consoles, demos are also becoming available as a free or premium download.

Console manufacturers also often release their systems with a demo disc containing playable previews of games to be released for their console.

== Medium ==
The availability of demos varies between formats. Systems that use cartridges typically did not have demos available to them, unless they happen to be digital, due to the cost of duplication, whereas systems supporting more cheaply produced media, such as tapes, floppy disks, and later CD-ROM and DVD-ROM, do. Now, the Internet is the main source for demos, as nearly all game developers and platforms focus on online distribution.

== Types ==
Game demos come in two variations: playable and non-playable (also called a "rolling demo"). Playable demos generally have exactly the same gameplay as the upcoming full game, although game advancement is usually limited to a certain point, and occasionally some advanced features might be disabled. A non-playable demo is essentially the gaming equivalent of a teaser trailer.

=== Playable ===
Generally, playable demos are stripped-down versions of the full game, restricting game-play to some levels, only allowing access to some features, or limiting the amount of time playable in the game. However, some demos provide content not available in the full game.

In other cases, a demo may differ from the equivalent section in the full game, when the demo is released as a preview before the full game is completed.

Demos for platform or other action games generally only include the first few levels of the game. Demos of adventure games are often limited to a very small number of rooms, and have the "save game" feature disabled. Demos of sports games usually limit play to an accelerated half-time or complete match between a small number of teams (which at the same time led to the practice of "demo expanders" that allow the tweaking of some of those settings). Likewise, demos of racing games are ordinarily restricted to a single race with a pre-selected car.

=== Non-playable ===
A non-playable demo is a recording of game-play, either recorded in a video, or played through using the game's own engine showing off the game's features. They are mainly displayed at gaming conventions, such as E3, when the game is still in early production as a technology or game-play preview. Such demos might also be distributed through the Internet or with magazines as trailers for an upcoming game, or featured at retail stores (often among playable demos). Most games also play demos if the title screen is left running.

== See also ==
- Shareware
- Demo (software)
- Technology demonstration
- Haunted PS1
