= Tank controls (video games) =

Video game control system

Tank controls are a control system used in video games whereby players control movement relative to the position of the player character, rather than the perspective of the game camera. Tank controls were common in 3D games in the 1990s, but free-roaming cameras have since become standard. They are named by analogy to the tank steering systems.

== System ==
In a game with tank controls, pressing up on the game controller moves the character in the direction they face, down reverses them, and left and right rotates them. This differs from many games, in which characters move in the direction players push from the perspective of the camera. Tank controls were common in 3D games in the 1990s, such as Grim Fandango and the early Resident Evil and Tomb Raider games.

Tank controls allow players to maintain a direction when the camera angle changes. The Grim Fandango designer Tim Schafer chose the system as it allowed the developers to create "cinematic" camera cuts without disrupting the controls. Shinji Mikami, the director of the first Resident Evil (1996), felt the use of fixed camera perspectives and tank controls made the game scarier.

== Criticism ==
Tank controls have been criticized as stiff or cumbersome. They have become less common over time and free-roaming cameras have become standard for 3D games. The remastered versions of Grim Fandango, Resident Evil, and Tomb Raider include alternative control schemes, and later Resident Evil and Tomb Raider games discarded tank controls.
