= Itch.io =

Website for distributing games

itch.io

- Screenshot of Itch.io storefront as of March 2026
- Website type: Digital distribution, indie game distribution
- Available in: English
- Owner: Leaf Corcoran
- Founder: Leaf Corcoran
- Website: itch.io
- Commercial: Yes
- Registration: Optional (required to upload content, comment, and join game jams)
- Launched: March 3, 2013; 13 years ago
- Current status: Online

itch.io (stylized in all lowercase) is a website for users to host, sell and download indie video games, indie role-playing games, game assets, comics, zines and music. Launched in March 2013 by Leaf Corcoran, the service hosts over 1,000,000 products as of November 2024.

Itch.io allows users to host game jams, even where participants have limited time to create a game, though Itch.io allows jams for other types of media. Itch.io also allows multiple users to sell their products together in "bundles".

== History ==
In 2012, American hobbyist programmer Leaf Corcoran created his own programming language, "MoonScript", and started making games in it, but had nowhere to distribute them. Steam, the leading video game distribution platform, had implemented a greenlight system for games based on community voting. Corcoran decided to create a more open marketplace for indie games in MoonScript, inspired by Bandcamp's model. He started coding in January 2013 and the website was launched on March 3, on his unused domain name itch.io. However, it attracted little attention at first and mostly served as his personal repository. Itch.io began getting attention through his participation in the game jam Ludum Dare, and so Corcoran added contest-hosting tools to the platform. In early 2014, Itch.io hosted a Flappy Bird–themed Flappy Jam after the popular game was removed from the App Store. It attracted hundreds of submissions and received media coverage. At the end of the year, Corcoran said that he had lost over $8,000 running Itch.io. The platform had been a solo project of Corcoran's for the entire year.

By 2015, Itch.io had become established as a dedicated platform for indie developers. By June, it had paid over $393,000 and hosted over 15,000 creations, a figure which had tripled over the previous nine months. A desktop application for Itch.io was released in early 2016. By February 2017, Itch.io had reached five million game downloads.

In 2021, during the lawsuit Epic Games v. Apple, Epic Games protested that Apple was unwilling to host competing stores on Apple's App Store. Itch.io had been added to the Epic Games Store shortly before, which commentators saw as an attempt to demonstrate that they did not do the same. Apple's lawyers argued that Epic indirectly facilitated access to games that they have not vetted by drawing attention to "unspeakable games" with sexualized content on Itch.io. Itch.io's indie community was skeptical of both companies, but some found the debate humorous. One user launched the "Unspeakable Jam" and Itch.io joked on Twitter that Apple's lawyers called and said to "turn off ALL the games." ScreenHub Australia's Chantelle McColl thought that the response was moot, considering that such third-party applications could be accessed on Apple devices.

A 2019 public report revealed that Itch.io hosted over 200,000 games.

On December 8, 2024, Itch.io's domain was made inaccessible due to an automated phishing report generated by BrandShield's AI platform on behalf of Funko. Itch.io was brought back online later the same day.

== Features and functionality ==
Corcoran discussing itch.io at the 2016 XOXO festival

Itch.io is a common platform for small and independent developers. Anybody can publish on the website. It uses a pay-what-you-want model for both customers and developers. Developers can set a minimum price for their games, but buyers can choose to pay extra. Since 2015, Itch.io has let developers dictate how much revenue the website receives from their sales. It is set at 10% by default, which at the time was below an industry norm of 30%, but can be set at any amount, including 0%. One of Itch.io's most well known features are its customizable store pages.

During the platform's early years, Corcoran implemented unusual requests from the community. Alan Hazelden, creator of A Good Snowman Is Hard to Build (2015), asked for a "price-changing API" which changed the cost to match real-world temperatures. The "Refinery" early access tools debuted in 2016 after a request from Overland developer Adam Saltsman. Developers can use secret URLs, password protection and limit the number of sales, and add tiered purchases and rewards.

Itch.io is often viewed as a platform for beginner developers, a "stepping-stone" to Steam, which has wider brand recognition and a higher entry standard; it costs $100 to post games on Steam and legal paperwork must be completed before registering. Corcoran viewed this perception of his platform as disheartening. He cited a 2017 game called Clone Drone in the Danger Zone, which was a financial success on Itch.io, but its sales on the website dropped by 20% after it moved to Steam.

=== Bundles ===
Game developers can sell bundles of games together. Bundles are usually organized around a shared topic, genre or community. In addition to bundles for shared profit among game developers, Itch.io also hosts charity bundles to raise money for various causes. Itch.io lets users split up bundle profits between accounts any way they want, either evenly or by percentages of total sales.

In 2021 and 2022, Itch.io ran a Queer Games Bundle during Pride Month to raise money cooperatively for LGBTQ game developers and zine makers. The 2022 version contained more than 500 items, and raised US$216,000 for 431 creators even though it had a "pay what you want" option.

Itch.io has launched many bundles surrounding social issues to raise money for charities. In support of the George Floyd protests, Itch.io organized the Bundle for Racial Justice and Equality in June 2020. It initially launched with over 700 games, but increased to over 1,500 as additional developers offered to contribute. In 11 days, the bundle raised US$8.1 million for the NAACP Legal Defense and Educational Fund and Community Bail Fund. Other charity bundles include the "TTRPGs for Trans Rights" series; the 2022 "Bundle for Ukraine" for the International Medical Corps and Voices of Children, which raised over $400,000 on its first day, during the Russian invasion of Ukraine; the 2022 "Indie Bundle for Abortion Funds" which raised over $380,000 in response to the overturning of Roe v. Wade; and the 2025 "No ICE in California" bundle which raised over $100,000 for the Immigrant Defenders Law Center and RAICES.

== Content ==
=== Library ===
This willingness to experiment [...] makes Itch.io feel like a garden of digital possibility, one unburdened by corporate overlords or the growing malaise of loot boxes. Here, you might find some junk that someone made in a few hours, barely playable or legible — or you might find a raw yet heartfelt game that does something you've never seen before.

— Patricia Hernandez, The Verge

Itch.io's store largely contains small and experimental indie games. Other products, such as books, music, and assets, can be uploaded to Itch.io for any purpose; the product descriptor can be changed to anything. There has been a trend of low poly and pixelated horror games on the platform, usually to emulate the visuals of outdated video game consoles such as the PlayStation.

Most Itch.io games are not well-known. A review of Itch.io by PC Mag's Jordan Miner praised its library of more unique and artistic indie games, but conceded it catered to a more specific, "indie-centric" audience.

=== Delisting of adult content ===
On July 24, 2025, Itch.io delisted thousands of adult games from sale after receiving concerns from major payment processors, which had been initiated by the Australian non-profit group, Collective Shout, along with other similar organizations, claiming numerous games on Itch.io, as well as Steam, were depicting rape, incest, and exploitation of women. While Valve selectively removed those games identified as problematic and updated policies to restrict such games in the future, Itch.io opted to temporarily deindex all games tagged as mature content and to undergo a review of each under the terms expected by the payment processors before readding them to the service. Corcoran said they needed to take this action "to protect the platform's core payment infrastructure", and that whereas Steam is a closed platform where each game is reviewed before its addition to the store, Itch.io had no similar process before a game was listed on the marketplace. Melinda Tankard Reist, the founder of Collective Shout, said the intent of their effort was only towards games depicting rape and incest, and not all adult games, and she expected that most of the games that were deindexed on Itch.io would be returned to the service in time.

Itch.io later introduced guidelines that would restrict sales of games on its platform regardless of the context used in the game, and were exploring the potential to use alternative payment processors that would better support purchases of legal adult content.

Thousands of game developers and users were affected as they reported their games being pulled without notifying, halted payouts and being unable to download games that they previously purchased. Itch.io posted a statement acknowledging the criticism. Naomi Clark, a game designer and professor who serves as the departmental chair of NYU Game Center, expressed concern about the removal of games on Steam and Itch due to pressure from payment processors in an interview with 404 Media. Clark believed that the decisions by credit card companies had the potential to spread to other categories, including non-pornographic games, and that this would hamper games as a creative form by restricting the ability of game designers to make games about serious things. Wired cited several non-pornographic games affected by Itch.io's removals, such as Consume Me (whose developers commented that "The position of these right-wing groups is often that ANY LGBTQ+ content is 'adult' by default") and the award-nominated Last Call (an autobiographical game which explores domestic abuse and recovery through poems and features no explicit images). Wired considers this sequence of events a slippery slope towards further censorship of video games.

Due to the Online Safety Act 2023, Itch.io blocked UK users from accessing to NSFW pages without verifying their age on July 25, 2025.

=== Community ===
Itch.io has developed a dedicated community of niche indie creators, for which it has become a prominent platform. They regularly host game jams.

== See also ==
- Game jam
- Indie game
