= Haunted PS1 =

Series of video game compilations

- Logo
- Genre: Horror
- Developer: Various
- Creator: Breogán Hackett
- First release: Haunted PS1 Demo Disc 2020; 6 February 2020
- Latest release: Haunted PS1 Demo Disc: Flipside Frights; 11 January 2025

Haunted PS1 is a community of video game developers, known for their compilations in collaboration with independent developers on the indie games website itch.io. The most notable releases, Demo Discs, are annual compilations of independent games from various genres influenced by the graphics and visual presentation of the PlayStation as well as menus inspired by actual PS1 demo discs or other PlayStation games such as Namco Museum releases on the platform. The Demo Discs series received praise from several websites for their niche theme, variety of titles and novel method of distribution, with a number of games from the releases receiving sufficient attention to lead to further development and commercial release on their own merit.

== History ==
Irish independent developer Breogán Hackett initially established Haunted PS1 on itch.io in March 2018. Hackett stated the desire to establish Haunted PS1 was influenced by the absence of a community for independent developers at the time, stating "there's a whole load of horror games being made, but very little community around it." Hackett initially created the community as a Discord server to talk and collaborate with "a few developers working on low-res horror games...I just wanted to be able to talk to other developers about things that were relevant to small-scale indie devs making that sort of game." Hackett hosted a series of game jams regularly from October 2018, with the first, The Haunted PS1 Halloween Jam, encouraging "spooky" and "low-res" entries. Hackett cites the growth of participation in the game jams as the primary reason for the expansion of the Haunted PS1 community and Demo Disc compilations.

== Games ==
=== Haunted PS1 Demo Disc ===
The Haunted PS1 Demo Disc is an annual series of compilations released through the Haunted PS1 brand, with the first released in February 2020. Demo Discs are releases that imitate the design of demo discs commonly distributed by publications during the era of the PlayStation, with a visual presentation "evoking the feeling and aesthetic of late nineties games", in particular the graphics of PlayStation horror games including Resident Evil and Silent Hill. The games span genres with a focus on horror and exploration games.

Reception of the Demo Disc series has been positive, with praise directed at the variety of titles offered. Writing for Giant Bomb, Nina Freeman praised the initial compilation as one of the best games of 2020, highlighting them as a "good source of discovery" through "hand-done curation" in contrast to algorithm-based recommendations. Heather Alexandra of Kotaku praised the variety of the compilation, stating the game was "packed to the brim with tons of different approaches to horror and tension." Fraser Brown of PC Gamer similarly stated that the compilation showcased "broad range of styles and interpretations of the PS1 aesthetic." The A.V. Club named the 2020 Demo Disc as one of the best games of 2020, stating that each title in the compilation "comes with surprises, whether a twist on an old formula or something new altogether," stating the series provided "precious reminders that there's still place in the medium for new, unfamiliar directions."

=== List of compilations ===
Compilation	Date	Number of games
Haunted PS1 Demo Disc 2020	6 February 2020	17
EEK3 2020: Virtual Show Floor	20 June 2020	40
C.H.A.I.N.	31 October 2020	20
The Madvent Calendar 2020	1 December 2020	24
Haunted PS1 Demo Disc 2021	25 March 2021	25
The Madvent Calendar 2	1 December 2021	24
Haunted PS1 Demo Disc: Spectral Mall	28 August 2022	18
The Madvent Calendar 3: Necrosis	1 December 2022	30
C.H.A.I.N.G.E.D.	6 June 2023	39
The Madvent Calendar 4: End Of The Line	1 December 2023	24
Haunted PS1 Demo Disc: Flipside Frights	11 January 2025	24
Madvent Calendar 5: Post Mortem	2 December 2025	24
The Overlook Rehaunted	TBA	15
C.H.A.I.N. 3 (Working Title)	TBD	TBD

== Influence ==
The Demo Disc series has been noted for its role in bringing attention to an emerging genre of independent horror games influenced by the graphics of the PlayStation. Writing for SUPERJUMP, Anthony Wright noted the Demo Disc series was a "great platform for (developers) to gain attention towards their efforts" and "showcase their talents to the industry", as well as "encouraging an increasing number of players to dip their feet into the retro-styled horror landscape." Fraser Brown of PC Gamer similarly remarked that the series "(shone) a spotlight on indie dev projects, which might normally fall through the cracks." Writing for The Verge, Alexander Chatziioannou, in a review of the resurgence of the "retro horror" genre, stated that the series "(has) revitalized a format oddly neglected in the medium". Vulture said that Haunted PS1 is probably the best entry point into the low-res horror scene.

Several games that have previously appeared on the Demo Disc releases have been continued by their developers into full commercial releases, including Toree 3D, Dread Delusion, and Fatum Betula.
