= Eastasiasoft =

Video game publisher

Eastasiasoft Limited
- Type: Private
- Industry: Video games
- Founded: 28 June 2007; 19 years ago
- Headquarters: Hong Kong, China
- Website: www.eastasiasoft.com

Eastasiasoft Limited (Chinese: 東亞遊戲有限公司, stylized as eastasiasoft) is an independent game developer and video game publisher headquartered in Hong Kong, specializing in indie video games and niche media. Eastasiasoft was founded in 2007 as a digital publisher before branching out to publishing physical games in 2016. The company publishes digital and physical versions of games for Windows, MacOS, SteamOS, PlayStation Vita, PlayStation 4, PlayStation 5, Xbox One, Xbox Series X and Series S, and Nintendo Switch.

Eastasiasoft is credited as a developer and/or publisher on 331 games between 2007 and 2023, and has published games by developers such as DOMO Studio, Compile Heart, Rainbite, Suzaku Games, SideQuest Studios, and Softstar Entertainment, among others. Per the company's name, Eastasiasoft primarily focuses on distributing games in Asian markets and via online retailers such as Play-Asia, though on occasion they also handle distribution for games released in North America, Europe, and worldwide. Eastasiasoft also provides English localization services.

== History ==
Eastasiasoft was founded in 2007 with a focus on obscure and less-mainstream game genres. Funding for the first game that Eastasiasoft published, Söldner-X: Himmelsstürmer, was secured from Play-Asia.

In 2020, Eastasiasoft was slated to release Octonaut, a retro shoot 'em up originally released on Steam on 15 May 2019, on consoles. However, after publishing the game for PlayStation 4 on 23 June 2020, it was delisted and eventually withdrawn for sale, with the Xbox One and Switch Ports delayed to September 2020, at which point the game was renamed Takotan. Gaming journalist Shawn Sackenheim suggested this was to prevent copyright issues relating to Octonauts, an unrelated British children's television show copyrighted by Silvergate Media.

Waifu Uncovered, an eroge shoot 'em up developed by One-Hand-Free Studios and published on the Nintendo eShop by Eastasiasoft on 16 July 2020, was the first Nintendo Switch game to show female nipples.

== Games ==
Eastasiasoft is credited as a developer and/or publisher on 331 games between 2007 and 2023.

The following table lists Eastasiasoft's body of work, but is by no means exhaustive. There are currently 106 games on this list. (Note: This number is always up to date by this script.)

Year	Title	Developer(s)	Platform(s)	Ref.
2007	Söldner-X: Himmelsstürmer	SideQuest Studios	Microsoft Windows, PS3	
2010	Söldner-X 2: Final Prototype	SideQuest Studios	PS3, PS Vita	
2012	Rainbow Moon	SideQuest Studios	PS3, PS4, PS Vita	
2016	Bard's Gold	Pixel Lantern	PS Vita	
2016	Lost Sea	Eastasiasoft	PS4, Xbox One	
2017	Cursed Castilla EX	Locomalito	PS4, Nintendo Switch	
2017	Ghost Blade HD	2Dream	PS4, Nintendo Switch	
2018	Blue Rider	Ravegan, Ratalaika Games	Nintendo Switch	
2018	Eternum Ex	Flynn's Arcade, Radin Games	PS4, PS Vita	
2018	Fast Striker	NG:Dev.Team	PS4, PS Vita	
2018	Hyper Sentinel	Four5six Games	Nintendo Switch	
2018	I Am The Hero	Ratalaika Games	PS Vita	
2018	Iro Hero	Artax Games	Nintendo Switch, Xbox One	
2018	Mars: Chaos Menace	Byte4Games	Nintendo Switch	
2018	Rainbow Skies	SideQuest Studios	Nintendo Switch, PS4, PS3, PS Vita	
2018	Reverie	Rainbite	PS4	
2018	Shadow of Loot Box	Ratalaika Games	Nintendo Switch	
2018	Sir Eatsalot	Behind the Stone	Nintendo Switch, PS Vita	
2018	Super Meat Boy	Team Meat	Nintendo Switch	
2019	A Hole New World	Mad Gear Games	PS4	
2019	BDSM: Big Drunk Satanic Massacre	Big Way Games	Nintendo Switch	
2019	Family Tree	Infinite State Games	Nintendo Switch	
2019	Freedom Finger	Wide Right Interactive	Nintendo Switch	
2019	Furwind	Boomfire Games	Nintendo Switch	
2019	Gunlord X	NGDEV	PS4, Nintendo Switch	
2019	The Legend of Sword and Fairy 6	Softstar Entertainment	PS4	
2019	Metaloid: Origin	Retro Revolution	Nintendo Switch	
2019	Moero Crystal H	Compile Heart	Nintendo Switch	
2019	Odallus: The Dark Call	JoyMasher	Nintendo Switch	
2019	Oniken: Unstoppable Edition	JoyMasher	Nintendo Switch	
2019	Super Box Land Demake	Ratalaika Games	PS Vita	
2019	Valfaris	Steel Mantis	Nintendo Switch, PS4	
2019	War Theatre	Arcade Distillery	PS Vita	
2020	112th Seed	Nerd Games, Slider Games	Nintendo Switch, Xbox One	
2020	Batu Ta Batu	2Awesome Studio	Nintendo Switch	
2020	Circuits	Digital Tentacle	PS4	
2020	Crawlco Block Knockers	CosmiKankei	Nintendo Switch	
2020	Damsel	Screwtape Studios	PS4, Nintendo Switch	
2020	Drunken Fist	Deklazon	Nintendo Switch	
2020	Grizzland	Eastasiasoft	Xbox One	
2020	Horizon Chase Turbo	Aquiris Game Studio	PS Vita	
2020	HyperParasite	Troglobytes Games	Nintendo Switch	
2020	Kawaii Deathu Desu	Pippin Games, Top Hat Studios	Nintendo Switch, PS Vita	
2020	Link-a-Pix Deluxe	Lightwood Games	PS4, Nintendo Switch	
2020	Lumini	Speelbaars	Nintendo Switch	
2020	Mushroom Heroes	Dolores Entertainment	Nintendo Switch, PS Vita	
2020	Never Again	Primary Games	Nintendo Switch	
2020	Nicole	Ratalaika Games	PS Vita	
2020	Null Drifter	Panda Indie Studio	PS4, Nintendo Switch, Xbox One	
2020	One Finger Death Punch 2	Silver Dollar Games	PS4	
2020	Project Starship	Panda Indie Studio	Xbox One	
2020	Red Death	Panda Indie Studio	Xbox One	
2020	Söldner-X 2: Final Prototype: Definitive Edition	SideQuest Studios	PS4	
2020	Super Meat Boy Forever	Team Meat	Nintendo Switch	
2020	Takotan	Eastasiasoft	PS Vita	
2020	Task Force Kampas	Eastasiasoft	PS Vita	
2020	Unto The End	2 Ton Studios	Nintendo Switch	
2020	Waifu Uncovered	One-Hand-Free Studios	Microsoft Windows, Nintendo Switch	
2020	Without Escape	Bumpy Trail Games	Nintendo Switch, PSVita, Xbox One	
2020	Xeno Crisis	Bitmap Bureau, DO Games	Nintendo Switch, PS4, PSVita	
2020	Zero Strain	Kaio Meris	Nintendo Switch, PS4	
2021	0 Degrees	Eastasiasoft, Nerd Games, Kiddo Dev	Nintendo Switch, Xbox One	
2021	20 Bunnies	Nerd Games, Eastasiasoft	PS4, PS5	
2021	Beat Souls	Zoo Corporation	Microsoft Windows, Nintendo Switch, PS4, PS5, Xbox One, Xbox Series X/S	
2021	Bishoujo Battle Cyber Panic!	Eastasiasoft, Zoo Corporation	Nintendo Switch	
2021	Bishoujo Battle Mahjong Solitaire	Eastasiasoft, Zoo Corporation	Nintendo Switch	
2021	Blitz Breaker	Boncho Games, Ratalaika Games	Nintendo Switch	
2021	Brotherhood United	Eastasiasoft	PS Vita	
2021	Cave Bad	Eastasiasoft, Panda Indie Studio	Nintendo Switch	
2021	Death Tales	Eastasiasoft	PS Vita	
2021	Delicious! Pretty Girls Mahjong Solitaire	Eastasiasoft, Zoo Corporation	Nintendo Switch	
2021	Dungeons & Bombs	Sometimes You	PSVita	
2021	Empire of Angels IV	Softstar Entertainment	PS4, Nintendo Switch, Xbox One	
2021	Habroxia 2	Lillymo Games	PS4, PS Vita	
2021	Horned Knight	Josep Monzonis Hernandez	Nintendo Switch	
2021	Indigo 7: Quest for Love	Dolores Entertainment	PS Vita	
2021	Kingdom of Arcadia	Spoonbox Studio, Ratalaika Games	Nintendo Switch, PS4, PS5, Xbox One, Xbox Series X/S	
2021	The Lost Cube	JanduSoft	PS Vita	
2021	Luckslinger	Duckbridge	PS Vita	
2021	Mastho is Together	Kind Cat Games	Nintendo Switch	
2021	Poker Pretty Girls Battle: Fantasy World Edition	Zoo Corporation	Nintendo Switch	
2021	Pretty Girls Panic!	Zoo Corporation	Nintendo Switch	
2021	Pushy and Pully in Blockland	Resistance Studio	PS Vita	
2021	Roommates	Ratalaika Games	PS Vita	
2021	Sense: A Cyberpunk Ghost Story	Suzaku Games	PS Vita	
2021	#SinucaAttack	Eastasiasoft	Nintendo Switch, Xbox One	
2021	SkullPirates	Arcade Distillery	PS Vita	
2021	Trigger Witch	Rainbite	Nintendo Switch	
2021	UnMetal	@unepic_fran	PS Vita	
2021	Waifu Discovered 2: Medieval Fantasy	One-Hand-Free Studios	Nintendo Switch	
2022	Bishoujo Battle: Double Strike!	Eastasiasoft, Zoo Corporation	Nintendo Switch	
2022	Breakneck City	Eastasiasoft	PS4	
2022	Genkai Tokki: Seven Pirates H	Felistella	Nintendo Switch	
2022	Mooseman	Morteshka	PS Vita	
2022	Pretty Girls Breakout!	Zoo Corporation	Nintendo Switch	
2022	Senses: Midnight	Suzaku Games	Microsoft Windows, Nintendo Switch, PS4, PS5, Xbox One, Xbox Series X/S	
2022	Sword and Fairy: Together Forever	Softstar Entertainment	PS4, PS5	
2022	Super Woden GP	ViJuDa	Nintendo Switch, PS4, PS5, Xbox One, Xbox Series X/S	
2023	BROK the InvestiGator	COWCAT Games	PS5	
2023	Burrow of the Fallen Bear	Male Doll	Nintendo Switch, PS4, PS5	
2023	Mugen Souls	Compile Heart	Nintendo Switch	
2023	Mugen Souls Z	Compile Heart	Nintendo Switch	
2023	Omen of Sorrow	AOne Games	Microsoft Windows, Nintendo Switch, PS5	
2023	Pretty Girls 2048 Strike	Zoo Corporation	Nintendo Switch, PS4, PS5	
2023	Pretty Girls Tile Match	Zoo Corporation	Nintendo Switch, PS4, PS5	
2023	Sword and Fairy Inn 2	Softstar Entertainment, CubeGame	Nintendo Switch	
2023	Xuan-Yuan Sword: Mists Beyond the Mountains	Softstar Entertainment	Nintendo Switch	
2024	Dreamcutter	Ten Pennyfingers	Nintendo Switch	
2024	Pretty Girls Escape PLUS	Zoo Corporation	Nintendo Switch, PS4, PS5	
