= Auriea Harvey & Michaël Samyn =

Video game artists

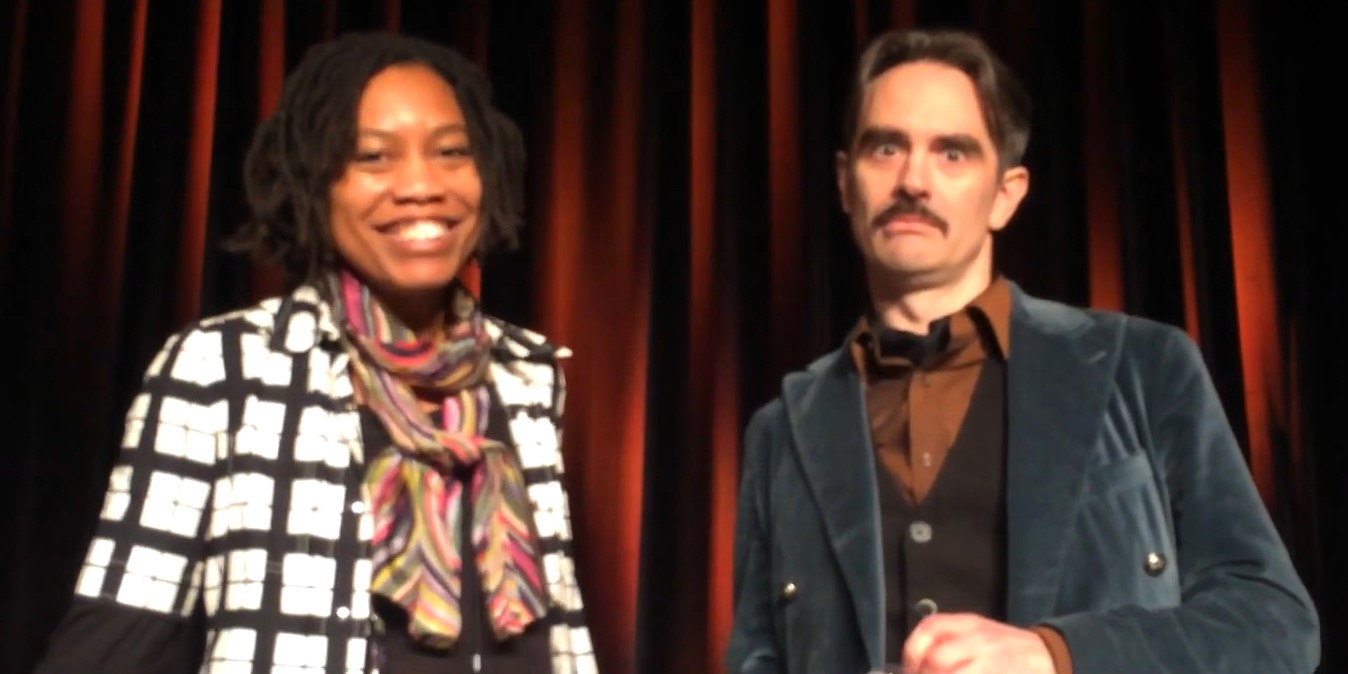
Harvey and Samyn at the 2014 Game Developers Conference

Auriea Harvey and Michaël Samyn are artists who collaborate on creating art video games, most prominently as Tale of Tales. From 2018 to 2024, Harvey was Professor of Games at the Kunsthochschule Kassel.

== Early life ==
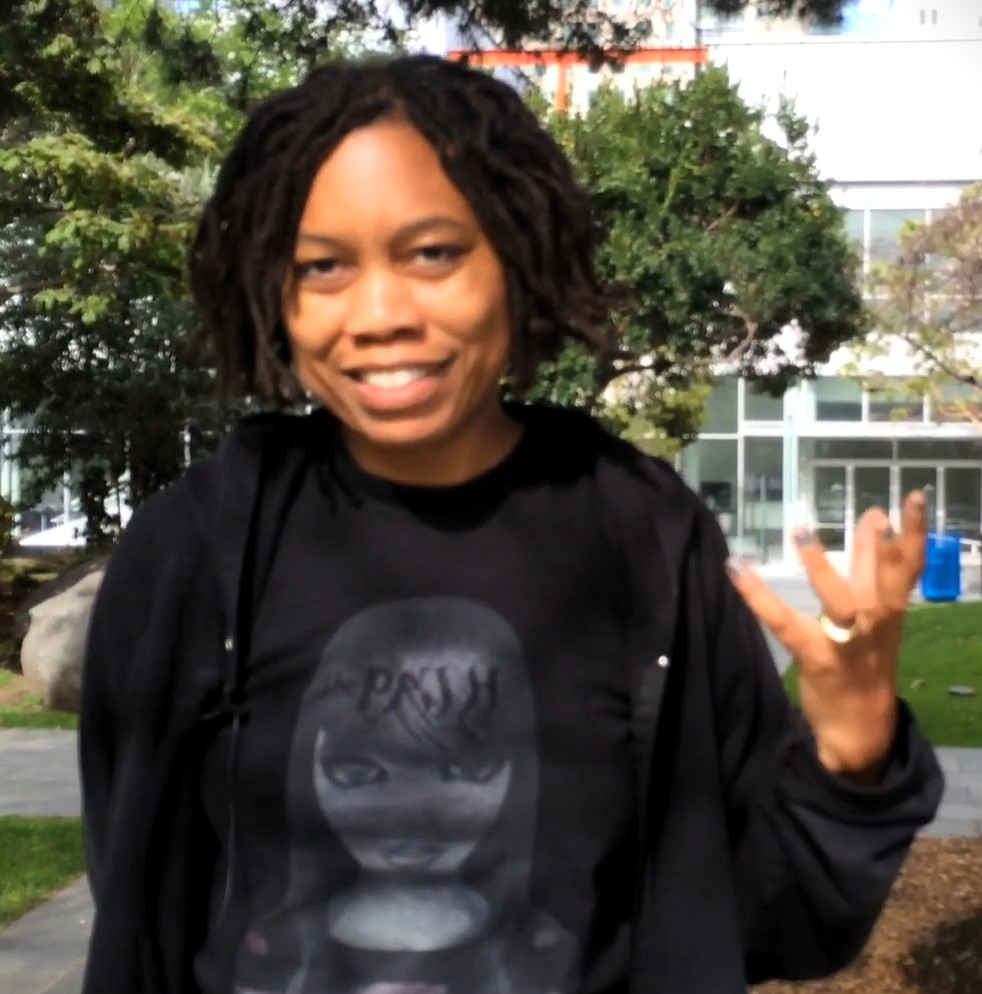
Harvey at the 2014 Game Developers Conference

Auriea Harvey is an American artist who was born in Indianapolis in 1971. During her high school years, she developed an interest in sketching and painting. While at Parsons School of Design University, she created art using Photoshop and experimented with different materials. Originally wanting to study painting, she ultimately studied sculpture. She graduated with a B.F.A. in sculpture from Parsons School of Design.

Michaël Samyn is a Belgian artist and programmer who was born in 1968 in Poperinge, Belgium.

== Career ==
In 1995, Harvey founded Entropy8, a website experimenting with interactivity and the functions of net art. In 1999, she merged her site with Zuper, by fellow artist and designer Michaël Samyn (whom she subsequently married) to create Entropy8Zuper! During this period, they created works such as The Godlove Museum, a website that showcased their storytelling strengths by merging Biblical stories with narratives drawn from their own lives and contemporary culture. Harvey has also designed websites for Virgin Records America and PBS.

Harvey and Samyn left net art for videogames in the early 2000s, when they felt that the web was becoming too much like a shopping mall. In 2002, they founded Tale of Tales, an independent game development studio in Ghent, Belgium, with the goal of creating games of greater emotional engagement and imaginative richness than the kinds of things that were being made for the then-major demographic of teenage boys. For a while Auriea was living in New York and Michaël in Belgium, and during this period they created Wirefire, a multimedia software interface that allowed them to communicate in a way that they considered less predictable and more creative than either chat or video.

Harvey and Samyn work as a team, although each has areas of specialization: Harvey in computer graphics and 3D modeling, Samyn in programming and sound. Together they have produced eight art video games including Fatale, The Graveyard, The Path, and The Endless Forest. They have become known for a distinctive visual style and unusual approaches to both narrative and game play.

After the commercial failure of Sunset, their most recent game, the pair gave up on video games to devote the rest of their lives to art. Their first post-games project was Cathedral-in-the-Clouds. Samyn converted to Catholicism in early 2021.

In 2016, Harvey developed an interest in 3D printing. Because of her passion for creating 3D models for video games, she was able to combine it with virtual reality installations.

== Games ==
The Graveyard is a simple video game in which the player takes on the role of an old woman in a graveyard who walks around before eventually leaving. In the full version of the game, there is a small chance that the old woman will die before leaving.

The Path was inspired by some versions of the fairy tale Little Red Riding Hood. Players must choose one of six sisters as an avatar and make their way to their grandmother's house. If they wander off the path, they will encounter the Wolf, and the phase of the game that takes place once the player reaches the grandmother's house changes substantially. When all six sister characters have been played to the point of encountering the Wolf, a seventh character becomes playable: a mysterious little girl in a white dress. For this game, Harvey modeled and experimented with polygons using a game engine.

The Endless Forest is a massively multiplayer online role-playing game without set goals, in which all the players exist as deer in a quiet forest. Players are represented in the game not by usernames but by icons of their deer avatars. They may not communicate with each other using language (text or voice) but instead must use the deer's body language. A unique feature of this game is that it can be played as a screensaver when users are not active on their computers.

Harvey and Samyn's most recent game, Sunset (2015), has players in a fictional South American city in the midst of a revolution. Unlike in many games, the player is not a warrior or a savior, but a housekeeper, a strategy that focuses attention on the difficult lives of civilians under conditions of war. The protagonist of the game is Angela Burnes, an African-American engineer who emigrated from the United States to the fictional South American town of San Bavón in the republic of Anchuria in search of a good life, and instead wound up cleaning the ultra-modernist penthouse of a wealthy man in a war zone. The game takes place in the 1970s, and the artwork for the game is sparely minimalist. As a housekeeper, the player is kept inside the apartment and allowed to carry out mostly small actions that do not seem to hold much promise of changing things, such as writing notes or switching the employer's radio station to a pirate channel. The team funded the game partially through a Kickstarter campaign. Tale of Tales ultimately characterized Sunset as a commercial failure.

== Exhibitions ==
The earliest public release of Harvey's work was in 1999 when she participated in Gallery 9, an online gallery of the Walker Art Center.

In 2000, she exhibited in "The Last Real Net Art Museum", an online exhibition focusing on internet art.

Since then she and Samyn have appeared in various exhibitions such as the Absolut L.A. International Biennial, 010101 (SFMOMA), ALT+CTRL Festival of Independent and Alternative Games (Beall Center, Irvine, CA), Tardis (Provincial Archeological Museum, Belgium), Edge Conditions (San Jose Museum of Art), WoW (Laguna Art Museum), Art History of Games (High Museum of Art), and the Neoludica Biennial (Venice, Italy).

The solo show "Year Zero" ran from March 6 through April 24, 2021 in Bitforms Gallery.

Art SG 2023 from January 10 to 20, 2023, "In Auriea Harvey's presentation of works from 2021, sculpture exists in both the digital (The Mystery v5-dv1 (gold stack)) and physical realms (The Mystery v5). Symbolic imagery evoking concepts of Memento Mori is found in the skull (bone), a face (nature), a rose (beauty), and a braid (death). Using self-portraiture, Harvey is inserting an African-American woman into art history, an overdue revision of the narrative"

== Awards ==
The team's awards include the Emerging Grant (1999), SFMOMA Prize for Excellence in Online Art (2000), the European Innovative Games Award (2008), the Creative Capital Emerging Fields Award (2006) and the Advanced Prize in Innovative Game Design (2010).

== Publications ==
- Harvey, Auriea, and Michaël Samyn. "Realtime art manifesto." Gaming realities: the challenge of digital culture, mediaterra festival of Art and Technology, Athens (2006).
- Harvey, Auriea, and Michael Samyn. "Over games." SMARTech website, Georgia Institute of Technology (2010).
