= The Endless Forest =

2005 video game

- Developer: Tale of Tales
- Publisher: Tale of Tales
- Designers: Auriea Harvey; Michaël Samyn
- Artist: Lina Kusaite
- Composers: Jan Verschoren; Gerry De Mol
- Platform: Microsoft Windows
- Release: December 9, 2005
- Genre: Multiplayer online game
- Modes: Single-player, Multiplayer

The Endless Forest is a multiplayer online game for Microsoft Windows by Belgian studio Tale of Tales. In the game, the player is a deer in a forest without direct goals or the ability to chat with other players. Pictograms above player's heads represent their names. Players communicate with one another through sounds and body language.

== Gameplay ==
The player begins the game as a fawn. In a little over a month, the deer grows up and becomes a stag. Common activities include exploring the forest, eating, drinking water, and sleeping under trees. There are also social activities that deer commonly engage in, such as dancing, pool parties, hide and seek, and tag.

Abiogenesis is a mechanic that allows the developers to intervene directly on the game environment, and allows them to change things in real time. It is an event that either happens randomly, or is organized in advance. For example, cages can fall from the sky, disco balls and soap bubbles will pop up.

Forest Magic is the main way to change the appearance of one's avatar, but the player cannot change their own appearance. Other players must cast spells on them in order to change their appearance, and it is up to the player to communicate and ask others to change their appearance for them.

There is no player chat in The Endless Forest. Deer display the actions of the player above their heads in order to communicate with each other.

== Setting ==
The Endless Forest consists of seven main areas: First Forest, Birch Forest, the Ruin, the Pond, the Old Oak, the Playground and the Twin Gods Statue.

=== The First Forest ===
The First Forest was the first part of the forest to be created, as well as the only section originally released. Its flora consists of poppies, hyacinths, and ferns, while the fauna consists of doves, butterflies, fireflies, and squirrels. Butterflies are seen floating over the hyacinths in the daytime, while fireflies replace them when it becomes nighttime.

=== The Birch Forest ===
The Birch Forest (double the size of the First Forest) was introduced in Phase 3. It added more land to roam and explore, as well as new visuals and sounds. The Birch Forest consists of birch trees and sycamores, blue berries and little birds. With the addition of the Birch Forest, little birds can now also rest upon the deer antlers if the player is very quiet. The grass in the Birch Forest is much taller compared to that of the rest of the forest.

=== The Ruin ===
The Ruin was created as part of an exhibition in Phase 1. Exhibition curator Michel Dewilde invited Tale of Tales to contribute to the fourth edition of the yearly Ename Actueel group art exhibition (September 1, 2005 to October 30, 2005) organized by the Provincial Archeological Museum in the small town of Ename in Belgium. When it was first created, its main focus was on Tardis, a time-and-space-travel device featured in the Doctor Who television series.

After that, the base of the ruin was introduced, resembling the archeological site of a gothic Saint Salvator church. During the exhibition visitors could steer a deer through the forest like the online players can. But when they stopped playing and the deer went to sleep, the soul of this visitor escaped and started floating through the forest. If the player found a soul, a new button would appear in the action strip which could be used to convert this pagan soul. If the players did a good enough job by the end of the day, a grave would be erected near the ruin. If the players failed and the majority of the remaining souls were still unchristened, a pagan idol would show up. Every day of the exhibition, a grave or an idol was added. The size depended on the number of visitors of that day. Now that the exhibition and Tardis is over, the ruins stand exactly as they have been created, left to be seen by the current forest players. Today nothing remains of the once large stone building but its foundations.

=== The Pond ===
The Pond was released in Phase 1.5. It was the premiere location for the first ever ABIOGENESIS. Weeping willows, frogs, lily pads, the occasional flower, and some brightly coloured koi fish make up the pond location.

Falling into the pond will cause any deer to lose all of its magic. Without careful footing, all of the players' hard earned spells could be lost to the water. The pond splits off into a small river, over which a small bridge has been built. One of the secrets of the forest is the idea of how the bridge came to being.

Further down the river is the Crying Idol, named for the waterfalls flowing from the statue's eyes. Little red poppies grow around the idol. Players will also get a treat if they end up passing into the idol. Running through the idol will cause the deer to turn red. This red pelt will prohibit other deer from casting more magic onto anyone who wears it, but can easily be 'sneezed' off when they want to get spells again.

=== The Old Oak ===
The Old Oak is a large, hollowed-out tree where deer come to rest, relax and rejuvenate. It is a comfortable place. Often when it is raining in the Forest, deer can be seen sleeping in the warm Old Oak. The Old Oak's most notable trait is the low humming sound emitted when the player travels close enough to it.

=== The Playground ===
The Playground was released in Phase 3, and was given its name by the players on the community forum. The Playground consists of three large boulders and many other rocks. Deer have the ability to walk, climb and jump over the rocks. If a deer sits quietly enough, little birds will perch on the deer's antlers, but they will fly away upon player induced movement of the deer.

Sometimes candles appear on all three boulders, allowing the deer to place candles on their antlers.

==== The Deermuda Triangle ====
There is a set of three suitcase-shaped rocks arranged in a triangle formation nicknamed "The Deermuda Triangle". The area was named by the community, and is not considered an official area of the forest. Some players claim that mysterious things happen in this area, while others have spent time there and come out without any harm done.

The Deermuda has become widely accepted by players. Game creator Michaël Samyn commented, "We think that's great. It is exactly how we see storytelling in games: we plant some seeds but the players grow the flowers."

=== The Twin Gods Statue ===
The Twin Gods Statue is central to all ABIOGENESIS performances. During an ABIOGENESIS the two halves of the statue separate and follow the creators' avatars through the forest. A player can activate the ABIOGENESIS camera, which focuses on the Twin Gods statue, by pressing the keys CTRL + W. In addition, if a player uses the 'pray' action at the Twin Gods statue the deer avatar receives a temporary devout pelt. Players will often leave their deer avatars sleeping next to the Twin Gods statue.

=== De Drinkplaats ===
De Drinkplaats (The Watering Hole) is a magical place where deer gather to drink from an endlessly running source. When the player enters the ring of mushrooms, all pelts and masks are shed and the player becomes one with nature. The more players gather, the more forest animals come to witness the idyllic scene. Drinking from the water turns the deer into one of these animals, of varying sizes. Two new animals were introduced for De Drinkplaats: a white rabbit and a black crow.

De Drinkplaats was added to The Endless Forest in response to a commission by Christophe De Jaeger for the Fantastic Illusions exhibition. Fantastic Illusions is a show of work by contemporary Chinese and Belgian artists that refers to the romantic desire to step into a picture and become immersed in it ("Die Sehnsucht, im Bild zu sein"). The exhibition ran in the Shanghai MoCA from September to October 2009, where visitors played The Endless Forest on two computers installed especially for the exhibit. The installation opened in the Kortrijk Broelmuseum in November 2009. The Broelmuseum has a fine collection of 16th-century paintings by the Flemish painter Roelandt Savery, and one of Savery's paintings, entitled "De Drinkplaats" (The Watering Hole), served as the direct inspiration for this addition to the Forest. The actual shape of the fountain was taken from a real-life watering hole in the garden of the museum.

=== The Ones Who Came Before Us ===
Many objects in the forest are clearly sculpted from stone. Examples include the idol of the man at the source of the river, The Ruins, the graves, the cage beside the ruins, the bridge and the forest god statues. Who or what created these artifacts is a mystery. The game creators have yet to respond to queries into the origin of these items, or to the possibility of creatures in addition to the deer living out of sight.

== Development ==
The creators of The Endless Forest strived to create an artistic game, a moving painting. Dubbed by its developers as a "multiplayer online game and social screensaver", The Endless Forest is not a mainstream MMORPG – it is highly unlike other MMORPGs The most notable difference between The Endless Forest and other MMORPGs is the lack of violence and human communication (talking) in-game.

=== Phase One ===
The game's prototype was originally commissioned by the Musee d'Art Moderne Grand-Duc Jean, Luxembourg, in 2003. Phase One was first released on September 12, 2005. This Phase included the Ruins and the ability to hop. On February 7, 2006, the streaming beta and beta screensaver version 1.5 was released, with the special addition of ABIOGENESIS. On February 13, an update of the beta version, version 1.5 beta 12, was released. It was in this version that the Pond was first introduced into the forest. It was then that the first series of ABIOGENESIS occurred on the February 15, 16 and 18 during the ARTEFACT festival in Leuven.

=== Phase Two ===
2 months later, Phase Two was launched on April 26, 2006, with greatly improved graphics and sound. With the release of Phase Two came the use of Forest Magic, the ability to change the avatar's appearance, a handful of emotes to express oneself, a giant tree known as the Old Oak, and an update to the ABIOGENESIS system. On September 29, 2006, version 2.1 was released and of the most important features of the game, the Fawn, was added. The Fawn was created for Pixel Me, a traveling art exhibition for young teenagers in Belgium. The show ran from October 2006 to November 2008, stopping in cultural centers across the country. On January 16, 2007, the artistic game project reached 10,000 registered players and had been downloaded over 64,000 times since its first release in September 2005. During this time The Endless Forest was being supported by Musée d’Art Moderne Grand-Duc Jean in Luxemburg, Vlaams Audiovisueel Fonds and Design Vlaanderen. On June 21, 2007, the players said goodbye to Phase 2 with the last ABIOGENESIS of the phase. It was during this Summer Solstice ABIOGENESIS that The Endless Forest experienced a record breaking attendance, over 80 deer at one time, much more than the little server could handle.

=== Phase Three ===
The Phase 3 beta was released in late August 2007, when the game jumped to over 100,000 downloads and 17,000 registered players, the number of active players per month exceeding 1,500. On September 24, 2007, Phase 3 was officially released for download. In this version, new players began playing as fawns for a little over a month, which after that they grew into full grown stags. It was also in this phase that two new areas were created; The Birch Forest and The Playground, consisting of a bunch of large boulders. Phase 3 was also the first to be created with Quest3D. On October 24, 2007, The Endless Forest crossed 20,000 registered players and over 100,000 downloads. Version 3.1 was released for Halloween, which consisted of 3 new sets (the Day of the Dead Set, the Crying Mask Set, and the Zombie Deer Set) so players could dress up for the spooky holiday. Version 3.2 was released in honour of Mardi Gras, where 8 new sets, designed by players and textured by students at the Howest college in Kortrijk, Belgium were added to the game. Since January 16, 2012, the latest Version 3.41 is available. On March 9, 2008, The Endless Forest reached 25,000 registered players and was downloaded almost 200,000 times Despite the game's growing popularity, the funding was becoming a problem. The game's funding was denied by Flemish Audiovisual Fund again, it had been denied in Phase 3 as well, leaving Tale of Tales with no possible way of applying for funding in Belgium. Development of The Endless Forest was at a standstill while Tale of Tales worked on their new game, The Path—which itself has been partly supported by the Flemish Ministry of Culture, and was released on March 18, 2009.

=== Future plans ===
Auriea Harvey and Michaël Samyn have general plans for what The Endless Forest is to become. They plan to continue the development of The Endless Forest in a way that suits themselves and their players. All plans go through the players to get their feedback and reaction. The game is based hugely on community involvement.

The general plan states:

"There's two main facets to the interaction design of The Endless Forest. On the one hand, it is sort of a magical deer-RPG or simulation game and on the other a stage for virtual performances (kind of an extreme form of Dungeon Mastering).

You are a stag
Every player starts the game as a young male deer. An older female (your mother) will guide you through the beginning of the game. As you keep playing, you will grow and your antlers will take on a unique shape.
There will be magical spells to acquire in the forest. A peculiarity of these is that you cannot cast them on yourself. Only on other deer. These spells can make the game a lot more interesting, so it will be important to find someone who can cast them on you.
Your deer avatar will live for a full year. If you want to continue playing with all the abilities you've gathered, you will need to procreate. There are plenty of attractive hinds in the forest. Perhaps you can persuade them. But better make sure you chase away your competitors with those awesome antlers of yours.

We are god
Every once in a while we, Auriea Harvey & Michaël Samyn, the authors and directors of this project, will intervene with one thing or another. Sometimes this may be an elaborate intrusion or addition that impacts life in the forest dramatically. At other times, small things will be added. This way, the forest will remain a living universe where you never know what to expect.
There will also be live events. Often things that are tied to real-life performances or exhibitions. Usually a remainder of these occasions will be left in the forest, but it will be most interesting to witness and participate in the event when it happens."

=== Remake ===
In 2016, the developers launched a crowdfunding campaign to remake The Endless Forest using the Unreal Engine. The first beta of the remake was released in April 2022.

== Reception ==
Since its first release, The Endless Forest has received much positive feedback from the public. The Endless Forest has been invited to exhibitions such as Le Cube Festival, Game/Play, Bradford Animation Festival, IETM Autumn Plenary Meeting, VELOCITY festival, Play Cultures, Els límits de la natura ("The Limits of Nature") at Centre d'Art La Panera, Gameworld at LABoral Centro de Arte y Creación Industriale, Night Garden at Mediamatic, Mediaterra, Pixel Me, Edge Conditions at the San Jose Museum of Art, and more. In addition, The Endless Forest has been featured in many magazines, such as German gaming magazine, GEE, as well as the Pittsburgh Post-Gazette. Game also has been featured in TV programs, such as "Bez Vinta" on Gameland TV. Other remarks center upon the game's unfinished nature, as well as hope for what may lie in store for the future.

1 in 5 players discovered the game through fanart posted on deviantART.

The Endless Forest has received negative feedback relating to its lack of traits considered essential to MMO games, and to video games in general.
