= Luxuria Superbia =

2013 video game

- Steam header art
- Developer: Tale of Tales
- Designer: Michaël Samyn, Auriea Harvey
- Writer: Michaël Samyn
- Composer: Walter Hus
- Platforms: Windows; Mac; Linux; iOS; Android; Ouya
- Release: 5 November 2013
- Mode: Single-player

Luxuria Superbia is a 2013 video game developed by Tale of Tales for computer and mobile platforms. It is an erotic video game in which players use controls to stimulate flower-like tunnels as a metaphor for sexual arousal. Following release, Luxuria Superbia received average reviews from critics, with praise directed to the uniqueness of its concept, design, and use of touch controls, and criticism to the lack of variety or incentive to complete levels. The game also won the Nuovo Award at the Independent Games Festival, and was a finalist at IndieCade. The game has received academic interest in its use of touch controls to create an abstract and tactile representation of sexual pleasure within the video game medium.

== Gameplay ==
The objective of the game is to interact with buds on the walls of a flowerlike tunnel.

Players navigate through the inner stems of flowers, represented by a long narrow tunnel. The game features twelve levels, which can be accessed by selecting the corresponding pillar on the main menu once completed. Once in a level, players use the mouse on computer or touchscreen on mobile devices to "caress" the petals on the segments of the tunnel. Exciting the buds of the flowers will raise the "delight score", reflected by visual and auditory feedback, including changes to the color and movement of the tunnel walls, flowers, and sound effects. As the score grows, the game requires players to pace the intensity of their input, as over-caressing the flowers can end the level early, and text prompts such as "touch me" or "keep going" appear and fade.

Progress is measured by filling a border at the edge of the screen with color. Once the delight score is sustained at a high enough level, the visuals escalate to represent orgasm. The player earns a gold, silver, or bronze medal based on the score they received, and the next level is unlocked for play if a gold medal was received. After the climax, the game displays a white screen with text commenting on their performance, and invites the player to "let go and let the climax subside for a more playful game". The player completes the game by receiving all three ring ratings for the game's twelve levels.

== Development ==
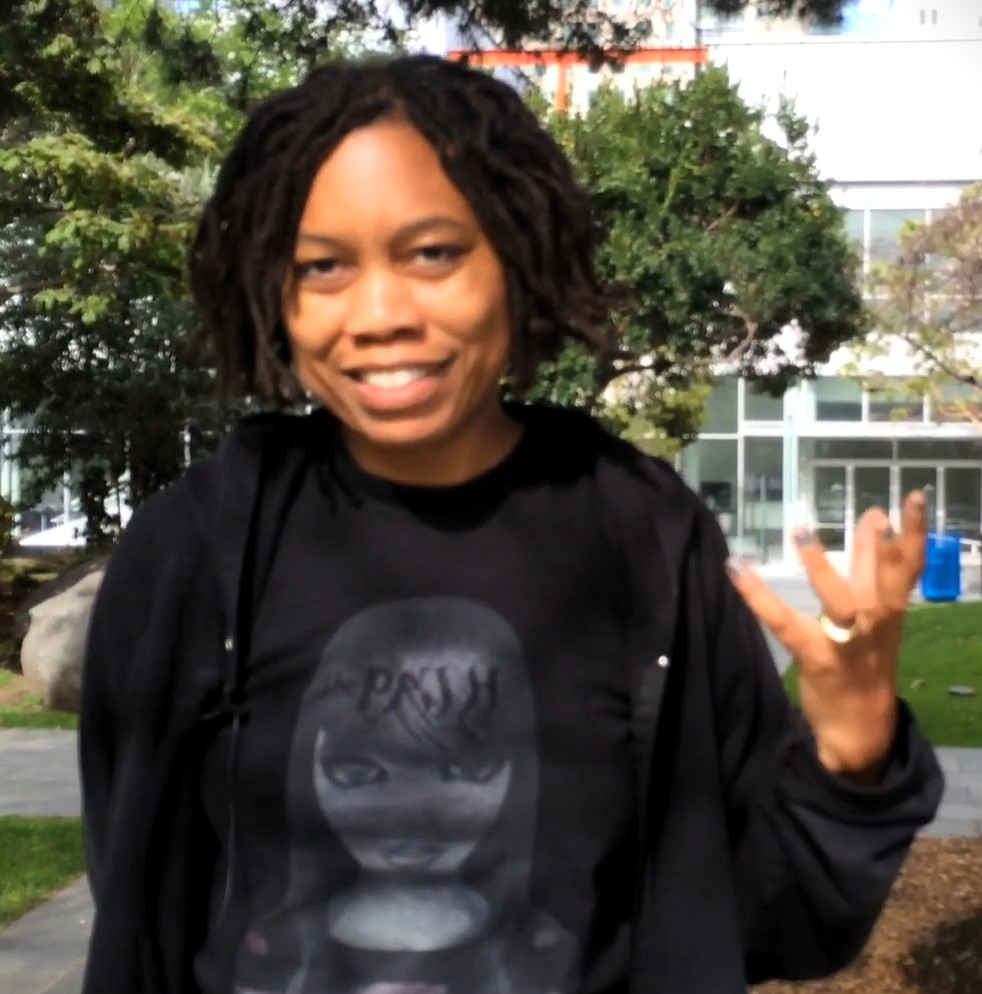
Co-developer Auriea Harvey at the 2014 Game Developers Conference

Luxuria Superbia was created by independent Belgian developer Tale of Tales, the studio formed by Auriea Harvey & Michaël Samyn. Presenting a panel at the Game Developers Conference, Harvey and Samyn were asked by co-panellist Brenda Romero about the representation of sex in videogames as a mechanic. This conversation prompted the developers to commence a blog named Cntcrc to collect imagery as a "prototyping project" for the game that would become Luxuria Superbia. On the blog, they collated imagery exploring the allegorical links between sex and ornamentation. The developers cited the paintings of Georgia O'Keeffe as instrumental to the decision to "fuse human sensuality with the shapes of flowers", also being inspired by the paintings of Aimei Ozaki, the game Noby Noby Boy, and the work Strange Rain by Erik Loyer. The game's title is derived from Latin terms for deadly sins: luxuria to describe lust, and superbia to describe pride. Walter Hus composed the game's soundtrack.

The developers attempted several iterations of the concept, including attempts to set the game in space, but settled on taking a playful, humorous approach focusing on flowers. This tone was a departure from the darker, narrative tone of earlier works, to create a game that would provide people access to feelings of "joy and beauty". Originally, the game was created with the gamepad as the intended interface, as Harvey and Samyn considered the "sterile feel of the glass screen didn't seem compatible with the sensuality" they hoped to evoke. Development of the game was supported by the Flanders Audiovisual Fund. The game was released on 5 November for Windows, Mac, Linux, iOS, Android and Ouya.

== Reception ==
Reception

Aggregate score
Aggregator	Score
Metacritic	66%

Review scores
Publication	Score
GameSpot	5/10
TouchArcade	4/5
148Apps	3.5/5
AppSpy	4/5
Digitally Downloaded	5/5

According to review aggregator Metacritic, Luxuria Superbia received "mixed or average reviews". Critics described the game's premise as original and experimental. Andrew Webster of The Verge described the game's "clear" allusions to "universal themes and love and sex", and labelled the gameplay as "perfectly suited for touch" and its mechanics as "learned more through experimentation than overt directions". Leigh Alexander of Slate praised the game's "genre-defying" concept and its "delightfully organic" design, and commented on themselves as "focused on touch", alongside the design and color of the game. Some critics considered the game lacked incentive. Despite the "unusual premise", Cameron Woolsey of GameSpot felt the game lacked variety and incentive to complete stages, and said the "tiresome and repetitive" gameplay failed to offer "anything new beyond its simple concept". Similarly, Graham Smith of Rock Paper Shotgun stated the game could get "quickly boring" after understanding the game's core mechanics, as the levels did not become more interesting and challenging. Digitally Downloaded interpreted the game's lack of obvious incentive or reward for play was part of its concept, and a commentary on the motivations of players to earn points instead of tangible experiences.

Many reviewers reflected that the game contained obvious innuendo. AppSpy reviewer Dave Flodine expected players would have little doubt of the game's "sexual connotations" and "less-than-subtle metaphor". Smith praised the game's "playful visual metaphors" and "brilliant colors" allowed the game to convey a "meditative experience". Many critics considered the effect of the gameplay had a reduced impact on platforms without touch controls.

=== Academic ===
Several writers and academics have discussed the game's qualities as an erotic video game, and some described the game as an exemplary use of touch-based gameplay. Clough states that these controls demonstrate interactions unique to video games to explore "the tactility of sexual play", and that it uses the "distance between player and medium" to create an abstract representation, with touch breaking the barriers of "distance between player and medium", creating an abstract representation. Clough stated the game demonstrates that "there are plenty of ways to explore touch as a game mechanic in ways that are explicitly, implicitly, or abstractly about sex, sensuality, and pleasure". Other writers also noted the abstract nature of the game's sexual themes.

Other writers have also praised the game's representation of sexual pleasure through gameplay. Varhidi and Rauhut praise the game's encouragement of "exploration of sexual interactions beyond the orgasm" and "going to great lengths to highlight the aspect of playfulness and pleasure" in sex. Similarly, Vitali states that the game's "effect of sense" from its touch interaction is effective because there is "continually a dialogue between the player's way to caress the flower and the feedback received" through "coherent sounds and visual effects". Jagoda discusses that the game's representation of sex "is not simply about sex in a thematic way nor does it contain sex as a reward or aesthetic effect", but an "experience" that invites the player to think, feel, and understand the "flows and forces" of sexual play.

=== Accolades ===
Luxuria Superbia received the Nuovo Award at the 16th Independent Games Festival in 2014. The game was also selected as a finalist of IndieCade 2013, and showcased at the 2014 Game Developers Conference in March 2014. The game was also a nominee at the 2014 A MAZE. Berlin festival.
