= Zoo Corporation =

Japanese company

- Native name: 株式会社ズー
- Romanized name: Kabushiki-gaisha Zū
- Company type: Kabushiki gaisha
- Industry: Software
- Founded: April 8, 1986; 40 years ago
- Headquarters: Ueda, Nagano
- Area served: Worldwide
- Number of employees: 85
- Website: zoo.co.jp

Zoo Corporation is a Japanese company based in Nagano Prefecture that develops medical prescription systems and video games.

== History ==
Zoo was founded on April 8, 1986 by Jinichi Miyajima. It developed a computer-based prescription system in 1987. In 1994 it released a prescription system named Gennai Online which also supported revisions to pharmaceutical information and automatic drug ordering. Yakugen is a drug database linked to Gennai, and MediCounter is a drug information system the company made for face-to-face sales.

In 1990 the company developed the first Japanese UNIX game. It was released in the United States by Spectrum Holobyte as BreakThru!.

== Video games ==
Title	Systems	Release date	Developer	Publisher	JP	NA	PAL	Notes
BreakThru!	Windows	1994	Yes	No	No	Yes	No	The game's concept was used for Bishōjo Senshi Sailor Moon S: Kurukkurin (Zoo is credited on the title screen).
BreakThru!	MS-DOS	1994	Yes	No	No	Yes	No	The game's concept was used for Bishōjo Senshi Sailor Moon S: Kurukkurin (Zoo is credited on the title screen).
Koi-Koi Japan [Hanafuda Playing Cards]	Windows	April 27, 2015	Yes	Yes	Yes	Yes	Yes	
Princess Kaguya: Legend of the Moon Warrior	Windows	August 4, 2015	Yes	Yes	Yes	Yes		
Pretty Girls Mahjong Solitaire	Windows	August 24, 2015	Yes	Yes	Yes	Yes	Yes	
Dungeon Manager ZV	Windows	September 28, 2015	No	Yes	Yes	Yes	Yes	Developed by StudioGIW
Pretty Girls Panic!	Windows, macOS	December 20, 2016	Yes	Yes	Yes	Yes	Yes	
Dungeon Manager ZV 2	Windows	February 17, 2017	No	Yes	Yes	Yes	Yes	Developed by StudioGIW
Dungeon Manager ZV: Resurrection	Windows	August 15, 2017	No	Yes	Yes	Yes	Yes	Developed by StudioGIW
Alvarok	Windows	August 24, 2017	No	Yes	Yes	Yes	Yes	Developed by StudioGIW
Beat Souls	Windows, NS, PS4, PS5, XBO, XSX	July 29, 2021	Yes	No	Yes	Yes	Yes	Published by eastasiasoft

=== Localized Games ===
Title	Systems	Japanese Release date	Original Developer	Original Publisher	Original Release date
Bermuda Syndrome	Windows	1995	Century Interactive	BMG Interactive	1995
Grand Theft Auto	Windows	January 23, 1998	DMA Design	BMG Interactive	October 1997
Moomin	Windows	January 27, 1998	BMG Interactive	BMG Interactive	1998
V2000	Windows	December 25, 1998	Frontier Developments	Grolier Interactive	August 1998
Grand Theft Auto: London 1969	Windows	July 1, 1999	Rockstar Canada	Rockstar Games	March 31, 1999
Grand Theft Auto 2	Windows	February 25, 2000	DMA Design	Rockstar Games	September 30, 1999
Grand Theft Auto III	Windows	June 28, 2002	Rockstar North	Rockstar Games	October 22, 2001
Nitro Family	Windows	June 11, 2004	Delphieye	Delphieye	May 1, 2004
Singles: Flirt Up Your Life	Windows	December 3, 2004	Rotobee	Deep Silver	April 2, 2004
Knights of Honor	Windows	May 25, 2005	Black Sea Studios	Sunflowers Interactive	September 30, 2004
Singles 2: Triple Trouble	Windows	December 16, 2005	Rotobee	Deep Silver	May 27, 2005
City Life	Windows	July 28, 2006	Monte Cristo	Focus Home Interactive	May 12, 2006
S.T.A.L.K.E.R.: Shadow of Chernobyl	Windows	June 1, 2007	GSC Game World	GSC World Publishing	March 20, 2007
Pacific Storm: Allies	Windows	July 27, 2007	Lesta Studio	Buka Entertainment	May 25, 2007
Breed	Windows	August 20, 2007	Brat Designs	Cdv Software Entertainment	March 19, 2004
S.T.A.L.K.E.R.: Clear Sky	Windows	September 26, 2008	GSC Game World	GSC World Publishing	August 25, 2008
GTR Evolution	Windows	September 26, 2008	SimBin Studios	Take-Two Interactive	September 1, 2008
Left 4 Dead	Windows	November 21, 2008	Valve South	Valve	November 17, 2008
Tomb Raider: Underworld	Windows	July 17, 2009	Crystal Dynamics	Eidos Interactive	November 18, 2008
Left 4 Dead 2	Windows	November 19, 2009	Valve	Valve	November 17, 2009
The Path	Windows	July 7, 2010	Tale of Tales	Tale of Tales	March 18, 2009
