= Trigger Witch =

2021 video game

- Developer: Rainbite
- Publishers: Eastasiasoft; Rainbite
- Platforms: PlayStation 4; PlayStation 5; Xbox One; Xbox Series X/S; Nintendo Switch; Windows
- Release: PS4, Xbox One: 28 July 2021; Nintendo Switch: 29 July 2021; Windows: 27 May 2022
- Genres: Action-adventure; Twin-stick shooter
- Modes: Single-player, local co-op

Trigger Witch is a 2021 action-adventure twin-stick shooter developed by Rainbite and published by Eastasiasoft. The game is set in a fantasy world in which firearms have replaced traditional magic. Trigger Witch was released on PlayStation 4 and Xbox One on 28 July 2021, followed by Nintendo Switch on 29 July. The Windows version launched on Steam on 27 May 2022.

== Gameplay ==
Trigger Witch is a 2D top-down twin-stick shooter with action-adventure elements, drawing visual and structural comparisons to 16-bit-era titles such as The Legend of Zelda: A Link to the Past. Players control Colette, a young witch. Colette explores an open world, navigates dungeons and confronts enemy bosses. Movement is controlled by the left analog stick and aiming is controlled by the right.

Colette begins with a pistol and acquires additional firearms throughout the game, including a shotgun, sniper rifle, flamethrower and grenade launcher. Weapons can be upgraded and swapped using directional shortcuts or a radial menu. Most firearms have unlimited ammunition with a cooldown between clips, while the pistol functions as a sidearm when other weapons are unavailable. Enemies behave according to traditional role-playing game type classifications and include creatures themed around fruit, garlic and other unusual motifs.

The game supports drop-in local cooperative play for two players. Trigger Witch includes accessibility options that allow players to disable the game's blood and gore effects, as well as adjustable damage settings that affect both player and enemy hit points.

== Plot ==
Trigger Witch is set in Evertonia, a fantasy world in which firearms have replaced traditional witchcraft as the dominant form of power. The player controls Colette, an aspiring witch attending the Stock, an academy where students must pass a series of tests known as the Gauntlet in order to join the Clip, a group of gun-wielding witches who protect the realm. After Colette completes the Gauntlet, a mysterious figure known as the Man in Black emerges through a rift into the world, leading Colette on a quest to save her friends and family.

== Development ==
Trigger Witch was developed by Rainbite, an indie studio based in Auckland, New Zealand. The game was the studio's third project, following Reverie (2018) and Rym 9000 (2019). According to co-founder Jared Trail, fellow co-founder Daniel originally conceived the game's "witches with guns" premise, and the project was initially planned as a horizontal shoot-'em-up before being reworked into a larger twin-stick action-adventure.

Trigger Witch received four nominations at the New Zealand Game Awards prior to its release, in the categories of design, accessibility, narrative and overall production.

== Release ==
Eastasiasoft released Trigger Witch on PlayStation 4 and Xbox One on 28 July 2021, with the Nintendo Switch version following on 29 July. Versions for PlayStation 5 and Xbox Series X/S were released later, and the Windows version launched on Steam on 27 May 2022.

A physical edition for PlayStation 5 and Nintendo Switch was later announced by Eastasiasoft.

== Reception ==
Reception

Aggregate scores
Aggregator	Score
Metacritic	NS: 75/100; PS4: 76/100
OpenCritic	72/100

Review score
Publication	Score
Nintendo Life	6/10

According to review aggregator Metacritic, Trigger Witch received "generally favorable reviews" on both the Nintendo Switch and PlayStation 4 versions. On OpenCritic, the game was rated "Fair", holding an average score of 72/100 based on 25 critic reviews, with 56% of critics recommending the game.

Oliver Reynolds of Nintendo Life described the genre mashup as a successful combination that produced a "likeable and funny experience," and highlighted the game's accessibility options as a particular strength. Joshua Duckworth of Screen Rant wrote that the controls felt tight and that the game's broad weapon variety made combat satisfying. Reviewers at Hey Poor Player and ThisGenGaming likened the game to The Legend of Zelda for its overworld and dungeon structure.

Duckworth noted that few bosses or dungeons posed a meaningful challenge and that enemies came in too few visual forms to keep encounters fresh. Reynolds wrote that the game fell short of stronger genre contemporaries such as Enter the Gungeon. Robert Welch of Rapid Reviews UK and Duckworth also commented that the gameplay became repetitive.
