= Crawlco Block Knockers =

2019 video game

- Developer: CosmiKankei
- Publishers: Shady Corner Games (PC); Eastasiasoft (NS)
- Platforms: Nintendo Switch, PC
- Release: PC: WW: August 1, 2019; Nintendo Switch: WW: December 17, 2020; JP: March 18, 2021
- Genre: Puzzle
- Mode: Single-player

Crawlco Block Knockers is a 2019 action-puzzle video game developed by CosmiKankei for Nintendo Switch and Windows. The game involves matching blocks on a board which ultimately reveal a background image of sexually suggestive pixel-art.

== Gameplay ==
Gameplay screenshot

Crawlco Block Knockers is a puzzle game; the player takes the role of a green creature who joins the warehouse division of a company and is tasked with sorting colored blocks for shipping. Set on a board, the player pulls or kicks blocks that enter the field, attempting to match up with same-colored bricks, while simultaneously avoiding enemies. When a group of three or more blocks are successfully matched, they disappear from the board, revealing the background image, each depicting a woman in a pose and containing nudity. Ultimately this leads to the board area reducing in size. The adult content can be controlled by changing the game's "modesty" setting.

Touching an enemy once can be fatal, and additionally some enemies shoot bullets at the player. Enemies can be defeated by sliding a block at them. However, the game has the option of turning the enemies off entirely. There are four bosses in the game.

This game has been cited by Famitsu as being a mix of Pengo and Sokoban, with and territory capture system similar to Qix. The developers themselves have cited inspiration by 1990s lewd Japanese arcade games like the Gals Panic series.

== Development and release ==
Crawlco Block Knockers was released on the Steam platform in 2019, then on the Nintendo eShop in 2020. The music in the game was composed by Opus Science Collective or "OSC", a British synthpop/synthwave artist.

The game received a physical release for the Switch on June 25, 2021, in Europe, published by Funbox Media. This version features new exclusive character art and is bundled with a CD soundtrack.

In 2023, an LP format vinyl record of the soundtrack was released by Ship To Store Phonograph Company.

== Reception ==
Reception

Review scores
Publication	Score
Famitsu	29/40
Digitally Downloaded	4.5/5
MANiAC	60/100

Matt S. of Digitally Downloaded scored the game 4.5 out of 5. He called the game "really, really catchy" and has positive comments about the challenge it offered and its "groovy" soundtrack. The artwork of the women, which he described as "80's late-night vibe", was also praised. In Japan, Famitsu gave it 29 out of 40.
