= BreakThru! =

1994 video game

- Windows cover art with Alexey Pajitnov
- Developers: Zoo Corporation (Windows, MS-DOS); Artech (SNES, Genesis); Realtime Associates Seattle Division (Game Boy); Shoeisha (Saturn, PlayStation) Presage Software (Mac)
- Publishers: Spectrum HoloByte (Windows, MS-DOS, SNES, Game Boy); Shoeisha (Saturn, PlayStation)
- Designer: Steve Fry
- Platforms: Windows, Classic Mac OS, MS-DOS, Super NES, Game Boy, Genesis, Saturn, PlayStation
- Release: Windows: NA: 1994; MS-DOS: NA: 1994; Super NES: NA: June 1, 1994; Game Boy: NA: November 4, 1994; Saturn: JP: September 22, 1995; PlayStation: JP: December 1, 1995; Genesis: NA: July, 1996; (Sega Channel)
- Genre: Puzzle
- Modes: Single-player, multiplayer

BreakThru! (Note: Japanese: ブレイクスルー, Hepburn: BureikuSurū) is a tile-matching video game released for Windows and MS-DOS in 1994. It was created by Steve Fry for the Japanese company ZOO Corporation and published by Spectrum HoloByte for the North American market.

The game would later be re-released on a number of different platforms. In the same year, the game was ported for the Super NES and the original Game Boy. These two versions were developed by different companies and published by Spectrum HoloByte in North America. A year later, Shoeisha published the game in Japan for the Sega Saturn and PlayStation. A Genesis version was released in 1996 via Sega Channel.

== Gameplay ==
In the game, the player must move the cursor through a grid of different colored squares. All squares must be "removed", and squares can only be removed if they are directly touching two or more squares of the same color. Once squares are removed, blocks shift downward and to the left or right to fill in the blanks. The game ends when either all blocks are removed or time has run out.

If the player comes to a point in which none of the remaining squares match, a few options remain. A few "special items" help clear out blocks that do not necessarily match, such as an airplane block that eliminates a full line of squares in the direction it is pointed in, or a block of dynamite that blows up every square touching it. Additionally, the player can also choose to drop new, randomly generated squares into the equation.

== Development ==
The game is commonly attributed to being designed by Alexey Pajitnov, who also originally designed Tetris, and published by Spectrum HoloByte, the company who first published Tetris outside of Soviet Union, Pajitnov's home country. However, despite Pajitnov's name and face being on the game's title screen and box art, the PC version of the game clearly states that he only "endorses" and his only actual credits for the game is a "Special Thanks". It is a reworked version of a game called TheWALL that was also created by ZOO Corporation in 1994 and published by Arrow Micro-Techs Corp.

After being released for the MS-DOS and Super NES, the game was later ported to the original Game Boy. Because the game's original concept is so heavily based on matching same colored squares, the squares in this version of the game have different patterns within them to distinguish between different square types. Another version of the game, identical to the Super NES version, was made playable on the Genesis exclusively through the Sega Channel subscription service, which allowed subscribers to temporarily download games to their Genesis system for as long as the system was left on. Additionally, ports for the PlayStation and Sega Saturn were released exclusively in Japan. A version for Game Gear was planned but never released.

== Reception ==
Reception for the game was generally mixed. Reviewing the Game Boy version, GamePro praised a few aspects, such as the ability to reverse approaching blocks, but felt that the "eye-straining graphics" severely hamper the gameplay: "While Tetris has simple, easy-to-see shapes that fall individually, BreakThru! has a complex wall of tiny, hard-to-see bricks with special bricks and bombs that are sometimes difficult to identify." However, they commented that this problem is considerably alleviated when playing on the Super Game Boy. They gave a more positive review of the SNES version. Though they criticized some aspects of the graphics, they applauded the game's simple-to-learn yet strategically deep gameplay and variety of modes. Reviewing the SNES version, a Next Generation critic said it was "OK" but too derivative of Tetris to be of real interest. He remarked that the use of special objects complicates the gameplay without truly adding to it, and gave the game two out of five stars.

In a retrospective review of the SNES version, Honest Gamers appreciated the initial concept of the game, but criticized how it frequently degrades into slow and frustrating gameplay once none of the remaining squares match each other. Allgame stated that while the graphics and sound effects were "less than dazzling", the gameplay was praised, stating that it had "...that special Pajitnov mix of simplicity and strategy that makes for a compelling, addictive experience."
