= Super Woden GP =

2021 video game

- Steam header
- Developer: ViJuDa
- Publishers: ViJuDa (PC); Eastasiasoft (consoles)
- Composers: DJ Devito & Franikku
- Series: Super Woden
- Engine: Unity
- Platforms: Windows, Linux, Nintendo Switch, PlayStation 4, PlayStation 5, Xbox One, Xbox Series X/S
- Release: September 1, 2021 (PC); November 9, 2022 (consoles)
- Genre: Racing
- Modes: Single-player, multiplayer

Super Woden GP is a 2021 racing video game developed and published by ViJuDa as a sequel to Woden GP (2020). It received positive reviews. A sequel, Super Woden GP 2, was released in November 2023.

== Gameplay ==
Super Woden GP is a racing game depicted from an isometric perspective. The game features more than 70 cars from six manufacturers. While the cars are fictional, they are based on real car models. The races may take place on off-road or asphalt courses. In the rally courses the game gives directions before each corner. The races may occur at various times of day and weather conditions. Easy driving controls are available but times recorded while using them cannot be submitted to the online leaderboards. The main menu is depicted as a map, similar to the one featured in the Gran Turismo series where the player can visit manufacturer shops, car wash, and compete in races. Split screen multiplayer supports up to four players.

== Development ==
Development took one year, from September 2020 to its release in September 2021. The game was created in the developer’s spare time, as he was working in a non-gaming industry at the time. The soundtrack was composed by Frannikku and DJ DeVito. All other aspects of development were handled solely by the developer.

ViJuDa is a pseudonym for Víctor Justo Dacruz who is from Vigo, Spain. Woden GP (2020) was his first commercial game. It made around $2000 profit. Woden GP was taken down from Steam because Dacruz doesn't feel it represents the brand well because he considers it "a pretty mediocre, bad game". Super Woden GP matched the total sales of Woden GP within just the first day of its launch. Super Woden GP has sold over 46,000 units across all available platforms.

The sequel, Super Woden GP 2, incorporates 3D physics, in contrast to the 2D physics of Super Woden GP, enabling features such as jumps and slopes.

== Reception ==
Reception

Review scores
Publication	Score
M! Games	78/100
MeriStation	8/10
Vandal	8/10

M! Games said the game doesn't look as good as Circuit Superstars but liked the controls and the soundtrack. MeriStation said "Super Woden GP is the result of its creator’s deep passion and love for a particular vision of video games: isometric-perspective arcade racers. The controls were frustrating at first but wonderful when mastered. The graphics were said to evoke the style of Vincent van Gogh paintings. The soundtrack was compared to the era of arcade games from Sega and Namco. The artificial intelligence (AI) of the opponents was criticized as "too cold and surgical" and the career progression system was criticized for requiring too many races to be replayed." Vandal described the gameplay as "easy to play and difficult to master" and the soundtrack was praised for having "catchy rhythms". Criticisms included the basic opponent AI and because of the perspective, sometimes pieces of the scenery obscured parts of the track.

Super Woden GP was said to be similar to racing games from the 1990s, like the World Rally series (1993–95), Power Drive (1994), Super Skidmarks (1995), Neo Drift Out (1996), and Over Top (1996).
