= Waifu Uncovered =

2020 video game

- Physical release box art
- Developer: One-Hand-Free Studios
- Publishers: One-Hand-Free Studios (Win); Eastasiasoft (Switch)
- Platforms: Nintendo Switch, Windows
- Release: Windows: WW: April 10, 2020; Switch: WW: July 16, 2020
- Genre: Shoot 'em up
- Modes: Single-player, Multiplayer

Waifu Uncovered is a 2020 erotic shoot 'em up video game, developed by One-Hand-Free Studios, published by One-Hand-Free-Studios for Microsoft Windows and by Eastasiasoft for Nintendo Switch. The game revolves around stripping eight women by shooting at their clothes that have been infected by an alien virus. A follow-up was released in 2021, Waifu Discovered 2: Medieval Fantasy.

== Gameplay ==
Gameplay screenshot

In Waifu Uncovered, the player can choose from multiple ships each of which suit a different playing style. The player is tasked to shoot at the target women's clothes to "save" them from the infection while simultaneously destroying enemies. Every stage also contains a boss battle. The game also consists of an unlockable 'One Finger Mode'. The game is described as a "sexy and naughty" shmup, and contains a high amount of fanservice.

== Release and nudity violation ==
The game was released digitally on Steam and the Nintendo eShop. Just one day after release, the game was delisted from the eShop in Japan. This occurred after the discovery of exposed nipples during a split-second frame in the game. The Japanese version was censored and received an age rating of "D" by CERO (ages 17 and up), in which bare genitals are not allowed.

A physical release for Switch was released in Europe on November 20, 2020, by Funbox Media. It has the "fully uncensored" mode as opposed to the digital release.

== Reception ==
Reception

Aggregate score
| Aggregator | Score |
|---|---|
| Metacritic | 58/100 (NS) |

Review scores
| Publication | Score |
|---|---|
| Famitsu | 28/40 (NS) |
| Nintendo Life | 7/10 (NS) |
| MANiAC | 56% (NS) |
| Digitally Downloaded | 3.5/5 (NS) |

Waifu Uncovered on the Switch has "mixed or average" reviews according to aggregator Metacritic.

Nintendo Life wrote in its review "Waifu Uncovered has a laser-focused target audience and it caters perfectly to that audience. If you fall outside of that demographic, how much you'll enjoy this game will depend entirely on your receptiveness to hand-drawn, mildly lewd pinup-style art and puerile humour coupled with solid shoot 'em up action." In a later post, "it was largely puerile and immature, but the shmup mechanics sitting beneath the smut were actually quite solid".

== Sequel ==
A sequel was released named Waifu Discovered 2: Medieval Fantasy, released on July 29, 2021, on PC and later for Nintendo Switch. This game is set in an era featuring elves, demons and other mystical figures.
