= Mugen Souls =

2012 video game

- European game cover
- Developer: Compile Heart
- Publishers: JP: Compile Heart; NA: NIS America; EU: NIS Europe; WW: Ghostlight (PC); WW: Eastasiasoft (Switch)
- Director: Kenta Sugano
- Producers: Keiji Inafune; Norihisa Kochiwa
- Artist: Kei Nanameda
- Writers: Atsushi Ishizuka; Hikaru Sakai; Momoko Terajima
- Composer: Tenpei Sato
- Platforms: PlayStation 3, Microsoft Windows, Nintendo Switch
- Release: PlayStation 3: JP: March 22, 2012; EU: September 28, 2012; NA: October 16, 2012; Microsoft Windows: WW: October 22, 2015; Nintendo Switch: WW: September 14, 2023
- Genre: Role-playing
- Mode: Single-player

Mugen Souls (圧倒的遊戯 ムゲンソウルズ, Attōteki Yūgi Mugen Souruzu) is a Japanese role-playing video game developed by Compile Heart with collaboration from GCREST and published in North America and the PAL regions by NIS America. Certain aspects of the original Western release were edited and some mini-games were disabled.

A Nintendo Switch port, published by Eastasiasoft, was released in April 2023, with all of the content uncensored. A sequel titled Mugen Souls Z was released on April 25, 2013.

== Plot ==
The main protagonist of Mugen Souls, Chou-Chou, plans to conquer the universe by subjugating the seven worlds it comprises, as she thinks the planets look pretty. Traveling from world to world with her trusty companion Altis, and loyal peon Ryuto, Chou-Chou aims to turn the heroes and demon lords of each world into her 'peons' (servants), saving the world from conflict in the process.

== Gameplay ==
Gameplay revolves around exploration and turn-based, open-field combat (same as Hyperdimension Neptunia mk2 gameplay), and the game also includes mini games and customization.

== Release ==
The Nintendo Switch port was released by Eastasiasoft on April 27, 2023.

== Reception ==
Reception

Aggregate score
Aggregator	Score
Metacritic	PS3: 55/100

Review scores
Publication	Score
Famitsu	31/40
Game Informer	5.0/10
IGN	3.9/10

The game was met with mixed reviews. The PlayStation 3 version received "mixed or average" reviews according to review aggregator Metacritic.

== Sequel ==
Mugen Souls Z is the sequel to Mugen Souls, released in Japan on 25 April 2013, North America on 20 May 2014 and Europe on 23 May 2014 for the PlayStation 3. The protagonist is Syrma, a goddess aiming to stop an awkward ancient threat. Gameplay aspects include level caps of 9,999, large mecha, and billion-point damage. A Nintendo Switch port was released in September 2023 release.
