= Pretty Girls (video game series) =

Video game series

- Cover art for the game Pretty Girls Mahjong Solitaire
- Developer: Zoo Corporation
- Publishers: Zoo Corporation; Eastasiasoft (consoles)
- Platforms: Android, Microsoft Windows, Nintendo Switch, PlayStation 4, PlayStation 5
- First release: Mahjong Pretty Girls Battle; January 2015
- Latest release: Pretty Girls Pop Match; July 2024

Pretty Girls (Japanese: プリティガールズ) is a series of puzzle video games created and developed by Zoo Corporation. They are mostly based on various different tabletop games and feature heavy fanservice.

== Games ==
The first game, Mahjong Pretty Girls Battle, was released worldwide on the Steam platform for PCs on January 22, 2015. It is an authentic 4-player mahjong game against AI and there are a total of 23 "kawaii" characters to choose from, all fully voiced. On June 23, 2015, a second installment called Mahjong Pretty Girls Battle: School Girls Edition was released. It is the same game but with changed characters who all wear school uniforms. Zoo also released a Bundle Pack combining both of these into one release.

Gameplay screenshot of Pretty Girls Tile Match

Pretty Girls Mahjong Solitaire, released on August 25, 2015, is the first explicit game in the series. This game is based on the real-life board game of mahjong solitaire, and involves the character girls stripping as the player succeeds in the game. Poker Pretty Girls Battle: Texas Hold'em is set on a tropical resort and features a total of 16 girls. The game uses the rules of Texas hold'em. Delicious! Pretty Girls Mahjong Solitaire was released in 2016. The layout of the mountain of tiles is double that of the previous game. There are seven characters with one unlocked after completing. This was the first Pretty Girls game ported to consoles, in 2021, following a partnership between Zoo and Hong Kong-based publisher Eastasiasoft, and many more have been ported over and released on consoles since 2021.

Pretty Girls Panic! is a Qix-like game where the player draws a line across the screen to unveil a picture of a girl in the background. In 2021, an improved version subtitled PLUS was released. The game's name is an ode to the 1990s Gals Panic games. Pretty Girls Panic! has also been released on the Play Store for Android, published by Sticky Rice Games.

=== Pretty Girls Game Collection ===
The Pretty Girls Game Collection series are compilation releases each containing four Pretty Girls titles in one package, physically released for Nintendo Switch and PlayStation 4 and distributed by Eastasiasoft and Funbox Media. The Switch versions contain nudity that is otherwise censored on the PlayStation 4 and the digital release versions. The first collection includes: Pretty Girls Panic, Pretty Girls Mahjong Solitaire, Delicious! Pretty Girls Mahjong Solitaire and Pretty Girls Klondike Solitaire.

Pretty Girls Game Collection II, the second volume, contains Pretty Girls Panic! PLUS, Pretty Girls Mahjong Solitaire - Blue, Pretty Girls Mahjong Solitaire - Green and Poker Pretty Girls Battle: Fantasy World Edition. Pretty Girls Game Collection III contains Pretty Girls Breakers!, Pretty Girls Rivers, Pretty Girls Speed and Poker Pretty Girls Battle: Texas Hold'em. Pretty Girls Game Collection IV contains Pretty Girls 2048 Strike, Pretty Girls Breakers! PLUS, Pretty Girls Escape and Pretty Girls Tile Match.

A number of other compilations have been released on Steam, including the Best Selection Bundle and the Variety Bundle.

== List of game releases ==
Compilation releases are excluded from this table.

Title	Type	PC release	Console release		
Title	Type	PC release	NS	PS4	PS5
Mahjong Pretty Girls Battle	Mahjong	January 22, 2015	—		
Mahjong Pretty Girls Battle: School Girls Edition	Mahjong	June 23, 2015	—		
Pretty Girls Mahjong Solitaire	Mahjong solitaire	August 25, 2015	October 7, 2021^{a}	—	
Poker Pretty Girls Battle: Texas Hold'em	Poker	October 21, 2015	September 16, 2021^{c}		
Delicious! Pretty Girls Mahjong Solitaire	Mahjong solitaire	October 14, 2016	April 8, 2021		September 24, 2021^{a}
Pretty Girls Panic!	Qix clone	December 19, 2016	August 26, 2021^{a}		
Pretty Girls Mahjong Solitaire: Blue	Mahjong solitaire	October 9, 2020	December 2, 2021^{b}		
Pretty Girls Mahjong Solitaire: Green	Mahjong solitaire	October 28, 2020	December 2, 2021^{b}		
Pretty Girls Klondike Solitaire	Klondike solitaire	November 24, 2020	June 17, 2021^{a}		
Poker Pretty Girls Battle: Fantasy World Edition	Poker	January 21, 2021	May 6, 2021		July 28, 2021^{b}
Pretty Girls Panic! PLUS	Qix clone	March 10, 2021	November 4, 2021^{b}		
Pretty Girls Breakout! / Pretty Girls Breakers!	Block kuzushi	September 28, 2021	March 3, 2022^{c}		
Pretty Girls Rivers		December 3, 2021	April 3, 2022^{c}		
Pretty Girls Speed	Speed	February 24, 2022	June 2, 2022^{c}		
Pretty Girls Four Kings Solitaire		March 18, 2022	August 18, 2022		
Pretty Girls Escape		June 3, 2022	October 13, 2022^{d}		
Pretty Girls Breakout! PLUS / Pretty Girls Breakers! PLUS	Block kuzushi	June 29, 2022	—^{d}		
Pretty Girls Tile Match	Tile-matching	September 30, 2022	April 6, 2023^{d}		
Pretty Girls 2048 Strike	Sliding 2048	December 1, 2022	May 11, 2023^{d}		
Pretty Girls Klondike Solitaire: PLUS	Klondike solitaire	August 18, 2023	February 15, 2024	—	
Pretty Girls Escape PLUS		November 24, 2023	April 18, 2024		
Pretty Girls Pop Match		July 19, 2024	—		

^a Included in Game Collection (volume 1)
^b Included in Game Collection II
^c Included in Game Collection III
^d Included in Game Collection IV

== Reception ==
Famitsu in its review for Delicious! Pretty Girls Mahjong Solitaire on PlayStation 4 gave a combined score of 26/40. Digitally Downloaded gave the game on Nintendo Switch a score of 4 out of 5, writing: "while the Switch has plenty of Mahjong Solitare titles already, none of the others have the pin-up aesthetic going for them". German magazine MANiAC gave a score of 66%, giving praise to "subtly charming surroundings."
