= Gals Panic =

Video game series

- Japanese arcade flyer of the first game
- Genre: Puzzle
- Publishers: WW: Kaneko; JP: Taito; TW: Saint-Fun
- Platform: Arcade
- First release: Gals Panic; November 1990
- Latest release: Gals Panic S3; July 18, 2002

Gals Panic (ギャルズパニック, Gyaruzu Panikku) is a series of Japanese eroge (adult video games) by Kaneko for the arcades. The gameplay in the Gals Panic series is similar to Taito's classic puzzle game Qix; the objective is to control a marker on a board and uncover backgrounds, which depict women in a sexual nature who progressively strip to nudity. Many clones of Gals Panic were made after the original game achieved popularity in the 1990s.

== Gals Panic ==
In the first game, the round is over when the at least 80% of the silhouette is uncovered. The Japanese girls in the background, which are photographs or drawings, undresses in the filled-in areas, while on the playing area one large and several small enemies hinder the undressing process. There are various symbols as bonuses. In addition to useful effects such as the asteroid storm that is used for defeating enemy sprites, there are also loser symbols that can transform the girl into a frog or octopus. There is also a bonus game.

The six models that appear in the game are: Marina Matsumoto, Ayami Kida, Nami Ozawa, Yuki Miho, Emi Nakahara, and Shiori Asano.

Gals Panic was released in November 1990 published by Taito and was released by Kaneko USA in America in March 1991. The U.S. version has some censorship such as placing bras on the girl during round three instead of being topless.

Reception

Review score
Publication	Score
Famitsu	7/10, 7/10, 5/10, 3/10

Reviewers in Famitsu described the game as a hybrid of a stripping game and Qix. While one reviewer said the enemy movement was frustratingly unfair, the other reviewers commented on the girls. While Hiroshi Shibuya said the girls in question were disappointing, Miki Watanabe said said she was frustrated as none of the girls were her type.

== Gals Panic II ==
Screenshot of Gals Panic II

Gals Panic II was released in 1993 with a number of enhancements, including an eight-way joystick, stereo audio and the Card Dispenser option. The gauge is now changed to a time-based one. An alternate version was also released subtitled Quiz Mode which features an additional gameplay element of a quiz presented by each girl. A Special Version was later released with improved graphics and other changes.

Mainichi Communications released a Windows 95 and PC-98 version for Japanese home computers in December 1996, distributed via bookstores, under the name Gal Pani II.

== Gals Panic 3 ==
Gals Panic 3 was released in October 1995 and runs on the Super Kaneko Nova System hardware, on which all future arcade Gals Panic games would be built on. The drawings of the girls are more realistic than before.

== Gals Panic 4, SS, and Silhouette Stories ==
Cover art of Gals Panic SS

Gals Panic 4, also known as Gals Panic for you, was released in 1996 (Note: Re-released in 2001 as Gals Panic DX in Taiwan) on the Super Kaneko Nova System. From this title onwards, the girls that appear in Gals Panic games are in manga or anime style, although this game is tamer and there are no topless girls in it. The same year came Gals Panic SS, an expanded port of the fourth game released for the Sega Saturn home console in Japan in 1996. Famitsu scored the game 25/40. On the very same day, Kaneko released Silhouette Stories on PlayStation, which does not contain any stripping or explicit elements, but does have a story mode; Famitsu rated this game 23/40.

== Gals Panic S, S2, S3 ==
Gals Panic S2

The "S" series had key differences in gameplay and was intended for a different market than before. Gals Panic S: Special Edition (1997) (Note: Released as Gals Panic EX in Taiwan, in c. 2000) restored topless characters, adds scrolling screens and has more powerful bosses. It was followed by Gals Panic S 2 (1999), as well as a non-explicit version called Panic Street (1999). As Kaneko was struggling financially and exited the market, the follow-up and final official game, Gals Panic S 3 (2002), was published by Able Corporation.

== Clones and similar games ==
Games by other companies that itself cloned or at least imitated Gals Panic include Namco's Dancing Eyes, Lady Killer by Mitchell Corporation, numerous titles from South Korean Comad such as Gals Pinball and Miss World, Gal Pani X by To Heart, and in more recent times, Pretty Girls Panic!.
