= Sunset (video game) =

2015 video game

- Developer: Tale of Tales
- Publisher: Tale of Tales
- Engine: Unity
- Platforms: Microsoft Windows, OS X, Linux
- Release: WW: 21 May 2015
- Genre: Adventure
- Mode: Single-player

Sunset is an adventure video game developed by Belgian studio Tale of Tales, released on 21 May 2015 for Windows, MacOS, and Linux. Set in the fictional South American country of Anchuria, players take on the role of Angela Burnes, an African-American housekeeper working for the enigmatic Gabriel Ortega. As she completes her daily tasks in his luxurious apartment, she slowly uncovers pieces of his life and his involvement in the country’s escalating revolution. With each choice Angela shapes her own role in the conflict, blurring the lines between duty and defiance in a world on the brink of change. Sunset is the last commercial game developed by Tale of Tales before their return to focusing exclusively on video game art exhibitions and other artistic projects.

== Gameplay ==
Sunset is played from a first person perspective. Angela Burnes, an American citizen who is visiting the fictional country of Anchuria, has to perform numerous housekeeping tasks an hour before sunset. As she performs her tasks, the player finds out more about the Civil War and the dictator that currently leads Anchuria. As time goes by, changes occur both within the house and in the city which Angela can see through the windows.

== Development ==
Sunset was announced by Tale of Tales in a March 2014 press release. The press release detailed the developers' collaborators, Austin Wintory would be providing the soundtrack, and Leigh Alexander and Ste Curran would act as consultants.

The ideas behind Sunset had been developing at Tale of Tales for many years prior to its announcement. Tale of Tales describe The Apartment, a 2005 game prototype released as part of the developers 10 year anniversary bundle as "an early related sketch". Sunset was originally envisaged as a romance between the player character and the apartment's inhabitant. During the game's development, Tales refocused the game to explore how everyday life continues against the backdrop of war. Though war may not be as immediate to the player as it is in Sunset, Tale of Tales state that "we are all living our lives while in the background a war is going on", "Sunset is about all of our lives, the lives we all lead: in our peaceful apartments while the world is burning outside."

The game was part funded by the Flanders Audiovisual Fund, and further funding came from a Kickstarter crowdfunding campaign which began in June 2014, it achieved its $25,000 goal and raised $67,636 in July 2014 The increased Kickstarter funding allowed Tale of Tales to expand on the player character, Angela Burnes' presence within the game through additional art, animation and narrative.

Burnes was inspired by Angela Davis, Pam Grier, and Nina Simone. Tale of Tale's Auriea Harvey's experience as an American expatriate informed Burnes' character. The choice of the 1970s setting drew from Tale of Tales' belief that the period represented a shift, a time worth exploring when "Western culture morphed from an authoritarian civilization based on rules of decency and formal traditions to an egalitarian society that celebrates individual freedom above all". Tale of Tales spoke of recapturing a spirit of innocence, where belief in social change through popular revolution was still alive.

The apartment in which the game is set is based upon a design for the "ideal bachelor pad" from a 1970 issue of Playboy; its contents were inspired the contents of Yves Saint Laurent's Paris apartment. The game's central story, told through the interaction of a cleaner and the apartment inhabitant was partly inspired by the film Chungking Express.

Sunset was released worldwide on May 21, 2015, for Microsoft Windows, OS X, and Linux.

== Reception ==
The game received a score of 65/100 on reviews aggregation website Metacritic based on 33 reviews, indicating a mixed response. Michael Thomsen of The Washington Post wrote, "Sunset creates a beautiful and sometimes-unnervingly artificial platform for the alienating role-play bound up in employer-employee relationships, staged against a backdrop of historical revolution that threatens to spoil it." Edge awarded the game a score of 9/10, describing it as "an enormously affecting examination of the impact of war. Not on soldiers or politicians, but on everyone else - those who can only watch from the sidelines." Joe Donnelly of Digital Spy rated it 4/5 stars and wrote, "It's a unique take on the war-based theme, and will evoke your inner voyeur, dazzling in its moments of exposition as well as its suggestive junctures." IGN awarded it a score of 8.0 out of 10, saying, "Taken slowly, Sunset is a beautiful, fascinating experience." Taylor Wilde of PC Gamer rated it 68/100 and wrote, "Sunset's themes, setting, and plot are plenty interesting, but the player's interaction with them feels incongruous." Writing for Game Informer, Kimberley Wallace rated it 5.75/10 and said, "The story is fascinating, but the gameplay quickly becomes humdrum and the technical problems are extremely frustrating".

Sunset was a commercial failure, selling only 4,000 copies in its first month of release, half of which were reserved for Kickstarter backers. Subsequently, Tale of Tales announced that they would no longer pursue commercial video game projects. Following their announcement, developer Adrian Chmielarz dissected the game and explored the reasons for its failure. He concluded that it was a "unengaging, technically challenged game of questionable design", and though he regretted the studio's outcome, described Tale of Tales as influential pioneers that inspired many.

=== Awards ===
List of awards and nominations
Award	Category	Result	Ref.
The Game Awards 2015	Games for Change	Nominated	
