= Lillymo Games =

Video game developer

Lillymo Games Inc.
- Type: Private
- Industry: Video games
- Founded: 20 December 2017; 8 years ago
- Founder: Barry Johnson
- Headquarters: Guelph, Ontario, Canada
- Website: lillymogames.com

Lillymo Games Inc. is an independent video game developer founded in Guelph, Ontario, Canada by Barry Johnson. Lillymo Games is best known for creating the shoot 'em up series Habroxia and brick breaker game Twin Breaker: A Sacred Symbols Adventure.

== Video games ==
Lillymo Games was founded in December 2017 by Barry Johnson, developing his first video game Perils of Baking for the PlayStation 4 and PlayStation Vita, which released in June 2018.

On 24 September 2019, Lillymo Games' released Habroxia on the PlayStation Vita and PlayStation 4, and in March 2020, Lillymo Games released Twin Breaker: A Sacred Symbol Adventure. The game featured characters based on the likeness of podcast and YouTube personalities Colin Moriarty and Chris "Ray Gun" Maldonado, selling 10,000 copies in three months. Moriarty was credited as the game's writer and in June officially joined Lillymo Games as its Chief Creative Officer after acquiring a 49% minority stake in the company.

Habroxia 2 was released on PlayStation 4, Xbox consoles, Steam, PS Vita and Nintendo Switch in February 2021 to mostly positive reviews.

Super Perils of Baking, a remake of the studio's first game, was released on PlayStation 4, PlayStation 5, Xbox One, Steam, and Nintendo Switch on June 3, 2022, receiving generally favorable reviews.

A sequel to Twin Breaker: A Sacred Symbol Adventure released on December 12, 2024, titled Tri Breaker: A Sacred Symbols Odyssey, available on PlayStation 4, PlayStation 5, Xbox consoles, Steam and Nintendo Switch.

== Support for PlayStation Vita ==
Lillymo Games was one of the final developers to support the PlayStation Vita, primarily developing games for the handheld platform before porting them to consoles. On March 29, 2021, IGN and other game industry outlets reported that Sony was closing the PlayStation Store on the Vita, with Johnson revealing that game developers had not been given any notice, forcing them to cancel planned upcoming releases for the Vita. Lillymo Games also revealed Sony had been selling Vita dev kits just one month prior, without any further information about its intentions to close the storefront.

== Games developed ==
Year	Title	Platform(s)
2018	Perils of Baking	PlayStation Vita, PlayStation 4, Nintendo Switch
2019	Habroxia	PlayStation Vita, PlayStation 4, Xbox One, Xbox Series X\S, Nintendo Switch, PlayStation 5, Steam
2020	Twin Breaker: A Sacred Symbols Adventure	PlayStation Vita, PlayStation 4, Xbox One, Xbox Series X\S, Nintendo Switch, Steam
2021	Habroxia 2	PlayStation Vita, PlayStation 4, PlayStation 5, Xbox One, Xbox Series X\S, Nintendo Switch, Steam
2022	Super Perils of Baking	PlayStation 4, PlayStation 5, Xbox One, Xbox Series X\S, Nintendo Switch, Steam
2024	Tri Breaker: A Sacred Symbols Odyssey	PlayStation 4, PlayStation 5, Xbox One, Xbox Series X\S, Nintendo Switch, Steam
2026	Saint Slayer: Spear of Sacrilege	PlayStation 4, PlayStation 5, Xbox One, Xbox Series X\S, Nintendo Switch, Steam
