= HyperParasite =

2019 video game

- Developer: Troglobytes Games
- Publishers: Troglobytes Games; Hound Picked Games
- Programmers: Matteo Alessandrini; Nicola Loglisci; Luciano Iurino
- Composers: Joe Kataldo; Van Reeves
- Platforms: Microsoft Windows; Nintendo Switch; PlayStation 4; Xbox One
- Release: 3 April 2020
- Genres: Multidirectional shooter, bullet hell
- Modes: Single-player, multiplayer

HyperParasite is a roguelike shooter video game developed and published by Troglobytes Games. Early prototypes of the game were distributed through Steam's early access program in 2019. The game was released on 3 April 2020 for Nintendo Switch, PlayStation 4 and Xbox One, which was followed by a physical release for the Switch on 19 February 2021. The game received generally positive reviews, earning praise for its uniqueness and design and criticism for its difficulty.

== Gameplay ==
HyperParasite is a top down roguelike twin-stick shooter with perma-death mechanics. The game can be played in single player or in local co-op. Players play as an alien parasite who needs to possess humans to survive. Without a human host the alien parasite is weak and easily defeated. The game has over 60 different humans to possess and collect. All of them have unique attacks and traits that help the player. The unlocked characters are kept even after death. Furthermore, levels are procedurally generated making the objectives and the amount of enemies, upgrades and items different every run. Creating near limitless replayability.

== Plot ==
After World War III, the planet Earth is threatened by a parasitic alien organism capable of controlling humans as living hosts and using them to destroy Earth. To combat the alien parasite martial law is declared starting a global hunt to destroy the parasite.

== Development ==
HyperParasite is developed by Troglobytes and co-published by Hound Picked Games. The game was first released on the steam platform as an early access game in 2019. After a successful early access launch it was announced that the following year the game was to be released for Nintendo Switch, PlayStation 4 and Xbox One on 3 April 2020.

=== Voice actors ===
Most voice acting was done by actors Vincent van Ommen and Joey Sourlis. With Van Ommen voicing the title of the game, the stage names and various characters. And Joey Sourlis voicing President Ray Gunn.

=== Soundtrack ===
The original soundtrack for HyperParasite was created by Van Reeves and Joe Kataldo. The synthwave music was made to fit the 1980s look and feel of the game. On 3 April 2020 the soundtrack was released on Valve's digital distribution platform, Steam, as additional downloadable content for the main game. The soundtrack contains 13 tracks, available in MP3 320 kbit/s format.

== Reception ==
Reception

Aggregate scores
Aggregator	Score
Metacritic	NS: 71/100; PS4: 79/100; XONE: 74/100; PC: 74/100
OpenCritic	44% recommend

Review scores
Publication	Score
Famitsu	30/40
NintendoLife	7.0/10
SwitchPlayer	5/5
Screen Rant	3/5
PSXExtreme	7.8/10

HyperParasite has received "mixed or average" reviews, according to review aggregator Metacritic. Fellow review aggregator OpenCritic assessed that the game received fair approval, being recommended by 44% of critics. Critics praised the gameplay, uniqueness and presentation, but criticized the steep difficulty level for casual gamers. Many critics praised the game for its addictive gameplay.

B. McCarthy of PSX Extreme rated HyperParasite a 7.8/10, concluding: "HyperParasite is a frenetic, fast-paced roguelike that is not for the faint of a casual's heart. Its uncompromising action keeps you on a razor's edge, and the sixty characters ensure every playthrough is not the same. But most importantly, it is a pitch-perfect love letter to the 1980s."

Screen Rant gave HyperParasite 3 out of 5 stars writing "Everything about HyperParasite feels fresh and vibrant." and that the game "sports an incredible soundtrack and retro graphics that remain upbeat and energetic throughout each of the game's levels." Noting that the difficulty level and perma-death mechanics could be too harsh for casual gamers.

Dominic Tarason of Rock Paper Shotgun gave an overall positive review. However, he refrained from giving an actual score based on the game's early access status at the time.

Matt Gardner of Forbes named HyperParasite his indie game of the year for 2020, adding "I'd go so far as to name it my favorite game of the year outright."

In the May 2020 edition of PlayStation Official Magazine UK Aaron Potter concluded: "Body-swapping for new powers never gets dull. HyperParasite is creative roguelike with major progression issues, but heaps of derisive charm and tight twin-stick shooting".
