= The Graveyard (video game) =

- Developer: Tale of Tales
- Publisher: Tale of Tales
- Engine: Unity
- Platforms: Microsoft Windows, Mac OS X, iOS, Android

The Graveyard is a computer art game developed by Belgian developer Tale of Tales in which the player assumes the role of an elderly woman walking through a graveyard to a bench.

== Gameplay ==
The player controls an elderly woman walking along a cemetery path to a bench, where sitting triggers a song about death. The player can make her stand up and leave through the cemetery gate, ending the game. Exclusively in the paid version she might die while seated.

== Development and release ==
The Graveyard was developed by Tale of Tales, specifically designed by Auriea Harvey and Michaël Samyn.

By September 24, 2005, the original intent was to feature an old lady looking for her husband's grave and having a certain reaction upon finding it. Both the grave's location and the character's reaction would differ between playthroughs. However, by May 29, 2007, the developers perceived the task as detracting from the desired emotional impact of the scene, and removed it.

The team submitted a request for funding to the Flanders Audiovisual Fund on June 4, 2007. The proposal was accepted on September 11, 2007, with a grant of €15,000 toward the total production budget of €18,000.

Tale of Tales released the game on March 21, 2008.

== Awards ==
The Graveyard was nominated for the Innovation Award at the 2009 Independent Games Festival.

== Legacy ==
The game was one of the inspirations for the Tibetan village scene in Uncharted 2: Among Thieves.
