= Sense: A Cyberpunk Ghost Story =

2020 video game

- Developer: Suzaku
- Publisher: Top Hat Studios
- Director: Benjamin Widdowson
- Engine: Unity
- Platforms: Microsoft Windows; macOS; Nintendo Switch; PlayStation 4; PlayStation Vita; Xbox One
- Release: Windows, macOS; August 25, 2020; Nintendo Switch; January 7, 2021; PlayStation 4; February 11, 2021; PlayStation Vita; April 27, 2021; Xbox One; January 12, 2022
- Genres: Point-and-click adventure, survival horror
- Mode: Single-player

Sense: A Cyberpunk Ghost Story is a 2020 survival horror video game developed by American indie developer Suzaku, released for various home computers and consoles. The game features a blend of Chinese folklore and Cyberpunk themes, while drawing gameplay inspiration from the Fatal Frame and Clock Tower franchises. It was followed by a sequel, SENSEs: Midnight (2023).

== Gameplay ==
The world can be explored via pointing and clicking to reveal elements and solve puzzles. The main character has cybernetic ocular implants, which allow for zooming in on important areas for a closer look.

== Plot ==
Set in August 2084, Neo Hong Kong, heroine Mei-Lin Mak must explore the ruins of Chong Sing Apartments, discovering the history of its 14 lost souls, as well as her own family's past.

== Release ==
The game was released for Windows via Steam August 25, 2020, but temporarily pulled the next day for bug fixes and difficulty tweaks. It was also released for macOS, in 2021 for Nintendo Switch, PlayStation 4 and PlayStation Vita, and in 2022 for Xbox One.

=== Controversy ===
Following the game's release on Switch, Top Hat Studios released a statement indicating they would not censor the game, despite receiving calls on social media to censor the game and death threats relating to the game's art style. Though TheGamer questioned whether the statement was instead a manufactured controversy, noting the game received an influx of reviews following the statement, most of which they said were from people who barely played the game, and which contained statements in opposition to "social justice warriors." The Gamer also argued that the art-style present in the game is outdated and that therefore criticism of it is justified. Top Hat Studios responded to the article by TheGamer, ResetEra, and other venues, addressing the accusations of manufactured controversy by providing screenshots of these threats in a Twitter post.

== Reception ==
Reception

Aggregate score
Aggregator	Score
Metacritic	NS: 55/100

On Metacritic the Nintendo Switch version game holds a 55 rating based on 7 reviews indicating "mixed or average reviews". Finger Guns said in a review of the Switch version that "For a game about spirits, Sense: A Cyberpunk Ghost Story is pretty soulless. A by-the-numbers backtracking horror game in the vein of Clock Tower its structure and content feel lackluster and a little disappointing if you went in expecting cyberpunk themes."
