= Tale of Tales (company) =

Belgian art video game developer

- Industry: Video games
- Founded: Late 2003
- Founder: Auriea Harvey; Michaël Samyn
- Headquarters: Belgium
- Products: The Path; Sunset
- Website: tale-of-tales.com

Tale of Tales is a Belgian developer of art games founded in 2003 by Auriea Harvey and Michaël Samyn, who had been working together in the creation of Web sites and electronic art as Entropy8Zuper! since 1999. In an interview by Nightmare Mode, Michael Samyn explained their motivations to create interactive art and disappointment at the lack of evolution in interaction of games.

They live close to the Saint Bavo Cathedral, which they consider one of their greatest influences. The studio is named after Giambattista Basile's book The Tale of Tales (Lo Cunto de li cunti), with their main series being retellings of fairy tales in the form of adventure games, each subtitled "a Tale of Tales" and linked together by a common character referred to as the Deaf-Mute Girl in a Pretty White Dress in the 8 Web site and as the Girl in White in The Path's user manual. The third game in this series, Fatale, is based on the tale of Salome.

February 2010 saw the release of Vanitas, described as "a memento mori for your digital hands", their first work for the iPhone OS platform and their first with music by Zoë Keating. On 1 March 2010 it was announced that they were commencing the development of two large projects, alternating between the two of them for the next 18 months (i.e. until September 2011).

Despite a successful Kickstarter campaign, the commercial failure of their game Sunset caused Tale of Tales to announce that they would no longer pursue commercial video game projects.

In 2024, Tale of Tales evolved into Song of Songs, with the couple currently in Rome, Italy, as per the Tale of Tales homepage. Since the same year, their remake of Endless Forest, subtitled Second Decade, became available in its fourth beta version to backers and members of the Tale of Tales community. Unlike the original 2005 title which used Quest3D as their game engine, the newest iteration features the more advanced Unreal Engine 4.

== Projects ==
=== Commercial games ===
- 8 (2002–2009, on hiatus), based on "Sun, Moon, and Talia" and other variants of the "Sleeping Beauty" myth
- The Path (2009), based on "Little Red Riding Hood", originally titled 144
- Sunset (2015)
  - "A Day in San Bavón" (2014)

=== Other games ===
- Het Min en Meer Spel (The Less and More Game, 2005), for an album by Gerry De Mol and Eva De Roovere
- The Endless Forest (2005—, ongoing)
- The Kiss: Incorporator (2007), commissioned by the Museum of Modern Art, Antwerp
- The Graveyard (2008)
- Fatale (2009)
- Vanitas (2010), commissioned for the Art History of Games symposium and exhibition by the Savannah College of Art and Design and the Georgia Institute of Technology Program in Digital Media
- Bientôt l'été ("Almost Summer", 2012), based on the work of Marguerite Duras and other French literature
- Luxuria Superbia (2013) Game for the Android tablets, iPad, Linux, OS X, Ouya and Windows. It won the Nuovo Award at the 2014 Independent Games Festival.
- LOCK (2016), part of the Triennale Game Collection

=== Screensavers ===
- Poussière sidérale (2003), screensaver based on particle systems designed for 8
- Vernanimalcula, screensaver for the National Bank of Belgium

=== As Entropy8Zuper! (selected) ===
- Eden.Garden (2001), commissioned by the San Francisco Museum of Modern Art
- Wirefire (1999–2003)
- Al-Jahiz (2000), commissioned by Lifetime Television
- B-O-X (2002)
- Sixteenpages.net (2000)
- skinonskinonskin (1999), first exhibited at Hell.com
- The Godlove Museum (1999–2006)
