= The Path (video game) =

2009 psychological horror video game

- Developer: Tale of Tales
- Publishers: Tale of Tales; TransGaming (Mac OS X); TopWare; 1C Company; Zoo Corporation
- Artists: Auriea Harvey; Michaël Samyn; Laura Raines Smith
- Composers: Jarboe; Kris Force (Amber Asylum)
- Platforms: Microsoft Windows; Mac OS X
- Release: March 18, 2009; May 7, 2009 (Mac OS X); Autumn 2009 (Polish); December 11, 2009 (Russian); July 7, 2010 (Japanese)
- Genres: Psychological horror, art
- Mode: Single-player

The Path is a psychological horror art game developed by Tale of Tales originally released for the Microsoft Windows operating system on March 18, 2009, in English and Dutch, and later ported to Mac OS X by TransGaming Technologies.

It is inspired by several versions of the fairy tale Little Red Riding Hood, and by folklore tropes and conventions in general, but set in contemporary times. The player can choose to control one of six different sisters, who are sent one-by-one on errands by their mother to see their sick grandmother. The player can choose whether to stay on the path or to wander, where wolves are lying in wait.

== Gameplay ==
A screenshot of the character Rose on the titular path, surrounded by the forest. The Girl in White can be seen in the distance.

According to the developer, the game is not meant to be played in the traditional sense, in that there is no winning strategy. In fact, much of the gameplay requires the player to choose the losing path for the sisters to run into encounters which they (and the player) are meant to experience. Even the story narratives are not typical for a game, as explained by the developer, "We are not story-tellers in the traditional sense of the word. In the sense that we know a story and we want to share it with you. Our work is more about exploring the narrative potential of a situation. We create only the situation. And the actual story emerges from playing, partially in the game, partially in the player's mind."

The game begins in a room with six girls. The player can choose any sister to play her route, and they can play the sisters' routes in any order. Upon selecting a girl, the game instructs the player as such: "Go to Grandmother's house and stay on the path." Going directly to Grandmother's house will result in the player returning to the character select room with nothing having changed. If the player instead goes off the path and encounters the girl's wolf, a personalized antagonist representing her inner struggles, they can complete the girl's route and her character will be removed from the character select screen.

Before encountering a girl's wolf, players can explore the woods surrounding the path and find points of interest that specific girls can interact with. Sometimes doing so will add items to the player's inventory, which is styled after a picnic basket, referencing the one Red Riding Hood carries. The points of interest and items are meant to impart information on the sisters and how they contrast with each other.

For a girl to pick up or examine an object, the player needs to either click on the interaction button or move her close enough for a superimposed image of the object to appear on the screen, then let go of the controls. The character will interact and an image will appear on the screen, indicating what has been unlocked.

The game is mostly played from a third-person perspective, but some sections are played in first person.

== Plot ==
The Path is based on Little Red Riding Hood, repeatedly telling the story of a girl journeying through the forest alone to visit her Grandmother's home.

The game begins in a room with six sisters aged nine to 19. The player is given no information about them other than a name. When the player selects a girl, the journey begins and the game tells them, "Go to Grandmother's house and stay on the path." However, going directly to Grandmother's house will return the player to the character select room. To progress, the player must abandon the path and explore the surrounding forest. An interpretation of this may be that the game is about growing up and that doing so can require breaking rules and facing the consequences of one's actions.

As the player explores the forest, they can find various items scattered around. Every item a girl encounters in the forest will change the appearance and items inside of Grandmother's house. When examining an object, the girl currently being played may express a thought. If an item is picked up, players hear other girls' thoughts about it by accessing it the item from their inventory, which is depicted as a basket.

If the player idles in the forest, a dancing girl in a white dress, referred to as the Girl in White, will appear. She'll dance with the girl the player is controlling, before offering her hand. If the player accepts, the Girl in White will guide the girl back to the path, and once it is reached, the two will embrace.

The Wolf is the antagonist in the game and takes on a different form for each girl. The forms serve as metaphors for each girl's internal struggles and represent tribulations that are associated with the stages of childhood and adolescence. When the girl encounters the Wolf, there is a brief cut scene of the girl and the Wolf. The screen then goes black for a moment before showing the girl, dishevelled and on the ground, waking up in front of Grandmother's house. When she gets up, she has a noticeable limp and walks much slower.

If the player enters Grandmother's house without interacting with the Wolf, they arrive safely, cozy up next to Grandmother, and are sent back to the starting room. The girl the player guided will still be there, and she can be played again. If the player did engage with the Wolf, then everything in the house is darker, and if the player remains still for too long, darkness clouds the screen and growls are heard. Depending on the girl, doors are scratched, furniture tipped over and broken, or strange black threads are draped across everything. Music crescendos as the player enters a final surreal room before falling down and the screen blacks out. Images then flash on the screen, featuring the girl being attacked by her Wolf, before the player returns to the starting room. The girl played is no longer there and will remain absent.

When all of the girls have encountered their wolves, the Girl in White becomes playable. During her time in the forest, it is raining, and she has no Wolf. When she visits Grandmother's house, the Girl in White will travel through the house, now a combination of all of the end rooms of the previous girls ending with the no-wolf room. Upon reaching the Grandmother, the Girl in White appears in the apartment, with her dress stained with blood. The sisters all return through the door, the Girl in White leaves, and the game starts over.

Much of the game is depicted without clear explanations; instead, it focuses on eliciting emotions and leaves much up to interpretation.

== Characters ==
- Robin is the youngest sister and the more traditional Red Riding Hood. She's 9 years old.
- Rose is 11 years old.
- Ginger is 13 years old.
- Ruby is 15 years old.
- Carmen is 17 years old.
- Scarlet is 19 years old.
- The Girl in White is a mysterious girl who can be seen by the player if they wander off into the woods.

== Development ==
The Path was announced on the Tale of Tales Game Design forum on March 16, 2006, under the working title 144, on the pattern of their first-started, on-hiatus Tale of Tales 8 (chosen for the universal, language-independent nature of Arabic numerals). This number originally referred to the six 24-hour periods of the six days in which the game was set, but in the released version refers to the 144 coin flowers.

== Release ==
The Path was released on March 19, 2009. It became available for Mac on May 7, 2009.

== Reception ==
Reception

Aggregate score
Aggregator	Score
Metacritic	79/100

Review scores
Publication	Score
GameSpot	8/10
IGN	7.7/10
VideoGamer.com	10/10

Iain McCafferty of VideoGamer.com called The Path "a hugely significant work in terms of what a video game can be beyond the realms of throwaway entertainment" and "potentially a seminal moment in video games." He claimed that "It will be years before a game made by the big budget software houses like Ubisoft or EA is brave enough to attempt anything remotely similar, but The Path shows promising signs that gaming is starting to grow up."

Heather Chaplin of Filmmaker Magazine pointed out how uniquely feminine The Path is: "For me, The Path is about what a remarkably fine line it is that separates childhood from adulthood, innocence from cynicism, and how utterly not black-and-white most things in life are."

Tim Martin of The Daily Telegraph cited The Path as a recent example of a "vigorous experimentation with techniques of narrative." He likened it to "an Angela Carter novel, as siphoned through The Sims."

Justin McElroy of Engadget commented on gameplay mechanics: "You get one instruction in the game and you have to disregard it. That's the kind of experience we're talking about here. Once you leave the path you'll find innumerable creepy yet beautifully rendered experiences to take part in, but you're never really given any guidance as what the point or object of all of it is. Basically, it's gameplay in the abstract." Mike Gust of Tap Repeatedly called The Path "a sort of anti-game", "a game turned inside out in service to something deeply personal, human and disturbing".

John Walker of RockPaperShotGun remarked "I kind of don't like the game" but noted that this "is not a criticism. If anything, it's the highest compliment I could pay it. While there's spooky woods, abandoned playgrounds, creepy dolls, and many other familiar themes of horror, these offer no scares. For me, the horror comes from what appears to be the most abhorrently pessimistic presentation of adolescence."

Steven Poole of Edge opined that the game is "a supremely boring collection of FMVs with pretensions to interactivity that very quickly wears out its joke about control and becomes a tedious slab of nihilistic whimsy," yet noting that the game features a "lugubrious, Lynchian surrealism" and that "in its ornery and precious way, The Path is a triumph of atmosphere, coming much closer than the cruder shocks of games such as Silent Hill or BioShock to a dramatization of what Ernst Jentsch and Freud analyzed as the "uncanny" in literature."

=== Awards ===
An in-progress, alpha-stage version of The Path was nominated for Excellence in Visual Arts after being exhibited at the Independent Games Festival in 2008. The game also has been honored with two awards at Bilbao, Spain's hóPLAY International Video Game Festival. The game won Best Sound and Best Design.
