= Reverie (video game) =

2018 video game

- Developer: Rainbite
- Platforms: PlayStation 4, PlayStation Vita, Nintendo Switch
- Release: PS4, PS Vita: WW: 5 April 2018; Nintendo Switch: WW: 7 February 2019
- Genre: Action-adventure
- Mode: Single-player

Reverie is an action-adventure video game developed by New Zealand-based indie studio Rainbite, first released on 5 April 2018.

== Gameplay ==
Reverie features open world exploration, real-time combat, dungeons and boss fights inspired by New Zealand's history, culture and environment, showing influences from classic SNES games including EarthBound and The Legend of Zelda: A Link to the Past.

== Development ==
In February 2019, Reverie: Sweet As Edition released on Nintendo Switch with added features. Reverie is Rainbite's first video game and released on the PlayStation 4, PlayStation Vita, and later the Nintendo Switch. Social media promotion kept the marketing budget to "zero dollars", instead engaging with Twitch streamers and passionate users of the PlayStation Vita library to build a fanbase.

Reception

Aggregate score
Aggregator	Score
Metacritic	PS Vita: 73/100; Switch: 71/100

== Critical response ==
The game received "mixed or average reviews", according to review aggregator Metacritic.
