= Legacy of Kain: Soul Reaver 1 & 2 Remastered =

- Developer: Aspyr (Note: Original games developed by Crystal Dynamics. Additional development by Saber Interactive.)
- Publisher: Aspyr
- Director: Monika Erősová
- Series: Legacy of Kain
- Platforms: Nintendo Switch; PlayStation 4; PlayStation 5; Windows; Xbox One; Xbox Series X/S
- Release: December 10, 2024
- Genre: Action-adventure
- Mode: Single-player

Legacy of Kain: Soul Reaver 1 & 2 Remastered is a 2024 action-adventure video game compilation developed and published by Aspyr. It contains remastered versions of Legacy of Kain: Soul Reaver (1999) and Soul Reaver 2 (2001), entries in the Legacy of Kain series originally developed by Crystal Dynamics. It was released on December 10, 2024, to coincide with the 25th anniversary of Soul Reaver, and received generally positive reviews from critics. It was followed up in 2026 by Legacy of Kain: Defiance Remastered.

== Gameplay ==
Soul Reaver 1 & 2 Remastered comprises the second and third games in the Legacy of Kain series, both of which follow the story of Raziel, a vampire who is executed and resurrected as a wraith to take revenge on his master, Kain. The remastered collection includes new features such as toggleable high-fidelity graphics, a modern control scheme, improved camera controls, a map and compass, an overview of cut levels, a photo mode, and a day and night cycle which was cut from the original Soul Reaver.

== Development ==
References to the collection first appeared at San Diego Comic-Con in July 2024, with a diorama consisting of statues of Raziel and Kain, respectively, made by Dark Horse Direct. The compilation was officially confirmed at PlayStation's State of Play presentation that was held in September.

The announcement and release of Soul Reaver 1 & 2 Remastered coincides with the 25th anniversary of 1999's Legacy of Kain: Soul Reaver. The game follows a development philosophy similar to that of Aspyr's Tomb Raider I-III Remastered, and builds upon the games' original source code and engine, provided to the team by Crystal Dynamics.

The aforementioned statues were available for pre-order in October.

The director of the compilation is Monika Erősová, better known in the online community of the series as Raina Audron, and was an active member of the fandom since 2003.

== Reception ==
Reception

Aggregate scores
Aggregator	Score
Metacritic	(NS) 65/100 (PC) 76/100 (PS5) 77/100 (XSXS) 76/100
OpenCritic	67%

Review scores
Publication	Score
Destructoid	9/10
GameSpot	8/10
Hardcore Gamer	3.5/5
Nintendo Life	8/10
Push Square	7/10

Legacy of Kain: Soul Reaver 1 & 2 Remastered received "generally favorable" reviews from critics, according to the review aggregator website Metacritic. OpenCritic determined that 67% of critics recommended the game.
