= Legacy of Kain: Defiance Remastered =

2026 video game

- Developer: PlayEveryWare (Note: Original game developed by Crystal Dynamics)
- Publisher: Crystal Dynamics
- Series: Legacy of Kain
- Platforms: PlayStation 4; PlayStation 5; Windows; Xbox One; Xbox Series X/S; Nintendo Switch; Nintendo Switch 2
- Release: PS4, PS5, Windows, Xbox One, Xbox Series X/S; March 3, 2026; Nintendo Switch, Switch 2; March 31, 2026
- Genre: Action-adventure
- Mode: Single-player

Legacy of Kain: Defiance Remastered is a 2026 action-adventure video game developed by PlayEveryWare and published by Crystal Dynamics. It is a remastered and expanded version of Legacy of Kain: Defiance (2003), the fifth entry in the Legacy of Kain series. It was released on March 3, 2026, during the franchise's 30th anniversary year.

== Gameplay ==
The original game was the first in the series to feature both Kain and Raziel, the respective protagonists of the sub-series Blood Omen and Soul Reaver, as playable characters. It follows both characters as they explore the land of Nosgoth and travel through time in an effort to change their destinies. The story-driven action-adventure emphasizes combat with supernatural abilities, exploration and puzzle-solving, switching between the two characters' perspectives as the player progresses through the narrative.

Like its predecessor, Legacy of Kain: Defiance Remastered features various improvements and quality of life additions over the original game, such as toggleable high-fidelity visuals, a new third-person camera system that can be switched to the original's fixed camera, along with rebuilt level geometry to accommodate the increased camera freedom, in-level and world maps, a new Foresight ability that highlights the path forward, a photo mode, and unlockable alternate character skins inspired by the franchise's history for both Kain and Raziel.

The game also features a selection of "lost levels" - restorations of unfinished areas and prototypes that were cut from the original 2003 release. These are presented separately from the main campaign, each accompanied by developer notes explaining their original context and intended placement. The Deluxe Edition additionally includes a playable demo of the canceled sequel Legacy of Kain: Dark Prophecy, which offers a brief glimpse into one of the areas planned for that game's opening.

== Development ==
Legacy of Kain: Defiance Remastered was developed by PlayEveryWare under Crystal Dynamics' oversight, with the team focusing on a faithful modernization while preserving the original story, voice performances, and core gameplay mechanics. The project drew heavily from a large archive of original development materials found at Crystal Dynamics, which included unfinished assets, cut content, and milestone builds. Longtime fans within the development team, such as art director Monika Erősová, better known in the community as Raina Audron, helped inform decisions on which lost levels to restore and how to present the additional archival material.

The game was announced in February 2026 during a PlayStation State of Play event, with trailers highlighting the visual upgrades, new camera, and bonus content such as the Dark Prophecy demo. It launched digitally on March 3, 2026, on PlayStation 4, PlayStation 5, Windows, Xbox One and Xbox Series X/S. The Nintendo Switch and Nintendo Switch 2 versions, originally planned for release on the same date, got delayed to later the in same month, March 31, 2026.

On April 22, 2026, Patch 1.0.7 was released, adding new Lost Levels featuring previously cut content from earlier games in the series, new unlockable skins for player characters, weapons and NPCs, along with new battle arenas, expanded galleries, and various improvements and fixes.

== Reception ==
Reception

Aggregate scores
| Aggregator | Score |
|---|---|
| Metacritic | (PC) 73/100 (PS5) 70/100 (XSXS) 77/100 |
| OpenCritic | 54% recommend |

Review scores
| Publication | Score |
|---|---|
| Destructoid | (PC) 8.5/10 |
| GamingTrend | (PC) 85/100 |
| GameSpot | (PC) 7/10 |
| PlayStation Universe | (PS5) 6.5/10 |

According to the review aggregator Metacritic, the PlayStation 5 and PC versions of Legacy of Kain: Defiance Remastered received "mixed or average" reviews, while the Xbox Series X version received "generally favorable" reviews. Individual scores ranged from the high 80s down to the low 50s. Fellow review aggregator OpenCritic assessed that the game received fair approval, being recommended by 54% of critics.

Reviewers widely praised the remaster for preserving the original game's strong narrative, intricate lore, and acclaimed voice acting. Richard Wakeling of GameSpot described the writing as "dramatic, evocative, and excellent," with remastered audio making the "phenomenal voice acting and music" even more impactful.

Critics highlighted several improvements in the remaster. The new optional third-person free camera was frequently noted as a major enhancement; Ron Burke of GamingTrend called the rebuilt camera system "game-changing" and said that "It's hard to overstate just how much of a huge improvement this really is", while Tiago Manuel of Destructoid stated that it is "the one the game deserved all along" and greatly improves platforming that was previously "absolutely torturous". Reviewers also praised the updated visuals, including enhanced textures, lighting, and character models, with GameSpot remarking that "it looks like how I remember the original in my mind's eye, with a graphical upgrade that's still true to the art direction and feel of the original", while Destructoid highlighted "greatly enhanced textures, lighting, and beautifully re-modelled characters". Additional quality-of-life features, such as refined controls, improved navigation options, and other adjustments, were noted by reviewers as helping to address longstanding frustrations from the PlayStation 2 era, particularly with platforming and navigation.

Several reviewers observed that core elements of the original 2003 gameplay continue to show their age despite the remaster's improvements. Combat was frequently criticized as repetitive and shallow; Ron Burke of GamingTrend described it as "shallow and repetitive", citing linear level design and "monster closets", with the caveat that it is a "moot" observation and that "this game is very much a product of its time", remarking that "this game is aggressively early 2000s-era gameplay through and through". PlayStation Universe stated that while the new camera is a strong addition, "Everything else, unfortunately, is hit-and-miss", with visual upgrades varying in quality and some lingering issues with sound design and combat left largely unaddressed.
