= Paul Lukather =

American actor

- Born: Paul David Lukather; August 24, 1926; New York City, U.S.
- Died: October 9, 2014 (aged 88); California, U.S.
- Occupation: Actor
- Years active: 1954–2008
- Spouse: Elizabeth Burt (1957–2006)
- Children: 1
- Family: Steve Lukather (nephew)

Paul David Lukather (August 24, 1926 – October 9, 2014) was an American actor known for his work on stage, television, film, and video games. He was Steve Lukather's uncle.

== Career ==
Lukather graduated from Drake University and Yale University. He won the Barter Award and acted in productions at the Barter Theatre.

Lukather's television appearances included Perry Mason, The Fugitive, The F.B.I., Mission: Impossible, and Cannon. Along with his work in television and film, he also worked as a voice-over artist for video games, including the Legacy of Kain series, in which he voiced the character Vorador. He also voiced the character President James Johnson for Metal Gear Solid 2: Sons of Liberty.

Lukather died on October 9, 2014, aged 88.

== Filmography ==
=== Live-action ===
- Make Haste to Live (1954) – Deputy
- Mohawk (1956) – Angry Settler (uncredited)
- Drango (1957) – Burke
- Highway Patrol (1957) - Ed Borden, reporter
- The True Story of Lynn Stuart (1958) – Plainclothesman (uncredited)
- "Have Gun Will Travel" (1958) S1 E32 "The Five Books of Owen Deaver" – The French Kid
- Dinosaurus! (1960) – Chuck
- 77 Sunset Strip (1960, TV series) – Scooter / Steve Lucy
- Rawhide (1960) – Gus Price in S2:E28, "Incident of the Murder Steer"
- All Hands on Deck (1961) – Sailor (uncredited)
- Hands of a Stranger (1962) – Dr. Gil Harding
- Captain Newman, M.D. (1963) – Pilot (uncredited)
- Shock Treatment (1964) – 2nd Young Interne (uncredited)
- I'd Rather Be Rich (1964) – Reporter (uncredited)
- Fate Is the Hunter (1964) – News Reporter (uncredited)
- The Outer Limits (1964–1965, TV series) – Ed Nichols / Official
- The Man from U.N.C.L.E. (1965, TV series) – Capt. Ahmed
- Bonanza (1960–1965, TV series) – Cletus / Robie
- Get Smart (1966) – Baccardo
- Perry Mason (1963–1966, TV series) – Dennis 'Duke' Maronek / Alan Jaris / Chuck Emmett
- Alvarez Kelly (1966) – Capt. Webster
- The Fugitive (1964–1966, TV series) – First deputy / Barney / McNeil's Photographer
- 12 O'Clock High (1965–1966, TV series) – Staff Sgt. Pargon / Lieutenant O'Toole
- The Way West (1967) – Mr. Turley
- The F.B.I. (1966–1968, TV series) – Lee Holm / Jack Allis / Phil Sandrich / Eddie
- Mission: Impossible (1967–1969, TV series) – Lieutenant / Moisev
- Bright Promise (1969, TV series) – William Ferguson (1969–1971)
- The Mod Squad (1969, TV series) – Mike Reynolds
- Mannix (1973, TV series) – Gerald Stockton
- Adam-12 (1975, TV series) – Dave Morris
- Cannon (1973–1976, TV series) – Dr. Andrew Stoner / Morgan
- Starsky and Hutch (1977, TV series) – Max Frost
- Hot Lead and Cold Feet (1978) – Cowboy 2
- Friday the 13th: The Final Chapter (1984) – Doctor
- Cagney & Lacey (1985, TV series) – Garth
- Cheers (1986, TV series) – Mr. Morton
- Chloe's Prayer (2006) – Paul

=== Video game ===
- Blood Omen: Legacy of Kain (1996) – Vorador, Bane (voice)
- Alundra 2 (2000) – Narrator / High Priest A / Pirate A (voice)
- Soul Reaver 2 (2001) – Vorador (voice)
- Metal Gear Solid 2: Sons of Liberty (2001) – James Johnson (voice)
- Blood Omen 2 (2002) – Vorador (voice)
- Arc the Lad: Twilight of the Spirits (2003) – Zev (voice)
- Legacy of Kain: Defiance (2003) – Vorador (voice)
