= Elder God =

Elder God may refer to:

- Elder God (Cthulhu Mythos), a type of fictional deity added to H. P. Lovecraft's Cthulhu Mythos.
- The Elder God, a video-game character in the Legacy of Kain series
- Elder Gods (Mortal Kombat), fictional entities in the Mortal Kombat mythos
