= Richard Doyle (actor) =

American actor

- Other name: Richard Doyal
- Occupation: Actor
- Years active: 1971–present

Richard Doyle, sometimes credited as Richard Doyal, is an American actor.

== Early life ==
At age six, Richard Doyle had his first taste of entertainment when a recreation director at a naval base in Norfolk, Virginia, put him in front of a crowd of Navy wives; he sang "Oh, You Beautiful Doll".

His acting education included studies at Long Beach City College.

== Career ==
Doyle had an early role in the second season of Barnaby Jones in an episode titled "Blind Terror" (September 16, 1973). He has appeared on such TV series as Cheers, Voyage to the Bottom of the Sea, Charlie's Angels, Dallas, M*A*S*H, Cannon and The Mod Squad, and worked with Ernest Borgnine on the science fiction series Future Cop.

Doyle has also acted in non-traditional films for the museum field. In 1984, coinciding with the 1984 Summer Olympics in Los Angeles, he performed in a special effects holographic show entitled "Wizard of Change", at the California Science Center, for the General Motors-hosted exhibit "Wheels of Change" which, following the Olympics, was transferred to the Museum of Science and Industry in Chicago. The 3D illusion show, designed by the award-winning experience designer Bob Rogers and the design team BRC Imagination Arts, involved Doyle as a charming wizard character who explains that manufacturing is like magic that can transform base materials into modern miracles. Doyle worked again with Rogers and BRC Imagination Arts in 2005 when he acted in the leading role for an educational 4D special effects film they produced for the Abraham Lincoln Presidential Library and Museum in Springfield, Illinois, "Lincoln's Eyes". In this educational film, presented on three screens with supporting dimensional sets and in-theater atmospheric special effects, Doyle played the role of an artist who narrates the show and discusses how he came about exploring the subject of Abraham Lincoln through Lincoln's life events.

Beyond film, Doyle has earned much of his living as a voice actor, but says that he always preferred theatre work. He was a founding member of the South Coast Repertory theatre company.

== Filmography ==
=== Film ===
List of film performances
Year	Title	Role
1978	Coma	Pathologist
1984	Mass Appeal	Priest
1986	Trick or Treat	Voice role
1997	Air Force One	Colonel Bob Jackson
2012	Heathens and Thieves	Bill
2017	Abduction of Angie	Leonard

=== Television ===
List of television performances
Year	Title	Role	Notes
1968	12 O'Clock High	Capt Glen King	1 episode
1971	Night Gallery	Bruce	Episode: "Class of '99"
1973	Cannon		Episode: "Murder for Murder"
1976	M*A*S*H	M.P.	Episode: "Hawkeye Get Your Gun"
1977	Black Sheep Squadron	Bartender	Episode: "The Last Mission Over Sengai"
1977	Switch	Station Manager	Episode: "Eyewitness"
1978	Police Story	Alexander Davis	Episode: "The Broken Badge"
1978	Project U.F.O.	Sargent Brown, Alex Sanders	2 episodes
1978	The Rockford Files	Paramedic	Episode: "The Attractive Nuisance"
1979	Barnaby Jones	Alan Simmons	Episode: "Design for Madness"
1979	Lou Grant	Paul Glover	Episode: "Bomb"
1979	Son-Rise: A Miracle of Love	Herb	Television film
1980	The Women's Room		Television film
1982	The Greatest American Hero	Biff Anderson	Episode: "Just Another Three-Ring Circus"
1983	Fame	Priest	Episode: "Ending on a High Note"
1985	Heart of a Champion: The Ray Mancini Story	Journalist #1	Television film
1986	Dallas	Thomas Perry	Episode: "Hello... Goodbye... Hello"
1986	Dress Gray	AIA Agent	2 episodes
1987	Mr. Belvedere	TV Announcer, Man #2	2 episodes
1989–1993	Cheers	Mr. Walter Gaines	8 episodes
1989	Knots Landing	Walter Glendon	Episode: "The Spin Doctor"
1991	Down Home	Morton	Episode: "Evian Spelled Backwards Is Naive"
1996	NYPD Blue	Paul Wilson	Episode: "A Tushful of Dollars"
1996	Once You Meet a Stranger	Mr. Anthony	Television film
1996	Sisters	John Morris	Episode: "Nothing Personal"
1998	Pensacola: Wings of Gold	Edward	Episode: "Power Play"
1998	The Lost World	Various roles	Television film
1998	The Practice	Judge Warren Halperin	2 episodes
1999	The Pretender	Dr. Wolverton	Episode: "Wild Child"
2001	The Lot	Dr. Anderson	Episode: "The Accident"
2006	Justice	Judge Kurtz	Episode: "Prior Convictions"
2010	Brothers & Sisters	Benjamin Wright	Episode: "Lights Out"
2011	Raising Hope	Narrator	Episode: "Mongooses"
2017	NCIS	1st Veteran	Episode: "The Wall"

=== Animation ===
List of animation performances
Year	Title	Role	Notes	Source
1987	Sky Commanders	"Brooks" Baxter	2 episodes	
1991–1992	The Legend of Prince Valiant	Harold, Soldier	2 episodes	
1995	Aaahh!!! Real Monsters	Chippendale, Little Chip	Episode: "A Room with No Viewfinder"	
1995	Batman: The Animated Series	Ernie	Episode: "The Lion and the Unicorn"	
1996	Pinky and the Brain	Phileas Fogg	Episode: "Around the World in 80 Narfs"	
1996	The Real Adventures of Jonny Quest	DB Graves	Episode: "Manhattan Maneater"	
1996–1998	Life with Louie	Mr. Stevenson, FBI Agent	3 episodes	
1997	The Legend of Calamity Jane	Additional voices	13 episodes	
1998	The New Batman Adventures	Harry	Episode: "Love Is a Croc"	
2001–2004	Justice League	Assembly Leader, Dr. Louis, Doctor	5 episodes	
2006–2007	Ben 10	Enoch, Forever King/Driscoll, additional voices	8 episodes	
2008–2009	Wolverine and the X-Men	Robert Kelly	7 episodes	
2010	Lego: The Adventures of Clutch Powers	Hogar the Troll		
2011	Ben 10: Ultimate Alien	Driscoll	2 episodes	
2013	Batman: The Dark Knight Returns - Part 1	Mayor of Gotham City		
2013	Regular Show	Balding Old Guy	Episode: "The Last Laserdisc Player"	
2017	Spider-Man	Police Officer	Episode: "Horizon High"	

=== Video games ===
List of video game performances
Year	Title	Role	Source
1996	Blood Omen: Legacy of Kain	Moebius, Anarcrothe, Nupraptor	
1999	Legacy of Kain: Soul Reaver	Moebius, Tomb Guardian	
1999	Gabriel Knight 3: Blood of the Sacred, Blood of the Damned	John Wilkes	
2000	Grandia II	Zera, Gonzola, Village Chief	
2001	Soul Reaver 2	Moebius	
2001	Star Wars Rogue Squadron II: Rogue Leader	Rebel Wingman, Transport Captain	
2002	Eternal Darkness: Sanity's Requiem	Pious Augustus, Ulyaoth	
2003	Legacy of Kain: Defiance	Moebius	
2004	Metal Gear Solid 3: Snake Eater	The Fury	
2004	Ninja Gaiden	Narrator	
2004	Onimusha Blade Warriors	Nobunaga Oda	
2004	Onimusha 3: Demon Siege	Nobunaga Oda	
2004	X-Men Legends	Beast	
2005	Age of Empires III	Alain Magnan	
2005	X-Men Legends II: Rise of Apocalypse	Beast	
2006	Metal Gear Solid: Portable Ops	High Official	
2007	Ben 10: Protector of Earth	Enoch, Fangface	
2008	Metal Gear Solid 4: Guns of the Patriots	Big Boss	
2008	Too Human	Pilot, Henchman #6	
2010	Ben 10 Ultimate Alien: Cosmic Destruction	Enoch	
2010	Splatterhouse	Dr. West	
2011	Ace Combat: Assault Horizon	Pierre La Pointe	
2011	Warhammer 40,000: Dawn of War II – Retribution	Lord General Castor	
2012	Ben 10: Omniverse	Driscoll	
2012	Starhawk	Cutter	
2013	Star Wars: The Old Republic - Rise of the Hutt Cartel	Shalim Avesta	
2014	Murdered: Soul Suspect	Security Guard, Detective Howell, Examiner	

=== Theme park attractions ===
List of theme park attraction performances
Year	Title	Role
1992	Phantom Theater	Maestro, Usher (voices)
2026	Phantom Theater: Opening Nightmare	Maestro, Usher (voices)
