= Simon Templeman =

British actor

- Templeman in December 2008
- Born: 28 January 1954 (age 72)
- Occupation: Actor
- Years active: 1983–present
- Spouse: Rosalind Chao
- Children: 2

Simon Templeman (born 28 January 1954) is an English actor.

== Career ==
Templeman is known for his video game roles as Kain in Legacy of Kain, Gabriel Roman in the Uncharted series, Loghain in Dragon Age, and Admiral Han'Gerrel vas Neema and Gavin Archer in Mass Effect.

He played the alien father Larry Bird in the sitcom The Neighbors.

== Personal life ==
Templeman is married to actress Rosalind Chao, with whom he has two children.

== Filmography ==
=== Voice acting ===
==== Film ====
Year	Title	Role	Notes
2022	Green Lantern: Beware My Power	Sardath, console voice	Direct-to-video
2025	The Witcher: Sirens of the Deep	King Usveldt	Netflix Animated Feature
2026	Batman: Knightfall – Part 1: Knightfall	Alfred Pennyworth	Direct-to-video

==== Television ====
Year	Title	Role	Notes
1991	TaleSpin	Rick Sky	Episode: "Bygones"
1991	James Bond Jr.	Trevor Noseworthy IV	63 episodes
1991–93	The Legend of Prince Valiant	Sir Mordred, Sir Gideon	14 episodes
1995	Biker Mice from Mars	Sir Mordred	2 episodes
1995–96	Fantastic Four	Doctor Doom	3 episodes
1996–97	The Incredible Hulk	Doctor Doom	2 episodes
2002–04	Totally Spies!	Dr. Gilee	2 episodes
2005	Higglytown Heroes	Banker Hero	Episode: "Wayne's Pieces of Gold"
2005–06	Loonatics Unleashed	Dr. Dare	2 episodes

==== Video games ====
Year	Title	Role	Notes	Source
1994	Star Wars: TIE Fighter	Civilian		
1996	Blood Omen: Legacy of Kain	Kain		
1999	Legacy of Kain: Soul Reaver	Kain, Dumah		
1999	Gabriel Knight 3: Blood of the Sacred, Blood of the Damned	Prince James, MacDougall		
1999	Crusaders of Might and Magic	Additional voices		
2001	Soul Reaver 2	Kain		
2002	Blood Omen 2	Kain		
2003	Star Wars: Knights of the Old Republic	Additional voices		
2003	Legacy of Kain: Defiance	Kain		
2004	The Bard's Tale	Additional voices		
2004	EverQuest II	Additional voices	Also Desert of Flames	
2004	The Lord of the Rings: The Battle for Middle-earth	Gondorians, Tutorial Narrator		
2005	Jade Empire	Kai Lan the Serpent		
2005	Neopets: The Darkest Faerie	Gelert Assassin	Credited as Simon Templeton	
2006	The Lord of the Rings: The Battle for Middle-earth II	Gondorians	Also The Rise of the Witch-king	
2006	Final Fantasy XII	Judge Magister Zargabaath		
2007	Uncharted: Drake's Fortune	Gabriel Roman		
2008	Rise of the Argonauts	Pelias		
2008	SOCOM U.S. Navy SEALs: Confrontation	Robert Whitney		
2009	The Lord of the Rings: Conquest	Narrator	Uncredited	
2009	Uncharted 2: Among Thieves	Gabriel Roman	Uncredited; Multiplayer only	
2009	Dragon Age: Origins	Loghain	Also Awakening DLC	
2010	Mass Effect 2	Admiral Han'Gerrel vas Neema	Also Overlord DLC	
2010	God of War III	Peirithous		
2011	Tactics Ogre: Wheel of Fortune	Male Narrator		
2011	Uncharted 3: Drake's Deception	Gabriel Roman	Multiplayer only	
2011	Infinity Blade II	Various		
2011	Star Wars: The Old Republic	Various		
2012	Kingdoms of Amalur: Reckoning	Khamazandu, additional voices		
2012	Mass Effect 3	Admiral Han'Gerrel vas Neema, Dr. Gavin Archer		
2012	Diablo III	Haedrig, Blacksmith	Also Reaper of Souls	
2012	Darksiders II	Absalom, Avatar of Chaos		
2013	Dead Space 3	Jacob Danik		
2013	God of War: Ascension	Archimedes		
2014	Wolfenstein: The New Order	Prison Inmate		
2014	Dragon Age: Inquisition	Loghain		
2014	World of Warcraft: Warlords of Draenor	Additional voices		
2015	Massive Chalice	Male Chalice		
2016	Uncharted 4: A Thief's End	Gabriel Roman, additional voices	Multiplayer only	
2016	World of Warcraft: Legion	Additional voices		
2018	World of Warcraft: Battle for Azeroth	Marshal Everit Reade, Thaelin Darkanval		
2018	Fallout 76	Derek Garrison, Mothman Cultists	Wastelanders DLC	
2020	World of Warcraft: Shadowlands	Tenaval, Cryptkeeper Kassir		
2024	Dragon Age: The Veilguard	Mayor Julius, Makal Damas, Halos		

=== Live-action ===
==== Film ====
Year	Title	Role	Notes
1990	The Russia House	Whitehall	
1995	Live Nude Girls	Bob	
2014	I Am Soldier	Command Centre Official	
2020	She's in Portland	Nigel	

==== Television ====
Year	Title	Role	Notes
1983	The Professionals	Neville Grant	Episode: "Cry Wolf"
1988	The Fear	Chris	4 episodes
1988	Screen Two	D.S. Kiley	Episode: "Reasonable Force"
1990	Star Trek: The Next Generation	John Bates	Episode: "The Defector"
1990	Father Dowling Mysteries	Foster	Episode: "The Legacy Mystery"
1992	Melrose Place	Kurt	Episode: "For Love or Money"
1993	Silent Cries	Johnny Leighton	Television film Credited as Simon Templeton
1993	Moon Over Miami	D. W. Ward	Episode: "Black River Bride"
1994	Mad About You	Martin	Episode: "Instant Karma"
1994	Amelia Earhart: The Final Flight	Harry Balfour	Television film
1994–95	Northern Exposure	Cal Ingraham	4 episodes
1995	Ned and Stacey	Nigel Davies	Episode: "Take My Wife, Please"
1996	Partners	Carl	Episode: "Can We Keep Her, Dad?"
1996	High Society	The Burglar	Episode: "The Family Jewels"
1996	Can't Hurry Love	Waiter	Episode: "The Elizabeth Taylor Episode"
1996	Lois & Clark: The New Adventures of Superman	Lord Nor	2 episodes
1997	Murphy Brown	Laurence	Episode: "You Don't Know Jackal"
1997	Temporarily Yours	Ethan	Episode: "The Voice of Reason"
1997	Don King: Only in America	Keith Bradshaw	Television film
1997	The Pretender	Darrin Faxon	Episode: "Exposed"
1998	Home Improvement	Simon Downing-Chubb	Episode: "Taylor Got Game"
1998	Chicago Hope	Nigel Wiggans	Episode: "Tantric Turkey"
1999	Zoe, Duncan, Jack & Jane	D'Art	Episode: "Hard Cheese on Zoe"
2000	NYPD Blue	Andrew Conover	Episode: "Tea and Sympathy"
2000	Bull	Roger Lacey	Episode: "Visit"
2001–05	Charmed	Angel of Death	3 episodes
2002	Philly	Henry Carto	Episode: "Thanks for the Mammaries"
2002	The Division	Sebastian	Episode: "Brave New World"
2002–03	Just Shoot Me!	Simon Leeds	11 episodes
2003	Monk	Karl Sebastian	Episode: "Mr. Monk Goes to the Theater"
2003	Angel	Matthias Pavayne	Episode: "Hell Bound"
2004	24	Trevor Tomlinson	Episode: "Day 3: 5:00 a.m.-6:00 a.m."
2005–06	Related	Leo	2 episodes
2007	ER	Gareth	Episode: "Coming Home"
2011	The Event	Dr. Ellis	Episode: "Face Off"
2012–14	The Neighbors	Larry Bird	44 episodes
2015–16	House of Lies	Teddy Grammatico	3 episodes
2016	The Odd Couple	Nigel	Episode: "Oscar's Overture"
2016	Modern Family	Simon Hastings	Episode: "Crazy Train"
2017	Ray Donovan	Gustavo	Episode: "If I Should Fall from Grace with God"
2019	Elementary	Ronald Adair	Episode: "Their Last Bow"
2021	Acapulco	Bronté	Episode: "Invisible Touch"
2022	The Orville	Krill Ambassador	Episode: "Shadow Realms"
2026	Wonder Man	Richard	Episode: "Call Back"
2026	Paradise	Dr. Chase	Episode: "Exodus" (Season 2, Episode 8)
