= Soul Reaver 2 =

2001 video game

- Cover art featuring the main protagonist Raziel wielding the titular Soul Reaver.
- Developer: Crystal Dynamics (Note: Ported to Windows by Nixxes Software)
- Publisher: Eidos Interactive
- Director: Amy Hennig
- Producer: Rosaura Sandoval
- Designers: Riley Cooper; Richard Lemarchand
- Programmer: Marc David
- Artist: Daniel Cabuco
- Writers: Amy Hennig; Paul Jenkins; Kurt Harland; Richard Lemarchand
- Composers: Kurt Harland; Jim Hedges
- Series: Legacy of Kain
- Platforms: PlayStation 2 Windows
- Release: PlayStation 2: NA: October 30, 2001; EU: November 23, 2001; Windows: NA: November 19, 2001; EU: November 30, 2001
- Genre: Action-adventure
- Mode: Single-player

Soul Reaver 2 is a 2001 action-adventure video game developed by Crystal Dynamics and published by Eidos Interactive. It is a sequel to Legacy of Kain: Soul Reaver and the third game in the Legacy of Kain series. Originally developed as a PlayStation and Dreamcast project, it was reworked into a PlayStation 2 and Windows title in early production. Soul Reaver 2 was followed by two sequels, Blood Omen 2 and Legacy of Kain: Defiance, in 2002 and 2003.

The game continues the adventures of the vampire-turned-wraith Raziel, the protagonist of Soul Reaver. Though Raziel initially seeks to exact revenge on Kain, his murderer and former master, this objective is superseded by a higher quest for knowledge and a desire for freedom, as he finds himself manipulated by those he encounters and begins to learn more about his former life as a human. Traveling through history, he gradually exposes the truth behind his own past and destiny, as he uncovers the history of Nosgoth.

Hoping to deliver a more story-focused, cinematic experience than Soul Reaver, Crystal Dynamics researched time travel fiction, theology, and the works of Joseph Campbell when creating Soul Reaver 2's narrative. Critics praised the game for its involved storyline, visuals and puzzles, but criticized it for lacking replay value and ending without a definite resolution. Its developers felt the final product fell short of their ambitions, but it performed well commercially, and was included on Sony's "Greatest Hits" list.

A remastered version of Soul Reaver 2 and its predecessor were released on December 10, 2024 as Legacy of Kain: Soul Reaver 1 & 2 Remastered.

== Gameplay ==
Raziel with the wraith-blade in the Air Forge area. The icon in the lower left signifies that the light-elemental version of the Reaver is equipped, whereas the coil in the lower right indicates the player's health.

Soul Reaver 2 is a single-player action-adventure game. The player controls Raziel, a ghostly "ex-vampire", from a third-person perspective. Gameplay, which is based on the original Soul Reaver, prompts the player to shift between two planes of existence—the material and spectral realms—to progress. The material realm represents the physical, living world, whereas the spectral realm is a warped mirror of this environment. In the spectral realm, the player cannot manipulate objects and weapons, and water is insubstantial. Raziel's health slowly regenerates in the spectral world, whereas it gradually depletes in the material realm. If Raziel runs out of health in the material world, he is shunted into the spectral realm, and if killed in this plane, he returns to the nearest checkpoint. Save points enable players to record their progress and continue their game.

Raziel retains most of the powers he possessed in the previous game, such as the abilities to glide, climb walls, fire bolts of telekinetic energy, and swim. To sustain his strength and travel between the planes, he must devour souls; this is typically accomplished by defeating enemies. The game's combat consists of a hack and slash system, entailing the use of combinations of attacks before executing a finishing move. Human enemies exist only in the material world, and include mercenaries, demon hunters, and the Sarafan, a monastic order of vampire hunters; other material creatures include dogs, thralls, and mutants. Sluagh are enemies who exclusively inhabit the spirit world, whereas cross-planar beings such as demons and shades can pursue the player between both realms. Enemies leave behind souls when killed, which replenish Raziel's health once consumed.

The player's primary weapon is a ghostly version of the Soul Reaver sword, referred to as the wraith-blade. The wraith-blade is symbiotically bound to Raziel, and can be summoned or dismissed at any time in the material world, but, if overused, the sword can turn against Raziel, siphoning his health. Other weapons include claws, swords and spears. As the game progresses, the player encounters magical forges which imbue the wraith-blade with elemental powers associated with darkness, light, air, and fire. These enhancements have various uses, but are only available in the material realm. If Raziel shifts, he loses his active elemental imbuement, and must re-forge the blade at locations scattered throughout the game world.

== Plot ==
=== Setting ===
Soul Reaver 2 is set in Nosgoth, a fictional land with fantasy aspects. In the first game in the series, Blood Omen: Legacy of Kain, the vampire Kain embarks on a journey to restore the Pillars of Nosgoth—nine supernatural edifices which are inextricably tied to the health of the land, but become corrupted. During his adventure, Moebius, a manipulative sorcerer, tricks Kain into orchestrating the destruction of the vampire race: Kain is left the last surviving vampire in Nosgoth. After restoring eight of the Pillars, Kain discovers that he would need to sacrifice his own life to restore the final corrupt one. Realizing that his death would ensure the annihilation of his species, he refuses to kill himself. This triggers the Pillars' collapse, and dooms the world to eternal decay, but enables Kain to live on and revive the vampire race.

By the time of Soul Reaver, 1500 years later, Kain is a despotic emperor, his vampires dominate the land, and Nosgoth hinges on the brink of collapse. The Elder God, a demiurge-like entity, lurks beneath Nosgoth and controls the cycle of reincarnation; the vampires, whose biological immortality opposes his doctrine, are his enemies. In Soul Reaver, Raziel—Kain's lieutenant—is executed by Kain, but The Elder God resurrects him and encourages him to exact revenge. Traversing the wasteland and murdering the vampires, Raziel confronts Kain, who attacks him with the Soul Reaver sword, imbued with a spirit which absorbs its victims' souls. The Soul Reaver shatters when it strikes Raziel, and the blade's spirit binds itself to his arm. His motives still mysterious, Kain lures Raziel through a time portal into Nosgoth's past.

In Soul Reaver 2, it is established that, in Nosgoth, fatalism is an actuality—history is immutable, and all individuals are subject to predestination. Raziel, due to his paradoxical destiny, is the only exception to this rule—his presence enables temporal paradoxes to be triggered, altering history for better or worse. Kain relies on Raziel's free will in a bid to outsmart Moebius and resolve the dilemma he faced in Blood Omen, ultimately hoping to enable both the restored Pillars and the vampire race to co-exist in the future. Soul Reaver 2 opens as Raziel emerges from the time slip and is greeted by Moebius, having arrived in an era 30 years prior to the events of Blood Omen. Two further time periods, 100 years after and 500 years before Blood Omen respectively, are also explored as the story progresses.

=== Characters ===
Raziel returns as the protagonist of Soul Reaver 2. In Soul Reaver, Raziel discovered that he was once a human and a leading member of the vampire-hunting Sarafan brotherhood, and his epiphanies drive the conflict in the story. Kain, the antagonist of Soul Reaver, appears as a non-player character in cutscenes, urging Raziel to unearth his destiny. Moebius the Time Streamer, a sorcerer who was a villain in Blood Omen and had a cameo at the end of Soul Reaver, is a primary antagonist of Soul Reaver 2 who attempts to manipulate Raziel into destroying Kain - it is revealed that he is an agent of The Elder God, Raziel's ally and guide in Soul Reaver, who is slowly established as a more sinister entity. Ariel, a specter bound to the Pillars who featured in Blood Omen and Soul Reaver, returns, and the vampire Vorador, also from Blood Omen, assists Raziel early in the game. The ancient vampire Janos Audron, a new character who was previously only mentioned in Blood Omen, acts as Raziel's mentor towards the end of the story.

=== Story ===
The plot continues by summarizing the first game's ending: Raziel confronts Kain in Nosgoth's wasteland and pursues him through a portal leading to the past. Moebius, the leader of a vampire-hunting crusade in this age, coerces Raziel to re-embrace his former heritage as a Sarafan vampire hunter by killing Kain. Though Raziel is initially eager to do so, his enthusiasm wanes over time as he witnesses the ruthlessness of Moebius's soldiers. Kain, who is destined to die at Raziel's hands in this era, implores Raziel to thwart fate and instead facilitate his quest to restore the Pillars. After he learns that Moebius serves The Elder God, and that he has thus been duped, Raziel faces a decision: indulge his lust for vengeance and submit to fate by killing Kain, or defy his cohorts and exercise his free will by exerting mercy.

While exploring this period, Raziel discovers evidence that two ancient races waged war in Nosgoth's distant past. One race created the Pillars to banish their adversaries, but the enemy race - the Hylden - retaliated with a curse which transformed the Pillars' architects into the first vampires. Kain explains that, had he sacrificed himself, the vampire race—the rightful inheritors of the Pillars—would have become extinct. Raziel chooses to spare Kain, causing a paradox; history reshuffles itself to accommodate the extension of Kain's life. He, however, refuses to indulge Kain's plans any further, instead opting to explore his own past. Vorador tells Raziel that the last of the ancient vampires, Janos Audron, held the key to Raziel's destiny, but Janos was murdered by the Sarafan five centuries ago.

Deciding to speak with Janos, Raziel orders Moebius to send him further back in time. Moebius deceives Raziel, instead conveying him over a century into the future, where he and The Elder God highlight the consequences of the Pillars' destruction to turn Raziel against Kain. Raziel navigates the future era and finds his own way back to the age of the Sarafan and Janos Audron; there, Janos presents Raziel with the Reaver, a younger version of the physical Soul Reaver blade which will later house a soul-devouring spirit. Suddenly, a group of Sarafan led by Raziel's former, human self launch an ambush, and Janos sacrifices himself. Raziel swears vengeance as Janos dies, and pursues the attackers onto the Sarafan stronghold. In the Stronghold, Moebius confronts Raziel one last time and admits that his harmless, foolish persona was only an act to ultimately manipulate Raziel into attacking the Sarafan Stronghold at the same time as Vorador. He then provokes Raziel into picking up the physical Soul Reaver. Overcome with rage, Raziel takes the blade while Moebius ominously warns him that he is “wrong again.” Moebius prevents Raziel from killing him directly, but he deceives Raziel into using the Reaver to kill his former Sarafan brethren — and ultimately his past self — leading Raziel to renounce his Sarafan identity. The confrontation also reinforces Moebius's recurring theme that Raziel's attempts to exert free will are futile within a predetermined timeline.

Raziel lying impaled by the physical Soul Reaver on the Ouroboros floor engraving, a symbol of paradox, eternity, and cyclical rebirth central to Raziel's fate in the story.

The wraith-blade attached to Raziel's arm, over-aroused after the deaths of the Sarafan, suddenly seizes control of the physical Reaver, and impales Raziel; Raziel, horrified, then realizes his destiny. He himself has always been the ravenous spirit inside the Reaver, and therefore is fated to be stuck in a time loop; the sword shattered against him in Soul Reaver because it was unable to consume itself. As the Reaver begins to pull Raziel's soul into the blade, Kain steps in at the last instant and stops the parasitic binding — a gesture both of gratitude for Raziel sparing him earlier and of defiance against fate. This act destroys the inevitability of the timeline, creating the most profound historical shift in Nosgoth and drastically altering the destiny that Moebius and the Elder God had engineered. However, this paradox strains Nosgoth's history too far, enabling the Hylden to return and jeopardize his ambition to restore the Pillars. Amidst Kain's dismay and warning to not revive Janos Audron, Raziel slips back into the spirit realm and realizes that the wraith-blade is still bound to him, and despairingly laments that his destiny has not been changed, but merely postponed.

== Development ==
Even before the release of Soul Reaver, Crystal Dynamics were aware that they would create a follow-up, but had no "master plan". Soul Reaver uses the engine of Gex: Enter the Gecko. Prior to the beginning of development, director Amy Hennig emphasized that the role-playing game elements of Blood Omen, stronger dialogue and character interaction, a greater variety of acquirable mechanics, and wider use of the spectral realm should figure into the sequel. Pre-production began in late 1999, and the project briefly entered development for the PlayStation and Dreamcast with a targeted release date in fall of 2000. However, Sony unveiled the PlayStation's successor, the PlayStation 2, at the Tokyo Game Show in September 1999. The development team felt that PlayStation 2's capabilities would elevate the game's graphics and animation, and as a result, worked to port Soul Reaver 2 onto the new hardware over several weeks. The team was given approval to switch to the PlayStation 2 after creating a proof-of-concept demo for E3 2000, and the game was announced as an console exclusive title for the PlayStation 2, dropping the Dreamcast and original PlayStation versions in the process.

Executive producer Andrew Bennett analogized the developers' design sensibilities to the non-linear nature of Nintendo's The Legend of Zelda and Mario franchises, but said it was decided that Soul Reaver 2 would not be a "traditional 'complete a level, fight a boss' type of game". Level designers constructed a generalized puzzle and object-interaction system, helping to prevent an undesired re-emergence of Soul Reaver's abundant block puzzles. Instead of creating more inherent and optional abilities for Raziel, they focused on including new, mandatory enhancements for the Soul Reaver weapon.

On the decision to downplay Raziel's quest for vengeance against Kain in this sequel, Hennig explained, "he's being pretty simple-minded, he's sort of being very black-and-white in his interpretation of things, and being kind of petulant [...] he's not really as heroic as Kain is, and he has a lot of stuff to figure out, basically, about what's going on". Soul Reaver 2 was crafted to feature a more cinematic, story-focused experience than its predecessor, which the developers felt had been "patchy" in this regard. It entered production after Blood Omen 2, but shipped almost six months before the latter game. A separate team within Crystal Dynamics, with creative autonomy, developed Blood Omen 2, and contradictions created by its scenario hindered work on Soul Reaver 2. After researching time travel fiction, Hennig devised a subplot concerning temporal paradoxes to resolve the continuity problems between both titles, and established that Blood Omen 2's story is a product of the final paradox created when Kain saves Raziel at the end of Soul Reaver 2. Other themes were inspired by the works of Joseph Campbell, Islamic art and culture, and theology surrounding gnosticism. Concepts which formulated the crux of the story included the idea "that the only way a hero can ever succeed is by following his own path", and the question, "can you change history or not? And if so, what does it mean to change history - in terms of being responsible for the repercussions?"

British comic book writer Paul Jenkins was drafted by Crystal Dynamics to help refine the game's script. Though Soul Reaver features a variety of boss encounters, Soul Reaver 2 does not; this was a conscious decision on the part of the staff, to ensure the game's pacing more closely emulated that of a novel or a film, although near the end of the game, the Sarafan commanders including Raziel's human self are considered somewhat as a "bosses" since they are more challenging than the usual enemies during the game. While expanding the series' fiction, Hennig sought to take people back to the characters and mythology of the original Blood Omen, and built on its latent themes, including issues of fatalism, ethical dilemma and morality. In an interview, she stated that "the game will have a proper ending this time", and said "it has a conclusion. It's the end of a chapter. There won't be a cliffhanger". However, the story needed to be restructured several times before its completion, and, like the original Soul Reaver, many planned areas and abilities were excised, including three elemental forges (earth, water and spirit), more Reaver enhancements, and nine "spell-type things". She explained that the project's small programming crew, its switch to the PlayStation 2, and its limited 17 month production schedule had forced the team to "pick their battles", leading numerous features to be simplified or eliminated. Commenting on the final product, lead designer Richard Lemarchand said that Soul Reaver 2 "fell short of what the team had wanted to accomplish. In particular, some puzzles were too opaque, the combat was rather one-dimensional, [and the story] ended without a decent resolution".

=== Audio ===
Soul Reaver 2 was composed by Kurt Harland, of American band Information Society, and Jim Hedges. Harland and Hedges had already collaborated on Soul Reaver, but Hedges had not previously contributed compositions. The adaptive audio framework from the previous game returned; depending on signals from the game in certain situations—such as combat, puzzles, danger or suspense—the game's soundtrack actively changes. Music from both Soul Reaver and Soul Reaver 2 was released on a promotional soundtrack in 2001.

Gordon Hunt returned as the game's recording director, with Kris Zimmerman as casting director. Voice actors from both Blood Omen and Soul Reaver reprised their roles, with Michael Bell playing Raziel and Simon Templeman portraying Kain. The Elder God was again voiced by Tony Jay, Richard Doyle voiced Moebius, and Anna Gunn played Ariel. Paul Lukather, absent from Soul Reaver, rejoined the cast as Vorador. René Auberjonois, the only newcomer to the Legacy of Kain series, provided the voice of Janos Audron.

== Release ==
Publisher Eidos Interactive was "broadly satisfied" with the commercial performance of Soul Reaver 2, which sold more than 500,000 copies by June 2002. Later, Sony re-released it under the "Greatest Hits" label. Shortly after the initial PlayStation 2 release on October 30, 2001, the Windows port developed by Nixxes Software shipped on November 19, 2001. The PlayStation 2 release featured bonus material, including voice casting outtakes, artworks, a soundtrack, trailers, the game's dialogue script, and a compilation of Nosgoth's history. In 2012, digital distribution services GOG.com and Steam made the Windows port of Soul Reaver 2 available for purchase.

== Reception ==
Reception

Aggregate score
Aggregator	Score	
Aggregator	PC	PS2
Metacritic	77/100	80/100

Review scores
Publication	Score	
Publication	PC	PS2
Computer Gaming World	N/A	2.5/5
Electronic Gaming Monthly	N/A	6/5.5/6
Game Informer	N/A	8.75/10
GamePro	N/A	3.5/5
GameRevolution	N/A	B
GameSpot	8/10	8.8/10
GameZone	9/10	N/A
IGN	8.8/10	9/10
Next Generation	N/A	4/5
Official U.S. PlayStation Magazine	N/A	6/10
PC Gamer (US)	79/100	N/A

Soul Reaver 2 received "generally favorable" reviews, according to review aggregator Metacritic. Various reviewers held its storytelling, visuals and sound in high regard, but described its gameplay as dull and unsatisfying. Doug Perry of IGN praised the game's dark atmosphere and intriguing story, but said that it can become tiresome and drag on. He thought the "haughtiness" and drama of the dialogue, particularly between Raziel and Kain, was often overdone, and noted that its gameplay was near identical to that of its predecessor but with less replay value. Perry enjoyed the new puzzles involving the elemental powers of the Reaver for being more complex and diverse than the block puzzles of Soul Reaver, and praised the combat system. He gave the game a score of 9.0, but in his later review for Defiance, he revised his opinion, saying this rating was "way too high" and "that game told a great story, but just didn't deserve that score".

Joe Fielder of GameSpot gave Soul Reaver 2 a score of 8.8 and called it an excellent sequel, again praising the change to elemental puzzles and the combat system, but criticizing the dearth of sidequests and boss fights, and the lack of definite resolution to the storyline. Electronic Gaming Monthly's reviewer said that it triumphed as an aesthetic showcase, but deemed its gameplay mediocre and unappealing. The reviewer for Game Informer regarded Soul Reaver 2 as "quite engrossing". Star Dingo of GamePro similarly praised its graphics, sound design and voice acting, but condemned missed creative opportunities concerning the potential of the spectral realm and time travel, saying that the game "takes as many steps back as it does forward, and ends up teetering precariously over the brink of being a disappointment". The review concurred with IGN that the plot and dialogue, though entertaining, sometimes bordered on pretentiousness, and Game Revolution's Duke Ferris repeatedly compared the story to a soap opera.

Other critics, such as GameZone's Michael Lafferty, were less reserved in their praise of the narrative - The Electric Playground referred to it as "a textbook example to other console developers on how to write videogame prose" - but agreed that its complex and involved backstory could alienate some players. Journalists also commonly cited Soul Reaver 2's poor lifespan and replayability as an issue; the reviewer for Official U.S. PlayStation Magazine opined that "the problem is that there just isn't much gameplay there" and Fielder warned that play "burns bright, but not as long as you'd like".

Jim Preston reviewed the PlayStation 2 version of the game for Next Generation, rating it four stars out of five, and stated that "Perhaps a little too rococo for our tastes, Soul Reaver 2 is nonetheless an absorbing and expertly crafted game." The game won GameSpot's annual "Best Sound" award among console games. and it was nominated for NAVGTR Award for Outstanding Art Direction in a Game Cinema and Best Writing of the Year nomination but lost to Final Fantasy X and Half-Life respectively.
