= Legacy of Kain =

Action-adventure video game series

- The series logo as of Legacy of Kain: Defiance
- Genre: Action-adventure
- Developers: Silicon Knights (1996–97); Crystal Dynamics (1999–2003); Aspyr (2024)
- Publishers: Crystal Dynamics (1996–97); Eidos Interactive (1999–2003); Aspyr (2024)
- Creator: Denis Dyack
- Platforms: Dreamcast; Evercade; GameCube; Microsoft Windows; Nintendo Switch; Nintendo Switch 2 PlayStation; PlayStation 2 PlayStation 4 PlayStation 5 Xbox; Xbox One; Xbox Series X/S
- First release: Blood Omen: Legacy of Kain; November 1, 1996
- Latest release: Legacy of Kain: Ascendance; March 31, 2026

Legacy of Kain is a series of dark fantasy action-adventure video games primarily developed by Crystal Dynamics and formerly published by Eidos Interactive. The first title, Blood Omen: Legacy of Kain, was created by Silicon Knights in association with Crystal Dynamics, but, after a legal battle, Crystal Dynamics retained the rights to the game's intellectual property, and continued its story with four sequels. To date, five games comprise the series, all initially developed for video game consoles and later ported to Microsoft Windows. Focusing on the eponymous character of Kain, a vampire antihero, each title features action, exploration and puzzle-solving, with some role-playing game elements.

The series takes place in the fictional land of Nosgoth—a gothic fantasy setting—and revolves around Kain's quest to defy his fate and restore balance to the world. Legacy of Kain: Soul Reaver introduced another antihero protagonist, Raziel; the adventures of both characters culminate in Legacy of Kain: Defiance. Themes of destiny, free will, morality, redemption and the hero's journey recur in the storyline, which was inspired by ancient literature, horror fiction, Islamic art and culture, Shakespeare's plays, Jewish mysticism and gnosticism. The Legacy of Kain games have enjoyed critical success, particularly receiving praise for high-quality voice acting, narrative, and visuals, and, as a whole, had sold over 3.5 million copies by 2007. In 2022, Square Enix sold the rights of the series to the Embracer Group, who have expressed interest in developing sequels, remakes and remasters of Legacy of Kain.

Remastered versions of Legacy of Kain: Soul Reaver and Soul Reaver 2 were released for the Nintendo Switch, PlayStation 4, PlayStation 5, Windows, Xbox One and Xbox Series X/S in 2024. A remastered version of Legacy of Kain: Defiance was released in 2026.

== Games ==
Release Timeline
1996	Blood Omen: Legacy of Kain
1997–1998
1999	Legacy of Kain: Soul Reaver
2000
2001	Soul Reaver 2
2002	Blood Omen 2
2003	Legacy of Kain: Defiance
2004–2023
2024	Legacy of Kain: Soul Reaver 1 & 2 Remastered
2025	Nosgoth
2026	Legacy of Kain: Defiance Remastered
2026	Legacy of Kain: Ascendance

Series director Amy Hennig described the Pillars of Nosgoth (above: in concept art, center: in Blood Omen, below: in Defiance) as "the mythological and geographical hub" of the five games.

=== Blood Omen: Legacy of Kain ===
Blood Omen: Legacy of Kain was created by Silicon Knights under the direction of Denis Dyack, with assistance from publisher Crystal Dynamics, and was released in 1996 on the PlayStation. In 1997, it was ported to Microsoft Windows. Dyack conceived the "vampire project" under the title The Pillars of Nosgoth in 1993, and Crystal Dynamics producer Lyle Hall chose this fantasy concept over two other proposals (one of which was Too Human). Pursued in hopes of bringing a strong narrative and artistic cinema to consoles, it was built as "a game which adults would want to play", featuring an unconventional hero and gameplay that demanded thought as well as reflexes. Developed as a 2D action-adventure game with role-playing game elements, it debuted to positive critical and commercial reception. Selling points included its 50+ hour length and the wide array of items and abilities the player character commands. Blood Omen introduces Nosgoth, a fictional land designed with novel-like complexity, and gives the player control of Kain, a newly resurrected vampire seeking revenge against his murderers and a cure for his vampiric curse.

=== Legacy of Kain: Soul Reaver ===
Legacy of Kain: Soul Reaver was released in 1999 for the PlayStation and Microsoft Windows, and was ported to the Dreamcast in 2000. It originated as an independent concept inspired by Biblical themes called Shifter, devised by Crystal Dynamics' Amy Hennig and Seth Carus, but, at the request of company executives, was integrated into the Legacy of Kain universe in pre-production. Hennig, the game's director, likened the technological advance from Blood Omen to Soul Reaver to the evolution of The Legend of Zelda series from the Super Nintendo to the Nintendo 64—bringing the franchise into 3D while maintaining a similar style. Soul Reaver was hailed as a technical achievement for its plane-shifting gameplay mechanics and its data-streaming game engine, which eliminated the loading pauses that were prevalent in PlayStation-era games. It was a commercial and critical success, selling 1.5 million units worldwide, but the strong reactions of players to its cliffhanger ending impelled the developers to allay concerns that it was released unfinished. The game elaborates on one of the two endings to Blood Omen, taking place in Nosgoth's dark future where Kain rules an empire of vampires, and introduces a new protagonist, his lieutenant Raziel, who is executed by Kain and resurrected to exact revenge on his brethren and his master.

=== Soul Reaver 2 ===
Soul Reaver 2 had an accelerated development cycle and was released after two years, despite a switch to sixth generation consoles early in the project. It was initially targeted for release in late 2000 on the PlayStation and Dreamcast, but was reworked and released in 2001 as a PlayStation 2 exclusive, and was ported to Microsoft Windows later that year. The developers' goal was to retain the elements that made its predecessor successful, but they decided to eschew the "complete a level, fight a boss" flow of the previous game in favor of a more narrative-driven approach. The plot serves as a direct sequel to Soul Reaver, picking up immediately after its ending. The player controls Raziel as he uncovers the mysteries surrounding Nosgoth's distant past and his own destiny. Meanwhile, Kain attempts to subvert fate and restore the world by manipulating history. While Soul Reaver was still in development, Crystal Dynamics initiated another project - a successor to Blood Omen - and when the Soul Reaver team had started work on their follow-up in late 1999, two Legacy of Kain games were in simultaneous development.

=== Blood Omen 2 ===
Blood Omen 2's "creative seeds were sown" in 1999, and the finished product was released in 2002, six months after Soul Reaver 2, for the PlayStation 2, Xbox, Microsoft Windows and GameCube. It was not produced with the involvement of the Soul Reaver crew, instead being created by a new team at Crystal Dynamics under the direction of Glen Schofield. A key point of focus for the developers was the main character, Kain; Crystal Dynamics had "a huge investment in Kain as a character". Shifting the focus of gameplay towards action, gore and combat instead of puzzle-solving, it retains several of the qualities which made the previous games popular, but was criticized for lacking innovation. Despite middling critical reception, it was released on four platforms and sold well. The setting, an enormous industrial city, is a departure for the series. While the game was released after Soul Reaver 2, the events of the game actually happen after Blood Omen but before the events of Soul Reaver, in an alternate timeline created from the Soul Reaver 2 events. In Blood Omen 2 players control a younger Kain after an unsuccessful campaign to conquer Nosgoth, as he is opposed by traitorous vampires and a new enemy.

=== Legacy of Kain: Defiance ===
Legacy of Kain: Defiance was released in 2003 on the PlayStation 2, Xbox and Microsoft Windows. First conceptualized as Soul Reaver 3, it represented a combined effort from the Soul Reaver 2 and Blood Omen 2 teams to consolidate and re-balance the storytelling, puzzle-solving and combat aspects of its predecessors, fusing elements from the two sub-series into one game. They chose a new title under the Legacy of Kain banner to reflect this new focus. The player alternates between control of Raziel and the Soul Reaver 2 incarnation of Kain in each of the game's chapters, under the premise that only one of the two will survive—emphasis was placed on cinematic presentation. The story concludes on a hopeful note, but without full resolution; during production, Hennig departed Crystal Dynamics to work for Naughty Dog, and Defiance did not meet Eidos' sales expectations. Following its release, Eidos placed the series on hold. Former Eidos North America CEO Bill Gardner and Eidos Life President Ian Livingstone expressed interest in reviving the franchise, but Crystal Dynamics stated that they were not working on a continuation.

=== Nosgoth ===
Nosgoth, a multiplayer game, was formally announced by Square Enix London Studios community manager George Kelion to be in development in June 2013, in response to a series of internet leaks and resultant speculation. According to Kelion, it was to be set in the same universe as previous Legacy of Kain titles, but would not be "a traditional or even single-player LoK experience". The game was intended to be viewed as "very much on a separate branch to both the Soul Reaver and Blood Omen series", and Crystal Dynamics were not involved in its development. Kelion stated that Nosgoth would be more formally announced and revealed at a future date, sometime beyond the Electronic Entertainment Expo 2013. Nosgoth however was never officially released, but began open beta in January 2015. The game officially shut down its servers on May 31, 2016.

=== Soul Reaver 1 & 2 Remastered ===
Legacy of Kain: Soul Reaver 1 & 2 Remastered is a video game compilation released in 2024, developed and published by Aspyr that comprises the second and third games in the series. The remastered collection includes new features such as toggleable high-fidelity graphics, a modern control scheme, improved camera controls, a map and compass, "lost levels", a photo mode, and a day and night cycle which was cut from the original Soul Reaver. The release of Soul Reaver 1 & 2 Remastered coincided with the 25th anniversary of 1999's Legacy of Kain: Soul Reaver. The game had a development philosophy similar to that of Aspyr's Tomb Raider I–III Remastered, and built upon the games' original source code and engine, provided to the team by Crystal Dynamics.

=== Defiance Remastered ===
A remaster of the fifth installment, Legacy of Kain: Defiance Remastered, was released in 2026, on the same platforms as the Soul Reaver 1 & 2 Remastered.

=== Legacy of Kain: Ascendance ===
Legacy of Kain: Ascendance is a 2D platformer and was released on March 31, 2026. The game was not released on eighth generation consoles. It is described as a retro action platformer and features new voice recordings by Michael Bell, Simon Templeman, Richard Doyle and Anna Gunn.

Ascendance received almost exclusively mixed to negative reviews. Beyond gameplay and story criticism, concerns about how Ascendance retcons key points of the lore were also mentioned.

=== Cancelled games ===
==== Legacy of Kain: The Dark Prophecy ====
In 2008, it emerged that a sixth game, Legacy of Kain: The Dark Prophecy, had briefly been in development at Ritual Entertainment in 2004 before being cancelled. A playable demo of Dark Prophecy, sourced from an old milestone build, is available on the Deluxe Edition of Legacy of Kain: Defiance Remastered.

==== Legacy of Kain: Dead Sun ====
In 2013, Square Enix confirmed allegations that Climax Studios had worked on another new Legacy of Kain title for the PlayStation 4, Legacy of Kain: Dead Sun, until this project's cancellation in 2012.

== Overview ==
=== Common elements ===
The Legacy of Kain games fall into the action-adventure genre, utilizing a balance of action, puzzle-solving and exploration. Starting from Soul Reaver, the series also features platforming elements from a 3D, third-person perspective. Whereas Blood Omen and Soul Reaver employ an open world system in the style of The Legend of Zelda or Super Mario 64, the latter three games are divided into chapters, and are more linear in progression. As the player solves pivotal puzzles or defeats bosses, they receive new weapons and abilities, such as telekinesis, shapeshifting, mind control and magical spells. The main character's health constantly declines in each game—Kain must consume blood to sustain his strength, whereas Raziel requires souls—prompting combat, which focuses on hack and slash techniques, and allows the player to kill and feed from enemies.

Blood Omen 2 and Defiance include experience point systems, and in the Soul Reaver games and Defiance, the player must shift between the material and spectral planes of existence to progress – both realms have unique physical laws, geometry and enemies. The Soul Reaver sword, a recurring ultimate weapon and soul-devouring blade inhabited by a ravenous entity, appears in all five titles. Dialogue in the series is florid and Elizabethan in style, inspired by period pieces such as Becket, The Lion in Winter and A Man for All Seasons, and each game was scripted in the manner of a stage play, with monologues, asides and cutscenes interspersing gameplay. During Blood Omen's production, Silicon Knights hired classically trained actors to deliver voice talent, a precedent which Crystal Dynamics continued in successive games.

Simon Templeman and Michael Bell voice protagonists Kain and Raziel respectively. Supporting cast members include Paul Lukather as Vorador, Anna Gunn as Ariel, Richard Doyle as Moebius, and René Auberjonois as Janos Audron. Tony Jay played Mortanius in Blood Omen, and returned as The Elder God in subsequent games; in Defiance, Mortanius was recast as Alastair Duncan. Gordon Hunt and Kris Zimmerman provided voice direction from Soul Reaver and onward. The developers coordinated the actors by ensuring they were involved as collaborators, recording their dialogue together rather than in isolation, and thus established techniques which would later carry over to Naughty Dog's Uncharted series.

=== Story ===
Raziel (left) and Kain (right) as they appear in Legacy of Kain: Defiance. Both are armed with the Soul Reaver sword.

The health of the land of Nosgoth is inextricably tied to nine edifices known as the Pillars of Nosgoth. The Pillars are preserved by an oligarchy of sorcerers known as the Circle of Nine, each of whom serves as the guardian of an individual Pillar. When a guardian dies, a new one is born to take their place. In the prologue of Blood Omen, Ariel, the guardian of balance, is killed, and the resulting chain of events leads to the spiritual corruption of the Pillars and their guardians. Thirty years later, Kain, a young nobleman, is murdered by brigands, and resurrected as a vampire by a necromancer, Mortanius. Directed by Mortanius and the specter of Ariel, he tracks down and kills the guardians in hopes of attaining revenge and a cure to his vampirism, but slowly begins to embrace his new powers. While hunting Moebius, the guardian of time, he defies the advice of Vorador (a senior vampire), and travels back in time. Using the Soul Reaver, he prevents a tyrant king from coming to power, but the temporal paradox which this causes results in a new timeline where Nosgoth's humans have hunted the vampires to extinction. Kain discovers that Mortanius — the guardian of death —orchestrated his murder to purge the Circle and kills all but one of the remaining guardians. Kain realizes that he himself is the final corrupt guardian, born as Ariel's successor, and is left to decide between sacrificing himself to restore the world (but destroying the vampire race), or ruling Nosgoth in its damnation. Soul Reaver establishes that Kain, disgusted by the humans' machinations, chose the latter option and embraced vampirism as a blessing. He raised a cadre of vampire lieutenants to conquer Nosgoth's human kingdoms, establishing an all-powerful empire under his control while the land decays.

1500 years after the events of Blood Omen, Raziel, his first-born follower, transgresses against Kain, and is consequently executed. A demiurge-like entity known as The Elder God resurrects Raziel, who quickly confronts Kain. Kain strikes Raziel with the Reaver, but it shatters against him, and the captive spirit formerly within the blade binds itself to Raziel's arm. Raziel murders his lieutenant brethren, and discovers that Kain resurrected them all from the corpses of the Sarafan, an ancient vampire-hunting spiritual brotherhood. Infuriated at this revelation, he pursues Kain to Moebius's long-abandoned time machine, and Kain lures him into the past. In Soul Reaver 2, Raziel conspires with Moebius to destroy Kain, but—after realizing that Kain wishes to restore the Pillars, and learning that Moebius secretly serves The Elder God—his lust for vengeance is tempered by a higher quest for enlightenment and freedom from the ensnarement of predestination. On advice from Vorador, he seeks Janos Audron, an infamous, long-dead vampire who holds the key to his destiny. Raziel assists Kain in triggering another paradox which changes Kain's fate, prolonging his life, and travels Nosgoth's history. Beginning to unearth the secrets of his past, he briefly meets with Janos in the era of the Sarafan, but realizes that his own, human former self murdered the ancient vampire. He slaughters the Sarafan lieutenants, and murders his former self, becoming the catalyst of Kain's future empire and his own history. In a final epiphany, he discovers that he is the ravenous spirit destined to become imprisoned in the Reaver—that the cycle of his destiny will never end. At the last minute, Kain saves Raziel from this fate and takes the empty Reaver, but the paradox that this causes changes history for the worse.

Soul Reaver 2, Blood Omen 2 and Defiance expand the backstory of the series. Initially, alongside the humans, two other major races existed in Nosgoth's distant past: the ancient vampires and the Hylden. The Vampires exalted the spiritual and the wheel of fate, whereas the Hylden were technologically inclined beings. Though the vampires worshiped The Elder God, the Hylden rejected his doctrine, and the vampires declared war in response to this blasphemy. Using incredible magic, the vampires erected the Pillars, banishing the Hylden into another dimension, and forged the Reaver as a safeguard. The Hylden retaliated by afflicting the vampires with a blood curse, which transformed them into immortal, sterile predators of humankind. Divorced from the wheel of fate and their god, many vampires turned to suicide, and as their race died out, the humans of Nosgoth seized control of the Pillars. Over the centuries, the Hylden strained against the barriers of their prison, seeking to topple the Pillars. Kain's spiritual corruption hinders him from realizing his role as the balance guardian—he seeks to somehow resolve the dilemma he faced at the end of Blood Omen by both restoring the Pillars and returning them to vampire rule. Raziel's execution was necessitated—his unique, cyclic destiny affords him free will, enabling Kain to create paradoxes and defy history. Blood Omen 2 pursues a younger Kain in the altered timeline created at the end of Soul Reaver 2, depicting his war against the leader of the Hylden. Eventually, Kain kills The Hylden Lord, and departs, to eventually establish his empire from Soul Reaver.

Defiance covers earlier points in the same timeline, directly after Soul Reaver 2. Kain and Raziel each discover evidence that the ancient vampires and Hylden had prophesied two champions—one representing each race—who would decide the fate of Nosgoth. Whereas Raziel is bent on resurrecting Janos to escape his destiny, Kain strives to stop him, and the two are drawn into battle. Raziel learns from Mortanius that Kain was raised using Janos' heart, and rips this from Kain's chest in their last battle, ostensibly killing his former master. Though disillusioned, Raziel resurrects Janos, who guides him to a final trial. Though he succeeds, receiving spiritual powers, Raziel witnesses the collapse of the Pillars. The resulting breach enables The Hylden Lord to possess Janos (facilitating his invasion in Blood Omen 2), and Raziel is defeated in the ensuing battle, trapped by The Elder God. He concludes that the Elder, sustained by the souls of Nosgoth, is the ultimate cause of all the conflict and strife throughout history, and realizes that he, himself, was both the Vampiric and Hylden champions; Kain was neither. His free will, and his destiny to enter the Reaver (consuming himself), ensures that neither champion can win. Later, Kain miraculously awakes, despite the loss of his heart. He encounters Raziel, and they reconcile; Raziel enters the Reaver willingly, but first uses his spiritual powers to cleanse Kain of the corruption he had inherited at birth as a member of the Circle of Nine. Thus healed, Kain is able to perceive The Elder God for the first time. They skirmish briefly, and Kain wounds the Elder with the Reaver, but is unable to destroy him. As he looks out over Nosgoth, Kain contemplates Raziel's sacrifice, and the first bitter taste of hope it has given him.

=== Themes ===
Each of the Legacy of Kain games concerns distinct themes and dilemmas, but their overarching philosophical topic involves fatalism and man's struggle for free will. Blood Omen was intended to ask "what is evil? Perhaps it is merely a perspective", and to "address morals, evil and good, propaganda and fate in ways that have never been explored in a computer game before". Other latent issues included trust, manipulation and betrayal, which carried over into Crystal Dynamics' sequels. In Soul Reaver and Soul Reaver 2, Amy Hennig identified "the question of free will in a universe apparently ruled by fate" as the core of the story. Gnosticism, in which "the material world is an illusion, a lie perpetrated by a false and malignant god whose aim is to keep the human soul in darkness and ignorance" and the hero's goal is "knowledge, enlightenment, and the exposure of the truth", helped to formulate Raziel's arc. Themes of despair, hope and illumination in the works of T. S. Eliot and James Joyce influenced the story.

The developers also attempted to subvert the monomyth and other tropes within literature and gaming. Silicon Knights conceptualized Kain, a vampire antihero inspired by Clint Eastwood's Unforgiven, as an atypical "gray" protagonist, neither good nor evil, despite being advised in 1993 that such a character would not appeal to gamers. Similarly, Hennig developed Raziel as a "self-righteous little twit" with villainy, seeking redemption and transcendence through knowledge, in contrast to an idealistic hero. Drawing from Joseph Campbell's ideas, she felt it would be interesting to see how players interpret morality in this context, and argued that "the only way a hero can ever succeed is by following his own path. As long as he's following a path laid out by someone else, ultimately he's going to fail". Defiance portrayed Kain and Raziel as Sophoclean Oedipus-like figures, "being railroaded by fate". Hennig said that "they are heroes because they refuse to submit, even when all the odds are stacked against them".

== Development ==
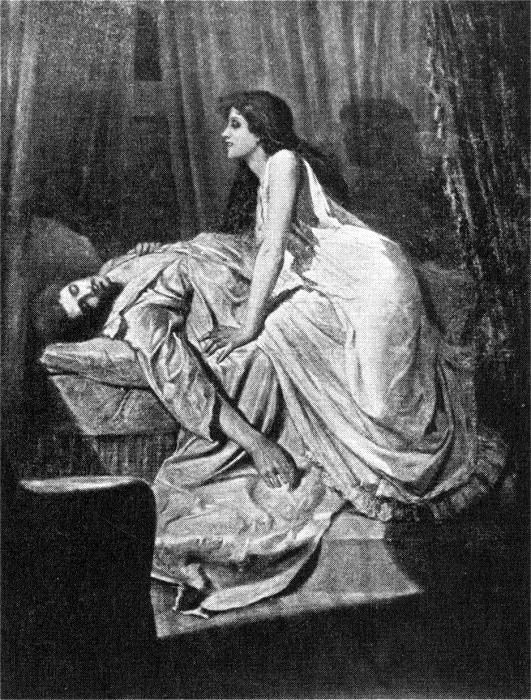
Vampire mythology was a central source behind the production of the series, as were gnosticism, ancient literature and Joseph Campbell's works.

During and after the completion of Dark Legions, Silicon Knights spent several months working on the design of Blood Omen without a particular platform in mind. Major inspirations behind the project included The Wheel of Time, Necroscope and Shakespeare's plays, while the concept of the Pillars of Nosgoth was derived from cover art for The Pillars of the Earth. Crystal Dynamics agreed to publish the game in 1993, and although there was indecision as to whether it should be produced for the 3DO Interactive Multiplayer or the Sega Saturn, both parties settled on the PlayStation once Sony announced its impending launch. The game took over three years to develop, undergoing a substantial expansion mid-process which required Silicon Knights to increase its workforce—Crystal Dynamics sent several staff to assist them, including Amy Hennig and Seth Carus. Following "Herculean efforts", Blood Omen was released in late 1996. After its success, Silicon Knights contemplated creating a sequel in what they described as the Blood Omen series, but their relationship with Crystal Dynamics dissolved in 1997. Crystal Dynamics began developing Soul Reaver internally, and were acquired by Eidos Interactive during its production.

In 1998, Silicon Knights filed a suit against Crystal Dynamics for rights to the Legacy of Kain IP, requesting an injunction to prevent Crystal Dynamics from marketing the sequel. The two studios settled their legal dispute privately, and Crystal Dynamics and Eidos retained rights to the Legacy of Kain franchise, provided that Soul Reaver acknowledge Silicon Knights as the series' original creator. Paradise Lost was the original inspiration behind the concept, and sources such as Rabbinic lore, vampire mythology, Eastern myth and mysticism were also key influences. Visual cues were borrowed from films such as The City of Lost Children and The Cabinet of Dr. Caligari, and H. P. Lovecraft's Cthulhu Mythos. Soul Reaver was highly anticipated despite several delays, and was promoted on the covers of over ten game industry magazines, but schedule pressures forced Crystal Dynamics to cut content from the ending sequence. They intended to integrate the removed material into the sequel. Soul Reaver 2 was inspired by time travel fiction and Kurt Rudolph's research into Gnosticism. It was slated to include more of Blood Omen's role-playing game aspects and a wider breadth of acquirable abilities, though the team was handicapped by the release of the PlayStation 2.

The Soul Reaver 2 project was produced for the PlayStation for a short time, but, after creating a proof-of-concept demo, the developers were given approval to scrap their work and switch to the newer console. With "remarkable dedication, and sickening hours", the game was developed in 17 months; as with Soul Reaver, several features were cut in order to meet the release deadline. Blood Omen 2 was concurrently developed by an independent Crystal Dynamics team with creative autonomy, extrapolating from the 19th century steampunk aesthetic of Soul Reaver to settle on a Victorian feel. Its crew was wary of relying too strongly on the original Blood Omen as an influence, and expanded on the franchise's backstory in hopes of starting a new series, but inconsistencies raised by its plot left the Soul Reaver 2 team to reconcile the storyline in the next game. Defiance represented "a whole new approach" to the franchise, with more focus on drama, an overhauled combat system, and scripted, cinematic camera angles.

== Other media ==
Music from both Soul Reaver and Soul Reaver 2 was released on a promotional soundtrack in 2001. For Soul Reaver, Amy Hennig selected Kurt Harland of synthpop band Information Society to compose the score. According to Harland, a colleague introduced the Soul Reaver team to his work through "Ozar Midrashim", a track from Information Society's 1997 album Don't Be Afraid. This track went on to feature in Soul Reaver as the opening theme. Harland worked with audio engineer Jim Hedges in the creation of an adaptive audio system for Soul Reaver which allowed the music to change based on in-game context. This approach became a mainstay of subsequent games in the series.

Following the release of Soul Reaver, action figures of the characters Kain and Raziel were created by Blue Box Interactive and the National Entertainment Collectibles Association in partnership with Eidos. A single-issue promotional comic by Top Cow Productions was released in October 1999 to promote the release of Soul Reaver, starring the vampire Raziel and serving as a prequel to the game's events. Top Cow collaborated with Crystal Dynamics to produce a second comic in early 2004, recapitulating the series' backstory, to coincide with the release of Defiance. Both Kain and Raziel also feature as playable characters in downloadable content for 2010's Lara Croft and the Guardian of Light.

A graphic novel titled Legacy of Kain: Soul Reaver – The Dead Shall Rise was released in 2025, written by Joshua Viola and Angie Hodapp, and published by Bit Bot Media. The novel serves as a prequel to Legacy of Kain: Soul Reaver and tells Raziel's human past as a Sarafan warrior and reveals how he came to be a vampire serving under Kain.

== Reception ==
Aggregate review scores
Game	Metacritic
Blood Omen: Legacy of Kain	(PC) 82% (Note: GameRankings score) (PS) 83%
Legacy of Kain: Soul Reaver	(DC) 88% (PC) 78% (PS) 91/100
Soul Reaver 2	(PC) 77/100 (PS2) 80/100
Blood Omen 2	(GC) 71/100 (PC) 66/100 (PS2) 67/100 (Xbox) 76/100
Legacy of Kain: Defiance	(PC) 70/100 (PS2) 75/100 (Xbox) 74/100

By 2007, the Legacy of Kain series had collectively sold over 3.5 million copies, but its commercial success has varied with each game. Blood Omen surpassed Crystal Dynamics' expectations, with reported sales figures ranging from 320,082 units to 2 million copies, whereas Soul Reaver sold over 1.5 million copies, and was included on Sony's "Greatest Hits" list. Soul Reaver 2 and Blood Omen 2 also performed well, selling in excess of 500,000 copies each and becoming Greatest Hits titles. Defiance sold between 500,000 and 1 million units, but failed to live up to Eidos's sales targets.

Legacy of Kain has been cited as one of the most popular video game intellectual properties associated with vampires. IGN's Douglass C. Perry regarded the series as "a strangely attractive, yet equally obscure one that [had him] torn between loving and hating it". GameSpot's Greg Kasavin was critical of Blood Omen 2, but praised the Soul Reaver games as "great" for their "innovation and surprising drama", voice acting and technical feats. Matt Clemens of Computer and Video Games said that the series had engaging narrative, impressive cinematic sequences and fluid combat, calling Soul Reaver an "absolute classic". The Houston Press described Legacy of Kain's voice cast as "the greatest unrecognized brilliance in video game acting", and compared the dialogue of the series to plays by William Shakespeare. Mikel Reparaz of GamesRadar said that "known for nuanced storytelling, unconventional protagonists, amazing boss fights and rich Shakespearean baritones, the series raised the bar for writing and acting in games". GameSpy's Chuck Osborn complimented the games' storyline as "deep", but described their mythology as convoluted.

Individually, each title has generally been received well by critics. Metacritic, a video game review aggregator website, determined that the PlayStation version of Soul Reaver received a "critical acclaim" score of 91/100, Soul Reaver 2 received "generally favorable" scores of 80/100 and 77/100 for PlayStation 2 and Microsoft Windows, the Xbox version of Blood Omen 2 received a "generally favorable" score of 76/100 while the GameCube, PlayStation 2 and Microsoft Windows versions received "mixed or average" scores of 71/100, 67/100 and 66/100, and the PlayStation 2 version of Defiance received a "generally favorable" score of 75/100 while the Xbox and Microsoft Windows versions received "mixed or average" scores of 74/100 and 70/100. Soul Reaver was also Amy Hennig's self-proclaimed greatest achievement. Later games in the series were criticized for repetitive gameplay elements and review scores of subsequent titles trended downward.

== Legacy ==
In an October 2015 interview, Crystal Dynamics' senior designer, Michael Brinker, replied that there was "a 50/50 chance" of a sixth Legacy of Kain single player game releasing during the eighth generation of video game consoles. The IP was also mentioned under Square Enix Collective.

In May 2022, Embracer Group acquired the Legacy of Kain intellectual property alongside other assets of Square Enix Europe, including the development studio Crystal Dynamics for $300 million. Embracer Group expressed interest in sequels, remakes and remasters of the Legacy of Kain franchise among others. That November, Embracer, after sending a survey in October to gauge fan interest in the IP, said during an earnings call that they received more than 100,000 responses and hear the fans "loud and clear".

Two Legacy of Kain collections were released in 2024: Legacy of Kain: Soul Reaver 1 & 2 Remastered in December for multiple platforms, and Legacy of Kain Collection for Evercade retro gaming devices in September, which includes Blood Omen: Legacy of Kain and Legacy of Kain: Soul Reaver.
