= Legacy of Kain: Soul Reaver =

1999 video game

- Cover art featuring the main protagonist Raziel.
- Developer: Crystal Dynamics (Note: Ported to Dreamcast by Nixxes Software)
- Publisher: Eidos Interactive
- Director: Amy Hennig
- Producers: Andrew Bennett; Amy Hennig; Rosaura Sandoval
- Designers: Amy Hennig; Seth Carus; Richard Lemarchand
- Programmers: Carl Stika; Marc David
- Artist: Arnold Ayala
- Writers: Amy Hennig; Richard Lemarchand; Jim Curry
- Composer: Kurt Harland
- Series: Legacy of Kain
- Platforms: PlayStation; Windows; Dreamcast
- Release: PlayStation: NA: August 16, 1999; UK: September 3, 1999; Windows: NA: September 10, 1999; UK: September 18, 1999; Dreamcast: NA: January 25, 2000; UK: February 25, 2000
- Genre: Action-adventure
- Mode: Single-player

Legacy of Kain: Soul Reaver is a 1999 action-adventure video game developed by Crystal Dynamics and published by Eidos Interactive for the PlayStation and Windows. A port to the Dreamcast developed by Nixxes Software was released in 2000, serving as Nixxes' first project. The second game in the Legacy of Kain series, Soul Reaver is the sequel to Blood Omen: Legacy of Kain. Soul Reaver was followed by three games, one of which, Soul Reaver 2, is a direct sequel.

Taking place 1500 years after the events of Blood Omen, Soul Reaver chronicles the journey of the vampire-turned-wraith Raziel, lieutenant to the vampire lord Kain. Raziel is killed by Kain, but is revived by The Elder God to become his "soul reaver" and to exact revenge. Raziel shares this title with Kain's sword, the Soul Reaver, which he acquires during the game.

Crystal Dynamics began development of the game in 1997, but a deteriorating relationship with Silicon Knights, who had developed Blood Omen, created legal problems. This and other delays forced material originally planned for Soul Reaver to be instead released with later games of the series. Soul Reaver gained critical acclaim. Critics praised it for its intriguing gothic story and high-quality graphics. However, the game was criticized for its simple and repetitive gameplay and an unsatisfying climax. By 2001, the game sold 1.5 million copies worldwide.

A remastered version of Soul Reaver and its sequel were released on December 10, 2024, as Legacy of Kain: Soul Reaver 1 & 2 Remastered.

== Gameplay ==
The player controls Raziel, a disfigured and ghostly vampire. The game is normally shown from a third-person perspective behind Raziel, but players can rotate the viewpoint around him. Gameplay relies largely on shifting between the material and spectral planes of existence to progress through areas. Although interaction with objects is limited in the spectral realm, this can be advantageous, because Raziel can phase through otherwise impassable gates there, and water is insubstantial, allowing him to walk on lakebeds; however, blocks, doors, and switches can be manipulated only in the physical realm. Many puzzles are based on the differences between the two realms; for example, platforms and environment features in one realm may change form to open new paths in the other. Block puzzles are also common and require the rotation, flipping, and moving of large blocks to progress, often with a time limit and while avoiding enemies.

The player can cause Raziel to shift between planes of existence, which have similar layouts but different aesthetics. Shown is the same location, a human town, in the material (top) and spectral (bottom) realms.

Combat in Soul Reaver is a hack and slash system, involving the use of combinations of various different attacks before a finishing move. Raziel's enemies are grouped into humans, spectral creatures, and most commonly, vampires. Human enemies include peasants, vampire hunters and vampire worshippers. In the spectral realm, players fight minor enemies called Sluagh and the souls of dead vampires who have become wraiths. Each brood of vampire enemies has unique powers reminiscent of their clan leader. Human and spectral enemies can be killed with Raziel's claws or any weapon, but vampires must be bludgeoned into a stunned state and then destroyed by impaling them, setting them on fire, or tossing them into a hazard such as sunlight or water. When killed, enemies leave behind souls that replenish Raziel's health, which automatically decreases in the material realm and increases in the spectral. Possession of the Soul Reaver sword stops automatic degeneration of health in the physical realm, but Raziel loses the sword instantly if he sustains damage and can regain it only by restoring his health to full.

At first, Raziel can jump, glide using his torn wings, move blocks, and pick up and throw objects and enemies. Initially unarmed, he fights using his claws, but can alternatively use weapons such as rocks, torches, spears and staffs, and the Soul Reaver. Raziel can freely shift to the spectral realm, but can return to the material realm only through special portals when at full health. Raziel automatically shifts to the spectral realm if he runs out of health. As the game progresses, Raziel gains the powers of his clan brothers after defeating them and becomes able to phase through gates in the spectral realm and climb walls in the material realm. Initially vulnerable to water, he overcomes this weakness and learns to swim. He also gains the ability to constrict objects and enemies with a band of energy, although this feature was one of the few abilities not to feature in future games. Players can find an ancient relic that gives Raziel the power to fire bolts of telekinetic energy, which cause little damage by themselves but can knock enemies into hazards and push objects from a distance. Baptism in holy flame can transform the Soul Reaver into the Fire Reaver, which can set enemies aflame and adds fire to Raziel's telekinetic bolts. Players can also find magical glyphs that allow Raziel to expend magical energy to attack groups of enemies simultaneously. These glyphs typically involve vampire weaknesses such as sunlight, fire, water, or sound, as well as additions such as telekinetic force (available well before the normal telekinesis becomes available) and the causing of earthquakes to temporarily stun enemies. Glyphs are acquired through finding glyph altars, specific locations in Nosgoth where the skills can be learned, and solving a puzzle before being granted the magical ability. However, Raziel begins the game with access to the 'Shift' glyph, granting the ability to shift between the material and spectral planes, with no glyph altar necessary.

== Plot ==
=== Setting ===
Soul Reaver takes place within the fictional world of Nosgoth, where the health of the land is tied to the nine Pillars of Nosgoth, and each pillar in turn is represented by a guardian. Before the events of Soul Reaver, the guardians became corrupt, and, after Kain killed eight of them, he discovered he was the final one. Refusing to sacrifice himself to restore the Pillars, he doomed Nosgoth to eternal decay and proceeded to raise his vampire lieutenants, including Raziel, to besiege the land. By the time of Soul Reaver's introduction, the vampires are now the land's dominant species and apex predators, the humans have been decimated, and the vampire tribes have each claimed a region of Nosgoth and turned their attention to internal matters. Unknown to the vampires, beneath Nosgoth lurks The Elder God, an ancient and powerful entity. The Elder God controls the Wheel of Fate, a cycle of reincarnation of souls that circle the Wheel in a loop of predestination; however, because vampires are immortal, their souls do not spin with the Wheel, causing the land to decay as the Wheel stalls. By the time that Raziel is revived centuries after the game's opening cinematic, Nosgoth is on the brink of collapse, little more than a wasteland wracked with cataclysms and earthquakes.

=== Characters ===
The protagonist of Soul Reaver is the vampire-turned-wraith Raziel, whom Kain casts to death at the beginning of the game. Although Kain is the protagonist of the previous game, Blood Omen: Legacy of Kain, he is the primary antagonist and final boss of Soul Reaver. The Elder God resurrects and assists Raziel, explains the game's controls, and describes previous events in the story. Ariel, who preceded Kain as the guardian of the Pillar of Balance, appears as a spirit and offers Raziel advice on occasion. During his quest, Raziel meets his brothers - Melchiah, Zephon, Rahab and Dumah - who serve as the game's bosses. Each has developed different powers that Raziel partially gains by killing them and devouring their souls. A fifth brother, Turel, was omitted due to time constraints on development.

=== Story ===
Raziel approaches Kain's throne and extends newly grown wings. In an act of seeming jealousy, Kain tears the bones from Raziel's wings and has him thrown into the Lake of the Dead, a large natural whirlpool; however, Raziel is resurrected as a wraith by The Elder God to become his "soul reaver" and kill Kain, thus restoring Nosgoth. With The Elder God's guidance, Raziel adapts to his new form and returns to Nosgoth. Infiltrating a Necropolis inhabited by the Melchahim vampires, Raziel finds his brother Melchiah, who has devolved into a beast unable to sustain his own flesh. After Raziel kills Melchiah and absorbs his soul, he confronts Kain among the ruined Pillars of Nosgoth in the Sanctuary of the Clans. Kain does not appear surprised to see Raziel, apparently having even been expecting him, and implies that he has destroyed Raziel's vampire clan, which only enrages Raziel even further. When Raziel begins to criticize him, Kain simply launches a tirade against him before noting what has become of the empire and engaging him in combat. Kain quickly overpowers Raziel and attempts to strike him down with the Soul Reaver, a powerful sword that absorbs its victims' souls, but the Reaver shatters when it strikes Raziel, and Kain escapes, strangely satisfied. Raziel enters the spectral realm to find the blade's soul-devouring spectral form, which binds itself to him. After this, Raziel meets Ariel, who restores his strength, and learns of Zephon's location from The Elder God.

Raziel ventures into a large cathedral once inhabited by the humans and finds the Zephonim clan. After ascending into the cathedral's spires, he finds that Zephon is now a large insect like creature whose body has merged into the cathedral spire in which he dwells. Raziel kills Zephon and uses the gained power to infiltrate an ancient crypt. There, Raziel discovers coffins for members of the Sarafan, a fanatical order of vampire hunters killed centuries before Kain's rule. To Raziel's horror, he finds the crypt was designated for him and his brothers; as cruel irony, Kain revived the Sarafan to serve him as his vampire sons. Raziel ventures through a secret passage under the crypt and finds a flooded abbey inhabited by the Rahabim clan, whose members have mutated into amphibians; its leader, Rahab, has become a merman. Raziel tells Rahab what he has learned about their human pasts, but Rahab is unmoved, claiming that Kain "saved" them, and attacks. Raziel defeats Rahab and absorbs his soul, then crosses the Lake of the Dead to the abandoned fortress of his brother Dumah. The Elder God explains that the Dumahim vampires were scattered following an invasion of human hunters. Raziel eventually finds Dumah shackled to his throne with his heart pierced. Raziel revives Dumah and leads him into a giant furnace, burning him alive and absorbing his soul.

Afterward, Raziel discovers the Oracle's Cave, where Moebius the Time Streamer once hid the Chronoplast, a magical time machine. Raziel traverses the caves and finds Kain in the Chronoplast's control room. Raziel is angered over what he has learned but Kain says that his actions are justified due to being subject to destiny, and when Raziel confronts him over transforming the Sarafan into vampires, Kain scoffs at his perception of them as noble crusaders defending Nosgoth. Raziel attacks Kain while the latter continues to adjust the Chronoplast's controls. Although Raziel eventually gains an advantage, the Chronoplast activates, and Kain escapes through a time portal, beckoning Raziel to follow. Raziel complies, ignoring warnings from The Elder God. At the end of the game, Raziel emerges from the timeslip and is greeted by Moebius. Legacy of Kain: Soul Reaver ends on a cliffhanger by showing a postscript, a verse where Moebius comments on the nature of time and his ability to "plunge the fate of planets into chaos", leading directly into the events of Soul Reaver 2.

== Development ==
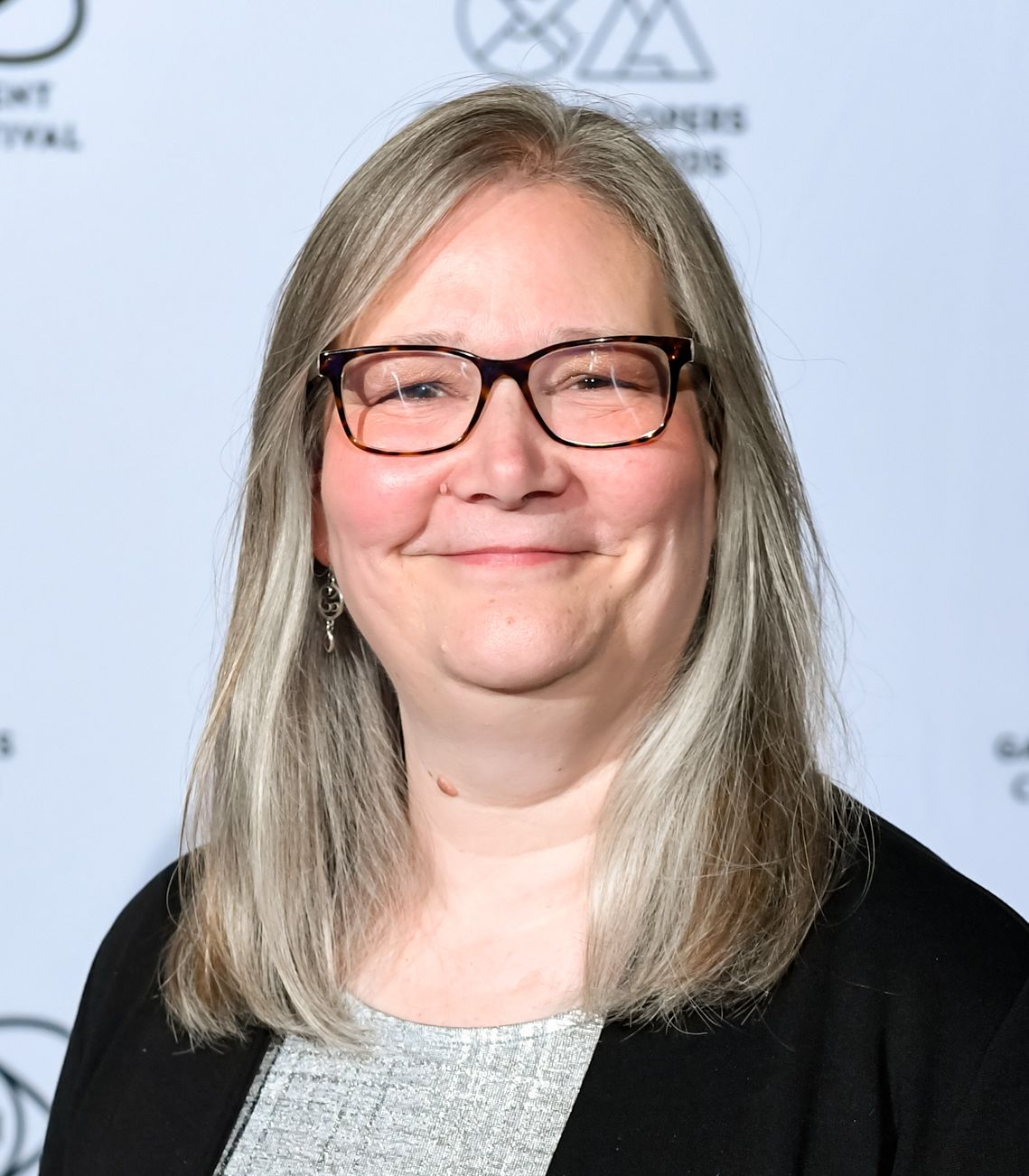
In addition to being a designer and writer for Soul Reaver, Amy Hennig (shown in 2019) served as the director.

Soul Reaver entered development alongside Blood Omen 2 in 1997 and focused on puzzle solving instead of Blood Omen 2's action. During design, the development team created larger areas that could be explored more thoroughly as Raziel acquired new powers, avoiding the "shallow[ness]" of Blood Omen's layout. Crystal Dynamics based Soul Reaver on Silicon Knights' research of vampire mythology for Blood Omen. Other aspects of the game, such as the idea of a fallen vampire who devoured souls, were inspired by the epic poem "Paradise Lost". According to senior designer Richard Lermarchand the "look and feel" of the game was inspired by "stylish vampire flicks...like Blade, Interview with the Vampire and Bram Stoker's Dracula", as well as "the more arty renderings of the old black and white Nosferatu and a great film for the 80s called Near Dark". Character and level designs were influenced by Islamic art and culture, anime and manga, including Vampire Hunter D and the films of Hayao Miyazaki.

The staff aimed to develop gameplay similar to Tomb Raider and used an upgraded version of Gex 3's game engine to generate the three-dimensional game world. The team developed its own streaming technology in order to minimize load times. According to Lemarchand, they also aimed to combine gameplay with storytelling in a similar manner to The Legend of Zelda: A Link to the Past. Amy Hennig, the game's director, likened the technological advance from Blood Omen to Soul Reaver to the evolution of The Legend of Zelda series from the Super Nintendo to the Nintendo 64—bringing the franchise into 3D while maintaining a similar style.

Before Soul Reaver's release, the relationship between Silicon Knights and Crystal Dynamics dissolved. Because their research was used, Silicon Knights filed an injunction to stop further promotion of the game. Other delays pushed the release date from October 1998 to August 1999.

An early version of the Glyph menu during development, which was cut from the final version of the game

These delays forced Crystal Dynamics to cut significant game material, including additional powers for Raziel, a third battle with Kain, and an expanded Glyph system which would have given elemental powers to the Soul Reaver. In an interview, series director Amy Hennig stated that the development team split the original, much larger plans in two after realizing that they had "over-designed the game", given the constraints on time and data. This decision explains Soul Reaver's cliffhanger ending and the appearance of originally planned material in later games. Despite the split, Hennig explained that the team left unused components - such as extra power-ups and enemies - in Soul Reaver's game engine to avoid unforeseen glitches that might have arisen from their removal.

=== Audio ===
Kurt Harland composed most of the music for Soul Reaver; Jim Hedges handled the remaining audio. Harland remarked that, under Amy Hennig's direction, he programmed music to change based on the current gameplay situation - for example, combat or swimming. This variation was accomplished through a custom Musical Instrument Digital Interface (MIDI) driver, which altered music based on signals from the game engine. Each vampire tribe had corresponding music; one tribe of vampires was associated with a slow, thumping theme to convey a sense of working machinery. To further fit the music to the environment, the sound team consulted level designers regarding layout and appearance. Music from both Soul Reaver and Soul Reaver 2 was released on a promotional soundtrack in 2001.

For the game's voice acting, Raziel was voiced by Michael Bell, and Tony Jay, who had provided the voice of Mortanius and other characters in Blood Omen, voiced The Elder God. Anna Gunn, Simon Templeman and Richard Doyle reprised their roles from Blood Omen as Ariel, Kain and Moebius. Bell, Templeman and Jay also provided the voices of Melchiah, Dumah and Zephon, respectively, and Neil Ross, who voiced Malek the Paladin and King Ottmar in Blood Omen, voiced Rahab.

== Marketing and release ==
Soul Reaver was showcased at the 1998 E3, where attendees were given free demo discs. Additional demo discs were bundled with The Unholy War and an issue of Official PlayStation Magazine ahead of the game's release date. Soul Reaver was released for the PC and Sony PlayStation in 1999 and for the Dreamcast version in 2000. The Dreamcast version used a much higher frame rate than did the PlayStation or PC version, and the Dreamcast port had further graphical enhancements. A Japanese PlayStation release for the game was planned, but canceled. In 2000, Soul Reaver was added to Sony's "Greatest Hits" list, and the combined, global sales of its PlayStation, Dreamcast and computer versions surpassed 1.4 million units by late 2001. Sony later re-released the game for digital download on the PlayStation Network in 2009.

Eidos Interactive, the game's publisher, spent US$4,000,000 on a pre-release advertising campaign, which included magazine articles, television ads, and a tie-in comic book published by Top Cow Productions. It was also featured on the cover of several general video game magazines as well as PlayStation specific ones. The campaign included online banner ads and in-store standees and demos. Because such films like Stir of Echoes, The Sixth Sense, The Blair Witch Project and The Mummy had premiered earlier in 1999, Soul Reaver's release was considered "ideally timed" for a horror-oriented game. The lack of load times was a key marketing point praised by several reviewers. After release, Eidos and BBI partnered to release action figures of Raziel and Kain.

The PlayStation version of the game initially received a Teen rating from the ESRB, but this version's rating was increased to Mature when it was released as a Greatest Hits title, which is also retained with its PSN reissue. The Dreamcast port of the game had always been rated Mature.

== Reception ==
Reception

Aggregate scores
Aggregator	Score
GameRankings	PS: 88% PC: 78% DC: 88%
Metacritic	PS: 91/100

Review scores
Publication	Score
AllGame	3.5/5
Computer Gaming World	3/5
Edge	8/10
Game Informer	8.5/10
GameSpot	9/10
IGN	9.3/10
Next Generation	PS: 4/5; SDC: 4/5
PlayStation Official Magazine – UK	9/10

Daniel Erickson reviewed the PlayStation version of the game for Next Generation, rating it four stars out of five, and stated that "Difficult puzzles and the omission of a map make this stylized game for hardcore adventure-gamers only."

Soul Reaver's dark and gothic atmosphere was generally well-received, and several publications praised the game's cut scenes. IGN's reviewer called it "such an ambitious game – and one that achieves nearly everything it sets out to do – that few games come close to it", and praised the soundtrack for blending with the atmosphere unobtrusively. The Dreamcast port was cited as "perhaps one of the best looking console games ever made". Next Generation Magazine echoed this, stating that, "even if you own the PlayStation version, you may want to rent this anyway", but expressed disappointment that no new features were added to the Dreamcast port. AllGame's reviewer called the cut scenes "seamless", and their frequency neither too high nor too low. The game's storyline was praised by Game Informer as being "grim and interesting". Soul Reaver's voice acting was also highly praised; GameSpot ranked this aspect of the game in its list of top ten "Best Voice Acting in Games". GameSpot also considered the atmosphere as rich as that of Blood Omen, yet less dramatically overstated, and considered the graphics "among the best that have ever been on the PlayStation."

GamePro praised the aspect of shifting between realms, particularly the visual effects involved. Similarly, Edge described the transition between realms as a "complex and inspired piece of design", noting that it makes players think on different levels and consider "each room as two rooms, the answer to a puzzle possibly existing in either." However, the magazine criticized the save system for occasionally forcing players to replay large sections of the game to get to new areas. IGN stated that acquiring and learning the powers of Raziel's brothers constituted part of the fun, and that Raziel's moves were well animated and articulated. Finding minimal difficulty in using camera controls, GameSpot likened them to those of Banjo-Kazooie and stated that players would want to adjust the camera deliberately to watch Raziel's movements. Presenting differences between Soul Reaver and the Tomb Raider series, AllGame stated that the game's puzzles would challenge "all but the most experienced gamers", while Game Informer considered the puzzles "difficult-to-the-point-of-insanity". Computer Gaming World enjoyed the devouring of souls.

Website reviewers deemed Soul Reaver's gameplay too non-linear and its objectives too unclear. GameSpot criticized the warp system for using confusing symbols that did little or nothing to indicate the warp's destination, and weighed the fun of impaling vampires with the Soul Reaver against the lack of challenge presented by bosses and most enemies. Next Generation Magazine considered the game challenging due to "difficult puzzles and lack of a map", requiring the player to backtrack. The Tampa Tribune also criticized the camera controls, though noted that the "auto-facing" feature made the difficulties negligible. PC Zone criticized the PC port of the game for "chunky" graphics and bad camera controls, stating "it feels too much like a PlayStation release ported hurriedly on to the PC". Computer Gaming World similarly felt that the limitations of the PlayStation carried over in the PC port, rendering the latter's visuals "mind-numbingly boring". The publication praised the Lucifer-based story for engaging players, but was disappointed that "it peters out in an unsatisfying climax". Game Informer stated, "Even after years in development, Soul Reaver doesn't feel finished. It feels rushed." 1UP.com ranked Soul Reaver second on its "Top 5 Games That Ended Halfway Through", stating "it's pretty clear that the plot would have been a lot different if the money hadn't inconveniently run out." GamesRadar placed Soul Reaver at #4 on a 2007 list of the top seven video game apocalypses, regarding the post-apocalyptic Nosgoth as "one of the most fascinating wastelands we've ever explored".

During the 3rd Annual Interactive Achievement Awards, the Academy of Interactive Arts & Sciences nominated Legacy of Kain: Soul Reaver for "Console Adventure/Role-Playing Game of the Year".
