= Legacy of Kain: Defiance =

2003 video game

- Developer: Crystal Dynamics (Note: Ported to Xbox and Windows by Nixxes Software)
- Publisher: Eidos Interactive
- Director: Amy Hennig
- Producer: Rosaura Sandoval
- Designer: Riley Cooper
- Programmer: Jason Bell
- Artist: Daniel Cabuco
- Writers: Amy Hennig; Carol Wolf
- Composer: Jim Hedges
- Series: Legacy of Kain
- Platforms: PlayStation 2 Xbox; Windows; PlayStation 4 PlayStation 5
- Release: PlayStation 2, Xbox: NA: November 11, 2003; EU: February 6, 2004; Windows: NA: December 17, 2003; EU: February 6, 2004; PlayStation 4, PlayStation 5: NA: September 16, 2025; EU: September 16, 2025
- Genre: Action-adventure
- Mode: Single-player

Legacy of Kain: Defiance is a 2003 action-adventure video game developed by Crystal Dynamics and published by Eidos Interactive for PlayStation 2, Xbox and Windows. It is the fifth and final chronological game in the Legacy of Kain series.

Defiance continues the journey of the Vampire lord Kain and his lieutenant-turned-wraith Raziel. After having Raziel killed to be revived by the Elder God as a wraith during the events of Legacy of Kain: Soul Reaver, Kain travels backwards through time and is followed by Raziel into Nosgoth's past, uncovering the conspiratorial events that led to the land being doomed to an eternity of corruption. After establishing his free will by refusing to kill Kain when prophesied, Raziel discovers that Moebius the Time Streamer had originally manipulated Kain into igniting a genocidal war against Vampires until he was the last of his kind. In manipulating Raziel who has free will and thus whose decisions and actions cannot be foreseen by Moebius, Kain hopes to find a way to undo the consequences of his actions and restore Nosgoth to its former glory.

The emulated PlayStation 2 version of the game was released digitally in the PlayStation Store as part of the classics program for PlayStation 4 and PlayStation 5 on September 16, 2025. It launched as part of the game catalogue of the Premium tier of PlayStation Plus.

A remastered version of the game was released on March 3, 2026, as Legacy of Kain: Defiance Remastered.

== Gameplay ==
Kain uses his telekinesis to throw a Sarafan priest onto a spike set into the wall.

Defiance is the only game in the series where both Raziel and Kain are playable: previous Soul Reaver installments focused on Raziel while the Blood Omen series focused on Kain. Unlike previous games where Kain could acquire different types of weapons, in Defiance the only available weapon for Kain is the Soul Reaver - Kain possesses the material Reaver while Raziel possesses the Reaver's spectral form and several elemental reavers. However while Kain uses one weapon, he can obtain five emblems to enhance the Soul Reaver which are: balance, conflict, dimension, energy and time. Raziel retains all his previous weapons like in the first games. By killing enemies, Raziel and Kain learn new combat techniques, including uppercuts, mid-air slashes, and firing orbs of telekinetic energy. Some techniques are shared by the two, others are unique to them, such as Kain's "Cadaverous Laceration". Raziel and Kain can also acquire various elemental powers that give them new abilities - the Conflict Emblem lets Kain use pyrokinesis to light torches while Raziel's Dark Reaver lets him turn invisible and pass certain obstacles and enemies without being noticed. When an enemy is weakened, Kain and Raziel can either absorb their blood/soul to replenish their health, or slay them with the Reaver, gradually filling up a meter that lets the Reaver unleash an area of effect spell to attack groups of enemies. Both Raziel and Kain can acquire various runes to increase their health and allow them to use their telekinetic powers more often. A menu system is used to display the character's combat experience, the runes they have collected and the various combos they have learned to execute.

The game begins with players controlling Kain, but at set intervals they will acquire control of Raziel and play as him for a time before switching back to Kain. Both possess similar powers, including climbing walls, gliding in mid-air and phasing through certain gates. However, both also have abilities exclusive to them: Kain can jump large gaps, transform into a swarm of bats and cannot swim, while Raziel swims and can shift into the spectral realm to bypass enemies and obstacles before finding an appropriate place to shift back into the material realm. Kain is also able to use his telekinesis to pick up enemies and either throw them into obstacles or pull them towards him, an ability Raziel lacks at first and must acquire during the course of the game. Enemies include Sarafan warrior-priests, Vampire hunters, Hylden-possessed corpses called Revenants, and various types of Demons.

== Story ==
The story continues from where Soul Reaver 2 ended. As the game opens, Kain saved Raziel's life by drawing the Soul Reaver from him - Raziel was meant to enter the blade and become its soul-devouring spectral half. This causes a time paradox that changes Nosgoth's history for the worse, and separates Kain and Raziel.

Kain's part of the game follows him seeking Moebius the Time Streamer, the guardian of time for answers to where Raziel is, how he has changed time, and later following a lead Moebius gives him to explore a Vampire citadel. During his quest, Kain finds and completes a broken talisman of Vampire construct known as the Balance Emblem. Kain discovers murals during his quest dictating an ancient war between the first races to inhabit Nosgoth, the Ancients and the Hylden. After sealing the Hylden in an alternate dimension using the Pillars of Nosgoth, the Hylden cursed the Ancients with bloodthirst, sterility and immortality, turning them into the first Vampires. Kain discovers from the murals that it was prophesied that both races would have a champion arise - a Vampire champion wielding the Soul Reaver, and a Hylden champion wielding a flaming sword. Because he possesses the material Soul Reaver depicted, Kain comes to believe he is the prophesied Vampire champion. The outcome of the battle between the two champions remains ambiguous.

Raziel's part of the game begins five hundred years later during the time of Blood Omen. Held captive by the Elder God, Raziel escapes his master and travels about Nosgoth hoping to find a way to avoid his fate of being imprisoned in the Soul Reaver. After being told by the Reaver's maker Vorador that only the deceased Janos Audron can give him the answers he seeks, Raziel travels to Avernus Cathedral to find Janos' heart and revive him. Raziel also finds murals of the Hylden and Ancients, showing the Ancients committing suicide in horror of their immortality. Raziel later discovers this is because the Ancients worshipped the Elder God, who had decreed all souls had to spin in a cycle of life and death known as the Wheel of Fate. Because they were immortal, their souls could not follow this doctrine and the Ancients became the bane of the entity they once revered. Raziel also finds murals of the two prophesied champions, and discovers that the Hylden champion and its flaming sword resemble him and the spectral Soul Reaver.

As Raziel enters Avernus Cathedral to search for Janos' heart, in the past Kain explores the Vampire citadel's deepest chambers and is contacted by the Elder God who tells him of what Raziel plans. Knowing what Janos' revival would cause (see Blood Omen 2), Kain accepts the Elder God's assistance and is sent to Raziel's time. In Avernus, after defeating the last of his brethren Turel, Raziel discovers Mortanius the Necromancer, who admits having helped Moebius lead the original crusade against the Vampires, and used Janos' heart to revive Kain as a Vampire to atone for his mistakes. Raziel returns to the cathedral's chapel moments after Kain arrives. Kain attempts to reason with Raziel and convince him not to revive Janos, but Raziel is under the influence of the Hylden and refuses to listen. The two battle, with Raziel defeating Kain and tearing Janos' heart from his chest. Kain, seemingly dying, is engulfed by a portal and vanishes. Raziel returns to Vorador's Mansion and uses the Heart of Darkness to revive Janos, (Note: against Kain's warnings to not do so in the finale of Soul Reaver 2) who leads him to the Vampire citadel.

Raziel stumbles into a side chamber, the place where Kain had met the Elder God, and finds a forge designed to give the Soul Reaver its greatest power. However, the Elder God's tentacles emerge and attempt to bury the forge. Raziel fights off his master and has the Soul Reaver absorb the soul of Ariel, rendering the Reaver as pure of spirit. Ariel tells Raziel that this purified Soul Reaver is meant to be used by the Scion of Balance; evidence points towards Kain being the Scion of Balance, confusing Raziel as he returns to Janos.

At this time during the events of Blood Omen, Kain's past self refuses to sacrifice himself to restore the Pillars of Nosgoth, weakening the Ancients' seal enough for the Hylden Lord to possess Janos. The possessed Janos strikes down Raziel's physical body and causes him to shift to the spectral realm where he is again held captive in the Elder God's lair. Kain awakens, very much alive, trapped within the Demon Realm of the Hylden, and fights off their demons to return to Nosgoth. Entering the Vampire citadel, Kain finds Moebius reporting to the Elder God. Kain kills Moebius, causing his soul to shift to the Spectral Realm where Raziel impales him on the spectral Soul Reaver, revealing the Elder God's true form to him before devouring him. Undaunted, the Elder God informs him that he no longer had any use for Moebius, and it now intends to trap Kain and Raziel within the citadel for all time to prevent them from interfering with its plans any further. Raziel then considers all he has learned, and realizes that, through starting the war between the Ancients and the Hylden, and the war between humans and Vampires through Moebius, that the Elder God has been the cause of almost every hardship the land has faced in an attempt to keep its Wheel of Fate turning.

Realizing what has to be done as his final act of free will, Raziel uses Moebius' corpse to manifest in the Material Realm and tricks Kain into stabbing him with the material Soul Reaver before the manifestation completes. Kain is horrified and attempts to remove the sword, but Raziel reaffirms both his free will and his loyalty to Kain, stopping him in the process. Raziel passes on the purified Soul Reaver into Kain to heal both Kain's corruption caused by Nupraptor's madness as well as the open wound in his chest from Janos' missing heart. It also allows Kain to see the Elder God but at the same time sacrifices Raziel to the Blood Reaver, making it the original Soul Reaver. Kain now has two versions of the Soul Reaver, uniting what had been torn asunder by Moebius and the Elder God's manipulations. This gives Kain the power to defeat the Elder God and the entity warns it cannot be killed and will return before being buried under the rubble of the collapsing Reaver forge. As the story closes with Kain looking out on the Pillars of Nosgoth that his past self had just corrupted, he thanks Raziel for giving him hope for the future.

== Reception ==
The spectral realm was criticized for having distracting and disorienting graphics.

Reception

Aggregate score
Aggregator	Score		
Aggregator	PC	PS2	Xbox
Metacritic	70/100	75/100	74/100

Review scores
Publication	Score		
Publication	PC	PS2	Xbox
Edge	N/A	4/10	N/A
Game Informer	N/A	8/10	8/10
GamePro	N/A	4.5/5	4.5/5
GameSpot	6.9/10	6.9/10	6.9/10
GameSpy	N/A	3/5	3/5
GameZone	N/A	8.5/10	8.5/10
IGN	8/10	8/10	8/10
Official U.S. PlayStation Magazine	N/A	2.5/5	N/A
Official Xbox Magazine (US)	N/A	N/A	8/10
PC Gamer (UK)	52%	N/A	N/A

The PlayStation 2 version received "generally favorable reviews", while the PC and Xbox versions received "average" reviews, according to the review aggregation website Metacritic.

Douglass C. Perry of IGN praised the game's plotline for finally resolving many questions that previous installments had left unanswered, as well as being able to play as both Raziel and Kain and the new combat system revolving around various combos and spells unleashed by the Soul Reaver. The differences in their gameplay, with Kain's quests revolving around combat and Raziel's around puzzle solving, were also enjoyed. However, the poor collision system, auto-locking combat view and awkward camera controls were criticized for making combat difficult as the player would target enemies that could not be seen. Perry also noted the graphics for the Spectral Realm were distracting and made combat difficult. Greg Kasavin of GameSpot praised the series as a whole for not one but two involving and memorable protagonists, but the camera controls were noted to be confusing and the combat system was criticized for focusing on the Soul Reaver as well as the lack of variety in enemies, leading to players utilizing the same combos over and over to defeat them. The site also noted that Raziel and Kain play identically with very similar controls and abilities. Raziel's need to shift between the Material and Spectral planes to complete his quest was criticized for being too tired since the mechanic was introduced in the first game and were less fun than Kain's combat-oriented quests. Overall, Kasavin said the storyline would please fans of the series, but the gameplay was disappointing.

Tony Guidi of TeamXbox noted the simultaneous similarities and differences in the controls for Raziel and Kain. However, the need to re-imbue the Soul Reaver with elemental powers that it had already gained in previous games was noted to be confusing and led to similar gameplay as in previous installments revolving around gaining a new Reaver power and using that power to move forward. The camera system was heavily criticized for being confusing and leading players to unwillingly backtrack when the camera angle shifts suddenly. The game's shift to combat and away from puzzle solving was also criticized. The graphics were noted to be high quality, but not as groundbreaking as previous games in the series. Tariq Baker of GameSpy praised the combat system of the PS2 and Xbox versions but criticized their puzzle element for being reliant of block puzzles as its predecessors were. Despite the praise for the combat system, the similarities between the controls for Raziel and Kain were cited as the game's weakest point, to the extent where abilities either of them possessed in previous installments were dropped to make them play almost identically. The need to backtrack without the assistance of a map or clear objectives was also criticized. Overall, Baker said the combat system and graphics were well done, but the game's reliance on puzzles and backtracking was a weak point. Joe Rybicki of Official U.S. PlayStation Magazine praised the game's plot, voice acting, animation, character design and architecture, and said that it had "loads and loads of atmosphere", but called it "a terrible, terrible game", due to his belief that its gameplay is "so appallingly unimaginative, so awfully monotonous that by the end of it, I was wondering why they even bothered making a game out of it." Rybicki concluded: "If it weren't for the story in [the] last, say, 10 percent of the game [...] I probably would have scored Defiance a full point lower. Translation: This is for serious fans of the series only."

== Notes ==
- Although the in-game script implies that Raziel is the Hylden champion and Kain is the Vampire champion, series writer Amy Hennig has since stated that because Raziel possesses free will, he is both and may choose either role, which is why Raziel is referred to several times as "redeemer and destroyer" in the game. In allowing Kain to kill him and acquire the means to defeat the Elder God, Raziel triumphs and destroys himself at the same time.
