= Kain (Legacy of Kain) =

Title character of the Legacy of Kain series

- Legacy of Kain character
- Kain in Legacy of Kain: Defiance (2003)
- First game: Blood Omen: Legacy of Kain (1996)
- Created by: Denis Dyack
- Voiced by: Simon Templeman

Kain is a character and the main protagonist and title character of the Legacy of Kain video game series. First introduced in Blood Omen: Legacy of Kain in 1996, he was created by Denis Dyack and Silicon Knights, and has appeared in all subsequent Legacy of Kain games under the direction of developer Crystal Dynamics. Between games, he serves as either the central playable character, or as an antagonist, but in all his depictions he has consistently been described as an antihero.

Drawing inspiration from the morally ambiguous character of William Munny from Clint Eastwood's 1992 film Unforgiven, Silicon Knights conceived Kain as a nobleman murdered and revived as a vampire to take revenge on his assassins. He gradually embraces his new existence, and learns of his birthright to maintain balance in Nosgoth (the fictional setting of the series). Crystal Dynamics later portrayed Kain as an Oedipus-like figure, seeking to thwart the fate determined for him before his birth.

Beyond his role in the series, Kain has also featured in tie-in comics, and in Crystal Dynamics' Lara Croft and the Guardian of Light. In all of his voiced appearances, he has been played by actor Simon Templeman. He has been favorably received by critics and fans, with praise centering around his memorable personality, nuanced characterization and moral greyness; his transition from protagonist in Blood Omen to antagonist in Legacy of Kain: Soul Reaver was positively singled out.

== Concept and creation ==
Kain is very much the focus of the series, though. If you remove the melodrama and just look at the human elements of his character, you can see that he's flawed. Depending on how you look at things you could call him a tragic hero or an anti-hero. In my opinion, characters painted as 'true villains' just aren't interesting. They're too two-dimensional; no one is ever really so uncomplicated. Everyone always has their motives for what they're doing - everybody believes they're doing the right thing within their belief system. Kain is basically screwed by his own character flaws - which is more interesting than the idealized hero figure.

— Amy Hennig, Official U.S. PlayStation Magazine, September 2002

Kain's character was originally conceived circa 1993 by Silicon Knights' president, Denis Dyack, as the protagonist of The Pillars of Nosgoth, an initial video game concept for what would become 1996's Blood Omen: Legacy of Kain. He was modeled in part on William Munny, the protagonist of Clint Eastwood's 1992 Western film, Unforgiven. The developers set out to craft an antihero to suit "a game where the player is put in the position where everyone believes you are evil", feeling that the industry required a story addressing issues of moral ambiguity and wondering how players would react when "everyone in the world was your enemy (including yourself) [...] where you had to kill innocents to survive [and] you are the ultimate pawn". Other influences which helped to define Kain's character arc included The Wheel of Time, Necroscope, and cover art from The Pillars of the Earth. In comparison to Count Dracula, Dyack commented in an interview that he believed Kain would "kick his ass" in a fight. He and writer Ken McCulloch considered Simon Templeman's voiceover for the character superlative, despite initial apprehensions that the actors they had hired might not be able to convey the game's complicated dialogue.

After a legal dispute with Silicon Knights, Blood Omen publisher Crystal Dynamics obtained the rights to the Legacy of Kain intellectual property, with Amy Hennig directing Kain's characterization for the sequel, 1999's Legacy of Kain: Soul Reaver. In this game, which built upon the Blood Omen ending in which he damns the world, Kain adopted the role of antagonist, with new character Raziel serving as the lead. Hennig justified this choice, believing that it would prove interesting to see what his decision had engendered after a few millennia. She emphasized, though, that she did not consider him a monster or mustache-twirling villain, remarking that "in many ways, he's a more complex and sympathetic character than Raziel himself". Sources which helped to formulate his role in the plot ranged from Biblical lore to Eastern myth and mysticism.

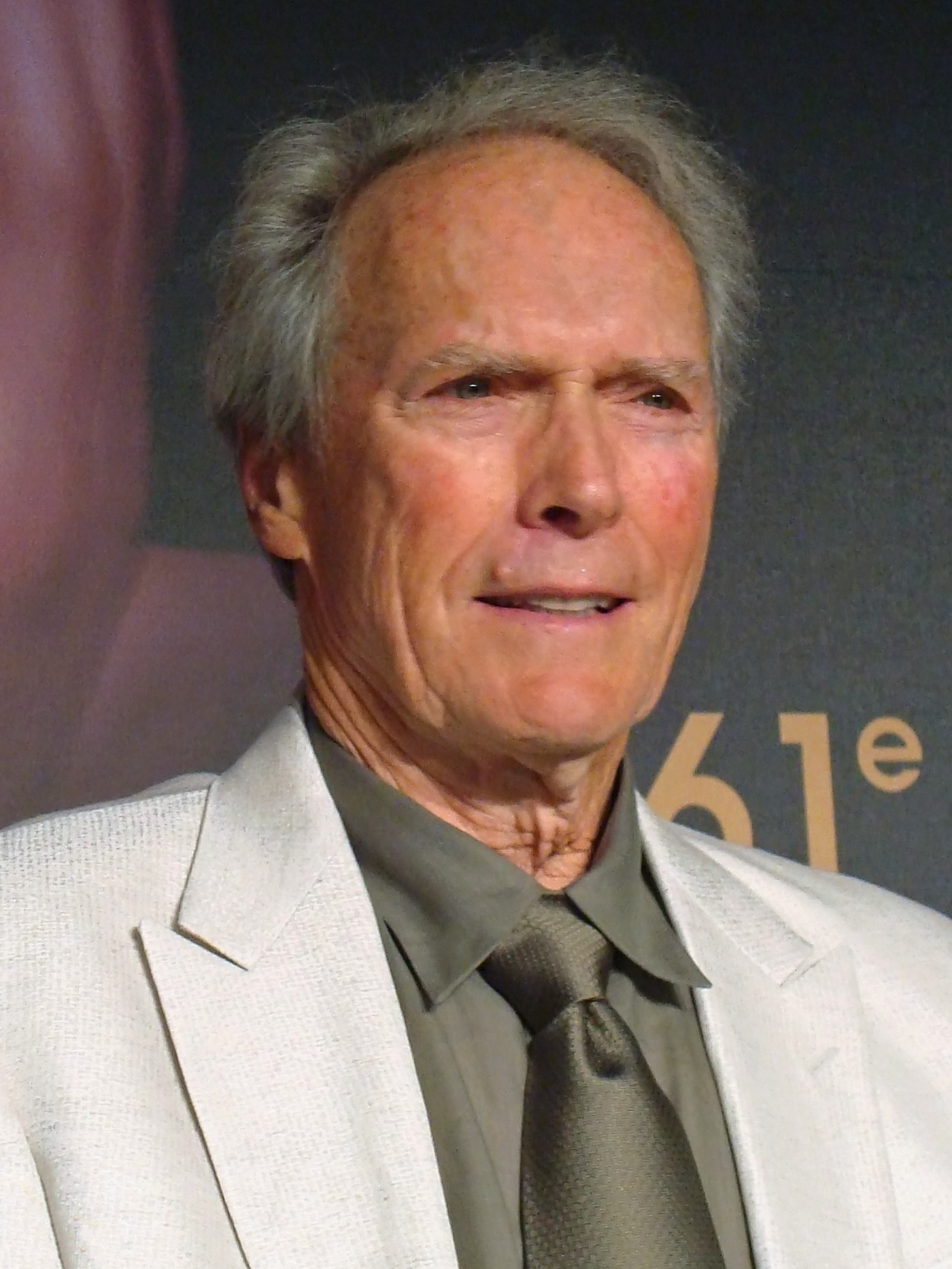
Clint Eastwood's character in Unforgiven inspired the moral ambiguity represented in Kain's portrayal.

In interviews preceding the release of 2001's Soul Reaver 2, Hennig said that Crystal Dynamics had a huge investment in Kain as a character. His portrayal in this game extrapolated further from Blood Omen's story, and was influenced by Joseph Campbell's ideals. No longer acting as a pure villain, Kain was intended to function as a "steadfast character", coming to the story from a position of knowledge in contrast to Raziel's relative ignorance. Hennig expressed that, by Soul Reaver 2, her personal perception of Kain's character had changed over the years, and that she now considered him a somewhat more attractive and interesting individual than Raziel due to his complexity. She dubbed him a tragic hero, "screwed by his own character flaws", and argued that this hamartia added to his depth. Since joining Naughty Dog, when asked whether Raziel or Kain is closest to her heart, Hennig has said that while Raziel is a sympathetic protagonist, she probably prefers Kain as a character.

For 2002's Blood Omen 2, developed by a different team within Crystal Dynamics, Kain returned as the playable protagonist. The development staff chose to focus on his rise to power as a younger vampire, combining aspects of his Blood Omen and Soul Reaver incarnations. He was marketed as a more powerful and ruthless character than traditional video game heroes, with lead designer Mike Ellis inviting comparison to Final Fantasy VI's Kefka Palazzo and Revolver Ocelot of the Metal Gear series. Design issues, raised by the wealth of abilities and equipment he accumulated in Blood Omen, prompted the team to add to his backstory and convincingly deprive him of these powers. Producer Sam Newman described him as "a very unique character" who "doesn't fit to the generic character molds you find in many other games, books and movies [...] not good, he's not necessarily evil - Kain does as Kain believes".

Legacy of Kain: Defiance, released in 2003, returned to the aged, elder Kain from Soul Reaver and Soul Reaver 2, now controllable alongside Raziel. The prospect of making this incarnation of Kain playable left the development team "very excited", and was agreed upon very early in pre-production. Recognizing that he is "the most important character in the series", designer Kyle Mannerberg named several parallels and influences concerning his development up to that point, citing Neo and John Murdoch (the protagonists of The Matrix and Dark City respectively), the archetypal Fisher King of Arthurian legend, the story of Oedipus, and Gnostic myth as inspirations (with both latter sources being reaffirmed as strong influences by Hennig in a later interview). The spells he obtains over the course of his levels were intended to pay homage to the original Blood Omen.

== Characteristics ==
Kain's appearance undergoes "pretty dramatic changes" throughout the games as he ages, but core personality attributes cited by Defiance's developers include his intelligence and cynicism, arrogance and regality, and his defiant nature. In the series' fictional universe, he is described as the guardian of balance, a being responsible for preserving the health and integrity of Nosgoth (the games' setting), but left incapable of realizing this duty due to spiritual corruption that he inherited at birth.

The character's transformation into a vampire, and the visceral nature this trait lends the series, was derived from William Shakespeare's classical models: "for the drunken commoners in the front rows he would insert dirty jokes to keep them entertained but for the aristocracy in the balconies he would write very cerebral metaphors". According to Silicon Knights, the graphic violence and vampirism in Blood Omen served as their "dirty jokes", supplemented by a complex story.

As the story progresses, Kain evolves from a directionless young nobleman, to a lithe and devious vampire, to a "craggy" figure. As a playable character, he frequently narrates his thoughts through the dramatic device of soliloquy. In Blood Omen and Defiance, his battle cry and catchphrase is Vae victis, a Latin phrase attributed to Brennus meaning "woe to the conquered".

== Appearances ==
=== Debut ===
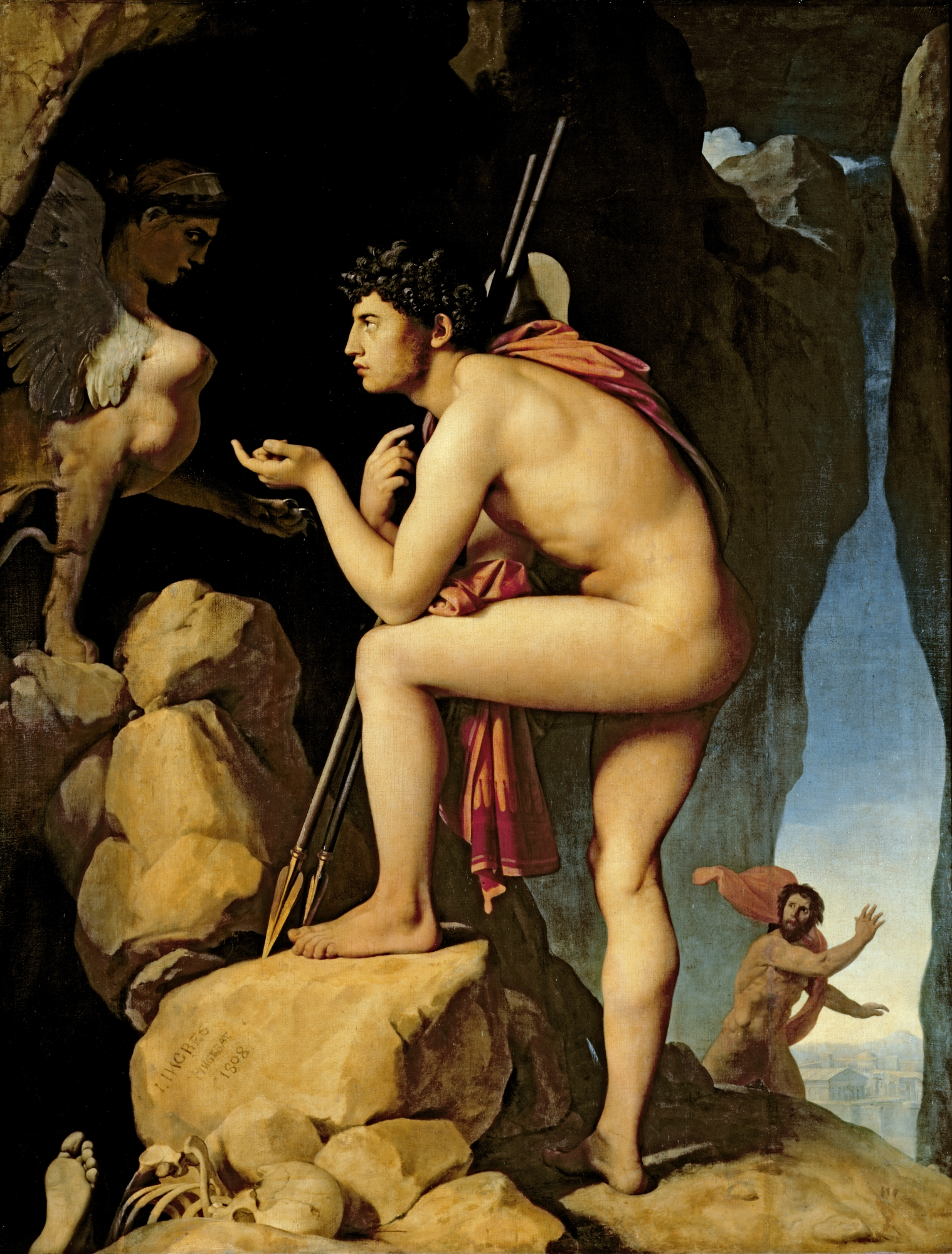
The story of Oedipus significantly influenced Kain's development in later games (in a Sophoclean rather than Freudian sense).

In Blood Omen: Legacy of Kain, Kain is introduced as a young human noble. In the game's prologue, he is murdered by assassins, and resurrected as a vampire by Mortanius, a necromancer. He is promised both vengeance and a cure to his vampirism if he can restore the nine Pillars of Nosgoth, edifices whose state dictates the vitality of the world; the nine guardians who symbiotically represent the Pillars were corrupted prior to his birth, and must be killed before the land can recover. During his quest, he meets the ancient vampire Vorador, who influences him to forsake his former humanity and accept his vampirism, and discovers the Soul Reaver, a legendary soul-devouring sword. Using the Reaver, he tries to alter the course of Nosgoth's history to prevent the Nemesis — a tyrant king — from coming to power. Tricked by Moebius, the guardian of time, Kain succeeds in destroying the Nemesis, but the temporal paradox this triggers results in a new timeline in which vampires have been hunted to extinction; Kain is left the last surviving vampire in Nosgoth. After systematically tracking down and killing most of the guardians, he confronts Mortanius — revealed as the guardian of death, and the orchestrator of Kain's assassination. After killing Mortanius, a malevolent, mysterious being known as The Dark Entity emerges from Mortanius's body where he tells Kain that he is the one who orchestrated the murder of Ariel (by possessing Mortanius) and the entire affair in Nosgoth, while Mortanius attempted to save Nosgoth and fight mentally against him before succumbing. Kain confronts The Dark Entity in final battle by slaying him. After the battle, Kain realizes that he himself is the final guardian, and that the cure to his curse entails his own destruction. Faced with the obligation of self-sacrifice — thereby restoring the world, but ensuring the annihilation of the vampire race or the alternative of destroying the Pillars to rule over the world in its miasmatic state. Although both options are available to the player, the canon established in the sequels proves that Kain opts for the latter choice, embracing vampirism as a blessing as the Pillars collapse.

=== Soul Reaver games ===
Legacy of Kain: Soul Reaver features Kain as the main antagonist and a recurring boss character, narratively following him centuries after his decision. Since the first game, Kain has revived the vampire race, and has become the despotic ruler of the land. When the game's protagonist, his lieutenant Raziel, surpasses Kain, Raziel is executed for his transgression. Resurrected by The Elder God, Raziel returns to destroy his former brethren and Kain, and eventually confronts Kain at the ruins of the Pillars. Kain attacks Raziel with the Soul Reaver, but the blade shatters when it strikes him, and Kain escapes, strangely satisfied. Raziel discovers, to his horror, that Kain created him and his other lieutenants from the corpses of the Sarafan, an ancient order of vampire hunters. He fights Kain a second time in Moebius's abandoned time machine, the Chronoplast, where Kain explains the nature of free will and rationalizes his actions. Narrowly escaping, Kain activates the Chronoplast and travels into the past, with Raziel pursuing him as the game ends.

In Soul Reaver 2, Kain acts as a non-player character encountered by Raziel in several cutscenes. As the game's plot progresses, his agenda and motives become clearer. He seeks a third option to the dilemma prescribed for him at the end of Blood Omen, hoping to both restore Nosgoth and return the Pillars to vampire control. Having viewed the timestream, he learned that history is predestined, and seeks to change his fate by triggering more temporal paradoxes, an objective which demanded Raziel's temporary destruction. It is revealed that Raziel is destined to be consumed by the Soul Reaver, thus becoming the soul-devouring entity trapped within the weapon. With Raziel's help, Kain is able to defy history and prevent his own pre-ordained death, and, in return, he saves Raziel from being consumed by the Reaver at the story's climax. However, this alteration putatively changes history for the worse, leading into the events of Blood Omen 2 and Legacy of Kain: Defiance.

=== Blood Omen 2 and Defiance ===
Blood Omen 2 pursues a younger Kain during his early conquests of Nosgoth, in the altered timeline triggered by the changes to Raziel's destiny at the end of Soul Reaver 2. Legacy of Kain: Defiance takes place in the same altered timeline, periodically switching between the characters of the elder Kain and Raziel from Soul Reaver 2, with both acting as playable protagonists. Over the course of the game, Moebius manipulates Kain into believing he is a champion prophesied to fight against and destroy Raziel, culminating in a final battle between the two characters which Raziel wins. It is discovered that The Elder God is malevolent, and he and Moebius—his servant—had conspired against Kain from the outset of the series, considering vampires an abomination. Kain, after being presumed dead, returns, and reconciles with Raziel, who willingly enters the Soul Reaver. As he does so, he uses his powers to cleanse Kain of the corruption he inherited at birth as a Pillar guardian. Armed with the ancient sword once again, Kain is able to see and battle The Elder God for the first time, but is unable to destroy him. The story ends as he looks out at the Nosgoth landscape; though uncertain that he can ever restore the world, he contemplates Raziel's sacrifice and the "first bitter taste" of hope it has given him.

== Promotion and reception ==
Several action figures and figurines of Kain have been created by Blue Box Interactive and the National Entertainment Collectibles Association in partnership with Eidos. He was featured extensively in marketing for the Legacy of Kain series, including a $1 million advertising campaign for Soul Reaver. Beyond the games, he also appeared in Top Cow's promotional comics for Soul Reaver and Defiance, and was included alongside Raziel as a playable character in downloadable content for 2010's Lara Croft and the Guardian of Light. He is set to appear in Legacy of Kain: Soul Reaver – The Dead Shall Rise, a graphic novel prequel to Legacy of Kain: Soul Reaver.

Opinion on Kain's character has been largely positive in critical reviews of the Legacy of Kain games. Praise has frequently been directed towards Simon Templeman's voice acting, with IGN and Game Revolution citing Kain's soliloquies as "both gruesome and entertaining", "the best part [of the game's audio]" and "one of the best stints of voice acting ever recorded" respectively in their assessments of his debut in the original Blood Omen. Magazines have also described him as one of the best video game villains. GamesRadar+ praised Kain's role as an antagonist, but noted that he "lives in more of a grey area than most of the villains". For Blood Omen 2, although critics expressed disappointment with the game itself, they praised Kain's character nevertheless; GameSpot's Greg Kasavin branded him "a very intriguing protagonist" and "as memorable of a main character as they come", while IGN's Douglass C. Perry felt he was "incredibly likeable", and "in a very true sense [...] a great videogame character". GameZone's Michael Knutson opined that he was a "wicked cool character", and Game Revolution's Johnny Liu named him a "great anti-hero". Kasavin again praised him in a review for Defiance, writing that "it's rare enough to find a truly memorable main character in a game, let alone two", and that the game's ensemble cast "[to some extent superseded] the problems in the gameplay". Ian Dransfield of Play has stated that "we totally and completely fell in love with [Kain]" and highlighted him as a "character who [needs] to be revived".

Some reviewers were less enthusiastic about aspects of the character, with IGN's Perry commenting that his Soul Reaver 2 dialogue was haughty and "overwritten", and Ivan Sulic considering his Blood Omen 2 incarnation "nothing more than an arrogant jerk with little to latch on to and care about" while expressing preference for Raziel. Also relating to Blood Omen 2, IGN's Aaron Boulding regarded his pompous nature as his "one personality trait", and considered it comedic, while Matt Casamassina felt Kain was "cool", but decried his visual design as "flamboyant to the point of being comical". Alex Lucard of DieHard GameFan described Kain as an interesting character and one of gaming's most memorable vampires, discussing how his personality shifted between a portrayal as a "petty jealous monster" and a "wise but arrogant ruler." Alex felt this was not contradictory, as it felt like what a creature as old as Kain would experience, calling this aspect of his character ""well developed and tragic." He also found that the shift in character role was rare in the medium and made him "deep."
