= Raziel (Legacy of Kain) =

- Legacy of Kain character
- Raziel in Legacy of Kain: Defiance (2003)
- First game: Legacy of Kain: Soul Reaver (1999)
- Created by: Amy Hennig; Seth Carus; Arnold Ayala
- Voiced by: Michael Bell

Raziel is a fictional character and a main protagonist in the Legacy of Kain video game series. Introduced in 1999 as the lead and playable character of Legacy of Kain: Soul Reaver, he was created by Amy Hennig, Seth Carus and Arnold Ayala of Crystal Dynamics. He reappears as the protagonist of Soul Reaver 2, and returns as a playable character alongside series eponym, Kain, in Legacy of Kain: Defiance, which closes his story arc.

Portrayed as a tragic hero, Raziel is described as an "ex-vampire" or "wraith". First appearing in Soul Reaver as one of Kain's lieutenants, he is executed after surpassing Kain, but is "resurrected" by The Elder God as a reaver of souls, bent on avenging himself by slaying his brethren and former master. Over the course of this journey, his history is revealed in reverse, and his motivations and loyalties gradually change as he unearths the truth behind his cyclic destiny.

Raziel's story and appearance were inspired by several influences, including the 1920 silent film The Cabinet of Dr. Caligari, John Milton's Paradise Lost, and the Hindu god Vishnu. Outside of the main series, he has featured in two tie-in comics, and in Crystal Dynamics' Lara Croft and the Guardian of Light. In all of his voiced appearances, he has been played by Michael Bell. Video game critics and players have reacted positively to his character, praising his design, backstory and development.

== Concept and creation ==
The character of Raziel had a precursor in the protagonist of Shifter, a Paradise Lost-inspired game proposal worked on by Crystal Dynamics' Amy Hennig, Seth Carus and Arnold Ayala. During pre-production on Shifter, the development team was asked to adapt the project into a sequel to an earlier Crystal Dynamics-published title which Hennig and Carus had worked on - Blood Omen: Legacy of Kain - and Shifter's main character was reconceptualized as Raziel for the final product, Soul Reaver. His name was derived from that of the homonymous archangel, and his early concept art was influenced by Cesare from The Cabinet of Dr. Caligari. Dozens of sketches were produced to shape his final design; the Hindu god Vishnu provided the basis for his blue color, and his wings were intended to evoke those of fallen angels.

Raziel is voiced by Michael Bell in all of his appearances. In the series' fictional universe, he is described as an "ex-vampire", a "wraith", and a "devourer of souls", characterized by his skeletal figure, brown cowl, tattered wings and tridactyl claws and feet. Throughout the games, he is required to consume souls to survive, travels between two planes of existence (the material and spectral realms) to solve puzzles, and wields the wraith-blade—a ghostly version of the Soul Reaver, an ancient sword inhabited by a sentient spirit. The design of his human incarnation in Soul Reaver 2 was inspired by the Roman era. According to Hennig, Raziel's role in the story conforms to that of a tragic hero. While writing dialogue, she considered it important to include character flaws in his personality, enabling him to act as a foil to series protagonist Kain. In Soul Reaver, Raziel is depicted with aspects of both villainy and heroism, and in Soul Reaver 2, Hennig deliberately portrayed him as "kind of a self-righteous little twit" with a lot to learn.

== Appearances ==
=== In video games ===
The vampire Raziel, who appears in the opening of Legacy of Kain: Soul Reaver, was modeled and textured by artists at GlyphX.

Raziel is introduced in Legacy of Kain: Soul Reaver as a vampire sired by the spiritually corrupted despot Kain, the first of Kain's six lieutenants, and his second-in-command. He surpasses Kain, who - ostensibly motivated by jealousy - condemns Raziel to death. Raziel is resurrected by The Elder God, and traverses Nosgoth (the fictional setting of the series), embarking on a quest for vengeance. He confronts Kain, who attacks him with his legendary blade, the Soul Reaver; the Reaver mysteriously shatters when it strikes Raziel. The spirit formerly captive within the sword binds itself to Raziel, becoming his symbiotic weapon—the wraith-blade. Raziel discovers that, when they were human, he and the other lieutenants were the leaders of the ancient vampire-hunting Sarafan brotherhood; Kain found their corpses and raised them, unwitting, as vampires, in a calculated act of blasphemous irony. Raziel kills Kain's remaining lieutenants and tracks him down again, but is cheated of revenge when Kain activates a time machine and slips into Nosgoth's past.

In Soul Reaver 2, while in pursuit of Kain, Raziel explores the past, learning more of his own history as a former member of the Sarafan, and discovering Kain's ultimate goal—to restore balance to Nosgoth. Kain had Raziel executed in Soul Reaver in order to create a temporal paradox. By exploiting Raziel's unique free will, Kain can defy the course of history and alter time. In hopes of learning more about his destiny, Raziel time travels back to the era of the Sarafan, where the ancient vampire Janos Audron gifts him the Reaver—a younger version of the Soul Reaver blade, before it housed a ravenous spirit. However, they are ambushed by the Sarafan leaders, including Raziel's former self, who slays Janos. Raziel renounces his heritage by using the Reaver to kill his former comrades and his younger self, thus providing the corpses for Kain to turn into vampires in the future. The Reaver then turns against Raziel, and he realizes that the entity destined to become trapped within the blade has always been him; the sword shattered against him in Soul Reaver because it could not consume its own soul. Kain saves Raziel from being absorbed by the Reaver, but this causes a temporal paradox which changes Nosgoth's history for the worse, and only postpones Raziel's fate.

In Legacy of Kain: Defiance, Raziel discovers that it was prophesied in the distant past that two champions would battle to decide the fate of Nosgoth. Raziel seeks to revive Janos, but learns that he must kill Kain to do so. Coaxed into believing that he is the champion, Raziel fights Kain and defeats him. He resurrects Janos, who enables him to enhance the wraith-blade with spiritual powers, but to little avail; Raziel is trapped by The Elder God. While in captivity, he reaches the epiphany that he is both champions (Kain was neither); his free will allows him to determine Nosgoth's ultimate future. He reflects that the Elder is the cause of all the conflict and strife throughout history, and when Kain re-emerges, alive, with the Reaver, Raziel reconciles with him and willingly surrenders to the sword. Before his soul is consumed, he disperses the wraith-blade into Kain, simultaneously curing Kain's corruption, dooming himself to thousands of years of torment in the Reaver, and releasing his future self from that same imprisonment. Kain uses the newly created Soul Reaver to battle The Elder God, and concludes that Raziel's sacrifice has offered him hope.

=== In merchandise and promotion ===
Several action figures and figurines of Raziel have been created by Blue Box Interactive and the NECA in partnership with Eidos. He was also featured in Top Cow's promotional comics for Soul Reaver and Defiance, and appears alongside Kain as a playable character in downloadable content (DLC) for 2010's Lara Croft and the Guardian of Light. Additionally, his likeness is used by a bot in Astro's Playroom.

Raziel is set to appear in Legacy of Kain: Soul Reaver – The Dead Shall Rise, a graphic novel prequel to Legacy of Kain: Soul Reaver.

== Reception ==
Received positively by players and the gaming press, Raziel was praised by GameSpot's Greg Kasavin, who wrote in his review of Defiance that "it's rare enough to find a truly memorable main character in a game, let alone two", and closed deeming the title "one of those rare games whose characters and story to some extent supersede the problems in the gameplay". Electronic Gaming Monthly suggested in a 1999 preview that players "think of [Raziel] as a Solid Snake for the undead crowd [...] just the type of bad-ass, take-no-guff, not-quite-a-hero hero we like to see in our games. The key to this guy is more than just his rugged, rotten looks. Raziel's got a backstory so completely deep and sinister he's sure to become the poster boy for the Goth generation. [...] Heck, he's a bad guy even bad guys are afraid of." Official UK PlayStation Magazine similarly welcomed Raziel's debut in Soul Reaver, showcasing him on the cover of issue 43; his story and in-game appearance were endorsed, and in a comparison with Tomb Raider III, his free-flowing character animation was described as making "Lara look like a glove puppet". According to Tokoya of PSM, Raziel "captivated gamers with his dark character design and interesting, yet ominous, story." EGM's Shane Bettenhausen appreciated that "Raziel took lemons and made lemonade, channeling his rage into heroism."

Reviewing the Dreamcast port of Soul Reaver, IGN's Jeremy Dunham described Raziel's narrative as one of the most convincing he had ever heard, echoed later in the site's review for Legacy of Kain: Defiance, which described the series' cast as "just damn good at talking like vampires, tortured souls and gods". GameSpot included Soul Reaver in a 1999 list of ten computer games with the best voice acting of all time, stating about Bell that "you'd never guess that the same person carried out all those voices", and of the cast "there's not one weak link in the bunch, and together they create one of the best examples of voice acting in a game for PC or consoles". In contrast, Douglass C. Perry of IGN felt Raziel's (and Kain's) dialogue in Soul Reaver 2 was overdone, stating that "overwritten text makes them sound like caffeine-imbued English students verbally jousting in their first semester in college", but liked the advancement and rebalancing of Raziel's personality and aggressiveness, and enjoyed his depiction, stating that he "looks magnificently decripid [sic]". Steve Faragher for Official PlayStation 2 Magazine UK likewise wrote that "Raziel and Kain philosophizing endlessly about their destinies, or talking about life, death, demons and free will [feels] rather more like a particularly depressing episode of EastEnders than an action/adventure game," but he considered Raziel "an undeniably intriguing lead character whose invisible battles with his own inner demons may turn out to be as interesting as any of his battles with physical foes." Jesse Galena of The Escapist said in a retrospective that "the delivery is solid. Raziel has a poetic way of speaking, both when he's talking to others, and when he's musing to himself about something the player needs to know. His dialogue is engaging, and the voice acting is enjoyable, especially in that PS1 style."

=== Popularity ===
Alongside Kain, Raziel was selected by IGN's readers as one of ten heroes most wanted to appear in the 2008 fighting game Soulcalibur IV, and was ranked ninth on EGM's list of top ten badass undead that same year. In 2009, he was inducted into Diehard GameFAN's list of top ten video game vampires (dubbed "Not A Vampire #2"), and was included as one of GameSpot's 64 All Time Greatest Game Heroes, while Thunderbolt ranked him as ninth on their list of the top videogame antiheroes. In a Dreamcast retrospective, Topher Cantler of Destructoid described Raziel as "a truly likeable character as well as a badass". In 2012, Houston Press listed the character's demise in Legacy of Kain: Defiance among the top five most heartbreaking video game deaths, while IGN also listed Raziel and Kain among gaming's most notorious anti-heroes and "complex characters with a great backstory, and truly awesome anti-heroes, be they fighting against each other to enslave or save the world, or teaming up against greater threats". That same year, GamesRadar ranked him as the 56th "most memorable, influential, and badass" protagonist in games, adding that "as pissed-off vampire antiheroes go, few wear the title as proudly as Raziel". The Washington Post's Gene Park regretted in 2021 that "while Metal Gear needs no introduction, it's been 18 years since Raziel snarled his vows of revenge with a Shakespearean lilt".

Darksiders' creative director Joe Madureira, former Capcom artist and game designer Akiman, and Clash of the Titans concept artist Tsvetomir Georgiev have also created fan art interpretations of the character, while Ben Starr, voice actor for Final Fantasy XVI protagonist Clive Rosfield, singled Raziel out as the other video game character he would most like to play.

=== Critical analysis ===
I couldn't say who originally came up with the idea [to make Uncharted protagonist Nathan Drake vulnerable and flawed], but I do know, having worked with Amy for a long time, that this is an ongoing interest of hers. If you look at the Soul Reaver games, the heroes of those games, even though they're super-powered, they are, both Raziel and Kain, guys who struggle with themselves. In part because they've become monsters. This points to Amy's interest in that aspect of human experience. And she's done a really great job of bringing those ideas of vulnerability and characters you can relate to, because they're completely confident, because they don't feel like they have all the answers, which is something that nearly every human can relate to.

— Richard Lemarchand, CGMagazine, April 2015

Faragher noted parallels between Raziel and Michael Moorcock's characters Elric of Melniboné and the Eternal Champion. He observed that "in Moorcock's stories heroes are singled out against their will to fight in epic conflicts. They are pitted unwittingly into battles between the forces of Chaos and Law with the object of restoring the balance between the two – and thus harmony to the multiverse. Moorcock's most enduring creation was the noble albino sorcerer Elric who wielded a sword called Stormbringer that ate souls. Not a million miles from the hero of this game." In Debugging Game History: A Critical Lexicon, Marcelo Alejandro Aranda instead links Raziel's journey of discovery to that of Final Fantasy Tactics' protagonist Ramza Beoulve: "as happens to Ramza in FFT, Raziel's encounter with the past changes his perspective on his circumstances in the present, something that Hennig intended because she believes 'that time travel is ultimately a journey of epiphanies, where the protagonist realizes the role that he already played in history'". For Kill Screen, Sam Zucchi likened Raziel's character arc to the journey of a Kabbalist: "with the wraith Raziel, the game neatly inverts the traditional gnostic division between imperfect flesh and perfect spirit by rendering the spectral realm as one of horror [...] To rephrase this in a more pointed fashion, Raziel pursues his creator by navigating Kain's emanations." He highlighted that "Raziel's very name—a name meaning "Secrets of God" in Hebrew—invoke[s] the Kabbalah, where God sustains the world via a series of emanations or manifestations and the aspirant must travel up this system in order to attain understanding. [...] That Raziel must confront the lowest of Kain's children first and ascend up the hierarchy cements the parallel between his quest for revenge and the Kabbalist's quest for enlightenment."

Writing for Game Developer, Ben Serviss praised the effectiveness of Raziel's characterization in spite of his grotesque appearance: "you essentially play a zombie vampire who runs around killing monsters and eating their souls for energy. Yet by humanizing the events that lead up to player character Raziel's destruction and rebirth, the focus is on the characters and not the spectacle, creating meaning where most games are content to throw set pieces and playthings at the player in an attempt to cover up the absence of meaning ... [the game] sets Raziel up as a tragic figure that you feel for". Serviss empathized with the character: "Raziel has been destroyed, but has somehow been reborn. The reveal of his missing jaw and blue glowing eyes hints at an unholy quality, but you don't remark on the monster he's become. Instead, as he throws the scarf over his shoulder to hide his deformity, you feel for what he's gone through and lost." He felt "that Raziel is a noble creature put upon by Kain, and not a horrid monster in his own right." However, Edge's Edwin Evans-Thirlwell conversely felt that Raziel lacked nuanced motivations: "Kain's ability set lacks the mystique and sophistication of Raziel's. He is, however, a more involved character, where Raziel is driven simply by revenge."

The Chinese Room's Dan Pinchbeck, contributing to GamesIndustry.biz, wrote that "you could also tell that all of Soul Reaver's writers really, really loved their characters - particularly Raziel and his brothers. Or they did a damn good job of making it seem as if they did. Even though they're comic book and larger than life, they feel distinct and you engage with them on a narrative level." NME's Dom Peppiatt praised Raziel as an immersive player avatar: "you – Raziel – felt hunted and vulnerable at every turn [...] desperate, immortal and frail all at once." Peppiatt felt that "Raziel – at once a sympathetic character and hateful for his self-righteousness – is the perfect counterpoint to Kain, a hero playing the role of a tyrant king."
