= Blood Omen: Legacy of Kain =

1996 action-adventure video game

- Developer: Silicon Knights (Note: Windows version developed by Semi Logic Entertainments.)
- Publisher: Crystal Dynamics (Note: Windows version published by Activision.)
- Director: Denis Dyack
- Producers: Rick Goertz; Lyle Hall; Joshua Marks
- Designers: Seth Carus; Armando Marini; Ken McCulloch
- Programmers: Denis Dyack; Clint Lipczynski; Andrew Summerfield
- Artists: Darren Cranford; Kevin Gordon; Ken McCulloch
- Writers: Denis Dyack; Ken McCulloch
- Composer: Steve Henifin
- Series: Legacy of Kain
- Platforms: PlayStation; Windows
- Release: PlayStation: NA: November 1, 1996; EU: March 1997; Windows: NA: September 3, 1997; EU: 1997
- Genre: Action-adventure
- Mode: Single-player

Blood Omen: Legacy of Kain is a 1996 action-adventure video game developed by Silicon Knights and published by Crystal Dynamics for the PlayStation. A Windows port developed by Semi Logic Entertainments was released by Activision under license from Crystal Dynamics in 1997. It is the first title in the Legacy of Kain series. The game was re-released digitally via GOG.com in 2021.

In Blood Omen, the player follows Kain, a slain nobleman newly resurrected as a vampire. Seeking revenge against his murderers and a cure to his vampiric curse, Kain is tasked with traversing the fictional land of Nosgoth and slaughtering the Circle of Nine, a corrupt oligarchy of godlike sorcerers, but slowly begins to forsake humanity and view his transformation as a blessing.

Silicon Knights intended Blood Omen to be "a game which adults would want to play", intending to evolve the action role-playing genre and bring artistic cinema to video game consoles. Reviewers praised its scope and storytelling, but criticized its lengthy loading times. After its release, a dispute arose concerning ownership of its intellectual property rights, after which Crystal Dynamics retained the rights of the series and developed a sequel, Legacy of Kain: Soul Reaver.

== Gameplay ==
Screenshot of combat in the Battle of the Last Stand sequence. The heads-up display on the right indicates Kain's current equipment, health, and magic energy.

Blood Omen is a two-dimensional action-adventure game. The player controls the protagonist, Kain, from a top-down perspective. Gameplay is divided between outdoor traversal and dungeon crawls, entailing hack and slash combat, puzzle-solving, and navigating hazards. To advance the story, Kain must locate and defeat the members of the Circle of Nine - who act as boss enemies - and return their tokens to the Pillars of Nosgoth. Humans, animals, and a variety of fantasy creatures inhabit the game world, whom the player can typically elect to kill outright, or alternatively wound in order to feed on their blood. As a vampire, Kain is required to consume the red blood of living creatures to replenish his health meter, which gradually drains over time, and diminishes more quickly if he sustains damage. When he casts spells or shapeshifts, he expends magic energy—this recovers in time, and can be replenished by drinking the blue blood of ghostly enemies. Conversely, undead opponents relinquish harmful black blood, and demons and mutants yield green blood which poisons Kain, causing his health to deplete at a swifter rate.

Over the course of the main quest, Kain acquires many items and abilities, which facilitate increasingly nonlinear exploration. As he collects blood vials and rune pyramids, Kain's maximum blood and energy capacity rises. By drinking from blood fountains, he receives strength upgrades, faster magic regeneration, and immunity to weather effects. Weapons include iron and fire-elemental swords, a spiked mace, twin axes, and the Soul Reaver, a two-handed flamberge. Suits of iron, bone, chaos, flesh, and wraith armor feature, and each combination of equipment has advantages and drawbacks. Spells, in the form of magical tarot cards, are used in both strategic and practical contexts, their functions ranging from summoning artificial light to mind control and the evocation of lightning storms. Shapeshifting enables Kain to assume the forms of a bat, allowing for immediate travel to checkpoints; a wolf, with enhanced speed and the capacity to jump; a cloud of mist, which enables him to pass through gates and cross water; or a human, with which he can covertly interact with, or bypass, certain non-player characters. There are 100 secrets present in the game, logged if the player uncovers hidden areas, switches, and dungeons; these encompass spirit forges, at which Kain may donate a significant portion of his blood in exchange for powerful battle artifacts. A day and night cycle passes progressively - at night, Kain's attacks become more potent, and during full moon phases, some sealed doors become accessible.

== Plot ==
=== Setting ===
There is a Magical operation of maximum importance; the Initiation of a New Aeon. When it becomes necessary to utter a Word, the whole Planet must be bathed in blood...

— Blood Omen epigraph (Note: The Blood Omen epigraph that appears at the start of the game is a quote borrowed from the English esotericist and occult author Aleister Crowley: Magick in Theory and Practice, 1911, pages 96–97.)

Blood Omen introduces the land of Nosgoth, a fantasy setting dominated by humans and vampires. The health of the world is inextricably connected to the Pillars of Nosgoth—nine supernatural edifices, each one protected and represented by a human guardian. These sorcerers collectively comprise the Circle of Nine, and if a member dies, a new guardian is called to take their place by the Pillars. Hundreds of years prior to the events of the story, the Circle formed and sponsored the Sarafan, an order of monastic warriors devoted to eradicating the vampire race, and in the game's prologue, the vampire Vorador reacts vengefully by killing six of the guardians and defeating Malek, the Sarafan leader. Though the Sarafan disband, vampires continue to be persecuted.

In the intervening years, new guardians have been summoned, Nosgoth's surviving vampires have retreated into hiding, and humanity has separated into two opposing factions: the kingdom of Willendorf, inspired by Arthurian legend, and the Legions of the Nemesis, an all-conquering army determined to bring an end to civilization. When the guardian of balance, Ariel, dies at the hands of a mysterious, malevolent entity, her lover Nupraptor the Mentalist turns his powers against his fellow Circle members, tainting the incumbent guardians with irrevocable madness and leaving the Pillars corrupt. To restore balance to Nosgoth, Kain must overcome the Legions and kill the insane sorcerers; as each Circle member is purged and their token returned, their respective Pillar is cleansed, and when he heals all nine Pillars, replacement guardians can be born.

=== Characters ===
Kain (voiced by Simon Templeman), an ambitious, cynical young nobleman murdered and reluctantly raised as a vampire, is the protagonist of Blood Omen. Conceived as an antihero whose nature reflects the story's moral ambiguity, Kain was partially modeled on the character of William Munny from the 1992 Clint Eastwood film, Unforgiven. Mortanius the Necromancer (Tony Jay), an ancient wizard, resurrects Kain in a Faustian bargain, and serves as his enigmatic benefactor and semi-father figure throughout the game. The reclusive and decadent vampire Vorador (Paul Lukather) acts as a mentor and father figure to Kain, encouraging him to accept vampirism, whereas the specter of the deceased balance guardian, Ariel (Anna Gunn), directs Kain in his quest to restore the land. The corrupt guardians—such as Moebius the Time Streamer (Richard Doyle), a devious manipulator of history, and Malek the Paladin (Neil Ross), now an animated suit of armor eternally condemned to protect the Circle following his defeat against Vorador—feature as the villains in the game. Other major characters include King Ottmar (Ross), the ruler of Willendorf; The Nemesis (Jay), a once-benign monarch known as William the Just, turned despot and tyrant; and The Dark Entity (Jay), an otherworldly being capable of demonic possession who is the overall mastermind behind events, and a primary antagonist and final boss of Blood Omen, seeking to topple the Circle and the Pillars and establish its reign in Nosgoth.

=== Story ===
During a journey, the human nobleman Kain is ambushed and killed by a band of assassins. Mortanius offers him the chance to exact revenge; Kain assents, heedless of the cost, and awakes as a vampire. Once he kills his attackers, Mortanius tells him that, while they were the instruments of his death, they were not the ultimate cause. In search of the truth, and a cure to his vampiric curse, Kain travels to the Pillars of Nosgoth. There, Ariel explains that he has to destroy the Circle of Nine before he can realize peace. Kain begins by tracking down and killing Nupraptor, and then confronts Malek, but their duel ends in a stalemate. To defeat Malek, Kain solicits the advice of the Oracle of Nosgoth. The Oracle forewarns him of the Legions of the Nemesis, and instructs him to seek out Vorador, Malek's old adversary. When the two meet, Vorador welcomes Kain, and offers his assistance, but urges the fledgling to embrace vampirism and refrain from interfering in the affairs of mankind.

Haunted by the elder vampire, who serves as an example of what he will become if he fails to find a cure, Kain persists, and, in a decisive showdown, Vorador vanquishes Malek while Kain kills Bane the Druid and DeJoule the Energist. Later, after he slays Azimuth the Planer and recovers a time-streaming device, Ariel informs Kain that he must instead prioritize the war against The Nemesis, whose armies threaten to conquer Willendorf. Kain convinces King Ottmar to rally his troops against the Legions in a final stand, but the battle proves disastrous. Ottmar perishes, the Willendorf forces are overwhelmed, and Kain, cornered, uses the time-streaming device to escape. He emerges 50 years in the past, and kills the younger version of The Nemesis from this era—the beloved King William the Just—to trigger a temporal paradox which expunges the Legions from the timestream. However, when Kain returns to the present day, he discovers that William's murder has sparked a renewed vampire purge.

The Oracle of Nosgoth—revealed to be Moebius the Time Streamer, a member of the Circle—leads the genocidal crusade, and, having masterminded Kain's actions from the outset, consummates his trap by executing Vorador. Kain kills Moebius, but is left the last of his kind. At the Pillars, he witnesses Mortanius arguing with Anarcrothe the Alchemist, who reveals that Mortanius is a guardian, and culpable for both Ariel and Kain's deaths. Seduced by The Dark Entity, Mortanius was unwillingly controlled and forced to kill Ariel. To correct the imbalance, he created Kain, a creature potent enough to destroy the Circle. Mortanius slays Anarcrothe, and then succumbs to possession from The Dark Entity (the latter one's actions being the reason behind everything that happened in Nosgoth) whom Kain defeats. With only one Pillar left unrestored, Kain reaches an epiphany: he himself is the final insane Circle member, Ariel's unwitting successor as guardian of balance, culled in the brief interval between her death and the Pillars' corruption. The "cure" to vampirism which he sought is his own death.

Players can choose whether to heal the world (an ending in which Kain sacrifices his life, ensuring the extinction of the vampires and restoration of Nosgoth) or damn the world, in which case the Pillars collapse, leaving Nosgoth an irredeemable wasteland, with Kain fully embracing his curse and living on as the most powerful entity in the land. The latter choice is treated as the canon ending by the sequel, Soul Reaver.

== Development ==
Actor Simon Templeman delivered his first performance as the character of Kain.

Blood Omen originated as The Pillars of Nosgoth, a game proposal drafted circa 1993 by Silicon Knights president Denis Dyack and art director and writer Ken McCulloch. In 1993, while Silicon Knights completed work on Dark Legions, Dyack met Crystal Dynamics producer Lyle Hall at a conference, and they shared their mutual ambition to build "epic" games with bigger budgets and higher expectations than the then-current industry standard. Several publishers were sent The Pillars of Nosgoth, the science fiction concept Too Human, and a third competing Silicon Knights pitch. Too Human was almost pursued, but Crystal Dynamics—who felt that the high fantasy genre was a preferable choice—made a deal with Silicon Knights to produce The Pillars of Nosgoth. Design work continued, with Amy Hennig at the helm as design manager, for approximately six to eight months before both parties reached agreement on the most suitable video game console to publish for. Hall, who had been "instantly taken" by the project, thought that "it was obvious this game deserved a [Legend of] Zelda-style take on a vampire action RPG", and assisted Dyack in convincing Crystal Dynamics to choose the newly announced PlayStation over the 3DO Interactive Multiplayer and Sega Saturn. Dyack and Hall believed that Blood Omen could help to evolve the action role-playing genre through strong writing and artistic, cinematic flair—Dyack summarized it as a game which adults would want to play.

Central influences included vampire mythology, William Shakespeare's plays, themes of ethical dilemma in the film Unforgiven, the visceral qualities of the Necroscope novels, and the intricate plot of The Wheel of Time book series. Although antiheroes were previously uncommon in action-adventure games, Silicon Knights rejected concerns that the character of Kain was too unconventional and the story too ambitious. The developers endorsed the narrative motif, "what is evil? Perhaps it is merely a perspective", and hoped to determine how players would react in "a world where [they] had to kill innocents to survive". McCulloch, who wrote the majority of in-game texts, was urged by marketer colleagues to give characters more accessible names—he described some, such as Mortanius, as "Names from Hell", which were difficult to get past the "marketing censor". Cover art for the historical novel The Pillars of the Earth served as the inspiration behind the Pillars of Nosgoth. The Soul Reaver sword, which was originally conceived as a weapon for Too Human, was transferred to Blood Omen's fictional universe, and would become a mainstay weapon in subsequent games in the Legacy of Kain series.

The developers undertook a talent search for the game's voice cast, listening to dozens of tapes submitted by Hollywood voice actors. Before the game's voice-over was recorded, Dyack expressed concern that the actors cast would be unable to convey McCulloch's complex dialogue. He later said, however, that their performances "blew him away", commenting that "after five minutes with Simon Templeman [...] we knew that there was no problem".

Blood Omen's extended 3.5-year development period obliged Silicon Knights to double staff levels, and Crystal Dynamics flew employees to Canada to assist in their design work for over six months—this delegation was left to procure their own off-site accommodation, resulting in "great personal sacrifice". Prior to shipping, Activision and BMG Interactive reached arrangements with Crystal Dynamics to manufacture and distribute the product in various territories. In what they described as "a first in the industry", Silicon Knights added an opening credit to fully clarify that they were responsible for developing the game's concept, story, and content. "After Herculean efforts", having received promotion at the 1995 and 1996 E3 trade fairs, Blood Omen was released for the PlayStation in November 1996.

Activision and Crystal Dynamics published a Microsoft Windows port, developed by Semi Logic Entertainments, in 1997. Work on a Saturn version was also commenced by Silicon Knights after the initial release. Employees at Crystal Dynamics, including Steve Groll, stated that the Saturn version was completed but that they could not find a publisher willing to release it. The Silicon Knights website insisted that this "was simply not true" and that the Saturn version was never finished.

== Reception ==
Reception

Aggregate score
Aggregator	Score
GameRankings	83% (PS)

Review scores
Publication	Score
1Up.com	A (PS)
AllGame	4/5 (PC); 3.5/5 (PS)
Electronic Gaming Monthly	8.675/10 (PS)
GameRevolution	B+ (PC)
GameSpot	7.1/10 (PS); 7.6/10 (PC)
Hyper	80% (PS)
IGN	8.5/10 (PS)
Next Generation	4/5 (PS); 2/5
PC Gamer (US)	80 out of 100

Blood Omen was named the best game showcased at the inaugural E3 fair by DieHard GameFan in 1995. A 2011 court filing revealed that it sold at least 320,082 units historically; Silicon Knights claimed it had sold 2 million copies in its lifetime, but did not substantiate this figure. Crystal Dynamics viewed its commercial performance as "immensely successful", and remarkable for the time.

Review aggregator site GameRankings assigned the PlayStation version of the game an average rating of 83%. While critics awarded it high praise for its premise, audio, and scope, they commonly cited shortcomings in its graphics and technical aspects. Jeff Gerstmann of GameSpot appreciated its sound design and challenging gameplay, though he disapproved of its overhead perspective. IGN's staff discussed problems with the controls, but referenced the "intense story", atmosphere, and longevity of playtime as positives. Next Generation made a favorable comparison to the 1985 hack and slash game Gauntlet, remarking on Blood Omen's unique design elements, and the high production values behind its "huge and extremely gory" game world. The four reviewers of Electronic Gaming Monthly were all enthusiastic about the game, citing its morbid tone, epic length, and strong plot. GamePro remarked that "The hauntingly compelling storyline triumphs over somewhat plodding action." The reviewer elaborated that the scrolling is jerky and unpredictable, at times forcing the player to engage in blind dueling along the edge of the screen. However, he highly praised the visual impact of both the cinematics and the backgrounds. 1UP.com's staff lauded the game in their synopsis, saying it offered "the best plot of any PlayStation game to date". They acknowledged its "moody" graphics and sound design, describing its art as "beautifully rendered", and its music as "genius".

GameSpot's Greg Kasavin praised Kain as "the perfect antihero", and his story as "unique, involving, and epic in proportion", but said "the game itself doesn't quite keep up", hindered by sluggish controls and technological limitations. Despite deeming its linearity a flaw, Baldric of Game Revolution regarded the plot as intelligent and thoughtful, and commented on the game being "surprisingly amoral". Hugh Falk of PC Gamer echoed a complaint raised by both Gerstmann and Electronic Gaming Monthly that the graphics are excessively dark, and was disappointed in the artificial intelligence, but dismissed these as "minor" grievances with the conclusion that Blood Omen was an excellent entry in the role-playing genre.

The game's cinematics and voice direction were considered exceptional by many publications, particularly relative to other titles of the day. 1UP.com's writers referred to the cast as "actual talent" comparative to other actors in the medium. Some reviewers, though, described the PlayStation iteration's loading times as particularly exorbitant and unsatisfactory. Next Generation and GamePro both decried these as "noticeable and at times intrusive", while IGN rebuked them as "agonizing", but said that they are common to disc-based games, and reasonably unobtrusive in Blood Omen. Dyack rationalized the slowdown as a consequence of the PlayStation's random-access memory constraints on video data. Baldric noted in his review that the Windows port alleviated, but did not fully amend, the issue.

Next Generation reviewed the PC version of the game, and held it to be inferior to the PlayStation version, noting that the hi-res mode runs at a choppy frame rate on all but the most high-end PC hardware and arguing that the game is better played with a joypad than with a keyboard or joystick.

Electronic Gaming Monthly named Blood Omen: Legacy of Kain Role-Playing Game of the Year, explaining that, "This was a close race with Suikoden, but the dark and violent nature of Kain won. ... The excellent voice work, as well as the foreboding and violent cinemas, produced the perfect mood."

== Sequel ==
By the time Blood Omen was released, Crystal Dynamics had already secured a deal with Activision to publish a sequel. Blood Omen did receive a sequel, but its production was impeded by a litigious battle between the game's stakeholders and developer. In an interview conducted shortly after the PlayStation release, Dyack contemplated the possibility of creating a prequel centered around the character of Vorador - referring to it as part of the "Blood Omen series" - but mentioned that it was "extremely unlikely" that Silicon Knights would work with Crystal Dynamics again. Subsequently, the relationship between both parties dissolved, and Crystal Dynamics - who had withdrawn from software publishing to focus exclusively on game development - announced their own follow-up in the form of Legacy of Kain: Soul Reaver. In 1997, GameSpot divulged that Silicon Knights had filed a lawsuit against their former partner for ownership of the series, requesting an injunction to prevent Crystal Dynamics from publicizing Soul Reaver. Silicon Knights, they reported, accused Crystal Dynamics of plagiarizing their concept for a sequel.

The dispute was settled in private, with Crystal Dynamics retaining the rights to the game, and permission to create derivative work using its characters, provided they credit Silicon Knights as the developer of Blood Omen in their sequel. Crystal Dynamics was acquired by Eidos Interactive, who published Soul Reaver in 1999 to critical acclaim and commercial success. Later, it publicly emerged that Soul Reaver had never been a Silicon Knights concept. It originated as Shifter - an unrelated project inspired by Biblical mythology, devised by Crystal Dynamics' Amy Hennig and Seth Carus (both of whom had worked as designers on Blood Omen) - whose team, initially reluctantly, reworked it into a Blood Omen sequel at the request of company management. Successive titles in what was now the Legacy of Kain series were produced by Crystal Dynamics and Eidos, whereas Silicon Knights walked away from the franchise to begin work on Too Human, and later Eternal Darkness: Sanity's Requiem.

In 2012, NeoGAF member Mama Robotnik highlighted public records of the 1997 court case. During the proceedings, Silicon Knights stated that they had ceded the Blood Omen intellectual property to Crystal Dynamics under "financial duress". Among other assertions, they claimed that Crystal Dynamics had breached an agreement in late 1996 by selling certain publishing rights to the game—and any potential sequels—to Activision for $2,000,000. Silicon Knights alleged that Crystal Dynamics had failed to inform them of their intention to leave the publishing business, and had misrepresented themselves to Activision as Blood Omen's developer. The documents revealed that Activision commissioned Crystal Dynamics to develop a project codenamed "Kain II", but—dissatisfied with its quality—contracted Silicon Knights to create a competing proposal. Supposedly, Crystal Dynamics then disparaged Silicon Knights to Activision, while directly, and indirectly, approaching some of its staff to join them in working on their prototype.

When the case was resolved, control of the Legacy of Kain trademark belonged to Crystal Dynamics, and Kain II was either canceled or superseded when Shifter became Soul Reaver. Though Crystal Dynamics staff who worked on Soul Reaver declined to comment on the discovery, Dyack had previously affirmed that "[they] tried to take it over". He said that "many people ask us if we like the direction they have gone in but it is so alien to what we created it is pointless to answer now. We understand that some people love the Soul Reaver series and we think that is great. However, it is not what we would ever have done". In a 2008 interview, he elaborated his sentiment that "if you look at Legacy of Kain where it is right now -- so diluted, so dysfunctional -- as a property itself, it's pretty much gone in a completely different direction than we would have ever taken it. [...] Even if the developer's good, and I think Crystal Dynamics is not a bad developer, you get this dilution of the content, because the original author is gone".

In January 2020, Denis Dyack announced a spiritual successor to Legacy of Kain called Deadhaus Sonata, which is a free-to-play cooperative action role-playing video game.
