= X-Men: Destiny =

2011 video game

- Developers: Silicon Knights; Other Ocean Interactive (DS)
- Publisher: Activision
- Producer: Doug Heder
- Writer: Mike Carey
- Composers: Steve Henifin; Robert Baffy (DS)
- Engine: Unreal Engine 3
- Platforms: Nintendo DS, PlayStation 3, Wii, Xbox 360
- Release: Nintendo DS, PlayStation 3 & Xbox 360: NA: September 27, 2011; EU: September 30, 2011; AU: October 5, 2011; Wii: NA: September 27, 2011; EU: October 14, 2011; AU: October 26, 2011
- Genres: Beat 'em up; Action role-playing
- Mode: Single-player

X-Men: Destiny is an action role-playing video game based on the X-Men comic book series. It was developed by Silicon Knights. Written by Mike Carey, the writer of the X-Men: Legacy comic book series, it was published and released by Activision for the Nintendo DS, PlayStation 3, Wii, and Xbox 360 consoles.

Along with many other games published by Activision that had used a Marvel license, X-Men: Destiny was de-listed and subsequently removed from all digital storefronts on January 1, 2014. Due to legal issues between Silicon Knights and Epic Games over the misuse of Unreal Engine 3 code, both X-Men: Destiny and another game, Too Human, were recalled, and had their unsold copies destroyed. As such, it marks as the final game to be developed by Silicon Knights before filing for bankruptcy in 2014.

== Gameplay ==
In X-Men: Destiny, players are put in the roles of new mutants (Aimi Yoshida, daughter of X-Men contact Sunfire and sent to be under the X-Men's protection to escape Japan's increasingly violent anti-mutant campaign; Adrian Luca, the son of a deceased Purifiers leader who has been conditioned to believe mutants are evil; Grant Alexander, a UC Berkeley football player from Georgia who is unwillingly recruited by his friends to look for a 'mutant growth hormone') who choose to join either the X-Men or the Brotherhood of Mutants; from there, they make decisions for the ultimate destiny of their character. X-Men: Destiny places an emphasis on the players' freedom of choice, as opposed to a more traditional linear type of gameplay. This was supported by quotes in the official press release: "the all-new original video game casts players as new mutant recruits in a rich, branching storyline that features a deep element of choice and gives players ultimate control of their destiny".

Throughout the game, players collect power enhancements called X-Genes. Every X-Gene can unlock three types of abilities: offensive, defensive and utility. X-Genes can be mixed and matched as the player sees fit for a unique experience.

Some retailers packaged the game with exclusive pre-order bonuses. Those who pre-ordered on Amazon.com received an early unlock code for Emma Frost's outfit and X-Genes; Best Buy offered an early unlock code of Juggernaut's costume and X-Genes; and GameStop's pre-ordering customers received Havok's suit and X-Genes.

== Plot ==
In X-Men Destiny San Francisco has been divided into human and mutant areas due to conflict. The player chooses from one of three mutant characters who have been created for the game: Aimi Yoshida, Adrian Luca or Grant Alexander (voiced by Jamie Chung, Scott Porter and Milo Ventimiglia respectively). Player choices affect which mutants become their allies and enemies through decisions made in the course of the story.

The game begins at a peace rally in memory of the deceased Professor X, seen through the Mutant Response Division's Chief Luis Reyes. Things quickly turn when the rally is attacked by an anti-mutant extremist group called the Purifiers, who are kidnapping mutants, not killing them as they usually do. The latent mutant powers of the player character are awakened, and they are forced to defend civilians from the Purifiers. The player character then meets with mutants from both the X-Men and Brotherhood of Mutants and chooses to join a group as they go after Cameron Hodge, leader of the Purifiers. Hodge is wearing a suit of power armor and personally joins the hunt for mutants. The player eventually corners Hodge on top of a building but is interrupted by Magneto, accused by Reyes of attacking the rally, who drops the Golden Gate Bridge on top of the combat zone.

The player character is saved by Nightcrawler at the last second and is teleported to Chinatown, where they are tasked with finding Gambit, who is currently operating a nightclub nearby. After meeting Gambit, he asks the player to help him raid a Purifier warehouse which contains technology used against mutants. After the raid, Gambit gives the player character the location of the secret underground lab where Purifiers hold captured mutants. At the lab, the player character meets several captured mutants such as Quicksilver, Surge and Colossus. With their help John Sublime and the U-Men are defeated, and the captured mutants are rescued. Acting on information gained by the X-Men, the player character goes to a secret underground base used by Hodge and the Purifiers. They find Hodge, who is now wearing a more powerful power armor containing drained mutant powers. Hodge boasts that the powers drained from Pixie and Caliban will allow him to find any mutant, and that he is being helped by some other group or person. After the fight, Hodge falls from a generator tower to his apparent death.

Depending on the player's choice between the X-Men or the Brotherhood of Mutants, they go to either Cyclops or Mystique with the new-found information and are tasked with finding Pixie and Caliban. With the aid of Forge, the player character finds Caliban and realizes that Hodge's ally is Bastion, the robot who killed Professor X before being destroyed by Magneto. Bastion somehow survived and uploaded himself to the MRD satellite, and even Reyes is working for him. With Caliban's help, the player character finds Pixie. Still, the helicopter carrying her is shot down by a laser beam and crashes, killing her. Immediately after, regardless of the player's choices so far, Magneto accuses Cyclops of shooting down the helicopter and, alongside Juggernaut, attacks both Cyclops and the player. After the fight, Magneto grudgingly gives the player character a chance to join the Brotherhood, and they are forced to make an important decision.

Regardless of which side the player chooses, they are tasked to take down Reyes, who seems to have mind control powers. Reyes plans to amplify his power with Bastion's satellite so he can control all humans and mutants on Earth. After fighting several allied mutants and saving them from Reyes' mind control, the player finds the broadcasting tower used by Reyes and shuts down the signal with the aid of Cyclops and Magneto. Bastion downloads himself into Reyes, now wearing an enormous version of Hodge's armor, and takes control of his mind. Bastion also sends several Sentinels to join the fight. After the player brings down Bastion and his Sentinels, Reyes surrenders himself to the authorities, to which the player character responds that they are the authorities now.

The ending depends on which side the player chose to join at the end of Chapter 7.

- If they sided with the X-Men, Cyclops, the player character, and the X-Men are seen watching over the ruins of San Francisco. They promise to create a world where mutants and humans can live together in peace. Cyclops says that there is another storm coming that might be worse than the ones they have already endured.
- If they sided with the Brotherhood, Magneto and the player character are seen watching over the ruins of San Francisco. Magneto declares the formation of a mutant-only nation, and he states that he will teach the player how to survive in a world that despises mutants.

== Development ==
Silicon Knights developed the game in collaboration with Activision after being green-lighted in 2009. Anonymous sources claiming to be former employees have said that the development team was split between X-Men: Destiny and Eternal Darkness 2, with management indifferent towards the former.

Denis Dyack, the founder of Silicon Knights, replied that the project budget was drastically reduced due to Marvel's ongoing acquisition by Disney. He has asserted that the perception of indifference had to do with resources at the developer being re-allocated in response to the shift in budget; the developers were not informed of the reduced budget so as to maintain morale. To remedy this, Silicon Knights spent $2 million of their own money to finish the project, which stunned Activision; on the record, Dyack admitted that this was a mistake. He also admitted in 2019 that he was not heavily involved with the development of X-Men: Destiny as he was distracted by the lawsuit against Epic Games.

In 2022, assistant director Julian Spillane revealed that one of the reasons why X-Men: Destiny failed was a general apathy among the developers towards respecting the lore of X-Men. For example, when he pointed out that the boss fight with the Juggernaut was inaccurate because the character is physically invincible in the comics and can only be harmed by psychic attacks, his superiors told him not to focus on "unimportant details." When they submitted the build to the publishers for approval, Marvel's reply was to mail the team free copies of their comic encyclopedias, a clear rebuke for how the characters and world were written. Spillane also explained that due to the lawsuits with Epic Games, the developers had to use their own internal engine which was considered inferior to Unreal Engine 3.

== Reception ==
Reception

Aggregate scores
Aggregator	Score
GameRankings	(PS3) 50.90% (X360) 48.47% (Wii) 40.44% (DS) 32.50%
Metacritic	(PS3) 50/100 (X360) 47/100 (Wii) 36/100 (DS) 33/100

Review scores
Publication	Score
Destructoid	2.5/10
Eurogamer	5/10
Game Informer	7/10
GamePro	2.5/5
GameSpot	4/10 (Wii) 3/10
GameTrailers	5.5/10
Giant Bomb	2/5
IGN	5.5/10 (Wii) 3.5/10 (DS) 2/10
Joystiq	1.5/5
Nintendo Power	(Wii) 2.5/10 (DS) 2/10
Official Xbox Magazine (US)	5.5/10
The Digital Fix	3/10
The Escapist	1.5/5

X-Men: Destiny received generally negative reviews, with most pointing out the button mashing combat, lack of consequences to choices, and overall lack of polish. GameRankings and Metacritic gave it a score of 32.50% and 33 out of 100 for the DS version; 50.90% and 50 out of 100 for the PlayStation 3 version; 48.47% and 47 out of 100 for the Xbox 360 version; and 40.44% and 36 out of 100 for the Wii version.

Joystiq (now a part of Engadget) criticized the sluggish gameplay and short story, stating the game feels unfinished and gave the Xbox 360 version 1.5 stars out of 5, ending the review with, "...at least you can quickly move onto something more pleasurable, like...burying a beloved family pet". GamesRadar, although praising the fan service of the game, echoed the sentiment of the game feeling unfinished, calling it mediocre and citing the graphics being similar to "an HD remake of a last-gen game" and although the boss battles received some praise, the majority of the fighting was considered dull and repetitive, awarding the game 2.5 stars out of 5. However, Game Informer gave the game a 7 out of 10. They praised the fulfillment of fantasy for mutant lovers that this game provides, as well as replay value, despite the questionable graphics.
