= Battle Scars (film) =

- Directed by: Danny Buday
- Written by: Danny Buday
- Produced by: Danny Buday; Heather McComb; George Young Warner; Lane Carlson
- Starring: Zane Holtz; Heather McComb; Ryan Eggold; Fairuza Balk; David James Elliott
- Cinematography: Jason Oldak
- Edited by: Waldemar Centeno
- Music by: Teho Teardo
- Production companies: Virtu Entertainment; Ad Lucem Entertainment
- Distributed by: Gravitas Ventures
- Release date: July 14, 2017
- Running time: 94 minutes
- Country: United States
- Language: English

Battle Scars is a 2017 American war drama film written and directed by Danny Buday and starring Zane Holtz, Heather McComb, Ryan Eggold, Fairuza Balk and David James Elliott.

== Cast ==
- Zane Holtz as Luke Stephens
- Heather McComb as Michelle
- Fairuza Balk as Rifka
- David James Elliott as Frank Stephens
- Ryan Eggold as Nicky Stephens
- Jamal Woolard as Dre
- Kristen Renton as Summer
- Amy Davidson as Jules Stephens

== Release ==
The film was released in theaters and on VOD on July 14, 2017.

== Reception ==
The film has a 13% rating on Rotten Tomatoes based on eight reviews. Gary Goldstein of the Los Angeles Times gave the film a negative review and wrote, "Given writer-director Danny Buday’s apparent concern for the emotional and physical plight of returning veterans, this combo-plate approach feels especially off-base." Frank Scheck of The Hollywood Reporter gave the film a negative review and wrote, "Featuring that most hackneyed of settings, a strip club, Battle Scars is neither sensitive nor gripping enough to be taken seriously." Bobby LePire of Film Threat graded the film a D+.
