= Deadhaus Sonata =

- Developer: Apocalypse Studios
- Publisher: Apocalypse Studios
- Director: Denis Dyack
- Composer: Steve Cupani
- Engine: Unreal Engine 5
- Platform: Microsoft Windows
- Release: WW: May 14, 2026 (early access)
- Genres: Action role-playing, hack and slash
- Modes: Single-player, multiplayer

Deadhaus Sonata is an upcoming free-to-play cooperative action role-playing video game developed by Apocalypse Studios and directed by Denis Dyack. The game is set to be released for Microsoft Windows, with plans to also release to home consoles in the future. In Deadhaus Sonata, players play undead classes in the House of the Dead and fight the living. Deadhaus Sonata focuses on its gameplay pillars of procedural generation, narrative driven design and cooperative asymmetric gameplay, as well as looting and fast-action combat.

An early access version was released for Windows in May 14, 2026.

== Gameplay ==
Deadhaus Sonata is an online action role-playing game, where the player controls a single character from a third-person perspective, alone or with up to five other people. The player will fight hordes of enemies, collecting large amounts of loot, and fulfilling quests to gain experience points and more equipment. To increase re-playability, the game's levels are procedurally generated.

Players can choose from seven available classes to play as; Vampires, Revenants, Liches, Ghouls, Wraiths, Wights, and Banshees. Each of these classes are aligned with one to three of the core attributes of the House of the Dead: Physical, Magickal, and Essential. Dyack has titled this 'the Trinary Archetype System', mentioning that many themes in Deadhaus Sonata will be influenced by the balance of these attributes in the world. Classes more aligned with Physical damage will be more effective at melee and non-magickal ranged damage. Magickal-aligned classes are more specialized in spellcasting, and essential-aligned classes are focused on the use of Artifacts, objects that have gained sentience from supernatural beings possessing them. Each class will have their own unique skill tree, allowing for specializing into different class archetypes. Apocalypse has also said that crafting equipment will play a large role in the game, but they have yet to be specific on how much.

Deadhaus Sonata will be free-to-play with microtransactions, using the in-game currency, 'bones'. Apocalypse Studios has stated the game will have entirely ethical monetization, avoiding all pay-to-win aspects, referencing games like Path of Exile and their strictly cosmetic microtransaction system.

== Setting ==
Deadhaus Sonata takes place in the Gothic and Lovecraftian world of Nogosaua. The house of the Dead has been created in a cosmic war between two Elder Gods, and the Dead must discover what has brought them back and what their purpose is. In Nogosaua, there are many houses beyond Deadhaus, and a large amount of the story in Deadhaus Sonata will be about the rival between the houses. Being a narrative-driven game, Deadhaus Sonata is influenced heavily by the works of H. P. Lovecraft, Steven Erikson, and Thomas Ligotti.

== Development ==
=== Pre-release ===
Deadhaus Sonata was announced on IGN on October 24, 2018. Dyack has referenced in many instances his inspirations for Deadhaus Sonata being his previous games, saying his team would combine parts of several of his past projects into the game such as "Lovecraftian overtones from Eternal Darkness: Sanity's Requiem, the Gothic role-playing elements of Blood Omen: Legacy of Kain, where you are undead, and finally, some of the action RPG elements of Too Human". In an interview with VentureBeat, Dyack stated Deadhaus Sonata has a "10-year rollout cycle where we're believing in the community", once again stating Apocalypse' want to keep community-driven design a major part of the games' production.

The studio initially developed the game using Amazon Lumberyard, but later switched to Open 3D Engine because of its professional graphics quality and support for customizations that improve the game's capabilities. The game switched to using Unity in April 2022 but in January 2026, it was announced that the game is now using Unreal Engine 5.
