= Robert Picardo =

American actor (born 1953)

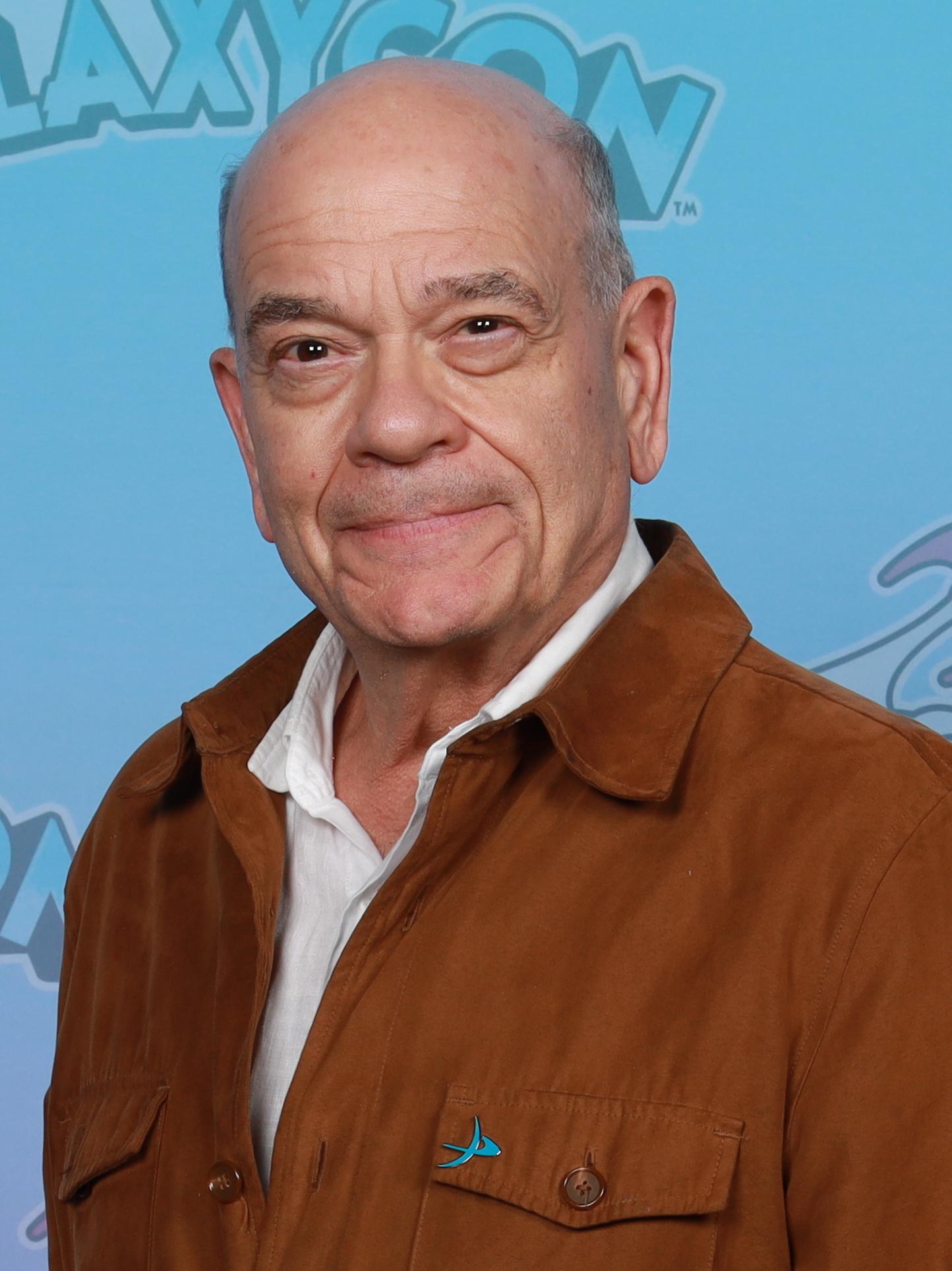
- Picardo at GalaxyCon San Jose in 2024
- Born: Robert Alphonse Picardo; October 27, 1953 (age 72); Philadelphia, Pennsylvania, U.S.
- Education: Yale University (BA)
- Occupations: Actor; singer
- Years active: 1975–present
- Spouse: Linda Pawlik (m. 1984; div. 2014)
- Children: 2
- Website: www.robertpicardo.com

Robert Alphonse Picardo (born October 27, 1953) is an American actor. He is best known for playing The Doctor in the Star Trek franchise, starting on Star Trek: Voyager. He also appeared as Richard Woolsey in the Stargate franchise, the Cowboy in Innerspace, Coach Cutlip on The Wonder Years, and Captain Dick Richard on the ABC series China Beach. He is a frequent collaborator with Joe Dante and is a member of The Planetary Society's board of directors.

== Early life ==
Picardo was born in Philadelphia, Pennsylvania, the son of Joe Picardo. Robert is of Italian heritage, with his father's family originating from Montecorvino Rovella, Salerno, and his mother's parents originally from Bomba in Abruzzo. He graduated from William Penn Charter School in 1971 and originally entered Yale University as a pre-medical student, but opted to act, instead. He graduated with a bachelor's degree in drama from Yale.

Picardo is an accomplished singer. While he was at Yale University, he was a member of the Society of Orpheus and Bacchus, the second-longest running undergraduate a cappella group in the United States. Also, while at Yale, he had a major role in the 1973 European premiere production of Leonard Bernstein's Mass in Vienna, conducted by John Mauceri. The production was televised by ORF and broadcast on PBS during the 1970s. His singing was also incorporated into his role in Star Trek: Voyager.

After earning his degree, he enrolled at the Circle in the Square Professional Theater Workshop. He waited tables for a few years until his theatrical work started to take off around 1976. His first breaks were appearing in the David Mamet play Sexual Perversity in Chicago, and with Diane Keaton in The Primary English Class.

== Career ==
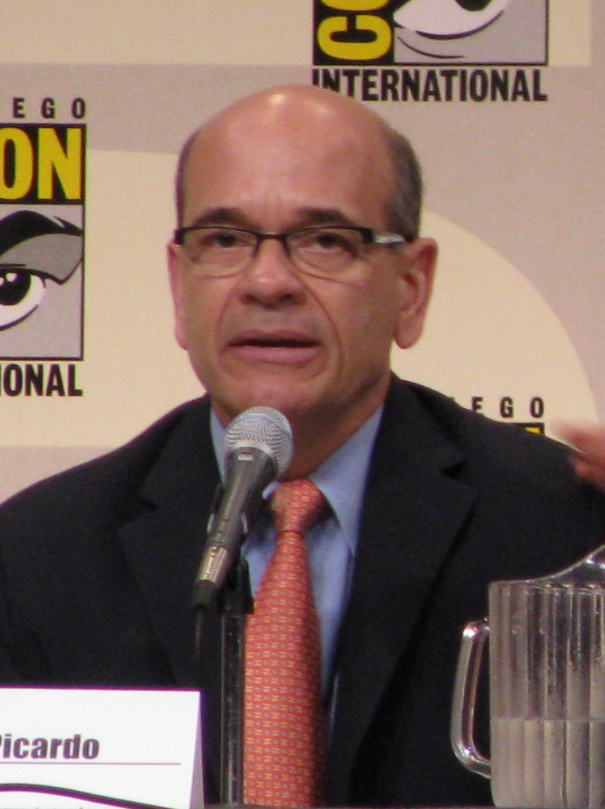
Picardo at ComicCon, 2008.

In 1977, Picardo made his Broadway debut, appearing in Gemini (1977) and Tribute (1978).

On television, Picardo appeared on Kojak in a 1977 episode and Taxi in a 1979 episode. He made his feature-film debut as Eddie Quist, the serial killer werewolf in the Joe Dante film The Howling (1981). He also had a recurring role in the sitcom Alice and played a doctor on an episode of The Golden Girls.

He played a number of roles in Dante's family science fiction film Explorers (1985), and later appeared in Dante's Innerspace (1987), The 'Burbs (1989), Gremlins 2: The New Batch (1990), Matinee (1993), Small Soldiers (1998), and Looney Tunes: Back in Action (2003). Picardo often plays roles under layers of prosthetic latex, having also played the swamp-dwelling Meg Mucklebones in Ridley Scott's film Legend (1985). He also had a small role as a funeral director in John Landis's Amazon Women on the Moon (1987). Picardo also portrayed the voice and face of the robotic Johnny Cab in Total Recall (1990).

During the 1988–1991 television seasons, Picardo was simultaneously seen on the ABC Vietnam series China Beach in the role of Dr. Dick Richard, and the ABC series The Wonder Years in the role of Coach Cutlip. He is among a small group of television actors to achieve notice on two television series at the same time.

In 1993, Picardo had a brief role as Joe "the Meat Man" Morton, a butcher and neighbor to Tim Allen's character on the sitcom Home Improvement. He also appeared in one episode of ER in 1995 as Abraham Zimble (Season 2 - Episode 6, "Days Like This"). That same year, he voiced Pfish in two Pfish & Chip shorts as seen on Cartoon Network's What-A-Cartoon! Show.

=== Star Trek ===
From 1995 to 2001, he played the role of the Emergency Medical Hologram (EMH) in the television series Star Trek: Voyager. Before being accepted for this role, Picardo initially auditioned for the role of Neelix. He later also directed two episodes. In the series, his character finally chose the name "Joe", after both the name of his wife's grandfather and Picardo's own father.

He played additional copies of the role of the EMH in the 1996 film Star Trek: First Contact and the 1997 Star Trek: Deep Space Nine episode "Doctor Bashir, I Presume?". He also played Dr. Lewis Zimmerman, the creator of the EMH, in episodes of Deep Space Nine and Voyager.

In 2002, Picardo authored The Hologram's Handbook, published by Pocket Books.

In 2007 and 2008, Star Trek: The Music was a multicity tour in which he performed with John de Lancie. Picardo and de Lancie narrated around the orchestral performance, explaining the history of the music in Star Trek.

In 2015, Picardo reprised the role of Dr. Lewis Zimmerman in the pilot episode of the fan series Star Trek: Renegades.

In 2024, he reprised the role of the EMH in the second season of Star Trek: Prodigy, and also appears as The Doctor in Star Trek: Starfleet Academy.

=== Stargate ===
In 2004, he began playing the recurring role of International Oversight Advisory member Richard Woolsey in both Stargate SG-1 and Stargate Atlantis. His first appearance in those series was in the Stargate SG-1 episode "Heroes (Part 2)".

On February 5, 2008, Picardo was announced to be joining the regular cast of Stargate Atlantis full-time for the series' fifth and final season. He took over the role of mission commander of the Atlantis Expedition.

=== Later career ===
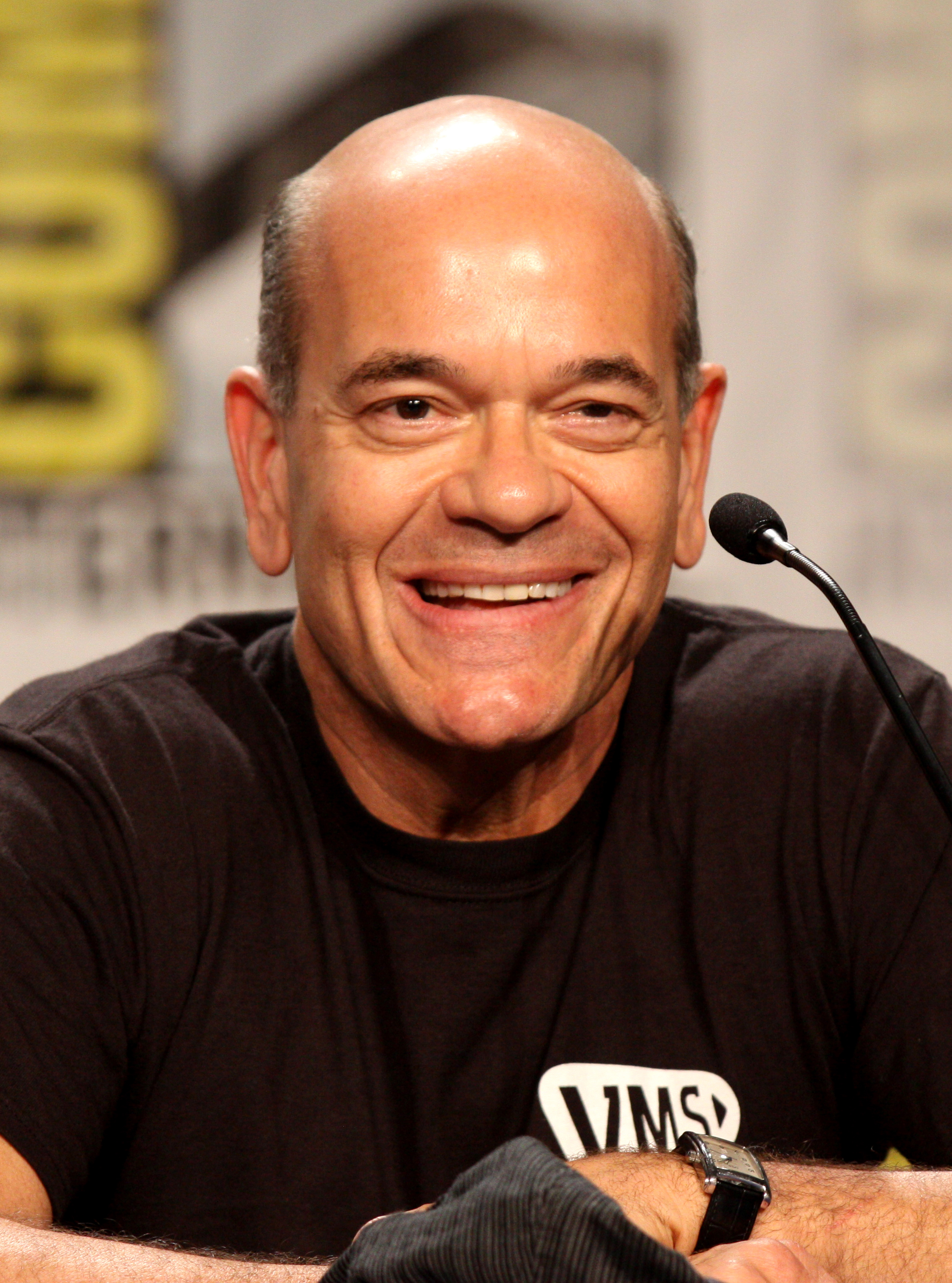
Picardo at the 2011 San Diego Comic Con

In 2001, Picardo guest-starred in the 7 Days episode "Revelation", purporting to be a time traveler from seven years in the future.

In 2007, he played Principal White in Ben 10: Race Against Time, and starred in the independent feature film by director Russ Emanuel, P.J., alongside John Heard and Vincent Pastore. He also starred in Russ Emanuel's Chasing the Green in 2008, with William Devane, Jeremy London and Ryan Hurst.

Picardo appeared on four episodes of E-Ring, as an enraged father in Cold Case, and as a police officer in CSI: NY. He was a recurring guest star in two episodes of season seven of Smallville, and appeared on a season-six episode of Supernatural titled "Clap Your Hands if You Believe", as a leprechaun.

Outside of acting, Picardo was a member of the Board of Directors' Advisory Council of The Planetary Society from 1999 through 2015. Beginning in 2015, he was elected to serve on the board itself.

Picardo's other career highlights include performing in Leonard Bernstein's Mass during its European debut tour, performing with the Yale University Society of Orpheus & Bacchus a cappella singing group as an undergraduate, and dozens of other television and film roles, including the film Our Last Days as Children.

Picardo provided the voice of Loki in the Xbox 360 video game Too Human. In 2009, he appeared in Pushing Daisies, Chuck, and Castle, and had the lead role in the independent psychological thriller film Sensored. In 2010, he had a cameo in the final episode of Persons Unknown, as a member of "the program"'s governing board. He also voiced Robert McNamara in the video game Call of Duty: Black Ops. He appeared in four episodes of The Mentalist from 2012 through 2013 as Jason Cooper, a lieutenant of cult leader Bret Styles.

In May 2014, Cartoon Hangover announced Picardo as a guest voice actor in the second season of Bravest Warriors, in the episode "The Parasox Pub".

In 2017, Picardo played Lt. Kitan's father Prof. Ildis Kitan in the first-season episode of The Orville titled "Firestorm", and reprised the role in the 2019 episode "Home" together with John Billingsley, who played Doctor Phlox in Star Trek: Enterprise.

Picardo appeared as himself in an episode of Schooled.

== Filmography ==
=== Film ===
Year	Title	Role	Notes
1981	The Howling	Eddie Quist	
1983	Star 80	Interviewer	
1983	Get Crazy	O'Connell	
1984	Oh, God! You Devil	Joe Ortiz	
1985	Explorers	Starkiller / Wak / Wak and Neek's Father	
1985	Legend	Meg Mucklebones	
1986	Back to School	Giorgio	
1987	Munchies	Bob Marvalle	
1987	Innerspace	The Cowboy	
1987	Amazon Women on the Moon	Rick Raddnitz (segment "Roast Your Loved One")	
1988	Jack's Back	Dr. Carlos Battera	
1988	Dead Heat	Lieutenant Herzog	
1988	976-EVIL	Mark Dark	
1989	The 'Burbs	Garbageman	
1989	Loverboy	Dr. Reed Palmer	
1990	Total Recall	Johnnycab	Voice and likeness
1990	Gremlins 2: The New Batch	Forster	Nominated–Saturn Award for Best Supporting Actor
1991	L.A. Story	Voicephone	Voice, uncredited
1991	Frame Up	Frank Govers	
1991	Samantha	Neil Otto / Mr. Samantha	
1991	Motorama	Jerry	
1993	Matinee	Howard	
1994	Wagons East	Ben Wheeler	
1994	The Pagemaster	Pirate	Voice
1996	Star Trek: First Contact	Holographic Doctor	
1997	Menno's Mind	Senator Taylor	
1998	Small Soldiers	Ralph	
2000	The Amati Girls	Grace's Doctor	
2002	Until Morning	Brad Scott	
2003	Looney Tunes: Back in Action	Acme VP, Rhetorical Questions	
2008	Universal Signs	Father Joe	
2009	Chasing the Green	Dave Foxx	
2010	Quantum Quest: A Cassini Space Odyssey	Milton	Voice
2010	Mega Shark Versus Crocosaurus	Admiral Calvin	Direct-to-video
2011	Beethoven's Christmas Adventure	Smirch	Direct-to-video
2012	Camilla Dickinson	Mr. Stephanowski	
2012	Atlas Shrugged: Part II	Dr. Robert Stadler	
2014	Don't Blink	Man in Black	
2015	Star Trek: Renegades	Dr. Lewis Zimmerman	
2015	The Meddler	Cos	
2016	Hail, Caesar!	Rabbi	
2016	Unbelievable!!!!!	Boris, Dr. Nontu Soon, Award Show Presenter	
2018	Buttons: A Christmas Tale	Mr. Wentworth	
2022	MEAD	Admiral Gillette	
2022	Confess, Fletch	Count Clementi Arbogastes De Grassi	
2024	Space Command Redemption	Yusef Sekander	
2025	Werewolf Game	Bill	
2028	Gremlins 3	Forster	

=== Television ===
Year	Title	Role	Notes
1977	Kojak	Thomas Rindone	2 episodes
1979	Taxi	Philip Polevoy	Episode: "Nardo Loses Her Marbles"
1980	The Dream Merchants	Mark Kessler	2 episodes
1982	Silver Spoons	Louis Morgan	Episode: "Pilot"
1982–1984	Alice	Freddie, Officer Maxwell	8 episodes
1983	Archie Bunker's Place	Larry Burnett	Episode: "Captain Video"
1983	It Takes Two	Chad Hunter	Episode: "Looks Bad, Feels Good"
1983	The Other Woman	Chuchi	TV movie
1984	Steambath	Rod Tandy	6 episodes
1986	The Golden Girls	Doctor Revell	Episode: "The Operation"
1986	Benson	Richard Alan Tracy	Episode: "Reel Murder: Part 1"
1986	Hardcastle and McCormick	Manny	Episode: "Brother, Can You Spare a Crime?"
1986	Amazing Stories	Tony Sepulveda	Episode: "Boo!"
1986	Scarecrow and Mrs. King	Randall Skylar	Episode: "Three Little Spies"
1986	Throb	Todd	Episode: "Pilot"
1987	Roses Are for the Rich	Durant	TV movie
1987	21 Jump Street	Ralph Buckley	Episode: "Gotta Finish the Riff"
1987	The Man Who Fell to Earth	Agent Richard Morse	TV movie
1987	Bates Motel	Dr. Goodman	TV movie
1987	Private Eye	Eddie Rosen	Episode: "Pilot"
1987	Mr. President	Reinbeck	Episode: "Armageddon Kinda Sore"
1987	St. Elsewhere	Eli Muzzy	Episode: "Weigh In, Way Out"
1987, 1991	L.A. Law	John Dunphy	2 episodes
1988–1991	The Wonder Years	Coach Cutlip	15 episodes Nominated—Primetime Emmy Award for Outstanding Guest Actor in a Comedy Series; Nominated—Viewers for Quality Television Award for Best Specialty Player
1988–1991	China Beach	Dr. Dick Richard	54 episodes Nominated—Viewers for Quality Television Award for Best Supporting Actor in a Quality Drama Series (1990–91)
1989	The Cover Girl and the Cop	Denise's Date	TV movie
1989	Newhart	Terry	Episode: "The Little Match Girl"
1992	CBS Schoolbreak Special	Paul Lance	Episode: "Two Teens and a Baby"
1992	Capitol Critters	Additional voices	Episode: "The KiloWatts Riots"
1992	The Witches of Eastwick	Raymond Gentry	TV movie
1992	The Powers That Be	Larry Yablonsky	Episode: "Sophie's Big Decision"
1992–1993	Dinosaurs	Ted, Muse, Clerk	Voice, 3 episodes
1993	Batman: The Animated Series	Eddie G.	Voice, episode: "The Man Who Killed Batman"
1993	The Adventures of Brisco County, Jr.	Puel	Episode: "The Orb Scholar"
1993	Home Improvement	Joe Morton	2 episodes
1993	Fatal Deception: Mrs. Lee Harvey Oswald	David Lifton	TV movie
1993	Tales from the Crypt	Frank Bobo	Episode: "Till Death Do We Part"
1994	Revenge of the Nerds IV: Nerds in Love	Chad Penrod	TV movie
1994	White Mile	Tom Horton	TV movie
1994	Rebel Highway	Mr. Ed Cahn	Episode: "Runaway Daughters"
1995	ER	Abraham Zimble	Episode: "Days Like This"
1995	Dumb and Dumber	Colonel Drab, Control Tower Voice, Chief, Cook	Voice, 2 episodes
1995, 1997	What a Cartoon!	Pfish	Voice, 2 episodes
1995–2001	Star Trek: Voyager	The Doctor, Dr. Lewis Zimmerman	172 episodes Nominated—Saturn Award for Best Supporting Actor on Television
1996	The Savage Dragon	Additional voices	13 episodes
1997	Star Trek: Deep Space Nine	Dr. Lewis Zimmerman	Episode: "Doctor Bashir, I Presume?"
1997	The Second Civil War	Godfrey	TV movie
1997	Early Edition	Doctor	Episode: "Faith"
1998	The Outer Limits	Emmet Harley	Episode: "Sarcophagus"
1998	Cow and Chicken	President, Narrator	Voice, episode: "101 Uses for Cow and Chicken"
1999	Ally McBeal	Barry Philbrick	Episode: "Love's Illusions"
2000	Buzz Lightyear of Star Command	Professor Reddschift	Voice, episode: "First Missions"
2001	Seven Days	Maj. Michael McGrath	Episode: "Revelation"
2001	Frasier	Charlie Koechner	Episode: "Bully for Martin"
2002	Crossing Jordan	Father Bruno Casnelli	Episode: "Miracles & Wonders"
2002	The Grim Adventures of Billy & Mandy	Cod Commando	Voice, episode: "The Pie Who Loved Me"
2002	The Practice	Dr. Edmunds	Episode: "Neighboring Species"
2002–2003	Justice League	Blackhawk, Amazo	Voice, 4 episodes
2003	Sabrina, the Teenage Witch	Bob Jacobs	2 episodes
2003	The Dead Zone	Mitch McMurty	Episode: "The Storm"
2003	The Lyon's Den	Det. Nick Traub	7 episodes
2004	The West Wing	E. Bradford Shelton	Episode: "The Supremes"
2004	Justice League Unlimited	Amazo	Voice, 2 episodes
2004–2007	Stargate SG-1	Richard Woolsey	7 episodes
2005	The 4400	Trent Appelbaum	Episode: "Weight of the World"
2005	Masters of Horror	Kurt Rand	Episode: "Homecoming"
2005–2006	E-Ring	Larry Kincaid	4 episodes
2006	The O.C.	Bill Merriam	Episode: "The Pot Stirrer"
2006	Eve	Professor Dunson	Episode: "To Sir, with Mom"
2006	Ben 10	Leader Alien	Voice, episode: "The Big Tick"
2006–2009	Stargate: Atlantis	Richard Woolsey	26 episodes
2007	Cold Case	Arthur Lennox	Episode: "Knuckle Up"
2007	The Closer	Mr. Sheffield	Episode: "Saving Face"
2007	CSI: NY	Sheriff Benson	Episode "Boo"
2007	Women's Murder Club	Allen Douglas	Episode: "Grannies, Guns and Love Mints"
2007	Ben 10: Race Against Time	Principal White	TV movie
2008	Smallville	Edward Teague	2 episodes
2009	Chuck	Dr. Howard Busgang	Episode: "Chuck Versus the Lethal Weapon"
2009	Pushing Daisies	Detective Puget	Episode: "Water & Power"
2009–2010	Castle	Dr. Clark Murray	2 episodes
2010	Justified	Karl Hanselman	Episode: "The Collection"
2010	Persons Unknown	Silver-Haired Man	Episode: "Shadows in the Cave"
2010	Monsterwolf	Stark	TV movie
2010	Supernatural	Wayne Whittaker Jr.	Episode: "Clap Your Hands If You Believe"
2011	No Ordinary Family	Vice Principal Nance	Episode: "No Ordinary Animal"
2011	Stargate Universe	Richard Woolsey	Episode: "Seizure"
2011	United States of Tara	Dr. Smolow	Episode: "Bryce Will Play"
2011	NTSF:SD:SUV	Damian	Episode: "Twistin' the Night Away"
2012	Harry's Law	Annie's Psychiatrist	Episode: "Gorilla My Dreams"
2012	Body of Proof	Henry Pedroni	Episode: "Cold Blooded"
2012	Femme Fatales	Hieronymus Hawks	Episode: "Bad Science"
2012	Austin & Ally	Dr. Grant	Episode: "Successes & Setbacks"
2012–2013	The Mentalist	Jason Cooper	4 episodes
2013	Happy Endings	Mr. Logan	Episode: "The Marry Prankster"
2013	The Client List	Judge Hughes	Episode: "My Main Trial Is Yet to Come"
2013	Jessie	Cyril Lipton	Episode: "To Be or Not to Be Me"
2013	Hawaii Five-0	CIA Agent	Episode: "Olelo Pa'a"
2013	Perception	A.Z. Weyland	Episode: "Alienation"
2014	Bones	Dr. Lawrence Rozran	Episode: "The Heiress in the Hill"
2015	Aquarius	Neil Jacobs	Episode: "A Whiter Shade of Pale"
2015	Significant Mother	Dr. Robert Richter	Episode: "Who's Your Daddy?"
2016	Suspense	Arnold Keene	Episode: "The Shadow on the Screen"
2016	Lucifer	Yuri	Episode: "Lady Parts"
2016	Salem	Mr. Stoughton	Episode: "Night's Black Agents"
2017	The Good Fight	Alan Mannheim	Episode: "First Week"
2017	Justice League Action	Harvey Dent / Two-Face	Voice, episode: "Double Cross"
2017	The Last Tycoon	Leopold Ferber	Episode: "Eine Kleine Reichmusik"
2017–2018	Grey's Anatomy	Mr. Nelligan	2 episodes
2017, 2019	The Orville	Ildis Kitan	2 episodes
2019	Schooled	Himself	Episode: "Money for RENT"
2019	Hot Streets	The Concierge	Voice, episode: "The Moon Masters"
2019	The Flash	Dexter Myles	2 episodes
2019	The Code	Col. Zugler	2 episodes
2019–2021	Dickinson	Ithamar Conkey	10 episodes
2020	Space Command	Yusef Sekander	3 episodes
2020	Station 19	Mr. Nelligan	Episode: "Nothing Seems the Same"
2020	The Family Business	Bernie	2 episodes
2021	Deck the Heart	Larry Link	TV movie
2022	CSI: Vegas	Carlo Rey	Episode: "Burned"
2022	Mythic Quest	Principal Taggart	Episode: Sarian
2023	NCIS	Dale Harding	Episode: "Too Many Cooks"
2023	Quantum Leap	Dr. Edwin Woolsey	Episode: "Leap. Die. Repeat."
2023	A Biltmore Christmas	Harold Balaban	TV movie
2024	Star Trek: Prodigy	The Doctor	17 episodes
2024	Young Sheldon	Professor Salzman	Episode: "A Roulette Wheel and a Piano Playing Dog"
2026	Star Trek: Starfleet Academy	The Doctor	4 episodes

=== Video games ===
Year	Title	Role	Notes
2000	Star Trek: Voyager – Elite Force	Emergency Medical Hologram	
2007	Pirates of the Caribbean: At World's End	Singapore Townsfolk	
2008	Too Human	Loki	
2010	Star Trek Online	The Doctor	
2010	Call of Duty: Black Ops	Robert McNamara	Also motion capture
2012	Call of Duty: Black Ops II	Erik Breighner	Also motion capture
~~2013~~	Hellraid	Adon	Project commenced 2012, announced for 2013 release, cancelled 2015
2015	Call of Duty: Black Ops III	Shadowman, Sebastian Krueger, Robert McNamara	Also motion capture for Sebastian Krueger
2015	Fallout 4	Alan Binet, Vault-Tech Scientist	
2018	Call of Duty: Black Ops 4	Robert McNamara, Shadowman	Appears in Blood of the Dead

=== Web series ===
Year	Title	Role	Notes
2013	Untitled Web Series About a Space Traveler Who Can Also Travel Through Time	Bernard	Episode: "Second Season Prequel"
2014–2018	Bravest Warriors	Puddingtown, Eyeball	Voice, 7 episodes
