= Metal Gear Solid: The Twin Snakes =

2004 video game

- North American cover art
- Developers: Konami Computer Entertainment Japan; Silicon Knights
- Publisher: Konami
- Director: Carey Murray
- Producers: Hideo Kojima; Yoshikazu Matsuhana; Denis Dyack
- Designer: Hideo Kojima
- Programmers: Doug Tooley; James O'Riley; Richard Barnes; Carey Murray
- Artist: Yoji Shinkawa
- Writers: Hideo Kojima; Tomokazu Fukushima
- Composers: Norihiko Hibino; Steve Henifin; Toshiyuki Kakuta; Shuichi Kobori; Waichiro Ozaki
- Series: Metal Gear
- Platform: GameCube
- Release: NA: March 9, 2004; JP: March 11, 2004; EU: March 26, 2004
- Genres: Action-adventure, stealth
- Mode: Single-player

Metal Gear Solid: The Twin Snakes (Note: Japanese: メタルギアソリッド ザ・ツインスネークス, Hepburn: Metaru Gia Soriddo Za Tsuin Sunēkusu) is a 2004 action-adventure stealth game developed by Konami and Silicon Knights and published by Konami for the GameCube. It is a remake of 1998's Metal Gear Solid.

The Twin Snakes features graphical improvements over the original, new cutscenes written and directed by Ryuhei Kitamura, and gameplay functions originally introduced in the sequel Metal Gear Solid 2: Sons of Liberty. The game includes a revised translation with re-recorded voice acting, using almost all of the original English voice cast. The game was met with positive reception from critics, with praise towards the graphics and presentation, though with criticisms towards the framerate and the addition of gameplay mechanics from Sons of Liberty.

== Gameplay ==
Snake fires at Gray Fox from a first-person perspective.

Serving as a remake of Metal Gear Solid (1998), the gameplay of Metal Gear Solid: The Twin Snakes was altered to resemble that of Metal Gear Solid 2: Sons of Liberty (2001). While all of the original areas and enemies were kept, new ways for the player to combat them were introduced, such as the ability to shoot from a first-person view. Enemy AI was improved, giving enemy soldiers the ability to communicate with each other and detect the player more intelligently with senses of sight and sound enhanced.

== Development ==
The Twin Snakes was first announced in 2003 by Nintendo of America, confirming that Silicon Knights would be developing under the guidance of Metal Gear creator Hideo Kojima and Nintendo's Shigeru Miyamoto. Kojima was busy working on Metal Gear Solid 3: Snake Eater (2004) at the time, and was unable to commit to the project full-time. He later suggested to both Miyamoto and Satoru Iwata to let Silicon Knights take the helm as he was a fan of their work. The company's CEO Denis Dyack, who had recently completed Eternal Darkness: Sanity's Requiem (2002), happened to be at the Nintendo cafeteria in Japan when he was approached by both Miyamoto and Iwata to work on The Twin Snakes, to which he agreed.

Although The Twin Snakes was largely developed at Silicon Knights, Ryuhei Kitamura directed many of the game's cinematics while Silicon Knights implemented them into the game to look identical to those in the original Metal Gear Solid, but upon inspection Hideo Kojima asked Kitamura to redo them in his well-known action style. The reworked cinematics did receive some criticism due to Kitamura's excessive use of the bullet time effect, which was largely inspired by the then popular hit movie The Matrix. The game's composition duties were split: some of the in-game music was handled by Steve Henifin and Silicon Knights' music staff, while the rest of the music (in-game, menus and cut scenes) was handled by Konami's music staff, including Metal Gear Solid 2 co-composer Norihiko Hibino.

The voice acting was re-recorded with the original cast from Metal Gear Solid, except for the role of the Cyborg Ninja. David Hayter, the English voice of Solid Snake, persuaded Konami to have the original voice cast reprise their roles. The main reason for the re-recording, according to an interview with Hayter, was because the increased audio quality allowed by the GameCube picked up outside noise from the original recordings that were inaudible in the PlayStation version. In the original game, Gray Fox and Donald Anderson were both voiced by Greg Eagles. However, in The Twin Snakes, Greg Eagles voices only Anderson, whereas the Ninja was voiced by Rob Paulsen. The revised voice acting is used in Metal Gear Solid 4: Guns of the Patriots (2008) during Snake's reminiscence as the English-language voice-recording used in the original game was not recorded in a sound-proof studio. Mei Ling, Nastasha Romanenko, and Naomi Hunter speak with North American accents in The Twin Snakes, whereas in the original Metal Gear Solid, they spoke with Chinese, Russian, and English accents, respectively. Unlike the original Metal Gear Solid, no Japanese voice acting were recorded for Twin Snakes - instead the Japanese version uses the English voice acting with subtitles.

== Release ==
The Twin Snakes was released on March 9, 2004, in North America. It was originally to be released in November 2003, but was pushed back, along with the other versions. The European date was pushed back several weeks.

In Japan The Twin Snakes was released on March 11 alongside an exclusive Premium Package. The box includes the game itself; a platinum-colored GameCube adorned with the FOXHOUND logo; a 44-page book titled Memorandum containing production notes, sketches and photos; and a GameCube disc called the "Special Disc" containing an emulated version of the Family Computer version of the original Metal Gear.

== Reception ==
Reception

Aggregate scores
Aggregator	Score
GameRankings	85.58%
Metacritic	85/100

Review scores
Publication	Score
Eurogamer	8/10
Game Informer	9.25/10
GameSpot	8.2/10
IGN	8.5/10

Much like the original Metal Gear Solid was met with positive reviews from critics, The Twin Snakes received an 85.58% and 85/100 from GameRankings and Metacritic, respectively. IGN gave The Twin Snakes 8.5 out of 10, praising its superior graphics and likening the presentation to epic movies. GameSpot gave it an 8.2 out of 10 or "Great" on their scale, Eurogamer rated The Twin Snakes as 8 out of 10 and Gaming Age gave it an "A−" rating. Game Informer gave The Twin Snakes a 9.25 out of 10, citing its improved gameplay and graphics, and also its faithful retelling of the original Metal Gear Solid story. The publication later placed The Twin Snakes at #11 on their list of "Top 25 GameCube Games" in 2009. Official Nintendo Magazine placed the game 80th on their list of the Top 100 Best Nintendo games.

Despite receiving generally favorable reviews, The Twin Snakes has also drawn criticism. According to GamePro, the game has a "flagging framerate and bouts of slowdown that occur when too much activity crowds the screen." The use of new gameplay elements from Sons of Liberty was seen as unnecessary, as GamePro thought that the level design was virtually unchanged from Metal Gear Solid, which "spoils the challenge... and completely ruins one boss battle (Revolver Ocelot)."
