= Silicon Knights =

Defunct Canadian video game developer

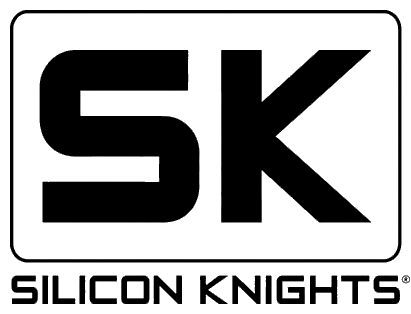
- Industry: Video games
- Founded: July 1992; 34 years ago
- Founders: Denis Dyack; Michael Mays
- Defunct: May 16, 2014; 12 years ago
- Fate: Bankruptcy
- Headquarters: St. Catharines, Ontario, Canada
- Key people: Denis Dyack; Michael Mays
- Number of employees: 97 (July 2011); 5 (October 2012)
- Website: siliconknights.com (archived)

Silicon Knights was a Canadian video game developer. Founded in 1992 by Denis Dyack and Michael Mays, the company was headquartered in St. Catharines, Ontario. They started developing for computers such as the Atari ST and IBM PC compatibles. After 1996, it moved to console titles.

In 2012, Dyack left Silicon Knights to form a new game studio, Precursor Games, after the loss of a court case against Epic Games over the game engine Unreal Engine 3. Epic Games won the case and a counter-suit for $4.45 million on grounds of copyright infringement, misappropriation of trade secrets, and breach of contract. Following the case, Silicon Knights filed for bankruptcy on May 16, 2014.

== Games ==
=== Released ===
Silicon Knights' first games were real-time strategy/action hybrids for computers. Silicon Knights' last personal computer game, Blood Omen: Legacy of Kain, was published in 1996, after which Silicon Knights moved to console games. In 2000, Silicon Knights was signed by Nintendo to create games exclusively for its consoles, during which time it produced Eternal Darkness: Sanity's Requiem. Together with Nintendo, Silicon Knights worked with Konami to create Metal Gear Solid: The Twin Snakes. In 2004, the company ended exclusivity with Nintendo. In 2005, it partnered with publisher Microsoft Game Studios for Too Human, though Nintendo still owned stock in the company. In 2008, the company released Too Human, which was published by Microsoft for the Xbox 360. The final game developed by the company, X-Men: Destiny, was released in September 2011 for multiple console platforms.

Year	Game	Platform(s)
1992	Cyber Empires	Amiga, Atari ST, MS-DOS
1993	Fantasy Empires	MS-DOS
1994	Dark Legions	MS-DOS
1996	The Horde	Saturn
1996	Blood Omen: Legacy of Kain	Windows, PlayStation
2002	Eternal Darkness: Sanity's Requiem	GameCube
2004	Metal Gear Solid: The Twin Snakes	GameCube
2008	Too Human	Xbox 360
2011	X-Men: Destiny	PlayStation 3, Xbox 360, Wii

=== Canceled ===
Canceled games included Silent Hill: The Box (later known as just The Box and The Ritualyst), Too Human 2 (Too Human: Rise of the Giants), Too Human 3, Eternal Darkness 2, and the little-known projects Siren in the Maelstrom, The Sandman and King's Quest.

== Founding of Eight ==
Silicon Knights collaborated with academic institutions and participated in the formation of Eight. Eight: The Hamilton Institute for Interactive Digital Media was a partnership between Silicon Knights, McMaster University, the Art Gallery of Hamilton (AGH) and Mohawk College, focused on developing create an academic and research model around interactive digital media and supporting research in the field of interactive entertainment.

== Lawsuit with Epic Games ==
On July 19, 2007, Silicon Knights sued Epic Games for failure to "provide a working game engine", causing the Ontario-based game developer to "experience considerable losses." The suit alleged that Epic Games was "sabotaging" Unreal Engine 3 licensees. Epic's licensing document stated that a working version of the engine would be available within six months of the Xbox 360 developer kits being released. Silicon Knights claimed that Epic not only missed this deadline, but that when a working version of the engine was eventually released, the documentation was insufficient. The game studio also claimed Epic had withheld vital improvements to the game engine, claiming they were "game specific", while also using licensing fees to fund development of its own titles rather than the engine itself.

In August 2007, Epic Games counter-sued Silicon Knights, alleging the studio was aware when it signed on that certain features of Unreal Engine 3 were still in development and that components would continue to be developed and added as Epic completed work on Gears of War. Therefore, in a statement, Epic said that "SK knew when it committed to the licensing agreement that Unreal Engine 3 may not meet its requirements and may not be modified to meet them." Additionally, the counter-suit claimed that Silicon Knights had "made unauthorized use of Epic's Licensed Technology" and had "infringed and otherwise violated Epic's intellectual property rights, including Epic's copyrighted works, trade secrets, know how and confidential information" by incorporating Unreal Engine 3 code into its own engine. Furthermore, Epic claimed the Canadian developer broke the contract by employing this derivative work in an internal title and a second game with Sega, a partnership for which it never received a license fee.

On May 30, 2012, Epic Games prevailed against Silicon Knights' lawsuit, and won its counter-suit for $4.45 million on grounds of copyright infringement, misappropriation of trade secrets, and breach of contract, an injury award that was later doubled due to prejudgment interest, attorneys' fees and costs. Consistent with Epic's counterclaims, the presiding judge, James C. Dever III, stated that Silicon Knights had "deliberately and repeatedly copied thousands of lines of Epic Games' copyrighted code, and then attempted to conceal its wrongdoing by removing Epic Games' copyright notices and by disguising Epic Games' copyrighted code as Silicon Knights' own." Evidence against Silicon Knights was "overwhelming", said Dever, as it not only copied functional code but also "non-functional, internal comments Epic Games' programmers had left for themselves."

As a result, on November 7, 2012, Silicon Knights was directed by the court to destroy all game code derived from Unreal Engine 3 and all information from licensee-restricted areas of Epic's Unreal Engine documentation website, and to permit Epic Games access to the company's servers and other devices to ensure these items had been removed. In addition, the studio was instructed to recall and destroy all unsold retail copies of games built with Unreal Engine 3 code, including Too Human, X-Men Destiny, The Sandman, The Box/Ritualyst, and Siren in the Maelstrom (the latter three titles were projects never released, or even officially announced).

Talking to IGN in 2019, Dyack expressed regrets over the lawsuit not just because of the loss but also the fact he underestimated the amount of time it took to settle the litigation. Had he known then, Dyack said he would have reconsidered pursuing the lawsuit.

== Government funding ==
=== Provincial ===
In February 2008, Silicon Knights was granted $500 thousand by the Ontario Media Development Corporation (OMDC) through its Video Game Prototype Initiative. Using this funding, it was to create a prototype for a "third-person action/psychological thriller".

In July 2011, Silicon Knights was awarded $2.5 million to be distributed over five years in provincial funding to improve its technology, create new products and become a self-publishing company. The investment would supposedly have allowed the company to improve its technology, hire 80 new people while keeping 97 current jobs and allow the company to become "self-sustaining." As of November 2011, Silicon Knights had not received any of this funding.

=== Federal ===
In April 2010, it was announced that the company would receive nearly $4 million through the Canadian government's Community Adjustment Fund. The purpose of the loan was to allow the hiring of 65 new staff members, who would be working on a new game targeting multiple platforms. The game was estimated to take two to five years to complete.

== Filing for bankruptcy ==
On May 16, 2014, following the loss of the court case, Silicon Knights filed for bankruptcy and a Certificate of Appointment was issued by the Office of the Superintendent of Bankruptcy, with Collins Barrow Toronto Limited being appointed as Trustee in Bankruptcy.
