= Chasing the Green =

Big Shots (Chasing the Green)
- Directed by: Russ Emanuel
- Written by: Craig Frankel; Emilio Iasiello
- Story by: Craig Frankel
- Produced by: Howard Nash
- Starring: Jeremy London; Ryan Hurst; Heather McComb; Dan Grimaldi; Robert Picardo; William Devane
- Cinematography: Seth Melnick
- Edited by: Emile Harris; Josh Summers; Thomas J. Wentworth
- Music by: Neil Argo; Jason Livesay
- Production company: Igolf Prods.
- Distributed by: Cinema Epoch
- Release date: April 17, 2009 (Los Angeles)
- Running time: 102 minutes
- Country: United States
- Language: English

Chasing the Green is a 2009 American drama film directed by Russ Emanuel and starring Jeremy London, Ryan Hurst, Heather McComb, Dan Grimaldi, Robert Picardo and William Devane.

== Cast ==
- Jeremy London as Adam Franklin
- Ryan Hurst as Ross Franklin
- Heather McComb as Lynn
- William Devane as Victor Gatling
- Robert Picardo as Dave Foxx
- Patricia Rae as Mona Beads
- Dan Grimaldi as Peter Allen
- Larry Pine as Frank Daniels
- Vinny Vella as Vincent
- Michael Masini as Stanley
- Howard Nash as Bob Printus
- Chris Gunn as Bert Tyler
