= Russ Emanuel =

American filmmaker

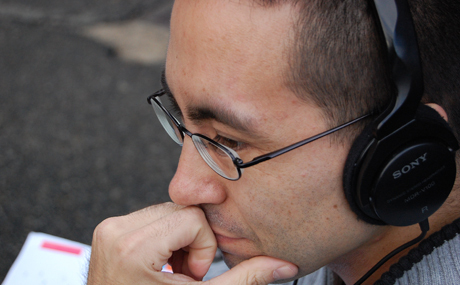
- Born: California, US
- Occupation: Independent filmmaker and director
- Education: University of Southern California

Website
- russem.com

Russell "Russ" Emanuel is an American director, producer, and independent filmmaker.

Emanuel founded Russem Productions, a Los Angeles based production company in 2002, through which he has produced and directed short and feature-length films.

== Early life ==
Emanuel was born in San Francisco, California and grew up in both Japan and the United States.

Emanuel attended the University of Southern California in Los Angeles with an emphasis in film studies, international relations, and Japanese.

== Films ==
Emanuel's first films were shorts, including Her Knight (2003) and Girl with Gun (2006). In 2007, Emanuel produced his first feature film, P.J.. Emanuel subsequently directed the feature film Chasing the Green (2009), starring William Devane, and The Legends of Nethiah (2012) starring John Heard and Robert Picardo. His 2015 horror feature film Occupants, also starring Picardo and Briana White, screened at film festivals including Shriekfest 2016. He was recently inducted into the International Indie Filmmakers Hall of Fame for the year 2025. The International Indie Filmmakers Hall of Fame recognizes and honors individuals who have shown significant contributions and achievements in their field, and an outstanding dedication to the independent filmmaking community as a whole.

== Documentaries ==
Emanuel directed and produced the documentary film Restoration of Paradise (2014), about the history of the Bolsa Chica wetlands, which has at different times been a Native American settlement, President Teddy Roosevelt's Gun Club, and a World War II home for artillery batteries. The documentary was narrated by Robert Picardo.

== Filmography ==
Year	Title	Role	Note
2003	The Failures	Assistant to Producer (feature film)	
2003	Her Knight	Producer, Director, Writer (short film)	
2004	The Diary	Producer (short film)	
2005	Mavet	Producer (short film)	
2006	Girl with Gun	Producer, Director (short film)	
2007	The Rapture	Associate Producer (feature film)	
2007	Perfect Red	Producer (short film)	
2008	Heaven's Messenger (original title P.J.)	Producer, Director (feature film)	
2009	Chasing the Green (new title Big Shots)	Director (feature film)	
2010	Cult 11	Producer - 4 episodes, Director - 2 episodes: "Nurse Janet's Happy Place", "Make-Up Time, Mr. President" (web series)	
2012	The Legends of Nethiah	Director (feature film)	
2013	The Meeting	Director, Editor - 2 episodes: "Tales from the Curbside: A Prairie Homeless Companion", "A Savage Meeting" (web series)	
2014	Restoration of Paradise	Producer, Director, Writer, Cinematographer, Editor (documentary)	
2015	Alterverse (original title Occupants)	Director (feature film)	
2017	Collar	Producer, Director (short film)	
2018	The Assassin's Apprentice	Director (short film)	
2018	Allegedly	Producer (short film)	
2018	The Meeting	Director, Editor - 2 episodes: "A Not So Funny Meeting", "Meeting Clapit" (web series)	
2019	American Wisper (original title Wisper)	Director (feature film)	
2020	Lighter Than Air	Producer (short film)	
2020	Routine	Director (short film)	
2022	The Assassin's Apprentice 2: Silbadores of the Canary Islands	Director (short film)	
2024	Apocalypse Death Party (original title Staycation)	Producer, Director (feature film)	
2025	Quarantine	Producer, Director (short film)	
2026	Round the Corner	Producer, Director (short film)	
2027	All For Tomorrow	Producer, Director (feature film)	
