= Denis Dyack =

Canadian video game developer

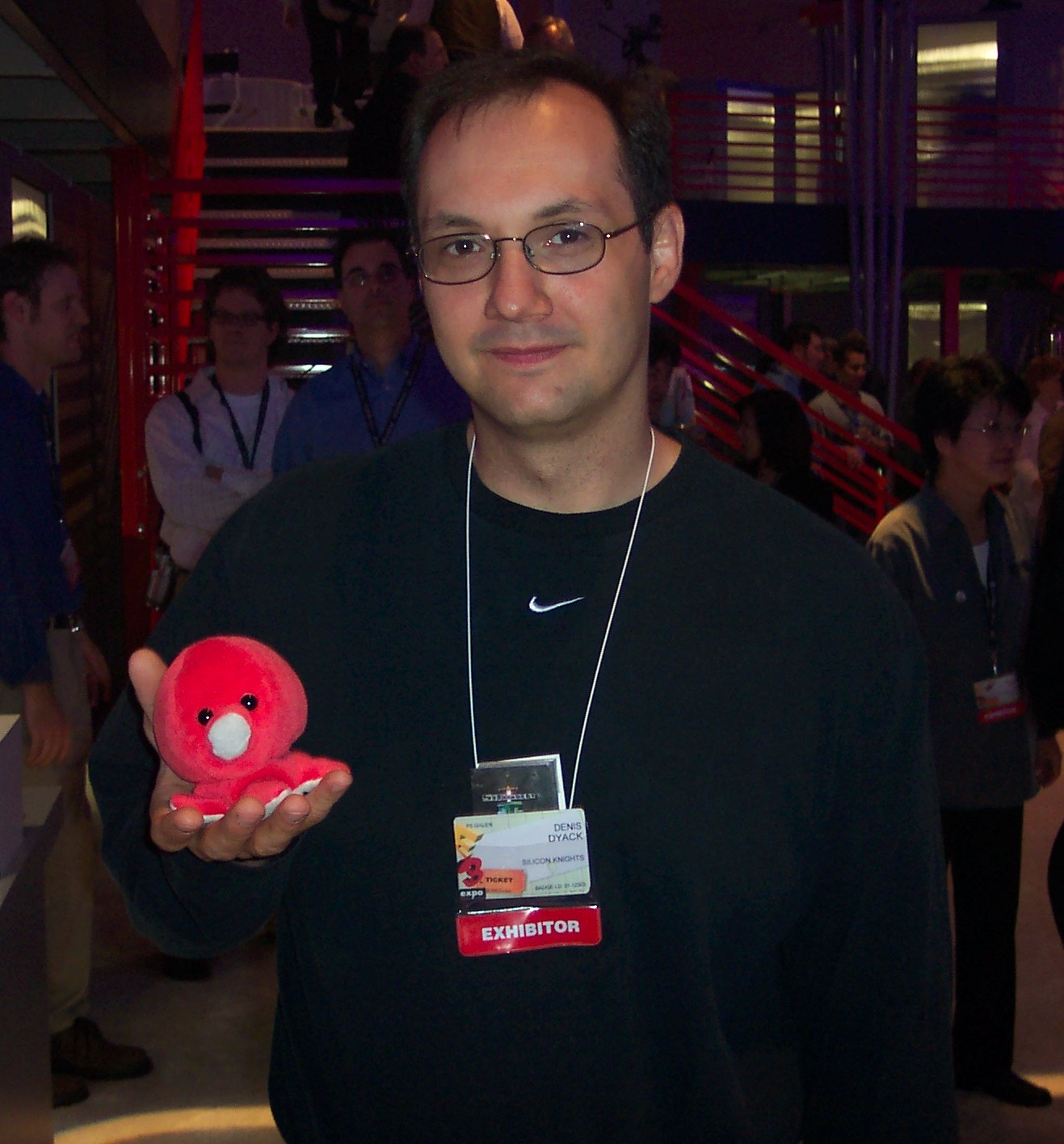
- Dyack at E3 2003
- Born: July 24, 1966 (age 60)
- Occupation: Video game designer

Denis Dyack (born July 24, 1966) is a Canadian video game developer and the CEO of Apocalypse Studios. He is also the former president of Silicon Knights, and is a video game designer, writer, director and producer. Dyack directed Blood Omen: Legacy of Kain and Eternal Darkness: Sanity's Requiem, and is directing Deadhaus Sonata. Dyack was inducted into the Canadian Gaming Hall of Fame by the Canadian Game Development Talent Awards in November 2011.

== Biography ==
=== Silicon Knights ===
Denis Dyack graduated with a Bachelor of Physical Education Degree from Brock University, a H.BSc in Computer Science from Brock University and a Master of Science (Computer Science) from the University of Guelph. Dyack cofounded Silicon Knights in 1992 and the company's early games were developed for MS-DOS, Atari ST, and Amiga computers, transitioning to console development in 1996 with Blood Omen: Legacy of Kain for the PlayStation.

In 1998, Silicon Knights partnered as a second party with Nintendo to develop Eternal Darkness: Sanity's Requiem. The game was upgraded to become one of the earlier titles to release on the GameCube. A subsequent partnership between Nintendo, Konami, and Silicon Knights led to the release of Metal Gear Solid: The Twin Snakes.

The Nintendo partnership was dissolved in April 2004 and new collaborations with Sega and Microsoft were announced in 2005. Following the announcement, Dyack explained:

I think gamers can expect what they normally expect from us, even a bit more. The relationship with Microsoft is going to create something very unique ... People will notice that we're consistent with our games, but will also be very excited with where we're taking it. With some of the directions that our very radical and very exciting. We can't wait to talk about it, it's just not the time yet ... They [Sega] understand that we want to do bigger and better games with higher production values. Sega seems to really get it.

In 2019, Dyack explained that the dissolution from Nintendo occurred because at the time, the company wanted to focus on party games with their upcoming console the Wii and he felt it did not fit Silicon Knight's portfolio. However, when Nintendo resumed making story-driven games again with the Nintendo Switch a decade later, he expressed some regret over that decision.

=== Too Human and disputes with Epic Games ===
Shortly after the partnership with Microsoft, Silicon Knights announced that Too Human, a game originally conceived for the PlayStation, would be coming to Microsoft's Xbox 360 console as a planned trilogy. The game, dramatically reworked from the original concept, married the ideas of Norse mythology with high technology. The company was subject to a successful countersuit from Epic Games in May 2012 over the development of games using Epic's Unreal Engine 3, and the latter was awarded US$4.45 million in damages. Silicon Knights was ordered to destroy all copies of existing titles using the engine, as well as in-development games The Sandman, Siren in the Maelstrom and The Box/Rytualist.

Following Too Human, Silicon Knights developed X-Men Destiny, a partnership between Silicon Knights, Activision and Marvel for the Xbox 360 and PlayStation 3 consoles.

In 2013, Silicon Knights was involved in a dispute with Ontario's Federal Economic Development Agency, after it received a 2010 loan of around US$4 million for the development of a new mainstream video game that would create more than 65 jobs. Repayment was scheduled for 2013, but Ontario government officials refused to disclose any information to the media.

Talking to IGN in 2019, Dyack expressed regrets over the lawsuit not just because of the loss but also the fact he underestimated the amount of time it took to settle the litigation. Had he known then, Dyack said he would have reconsidered pursuing the lawsuit.

=== Precursor Games and Shadow of the Eternals ===
Shortly after Silicon Knights filed a new appeal in the Epic Games case, the closure of the company was announced in the media in May 2013. An unnamed source told Polygon that most of the company's employees were laid off in mid-2012 and Dyack formed a new company, Precursor Games, with a core group of ex-Silicon Knights employees at around the same time. At the time of the announcement, Silicon Knights had not filed for bankruptcy and the studio's chief financial officer, Mike Mays, insisted that the studio was "definitely alive."

Following the closure of Silicon Knights, Dyack became the chief creative officer at Precursor Games. Dyack announced the change on Silicon Knights' forums:

It has been a very long time ... I am sorry I was away so long, it was not intended and I truly regret that I could not interact more with you all. I wanted to do so but it simply was not an option for me at the time. I really hope you can understand. As most of you already probably have seen, I am no longer at Silicon Knights and I joined Precursor Games some time ago ... I look forward to seeing what we can accomplish with the community and our crowd sourcing campaigns. I do see that some people are disappointed at the way things turned out, so was I and many others, believe me.

Due to ongoing litigation between Silicon Knights and Epic Games, the move to Precursor was under scrutiny.

In October 2012, Kotaku published an article by Andrew McMillen, entitled "What Went Wrong With Silicon Knights' X-Men: Destiny?". McMillen's story covered allegations from eight anonymous sources that Dyack mistreated employees. McMillen sought out responses from Dyack but none of the members of Silicon Knights' management team responded to his request for comment at the time. During the Kickstarter campaign for Shadow of the Eternals in May 2013, Dyack was asked to respond to the article by Precursor CEO Paul Caporicci. A video was created directly addressing the allegations published by Kotaku as well as additional allegations expressed across the internet that were unrelated to the piece itself. He would also claim that Kotaku had accused him of embezzling funds. Kotaku noted in their own official response to the video that no such claims were made in the original piece but several of their original sources had made those allegations during the production of the article.

Shadow of the Eternals was launched on Kickstarter twice; the first was in June 2013 with the goal of $1,350,000. It was cancelled when the controversy started pouring in, although Precursor chief operating officer Shawn Jackson assured it was due to the studio wanting to scale down the project. Around the same time, former Silicon Knights staff and Precursor founder Kenneth McCulloch was arrested on child pornography charges, upon which the company immediately severed ties. The second Kickstarter was launched in August 2013 for $750,000.

=== Quantum Entanglement Entertainment ===
Shadow of the Eternals failed both of its Kickstarter campaigns, leading to the project being placed on indefinite hold and the demise of Precursor Games. Both Jackson and Precursor CEO Paul Caporicci formed Creative Bytes Studios in 2013. In late 2014, Dyack announced the formation of Quantum Entanglement Entertainment, Inc., with the aim of restarting production on Shadow of the Eternals as well as potentially expanding the IP into movies and television.

=== Apocalypse Studios ===
In January 2018, QEE was quietly shut down and the production of Shadow of the Eternals was put on hold. Dyack announced his new company Apocalypse Studios and with it a new free-to-play role-playing game for the PC titled Deadhaus Sonata.

== Personal views ==
In a July 2005 interview, Dyack revealed his perspective on the future of large-scale multiplayer online games:

I really want a story, really want to find out what's happening, have an experience. Rather than just trying to get to the next level. I think in the future, when bandwidth becomes less of an issue, multi-player games and single-player games will start to merge. Whether it's cooperative or competitive, there will be an online component to most everything. The future of hardware is no hardware.

Dyack gained some notoriety after he expressed controversial opinions about the role of the gaming press and about the effects of forum culture on the video game industry.

== Works ==
Year	Title	Role(s)
1992	Cyber Empires	Game design
1993	Fantasy Empires	Original concept, Music, Programming
1994	Dark Legions	Design, Sound Effects, Programming
1996	Blood Omen: Legacy of Kain	Concept, Production lead, Lead programmer
2002	Eternal Darkness: Sanity's Requiem	Director, Producer
2004	Metal Gear Solid: The Twin Snakes	Co-Producer
2008	Too Human	Director
2011	X-Men: Destiny	Chief Creative Officer
TBA	Deadhaus Sonata	Director, Chief Creative Officer

== Accolades and awards ==
Dyack is a member of the Peter Drucker Society and the board of the Entertainment Software Association of Canada. In 2011, he was inducted into the Canadian Game Developers Hall of Fame. Dyack was awarded Outstanding Achievement in Character or Story Development by the Academy of Interactive Arts & Sciences for his work on Eternal Darkness.
