= Cyber Empires =

1992 video game

- North American cover art
- Developer(s): Silicon Knights
- Publisher(s): Strategic Simulations
- Producer(s): George MacDonald
- Designer(s): Denis Dyack; Rick Goertz
- Composer(s): Richard Joseph
- Platform(s): Amiga, Atari ST, MS-DOS
- Release: March 1992
- Genre(s): Action, strategy

Cyber Empires (known as Steel Empire in Europe) is a strategy/top-view fighting game produced by Silicon Knights. The game was produced in MS-DOS, Atari ST and Amiga versions, and was originally released in March 1992. The current copyright holder was Strategic Simulations, Inc., which later became part of Ubisoft.

== Gameplay ==
The game has two basic components. The first requires the player to engage in Risk-like strategic decision-making with the goal of conquering the given land mass. The player raises cyborg armies to accomplish this goal. During the second basic component of the game, the top-down battle mode, players can choose to assume manual control of one cyborg in their army during offensive or defensive battle sessions, or let the computer simulate the battle behind the scenes to much more predictable outcomes. This allows players to play only the Risk-style board game component of the game. The opposite, battles only, is also possible. Cyber Empires innovated by mixing strategy with arcade action on a global scale.

The game offers a total of nine different cyborgs from which the user can create an army of up to 10 units, that is no more than 10 units may occupy one country. The units range from the small and fast Mercury capable of little damage but a high speed, to the Titan which is the ultimate cyborg capable of long-range missile attacks and short-range auto-cannon attacks.

The strategy part of the game allows the user to place capitols in any countries occupied by their troops. Countries with capitols in them create extra revenue every turn and can be built upon. The buildings includes fortifications, factories and factory upgrades. Fortifications comes in 3 varieties: light, medium and heavy, but can only protect a country if at least one cyborg is present. Factories come in 3 varieties also, they can have 1, 2 or 4 bays. The number of bays a factory has determined the number of cyborgs it can build at once. The upgrade level of a factory, on the other hand, determines how fast an individual cyborg can be built.

== Reception ==
Computer Gaming World warned that Cyber Empires was an action game with strategic elements and that it was not well suited for strategy-only players. The magazine called it "a solid game. It has nothing to rave about and nothing that hobbles it", with "adequate" graphics and sound, and recommended the game to action gamers who were "fans of BattleTech, Robotech and Giant Robot universes". A 1994 survey of strategic space games set in the year 2000 and later gave the game two-plus stars out of five.
