= Heather McComb =

American actress (born 1977)

- Born: March 2, 1977 (age 49); Barnegat, New Jersey, U.S.
- Occupation: Actress
- Years active: 1989–present
- Spouse(s): James Van Der Beek (m. 2003; div. 2010) Scott Michael Campbell (m. 2026)

Heather McComb (born March 2, 1977) is an American actress. She is best known for her roles as Maggie on Party of Five (1998–1999) and Frances Malone in Profiler (1997–1998).

== Career ==
Born in Barnegat, New Jersey, on March 2, 1977, McComb started acting at age two in a commercial for Publisher's Clearing House. In 1989, she played the title character in Francis Ford Coppola's segment, "Life Without Zoë", of the anthology film New York Stories. She played the part of Scout on the 1990 television program The Outsiders. The show only lasted one season. When she appeared in the television film Generation X in 1996, she became the first actress to portray the X-Men character Jubilee on screen. In 1997, McComb starred in the television series Profiler as Frances Malone. The next year, she joined the cast of Party of Five in the part of Maggie.

== Personal life ==
On July 5, 2003, McComb married actor James Van Der Beek. They separated in April 2009, and on November 20, Van Der Beek filed for divorce. The divorce was finalized on March 31, 2010.

McComb married actor Scott Michael Campbell on May 30, 2026.

== Filmography ==
=== Film ===
Year	Title	Role	Notes
1989	New York Stories	Zoe Montez	
1991	Kickboxer 2: The Road Back	Jo	
1992	Stay Tuned	Diane Knable	
1993	Beethoven's 2nd	Michelle	
1996	God's Lonely Man	Christine Birch	
1998	Wild Horses	Autumn	
1998	Apt Pupil	Becky Trask	
1999	Freak Talks About Sex	Nichole	
1999	The Joyriders	Crystal	
1999	2 Little, 2 Late	Holly Shannon	
1999	Anywhere but Here	Janice Pearlman	
2001	Don's Plum	Constance	
2001	Nice Guys Finish Last	Suzie	
2002	Devious Beings	Jodie	
2002	Artie	Emily Miller	
2003	All the Real Girls	Mary-Margaret	
2006	Steel City	Lucy James	
2008	Ocean of Pearls	Susan Clark	
2008	Chasing the Green	Lynn	
2008	Shark Swarm	Amy Zuckerman	
2009	2012: Supernova	Laura	
2011	Cornered	Jannete	
2012	Pretty Bad Actress	Gloria	
2012	Paranormal Abduction	Rebekah	
2015	Battle Scars	Michelle	Also producer
2016	Silver Skies	Francine	
2019	Manipulated	Sara	
2020	Forgotten Abduction	Lena	
2020	Shooting Star	Mary	
2020	Heirlooms	Laura Russell	
^{2023}	Incarcerated	Maeve Branning	

=== Television ===
Year	Title	Role	Notes
1990	Alien Nation	Cindy	Episode: "Crossing the Line"
1990	The Outsiders	Belinda "Scout" Jenkins	8 episodes
1990	Thirtysomething	Melodie Kline	Episode: "Happy New Year"
1991	Midnight Caller	Katherine Marino	Episode: "That's Amoré"
1991	Who's the Boss?	Patricia	Episode: "Days of Blunder"
1991	The Wonder Years	Cindy	Episode: "Full Moon Rising"
1994	Grace Under Fire	Julia Shirley	Episode: "Dear Grace"
1994	Sirens	Laura Downey	Episode: "Guns, Bombs and Fantasies"
1995	Chicago Hope	Mellisa Connell	Episode: "Great White Hope"
1995	The X Files	Shannon Asbury	Episode: "Die Hand Die Verletzt"
1995	Weird Science	Tori	Episode: "Quantum Wyatt"
1996	Due South	Celine	Episode: "Some Like It Red"
1996	Boston Common	Meredith	Episode: "Conspiracy of Dunces"
1996	Townies	Stacy	Episode: "It's Go Time"
1996	No One Would Tell	Nicki	TV film
1996	Generation X	Jubilation Lee/Jubilee	TV film
1997	Millennium	Maddie Haskell	Episode: "The Wild and the Innocent"
1997	Cracker	Dee Dee Wilder	Episode: "An American Dream"
1997–1998	Profiler	Frances Malone	17 episodes
1999	The Practice	Lynette Hayes	Episode: "Crossfire"
1998–1999	Party of Five	Maggie	11 episodes
2000	If These Walls Could Talk 2	Diane	TV film
2001	NYPD Blue	Molly	Episode: "Dying to Testify"
2001	The Guardian	Dina Jameson	Episode: "Indian Summer"
2002	Strong Medicine	Cecilia "Cissy"	Episode: "Flesh and Blood"
2002	CSI: Miami	Ginny Taylor	Episode: "A Horrible Mind"
2003	The Handler	Jackie	Episode: "Body of Evidence"
2005	Crossing Jordan	Kate	Episode: "Gray Murders"
2005	CSI: Crime Scene Investigation	Annabelle Frost	Episode: "Spark of Life"
2005	The Inside	Holly Lynn Krandall	Episode: "Declawed"
2005	Killer Instinct	Sarah Miller	Episode: "Five Easy Pieces"
2005	CSI: NY	Heather Davison	Episode: "Bad Beat"
2006	Without a Trace	Meghan Sullivan	Episode: "Expectations"
2007	Shark	Janet Butler	Episode: "Wayne's World"
2008	Prison Break	Rita Morgan	4 episodes
2010	Drop Dead Diva	Caitlin Tanner	Episode: "The Long Road to Napa"
2010	The Event	FBI Agent Angela Collier	7 episodes
2011	The Mentalist	Peregrine Hartley	Episode: "The Red Mile"
2011	Memphis Beat	Lisa	Episode: "Lost"
2011	House M.D.	Theresa	Episode: "Transplant"
2013	Body of Proof	Mandy Wells	Episode: "Dark City"
2013	Rizzoli & Isles	Leslie Cabot	Episode: "Partners in Crime"
2014	Bones	Erika Stamp	Episode: "The Ghost in the Killer"
2014	Shameless	Wendy	Episode: "Emily"
2014	Ray Donovan	Patty	4 episodes
2015	Castle	Nicole Morris	Episode: "Castle, P.I."
2015	CSI: Cyber	Elaine	Episode: "The Evil Twin"
2016	Day of Reckoning	Laura	TV film
2017	Girl Followed	Abby	TV film
2017	Sweet Home Carolina	Diane	TV film
2018	A Stolen Life (Deadly Lessons)	Beth	TV film
2019	Seduced by a Killer	Nancy	TV film
2019	Most Likely to Murder	Laura	TV film
2019	The Rookie	Marilyn	Episode: "Caught Stealing"
2020	Station 19	Rachel Burke	Episode: "Into the Woods"
2020	Grey's Anatomy	Rachel Burke	Episode: "A Diagnosis"
