= Dark Legions =

1994 video game

- Developer(s): Silicon Knights
- Publisher(s): Strategic Simulations
- Designer(s): Denis Dyack; Rick Goertz; Andrew Summerfield
- Platform(s): MS-DOS
- Release: April 1994
- Genre(s): Action, strategy
- Mode(s): Single-player, multiplayer

Dark Legions is a 1994 action strategy game for MS-DOS. It was developed by Silicon Knights and published by Strategic Simulations (SSI).

== Key features ==
Some key features of this game include:

- Multi-player head to head
- 16 unit types with unique characteristics and abilities
- A combination of strategic movement with real-time combat
- Purchasing of units at game start allows each player to customize their forces
- Multiple game maps

Many reviewers and players note it as an updated version of the 1983 computer game Archon: The Light and the Dark, calling it "Archon with an attitude."

== Description ==
Dark Legions is an action based strategy game. The player may play against the computer or another human on a strategic game board. In the beginning of the game, the player buys their forces with a predefined number of credits, and may purchase any of the 16 characters along with various kinds of traps and even rings of power to upgrade their creatures. One is chosen to be the "Orb Keeper". The Orb Keeper is like the King in chess: the game is over if he dies. Then players set up on a chosen map and start to move turn wise. When one player moves a piece into the same square as an opponent, the action is instantly transferred to another board map that represents the terrain upon which the two pieces occupy. Each player starts with their single piece on this "melee map" and must fight using their figures. The fight is simultaneously controlled in real time.

== Reception ==
James V. Trunzo reviewed Dark Legions in White Wolf Inphobia #50 (Dec., 1994), rating it a 5 out of 5 and stated that "Dark Legions is outstanding. I've always been a big fan of Archon, and unlike others I liked Archon Ultra! However, the two products don't compare. Dark Legions is like chess, Stratego and Archon rolled into one. If you enjoy strategy and tactics with a fantasy flair, you'll really love this game."
