= Danny Buday =

American filmmaker

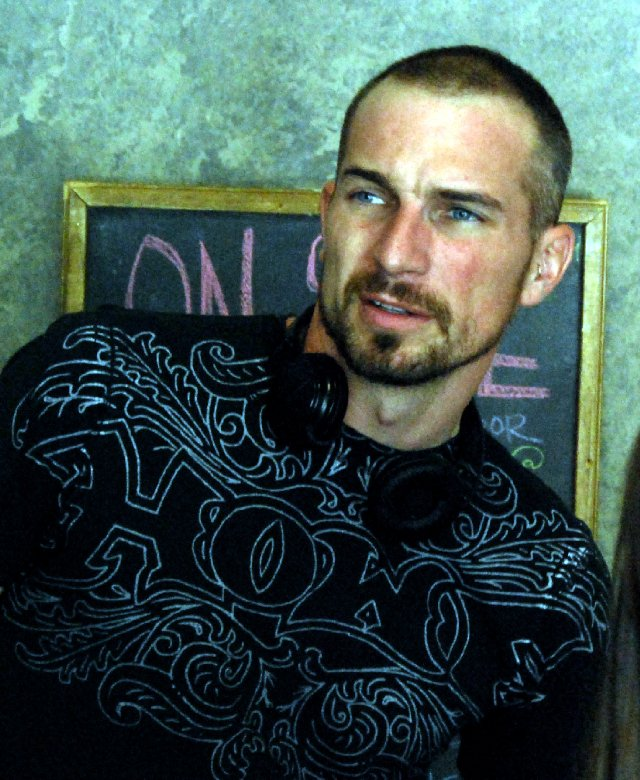
Danny Buday

Danny Buday (born February 8, 1977) is filmmaker who wrote, directed, and produced the feature film Five Star Day, starring Cam Gigandet and Jena Malone. Five Star Day won the Jury Award for 'Best Feature' at the 2010 Stony Brook Film Festival and was honored as the Opening Night Gala Film at the 2010 Newport Beach Film Festival.

== Career ==
As an alumnus of the American Film Institute (AFI) masters directing program, Danny Buday wrote, directed, and composed the score for the AFI award-winning thesis film Dependency, which was recognized as an official selection of the Los Angeles International Short Film Festival, the Plus Camerimage International Film Festival, an official nominee of the A.S.C. Heritage Cinematography Award, and voted 'Best Student Film' of the Dallas Deep Ellum Film Festival. Danny also directed a second thesis film for AFI, a 1940s musical entitled The Name of the Game.

After graduating from AFI, Danny was hired to write the teen action/thriller Kennedy High for Barry Josephson’s company Josephson Entertainment (Enchanted, Bones) and wrote an early draft of the highly acclaimed adaptation ‘Veronika Decides To Die’ for author Paulo Coelho (The Alchemist) and producer Sriram Das. Danny was subsequently hired to write for producer Michael O’Hoven (Capote). Buday has an MFA in directing from the American Film Institute (AFI) and a bachelor's degree in Business Marketing from California State University at Long Beach.

== Filmography ==
- Kennedy High - Feature Film - Action/Thriller - Virtu* Entertainment - 2010/2011 [Also "Bad Cop" released 2010 -info unavailable]
- Five Star Day - Feature Film - Drama - Inferno Distribution - 2009/2010
- The Name of the Game - AFI Thesis Film - 2006
- Dependency - AFI Thesis Film - 2005

=== Television ===
- A&E Biography - Segment Producer - A&E Network - 6 episodes - Sean Penn, Mötley Crüe, New Kids on the Block, Sean Cassidy, Amy Hecklering, James Foley (2005–2008)
- The Making of...'The Beginning' - Segment Producer/Camera - Fuel TV/Birdhouse Skateboards - Sean White/Tony Hawk skateboard video (2007)

== Awards ==
- Jury Award 'Best Feature' - Five Star Day - 2010 Stony Brook Film Festival
- Best Student Film' - Dependency - 2005 Dallas Deep Ellum Film Festival
