= Too Human =

2008 video game developed by Silicon Knights

- PAL region box art
- Developer: Silicon Knights
- Publisher: Microsoft Game Studios
- Designer: Denis Dyack
- Composer: Steve Henifin
- Engine: Unreal Engine 3
- Platform: Xbox 360
- Release: NA: August 19, 2008; JP: August 28, 2008; AU: August 28, 2008; EU: August 29, 2008
- Genre: Action role-playing
- Modes: Single-player, multiplayer

Too Human is an action role-playing game developed by Silicon Knights and published by Microsoft Studios. It was released in August 2008 for the Xbox 360. The game's story is a science-fictional futuristic retelling of Norse mythology that portrays the Æsir, the Norse gods, as cybernetically enhanced humans, tasked with protecting mankind from the onslaught of Loki's army of machines. The player takes the role of the Norse god Baldur, who is less cybernetic than the other gods thus being "too human".

The game is notable for having remained in development hell for almost ten years. It was originally announced in 1999 for release on the PlayStation, but this was abandoned and development switched to the GameCube in 2000 after Silicon Knights and Nintendo announced an exclusivity partnership. Development restarted again in 2005 when Microsoft bought the rights to the game and announced that it would be an Xbox 360 game. It was planned to be the first in a trilogy of games all developed by Silicon Knights.

Upon release, Too Human received mixed reviews from game critics; while the game's story and class system were generally praised, many were critical of the control scheme, graphics, level design, long respawn times, and cliffhanger ending. The game was involved in a lawsuit from 2007 to 2012 between developer Silicon Knights and Unreal Engine creators Epic Games regarding the Unreal Engine 3 engine used in the game. This resulted in Epic Games being awarded $4.45 million and Silicon Knights being forced to destroy all of its products that used Unreal Engine 3, including Too Human. Plans for an eventual trilogy were canceled because of the damage inflicted by the lawsuit, along with Silicon Knights filing for bankruptcy in May 2014.

== Gameplay ==
Baldur "juggling" a foe in the air with a laser cannon

Too Human is an action role-playing game from a third-person perspective. The player takes control of the lead character Baldur in a third-person perspective with the camera distance being adjustable, even controllable during some in-game cinematics to involve the player in the story further. Camera control is limited to the player, with the choice to re-adjust the camera back to its default third-person view being the primary feature following the player and swinging when the player does the same, similar to an auto targeting system. This is because the right analog stick is used for melee combat, instead of camera control, with certain attacks and combos being executed by pushing the stick in the direction of the target with follow-up stick movements applying further attacks with projectile attacks only using an auto lock-on system. Attacks can be combined to execute attacks such as performing combos on enemies in mid-air, attack slides, and juggling foes in the air with projectile weapon attacks. Another aspect of combat are "Ruiner" attacks, powerful abilities that can indirectly affect surrounding enemies and can be mixed with other attacks to perform finishing strikes.

The role-playing elements of the game come in the form of advanced character customization. At the beginning of the game, the player is given the choice between five different classes; berserker, champion, defender, commando, and bio engineer, with each having an advantage over another. The berserker is focused on melee combat while the commando is oriented on ranged combat. The bio engineer has advanced healing abilities and the defender has a strong armor defense. Finally, the champion is a balanced all rounder with multiple air strike attacks. During the game, players can collect various items that they can equip and use. There are fifteen variations of weapon classes such as pistols, heavy lasers, dual and two-handed combat weapons, armor for different body parts, and "charms" that allow players to use powerful Ruiner abilities. Many items can also be bought and customized by color and effectiveness—using collectable runes—in-between levels back at the Æsir's base of Asgard.

As players progress through the game, they can level up by slaying foes (Goblins, Trolls, Dark Elves, and Undead) and achieving high combos, allowing access to more efficient items and skills; these items and skills can be used in the game's skill tree mechanic, where points earned with every level up are applied to improve stats and unlock new abilities unique to each different character class. In the early stages of the game, the player can choose between two alignments; Cybernetic and Human. The Cybernetic alignment allows use of certain weapons like heavy lasers and further cybernetic upgrades, while the Human alignment emphasizes quick movement and improved combos.

=== Online and multiplayer ===
Along with the single player campaign, Too Human features a cooperative multiplayer component that can be played over Xbox Live. Hosts can support only a second player with a "drop-in, drop out" system. This allows players to join games hosted in levels they have yet to complete, as long as the host has, allowing high and low-level players to join games suited for either. Players can use characters from their single- player games and earn experience, levels, and items online that can later be used offline. Cooperative multiplayer features the option to trade items with other human players regardless of their level.

== Premise ==
Too Human is set in a science fiction reimagining of Norse Mythology, wherein the Norse gods are cybernetically augmented warriors worshipped by so-called mortals, which are non-augmented humans.

Before the Dawn of the Æsir, the machines called the "Children of Ymir" stalked Earth, bent on destroying humanity. As the war escalated, man and machine exchanged nuclear and anti-matter weapons, leaving the world frozen in a thousand-year winter. Humanity now teeters on the brink of extinction. Earth's population is now only a few million sheltered in the walled enclave of Midgard. The machines have prospered in the eternal winter. Humanity, however, is not alone. They pray to the Æsir and faithfully worship the great Organically Distributed Intelligence Network or Odin for short. As protectors, it is the Æsir's duty to ensure humanity survives. Their enhanced bodies and minds make them more powerful compared to humans, and they are properly revered as gods.

== Development ==
=== Early versions ===
Too Human was announced by the developer Silicon Knights in 1999 to be released on the PlayStation, with a first teaser showing during E3 that same year. Unlike its eventual format on the Xbox 360 as a single disc, the game was to be released across four CD-ROMs bundled together (a similar format to that of Final Fantasy VIII released in 1999). Also unlike the finished product, the plot, while involving the theme of human cybernetic enhancements, was to be set in the distant future of 2450 AD instead of the alternate science fiction take on Norse mythology.

Development halted when Nintendo announced an exclusive partnership with Silicon Knights, and the game was moved to the GameCube in 2000. Prototyping for the game took place on the GameCube, but the staff at Silicon Knights soon devoted their efforts towards two other releases, Eternal Darkness: Sanity's Requiem and Metal Gear Solid: The Twin Snakes, with no further news of Too Human, without any indication of future development being announced until five years later in 2005.

=== Xbox 360 development ===
Development once again shifted to the Xbox 360 when Silicon Knights announced a partnership with Microsoft in May 2005, which included plans to develop Too Human into a trilogy. Despite initial development on the console, the game did not meet its original planned release date for "a 2006 holiday", with development continuing for an additional two years. The budget for the game has been estimated to be between US$ 60-100 million.

As well as releasing many other promotional videos Silicon Knights was involved in the making of a fictional documentary titled The Goblin Man of Norway. The film was reported to be produced by the "Norwegian Film Committee", and is in three parts, with each part being released sequentially. The first part - Excavation - relates the discovery of a high technology mechanical man possibly tens of thousands of years old found encased in a glacier. The second part, titled Examination, contains pictures of the discovery as well as a stone found nearby with a message of doom or curse runically inscribed. The third part, Exhibition, shows the release of the find to the public and includes reactions from various people as to the impact the technology could have on society.

The demo was released on Xbox Live on July 14, 2008, as part of the Microsoft "Bringing it Home" E3 Marketplace content. The demo included the Champion class, and gameplay was restricted to part of a single level with cutscenes included, which was only playable in single player. The demo also featured an easter egg where the Commando and Berserker classes become playable by setting the console date to 2009. Later, as of July 25 the Berserker became available for the demo without any clock modification, as did the Commando class later on August 11. The Too Human demo exceeded 900,000 downloads according to Microsoft. It said the demo has "been downloaded more than any other action demo on Xbox Live Marketplace in its first week of availability and [had] been one of the top played titles on Xbox Live overall".

=== Unreal Engine dispute ===
In May 2005, Silicon Knights and Epic Games announced that Silicon Knights would be using Epic's Unreal Engine 3 for all of their next-gen projects. Early development of the Xbox 360 incarnation of Too Human began on various incomplete versions of the engine.

On July 19, 2007, Silicon Knights sued Epic Games due to "breach of contract", including "inadequacies" of Epic's support, service, and cooperation with Silicon Knights concerning Unreal Engine 3. Among claims, Silicon Knights accused Epic of missing the deadline to provide a fully functional version of their engine. In August, Epic Games counter-sued Silicon Knights for copyright infringement, breach of contract and misappropriation of trade secrets. Epic Games prevailed in the lawsuit and won its counter-suit for $4.45 million on May 30, 2012. As a result, Silicon Knights was forced to recall and destroy all unsold copies of their Unreal Engine games, including Too Human. This resulted in Silicon Knights canceling upcoming games that were set to use the Unreal Engine as a base engine.

In January 2013, Silicon Knights served a recall notice to Microsoft to remove Too Human from the Xbox Marketplace (now known as the Xbox Games Store). Despite this, in June 2019, Microsoft re-released Too Human on the Xbox Games Store as a free title and made it backward compatible with the Xbox One.

== Reception ==
Reception

Aggregate scores
| Aggregator | Score |
|---|---|
| GameRankings | 68.59% |
| Metacritic | 65/100 |

Review scores
| Publication | Score |
|---|---|
| 1Up.com | C− |
| Edge | 6/10 |
| Eurogamer | 6/10 |
| Game Informer | 6.75/10 |
| GamePro | 4/5 |
| GameRevolution | C+ |
| GameSpot | 5.5/10 |
| GameTrailers | 6.5/10 |
| IGN | 7.8/10 |
| Official Xbox Magazine (UK) | 7/10 |
| Official Xbox Magazine (US) | 6.5/10 |
| TeamXbox | 6.5/10 |
| X-Play | 4/5 |

Upon the game's release, Too Human received a mediocre to fair reception from critics with an average review score of 68.59% at GameRankings and 65/100 at Metacritic. NPD Group reports that the game sold approximately 168,200 copies during the month of August 2008 in North America; it was the eighth best-selling game in the region during that time. Too Human "sold around 700,000 units" quoted from Denis Dyack in a Joystiq interview.

The game's concept of mixing science fiction with Norse mythology was praised by critics with X-Play saying while it "sounds like a stretch, on the whole, it works" where "the art direction manages to seamlessly blend the grandeur we think of with this mythology and make it come alive again with a healthy dose of futurism". IGN found it to do "a great job of keeping you engrossed in the game". It found the game's audio to be its stronger part, calling the music and voice acting "top-notch". Graphically, GameSpot was most impressed with the environments that "feature excellent detail and lighting, with towering statues lording over the proceedings and shafts of light spilling onto mounds of snow". However it did note "each setting seems much like the last", with "stiff combat and facial animations [that] become more and more noticeable", a point Game Revolution echoed by stating "the game begins strongly with some stunning art design throughout the first level" before becoming too familiar.

Response to the game's unconventional use of the right analog stick for combat was mixed. Some critics, like GamePro, found it to make the game more "slick", while GameTrailers called it "broken", likening it to button mashing. While Game Informer liked the idea, the change, it felt, made other aspects of the game worse, notably the camera control and lock-on system for projectile weaponry. In general, most critics dislike the analog stick configuration, arguing that it removes manual camera control.

A common criticism was directed at the death sequence where a Valkyrie collects the player's body as being too long. Official Xbox Magazine called it a "sheer annoyance", with other critics like TeamXbox jokingly wondering the game's total play time if the sequence was skippable. Official Xbox Magazine UK however, while finding it "frustrating" felt that it prevented players from abusing the respawn system as result. Eurogamer felt the game's biggest problem was its relatively short length for its genre. As with other critics, 1UP.com found the addition of cooperative multiplayer made the game more entertaining. While agreeing, Edge concluded: "The irony is that many of Too Human's problems wouldn't exist if another pair of human players were allowed to enter the fold (as was originally intended)", referencing the previous feature of four player multiplayer being absent in the finished product. GameDaily declared Too Human the "Underperformer of the Year" as they "expected the years of development time to turn out something better than this".
