= Eternal Darkness =

2002 video game

Eternal Darkness: Sanity's Requiem
- Canadian cover art
- Developer: Silicon Knights
- Publisher: Nintendo
- Director: Denis Dyack
- Producers: Denis Dyack; Shigeru Miyamoto; Satoru Iwata; Kenji Miki
- Designers: Brad Furminger; Ted Traver
- Programmers: James O'Reilly; Doug Tooley; Gina Grossi; Carey Murray
- Artist: Ken McCulloch
- Writers: Denis Dyack; Ken McCulloch
- Composer: Steve Henifin
- Platform: GameCube
- Release: NA: June 24, 2002; JP: October 25, 2002; EU: November 1, 2002; AU: November 7, 2002
- Genre: Survival horror
- Mode: Single-player

Eternal Darkness: Sanity's Requiem is a 2002 horror game developed by Silicon Knights and published by Nintendo for the GameCube. It was produced and directed by Denis Dyack. The game follows the story of several characters across a period of two millennia and four different locations on Earth, as they contend with an ancient evil who seeks to enslave humanity. The gameplay distinguishes itself with unique "sanity effects", visual and audial effects that confuse the player and often break the fourth wall.

Development on Eternal Darkness began after Nintendo, impressed with Silicon Knights' Blood Omen: Legacy of Kain (1996), contacted the company to propose a collaboration on an original mature title. Silicon Knights based their concept around Lovecraftian horror and the Eternal Champion concept, and decidedly avoided making a survival horror game. It was originally planned for the Nintendo 64, and was mostly completed before development was moved to Nintendo's forthcoming home console, the GameCube. It was the first game published by Nintendo to receive an M (Mature) rating from the Entertainment Software Rating Board (ESRB).

While Eternal Darkness was widely acclaimed by critics and won numerous awards, the game was not a commercial success, selling less than 500,000 copies worldwide. A direct sequel to the game was explored but never materialized, and Silicon Knights went bankrupt and disbanded in 2013. Attempts by Dyack to make a spiritual successor entitled Shadow of the Eternals with his new studio Precursor Games failed both of their Kickstarter campaigns, leading to the project being placed on indefinite hold. In the years since Eternal Darkness' release, it has been regarded as one of the greatest video games of all time, as well as one of the best horror games ever made.

== Gameplay ==
The game is conducted from a third-person perspective. It has an in-game map which tracks the player's bearings. The inventory system stores weapons and items that can be used to solve puzzles, some of which can be combined with other objects, even enchanted with magick, for different effects.

Combat focuses on a simple targeting system. Players may attack in a general direction, or lock-on to an enemy to focus on individual parts of its anatomy. Decapitating most enemies effectively blinds them. There are many classes of enemies the player must either defeat or avoid. Each class also comes in a few varieties, and subtle differences between each variety exist as well, having slightly different appearances and traits. Some of the more common enemies vary very little in appearance, usually only changing in hue and aesthetics, but may have some behavioral differences. Boss and mini-boss enemies, however, tend to vary quite significantly.

The narrative of the game's story switches between two phases. The main phase focuses on a series of chapters in which players take control of a new character each time. The other phase acts as an intermission, exploring the mansion in order to find chapter pages and other items in order to progress. The game boasts twelve playable characters, split between four distinct locations, and from different periods of time, at times in anachronic order. Each of these characters are different in terms of the game's three main parameters – health, sanity, and magick – and have access to a small selection of weapons that they can use in combat, though what they can use is determined by the time period that they lived in. For example, characters from the more ancient eras are restricted to mostly melee weapons such as swords, with the occasional crossbow or throwable. Meanwhile, characters from the colonial era onwards have more access to ranged weapons, including modern-day firearms.

The story features multiple paths that can be taken at the end of the first chapter. This choice not only determines which of the game's other three antagonists are aligned to the plot, but it also has subtle effects on the gameplay in chapters and intermission periods. Some changes include slight differences in puzzles and items, but most changes revolve around enemy placement, which will determine how the player engages them. This can even have an effect on the relative difficulty of the game in certain situations. Red tinted enemies for example, are generally tougher, having more health and dealing more damage, making that story path a kind of unofficial hard mode. After the game is completed down one path, it becomes unavailable in future playthroughs, until the player completes all three paths.

The crafting menu allows the player to experiment and discover new spells.

Magick can be used by most characters and consists of spells that can be used to damage opponents, protect characters and heal them, and be used to solve certain puzzles. The player is also able to assign spells to buttons for quick-use during the game. After discovering a spell it can be used in subsequent chapters and intermission periods. All spells are fundamentally affected by what alignment rune is used to power them. The game incorporates four types – Red, Green, Blue, and Purple. Each alignment affects spells on a specific parameter. On top of that, they operate on a rock-paper-scissors principle of gameplay. All spells require the player to combine a series of Runes together in order to cast them. Runes can be freely experimented with by the player. This robust mechanic of experimentation has been praised by game critics as unique, and something that sets the magick system in this apart from most magic systems of most other game titles.

=== "Sanity Effects" ===
A distinctive gameplay aspect comes from "Sanity Effects", the game's standout concept that Nintendo patented in 2005. Upon beginning the game's second chapter, players must keep watch on a Sanity meter – a green bar which decreases when the player is spotted by an enemy. As the bar becomes low, subtle changes to the environment and random unusual events begin to occur, which reflect the character's slackening grip on reality.

Minor effects include a variety of things, such as a skewed camera angle, heads of statues following the character, and unsettling noises. Stronger effects include bleeding on walls and ceilings, entering a room that is unrealistic before finding that the character never left the previous room, or the character suddenly dying. Fourth wall breaking effects such as "To Be Continued" promotions for a "sequel", and simulated errors and anomalies of the TV or GameCube can happen either from low or depleted sanity, or by a scripted event. While the latter does not affect gameplay, they can be misconstrued by the player as being actual technical malfunctions.

== Story ==
The story of Eternal Darkness takes place over four fictional locations which the game moves between. They include the "Forbidden City" underground temple complex in Persia; a Khmer temple in Angkor Thom, Cambodia; Oublié Cathedral in Amiens, France; and the Roivas Family Estate in Rhode Island, which leads to an ancient underground city named Ehn'gha beneath the mansion. The story moves between these locations, with each chapter occurring during a different time period (between 26 B.C. and 2000 A.D.), and from the perspective of a different character. The chapters in the game are not in chronological order.

=== Plot ===
In 2000 AD, Alexandra Roivas returns to her family's estate in Rhode Island after her grandfather, Edward Roivas, her only living relative, is found brutally murdered. Two weeks later, the local police have gotten nowhere with the investigation. Alex decides to investigate the mansion for clues, and stumbles upon a secret room containing a book bound with human skin called the Tome of Eternal Darkness. Deciding to read it, she finds it contains accounts of various people in the past, beginning with the story of Pious Augustus in 26 BC.

Pious, a respected Roman military commander, is sent to Ancient Persia to locate an important relic. Lured away from his men by mysterious voices, Pious ventures into an underground temple complex called the Forbidden City. He comes across three artifacts. Each possesses the essence of powerful godlike beings referred to as "The Ancients": Chattur'gha, Xel'lotath and Ulyaoth. Upon attempting to touch one of the artifacts, Pious finds himself corrupted by its power, resulting in him becoming undead yet gaining a significant amount of power, whereupon he pledges his allegiance to the artifact's Ancient and begins working on summoning them into the universe. The remaining two artifacts that Pious did not claim were put out of Pious' reach. One of the other artifacts represents the Ancient that is stronger than Pious', and the other represents the Ancient weaker than Pious'.

The artifact representing the weaker Ancient remained in the Forbidden City. In 565 AD, a young swordsman named Karim, ventures to the Forbidden City to locate a treasure for Chandra, a woman that he loves. Upon finding it, and learning more about it from the enlightened spirit of the recently murdered Chandra, Karim sacrifices himself in order to guard it with her. Pious returns to Persia in the Middle Ages to construct a Pillar of Flesh at the Forbidden City, as part of his master's plans. In 1460 AD, Roberto Bianchi, a Venetian architect traveling through the region, is captured by Pious under the guise of a warlord. While under involuntary servitude, surveying the site of the monument's construction, he encounters the spirit of Karim, who entrusts him with the artifact in his possession. Roberto attempts to warn Pious of the dangers within but is thrown into the tower, becoming part of its foundation along with many others. Centuries later in 1991 AD, a Canadian firefighter named Michael Edwards works with his team to extinguish several major oil fires in the Middle East, following the end of the Gulf War. After an explosion killed his entire team and trapped him in the Forbidden City, he is approached by Roberto's spirit, who gives him the artifact and instructs him to take it to the Roivas Family Estate. Michael then moves to destroy the Forbidden City with a magickally enhanced bomb. A few years later, Michael delivers the artifact to Edward Roivas in secret, telling him that "[he] won't last the night".

The artifact representing the stronger Ancient is later moved, by Pious, to Oublié Cathedral, in Amiens, France in order to prevent it from being used against him. First, though, Pious orders the assassination of Charlemagne, so his movement cannot impede his plans. In 814 AD, a Frankish messenger named Anthony, who stumbles upon the plot, travels to the then small monastery in order to warn him of the danger to his life. Despite Anthony's best efforts, he arrives too late to save him and dies from the spell he was afflicted with. When the location is reconstructed into a Cathedral long afterwards, Pious summons a creature called the Black Guardian, to protect the artifact that could defeat his master. In 1485 AD, a Franciscan friar named Paul Luther, visiting the region to view a holy relic at the cathedral, finds himself accused of murdering a fellow friar by the local Inquisition. Attempting to clear his name, he uncovers the dark truth with the Custodian's help. After his ally's brutal sacrifice, Paul alone goes to confront the fake Inquisition's leader. Encountering both the Black Guardian and Pious, who finally sheds his disguise, Paul is promptly killed by the beast. In 1916 AD, during World War I, Oublié Cathedral is converted into a field hospital. Peter Jacob, a field reporter making accounts about the war, notes that patients have been disappearing of late. Venturing into the catacombs searching for answers, he encounters the Black Guardian. Having powerful offensive magick at his disposal, Peter manages to defeat it, recovering the artifact it was guarding. Decades later, Edward Roivas is visited by a now elderly Peter who gives an account of his experience in Amiens before handing over the artifact in his possession.

While the other two artifacts are fought over between Pious and several unwitting souls, the "Corpse God" Mantorok, another powerful Ancient that can oppose Pious' master, has an artifact of its own. In 1150 AD, Pious travels to a temple in Angkor Thom, Cambodia in order to deal with Mantorok. A young Khmer slave girl, named Ellia, finds herself trapped within the temple at the same time. While trying to find her way out, she is approached by one of Mantorok's servants, who entrusts her with the task of protecting the Ancient's essence within her body. Shortly afterwards, Pious interrogates Ellia about the essence and kills her when she refuses to say anything. Centuries later in 1983 AD, Dr. Edwin Lindsey, a noted archaeologist, ventures to Cambodia on an expedition to explore the temple. Edwin is nearly killed by Pious, who disguised himself in order to accompany him, and they separately make their way into the temple, reaching Mantorok at the same time. After Pious is repelled by the Ancient, Edwin finds Ellia's body and is entrusted by her spirit with Mantorok's essence. As instructed, he eventually delivers it to Edward Roivas a few months later.

Alongside the struggle to claim the powerful artifacts of the Ancients, the Roivas Family Estate in Rhode Island, U.S. holds secrets of its own. In 1760 AD, Dr. Maximillian Roivas, a colonial ancestor of Alex and her grandfather, inherits his father's mansion in Rhode Island and decides to investigate its secrets. Performing autopsies on fallen creatures, he records the data in his medical journal. In the basement, Max finds the entrance to a massive cavern beneath the mansion, containing an ancient yet clearly advanced city within called Ehn'gha. Barely managing to defeat a single Guardian, he returns to the surface to get help, only to be considered delirious. Later, believing them to be possessed, Max murders his house servants, after which he is arrested and sent to an asylum for the rest of his life. In 1952 AD, Dr. Edward Roivas, a clinical psychologist at the time, inherits the Estate. Edward is guided by Maximillian's ghost to the mansion's secret room and learns of past events. Knowing what he must do, Edward finds his way underground into Ehn'gha. Exploring the city, Edward discovers it incorporates magick machinery and uses it to completely destroy the city's Guardians with an amplified dispelling spell. Realizing this is not a permanent solution, he decides to research what he can within the Tome to prepare for the final battle. After decades, however, Edward is violently murdered by one of Ehn'gha's replenished Guardians.

Alex, having learned all she can from the Tome, decides to finish the fight. Recovering the artifacts from within the mansion, she soon ventures into Ehn'gha and uses them with the city's machinery, in order to summon a rival Ancient to fight Pious' master. As the planetary alignment occurs, both Ancients appear and immediately clash. Alex then engages Pious in combat, aided by the spirits of those written in the Tome, eventually defeating him and destroying the essence of his master, who is annihilated by its rival. Alex despairs at the possible consequences of summoning the victorious Ancient into the universe, but Edward's spirit acts quickly to use Ehn'gha's mechanism to send the Ancient back before it can cause any harm to the world. Edward apologizes for everything he had to put his granddaughter through, and praises Alex for her courage before finally moving on. Alex then ponders while looking at the Tome.

After completing all three story paths, Edward Roivas narrates a revelation; all three paths are revealed to have occurred simultaneously in separate timelines. One of Mantorok's spheres of influence happens to be chaos, and with it, the ability to subtly manipulate time and space. It created the Tome of Eternal Darkness for its chosen pawns to use, and it turned the other three Ancients against one another in mutual annihilation. Merging the timestreams into one complete victory, now only Mantorok remains, slowly dying, and "plotting".

== Development ==
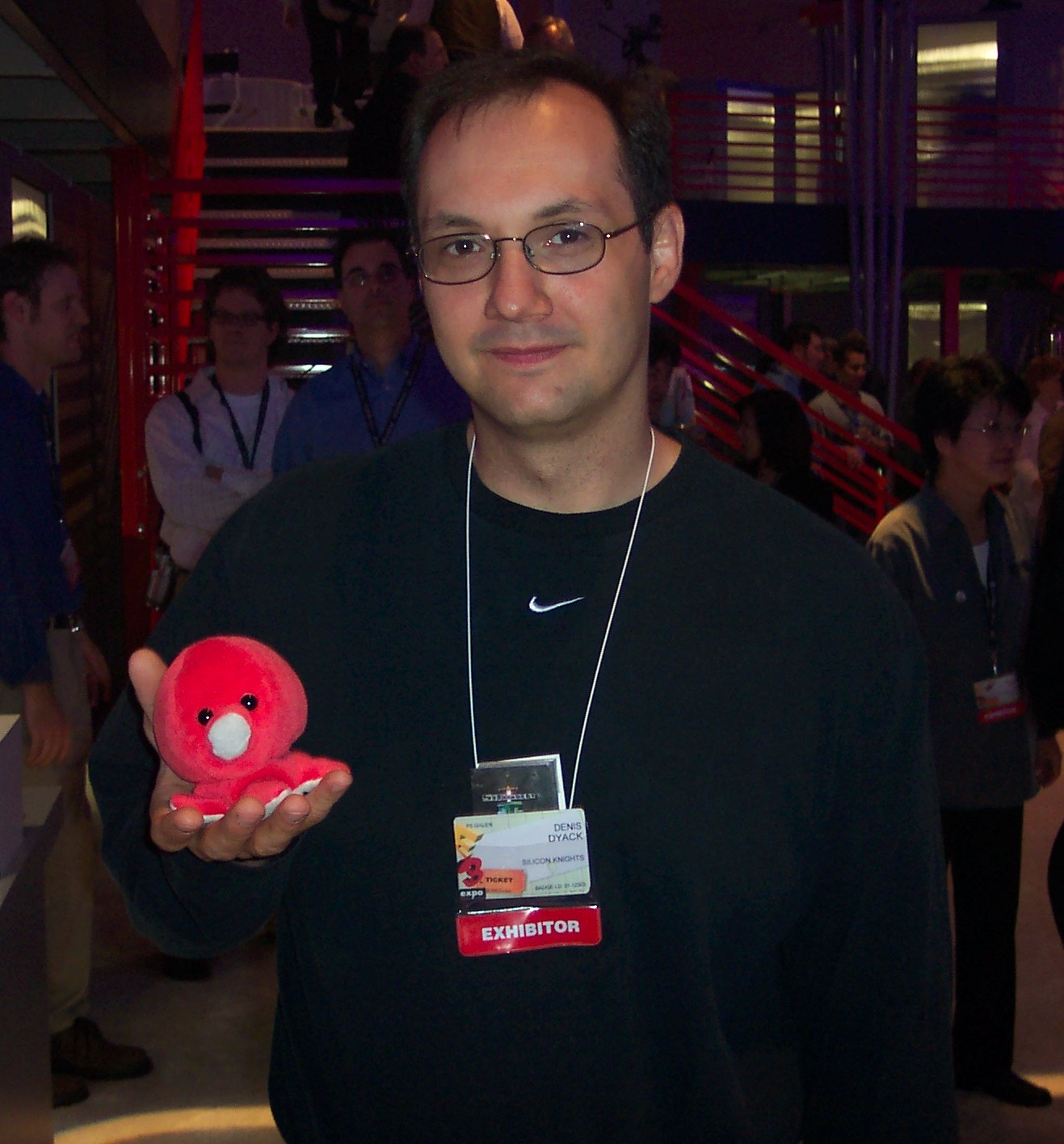
Director and producer Denis Dyack in 2003

Eternal Darkness was developed by Canadian development studio Silicon Knights and published by Japanese game company Nintendo. It was directed and produced by Denis Dyack of Silicon Knights. The project's origins can be traced back to the mid-1990s when Nintendo staff saw Silicon Knights' game Blood Omen: Legacy of Kain (1996) at an E3 gaming convention. Nintendo contacted Silicon Knights, as they had been contemplating adding more mature games to their line-up, and the two companies began collaborating to produce Eternal Darkness. Silicon Knights's concept for the game was to create a horror game that did not fall under the survival horror genre. Dyack claims they went with "a deeper, more classical approach" to horror, calling it a "psychological thriller" as opposed to the "B-movie horror plots" of the Resident Evil series. They also wanted to make a game in response to contemporary video game controversies. Dyack explains: "Video games were under fire for messing with people's heads, and being accused of being murder simulators and stuff. So, we thought, wouldn't it be a good idea to make something that really does mess with people's heads?"

The development team borrowed inspiration from Edgar Allan Poe, Lovecraftian horror, and the Eternal Champion character concept by Michael Moorcock. Dyack, a history buff, also took examples of evil acts done throughout history to help create a believable world. The idea for the sanity system came from the tabletop role-playing game Call of Cthulhu. The concept was planned from the start, but the sanity effects were challenging to implement, and be approved by Nintendo. Dyack believed that Nintendo was worried players may interpret the sanity effects as an indication of faulty hardware, or may inadvertently cause damage to the hardware as a result of the effects. For example, a player prompted with a message saying their memory card was being formatted may hastily take out the memory card from the system, causing actual damage to it. Nintendo patented the sanity system in 2005.

The game was originally in development for the Nintendo 64 (N64). The team used 3D Studio Max for modelling and Photoshop for textures. It would have required a large capacity N64 Game Pak, including full voice recordings for cinematic sequences, and a surround sound option. It would have supported (but not required) the N64 Expansion Pak accessory for additional memory. By 2000, much of development had been completed, and it was presented and playable at industry trade shows. However, support for the Nintendo 64 was declining in anticipation for Nintendo's upcoming new home console, the GameCube. With several months remaining to finish the game, Nintendo decided to move development over to the GameCube. According to lead designer Ted Traver, Nintendo wanted more games in its GameCube lineup, and the cost of manufacturing cartridges was much higher than optical discs. For the transition of development to GameCube, the rendering engine, development tools, sound, and art assets all needed to be redone. While the work was difficult, the new hardware granted the team greater polygon rendering capacity, and more memory for textures. It was originally planned to be a launch title, but development was delayed.

As development was concluding, Nintendo sent game designers to Silicon Knights to help improve the gameplay. When the September 11 attacks occurred, Silicon Knights opted to remove the character Joseph De Molay, a Templar knight, from the game. The Templar knights were known for taking part in the Crusades, retaking formerly Christian lands in the Middle East. In the interest of not appearing offensive, Joseph was replaced with an oil well firefighter, and all Arab writing in texture images was removed. The Middle Eastern environments were retained.

== Release ==
Eternal Darkness: Sanity's Requiem was first released and published by Nintendo on June 24, 2002 in North America, October 25 in Japan, November 1 in Europe, and November 7 in Australia. It was the first Nintendo-published game to receive an M (Mature) rating from the Entertainment Software Rating Board (ESRB), the video game ratings board in North America. All of their previously published games had lighter content ratings.

=== Short films ===
In 2002, Nintendo and Hypnotic, a film entertainment company, established a filmmaking contest in which contestants submitted ideas that would be later funded into short films if selected. Hypnotic also purchased the rights to produce a film or TV series based on the IP.

The contest drew over 500 submissions. Ten finalists were selected and were granted $2,000 each to produce their respective short films. The grand prize for the contest was $20,000, and was selected by a panel of industry experts. The finalists were unveiled between May 23 and July 4, 2002.

The grand prize winner of the contest was Patrick Daughters, for the film Unloved. The viewer's choice award went to the film Cutting Room Floor by Tyler Spangler and Michael Cioni.

== Reception ==
=== Reviews and sales ===
Reception

Aggregate scores
Aggregator	Score
GameRankings	91%
Metacritic	92/100

Review scores
Publication	Score
AllGame	3.5/5
Eurogamer	9/10
Famitsu	9/10, 8/10, 7/10, 8/10
Game Informer	9.5/10
GameSpot	9.4/10
IGN	9.6/10
Nintendo Power	5/5, 3/5, 4/5, 3/5, 5/5
Famitsu Cube + Advance	8/10, 8/10, 9/10, 9/10

Eternal Darkness: Sanity's Requiem received critical acclaim upon its release, with aggregated review scores of over 9/10 at both GameRankings and Metacritic. Upon review, IGN gave Eternal Darkness one of its Editor's Choice Awards and, in its review of the game, stated: "Simply put, an amazing achievement that shouldn't be overlooked. Games do not come any better than this".

The game was reviewed for the Japanese magazine Famitsu Cube + Advance. The four reviewers all complimented the story as engaging, with one reviewer specifically found it engaging how the stories and characters gardually weave themselves together. One reviewer said the combat scenes were somewhat repetitive while another said that running in the game was awkward. While all reviewers said the game was strictly for adults, one said that this would limit the game's audience.

AllGame editor Scott Alan Marriott described Eternal Darkness as "fun" and "certainly worth playing". Mild criticism was noted for its "linear gameplay" and "low difficulty". The game received a mostly positive score from Nintendo Power, with Alan Averill calling the game "intelligent, challenging, and always intriguing."

Eternal Darkness sold less than 500,000 copies worldwide. In Japan, the game has sold 17,748 copies as of December 31, 2006. In Canada, the game sold 20,000 copies.

=== Awards ===
Eternal Darkness was awarded with "Outstanding Achievement in Character or Story Development" during the 6th Annual Interactive Achievement Awards; it also received nominations for "Console Game of the Year", "Outstanding Innovation in Console Gaming", "Outstanding Achievement in Art Direction", and "Outstanding Achievement in Sound Design". GameSpot named it the best video game of June 2002. At GameSpot's Best and Worst of 2002, it was awarded "Best Sound on GameCube", "Best Story on GameCube", and "Best Graphics (Artistic) on GameCube"; the game was also nominated for "Best Music on GameCube", "Best Action Adventure Game on GameCube", and "Game of the Year on GameCube". GameSpy's Game of the Year Awards gave it their honorary "Day of the Tentacle (Cthulhu) Award".

=== Retrospective ===
In 2006, Nintendo Power ranked Eternal Darkness as the 101st top game on Nintendo systems, while the readers of IGN had it voted as the 96th best video game of all time on all systems; in 2009, Official Nintendo Magazine had it listed as the 48th best Nintendo game. The game was ranked as the seventh best game for the GameCube by X-Play in 2006, as the fifth best GameCube game by IGN in 2007, and placed fourth on the list of top GameCube games in the January 2009 issue of Game Informer.

Both Game Informer and X-Play in 2007 and 2006 ranked it as the fifth scariest game of all time. Alex Roivas was included among the 50 greatest heroines in video games by Tom's Games in 2007 and ranked as the 40th greatest heroine in video game history by Complex in 2013.

Several retrospective articles demanded a follow-up game. IGN included Eternal Darkness on their 2008 list of "horror franchises that should rise from the grave", GamesRadar included Eternal Darkness among the games "with untapped franchise potential" in 2009, and UGO included it on a similar list of games "that need sequels" in 2010.

== Legacy ==
Alex Roivas makes a cameo appearance in the 2018 fighting game Super Smash Bros. Ultimate as one of the many "Spirits" that players can collect. The battle associated with Alex's Spirit sees the player needing to defeat Zero Suit Samus from the Metroid series while the screen is mirrored at random intervals. The patent for the sanity system expired in 2021.

=== Cancelled sequel ===
In 2006, Dyack said "absolutely yes" in response to the question of a possible sequel. He stated that Silicon Knights had intended for Eternal Darkness to be a stand-alone game, but they wanted to make more games set in the same universe involving the Ancients. At Microsoft's Spring 2008 Showcase, Dyack said there was a "strong chance" they would return to the Eternal Darkness brand. In 2011, Silicon Knights said they were refocusing on one of their most requested titles for the next generation of consoles. This, combined with the fact that Nintendo had trademarked the title once again, spawned rumors that an Eternal Darkness game would be a launch title for Nintendo's Wii U console. However, the project was cancelled due to Silicon Knights' legal troubles with Epic Games. Any possibility for a sequel from Silicon Knights ended in 2013 when Silicon Knights filed for bankruptcy and closed its offices. Nintendo has repeatedly renewed the Eternal Darkness trademark, stirring rumors of sequels or re-releases.

=== Shadow of the Eternals ===
In May 2013, Precursor Games, staffed by many former Silicon Knights members, had begun a crowdfunding campaign on their website, seeking $1.5 million to create a spiritual successor to Eternal Darkness under the title Shadow of the Eternals, to be released for Microsoft Windows and Wii U. The game was to be released in twelve 2-4 hour long episodes, with Dyack acting as the game's chief creative officer. The same month, a secondary fundraising campaign was launched on Kickstarter, aiming to receive $1.35 million within 36 days. Eventually, being only halfway through their campaign in early June, the company decided to shut down both funding campaigns whilst refunding all the accumulated money back to their contributors, and promised to relaunch a new campaign a few weeks later. They said this was to reveal "a host of new exciting opportunities that will make the game better than [Precursor Games] envisioned". Later in June, Precursor's founding member, and co-designer of both Eternal Darkness and Shadow of the Eternals, Kenneth McCulloch was arrested and pleaded guilty on charges of child pornography; the studio immediately severed all ties with him.

Another Kickstarter campaign was launched in July, aiming for a $750,000 goal this time. Instead of twelve episodes, the game was intended to be released as one 8-10 hour experience. The game would follow detective Paul Becker as he investigated a gang massacre in Louisiana, and uncovered the truth about the "Eternals". It would span over 2500 years of history in Hungary, England, Egypt, and the United States. In creating the look of the game, Precursor Games purchased art assets from Silicon Knights which were going to be used in the Eternal Darkness sequel. Though Nintendo still owns the rights to Eternal Darkness and the patent for the game's unique "Sanity Meter" at the time, Precursor Games was in communication with Nintendo, who was supportive of the project. In September, Shadow of the Eternals was delayed indefinitely due to a lack of funding. The Escapist described the multiple failed crowdfunding campaigns as a "circus" and demonstrated a lack of faith in the developers. Kyle Hilliard of Game Informer wrote that he was not surprised the game was put on hold, as it has been "plagued with issues" since its first announcement.

In October 2014, Dyack had created a new entertainment company Quantum Entanglement Entertainment. One of the company's first projects was to relaunch the development for Shadow of the Eternals. Dyack was also considering Shadow of the Eternals as a film and television property. In January 2018, QEE was quietly shut down and the production of Shadow of the Eternals was cancelled. Dyack renamed the company as Apocalypse Studios and announced a new role-playing game titled Deadhaus Sonata. Dyack described it as combining elements of his previous games, including "Lovecraftian overtones from Eternal Darkness".
