= 1990 =

1990 in various calendars
- Gregorian calendar: 1990; MCMXC
- Ab urbe condita: 2743
- Armenian calendar: 1439; ԹՎ ՌՆԼԹ
- Assyrian calendar: 6740
- Baháʼí calendar: 146–147
- Balinese saka calendar: 1911–1912
- Bengali calendar: 1396–1397
- Berber calendar: 2940
- British Regnal year: 38 Eliz. 2 – 39 Eliz. 2
- Buddhist calendar: 2534
- Burmese calendar: 1352
- Byzantine calendar: 7498–7499
- Chinese calendar: 己巳年 (Earth Snake); 4687 or 4480 — to — 庚午年 (Metal Horse); 4688 or 4481
- Coptic calendar: 1706–1707
- Discordian calendar: 3156
- Ethiopian calendar: 1982–1983
- Hebrew calendar: 5750–5751
- Hindu calendars
- Vikram Samvat: 2046–2047
- Shaka Samvat: 1911–1912
- Kali Yuga: 5090–5091
- Holocene calendar: 11990
- Igbo calendar: 990–991
- Iranian calendar: 1368–1369
- Islamic calendar: 1410–1411
- Japanese calendar: Heisei 2 (平成２年)
- Javanese calendar: 1922–1923
- Juche calendar: 79
- Julian calendar: Gregorian minus 13 days
- Korean calendar: 4323
- Minguo calendar: ROC 79 民國79年
- Nanakshahi calendar: 522
- Thai solar calendar: 2533
- Tibetan calendar: ས་མོ་སྦྲུལ་ལོ་ (female Earth-Snake); 2116 or 1735 or 963 — to — ལྕགས་ཕོ་རྟ་ལོ་ (male Iron-Horse); 2117 or 1736 or 964
- Unix time: 631152000 – 662687999

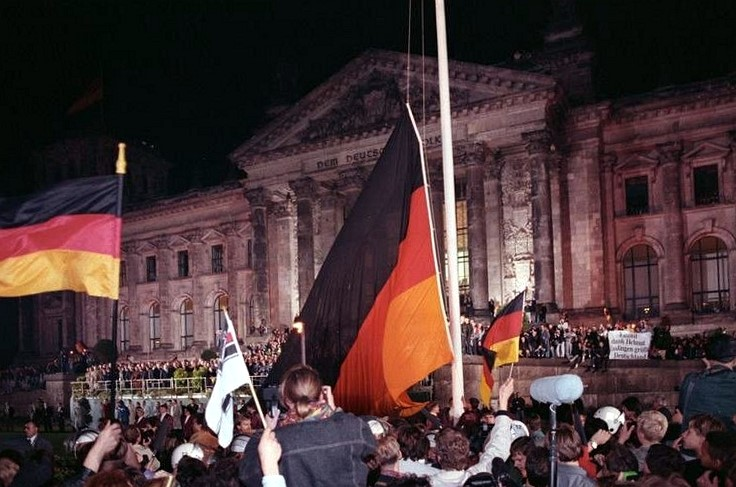
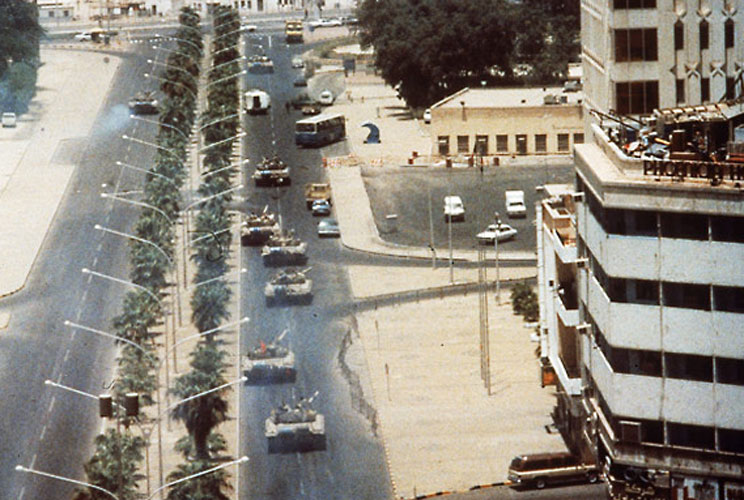
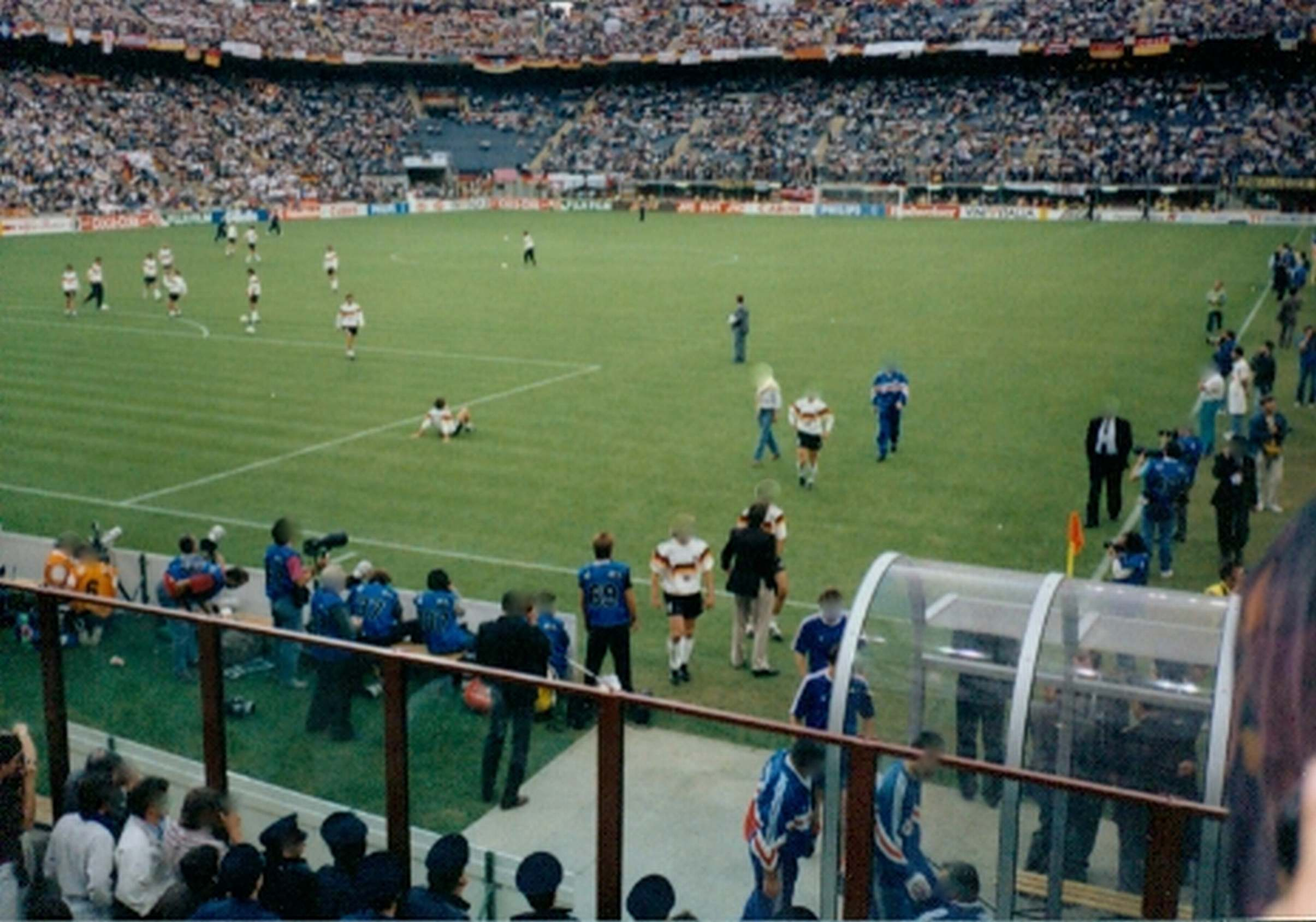
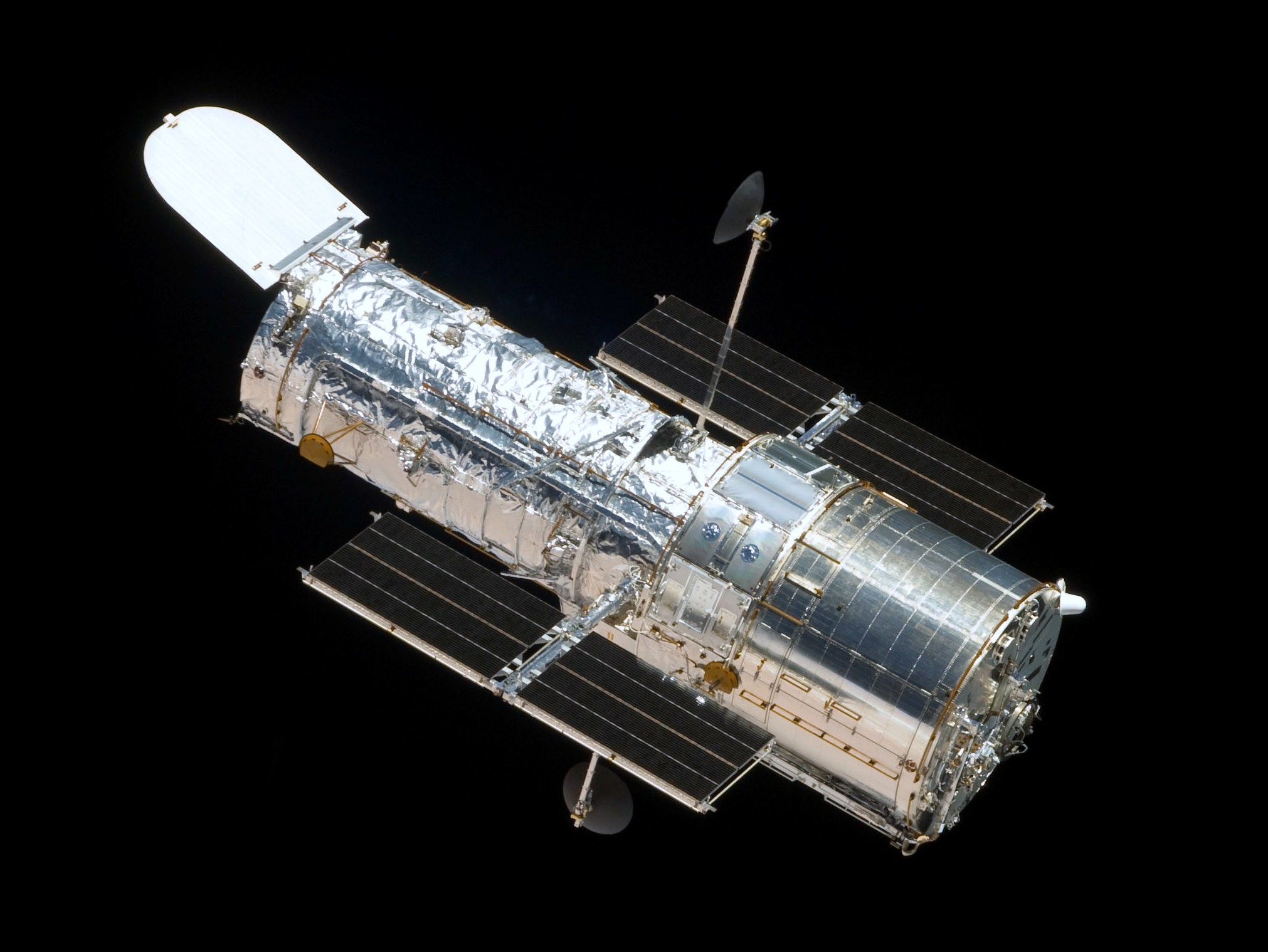
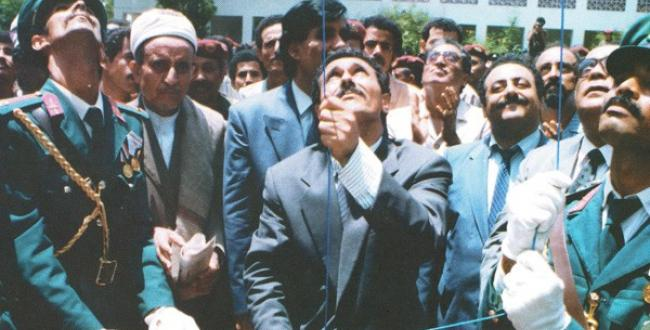
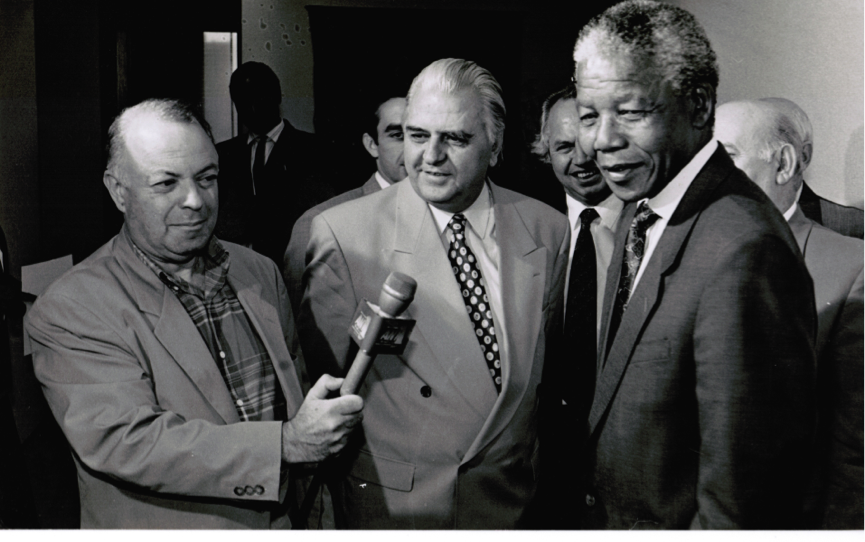
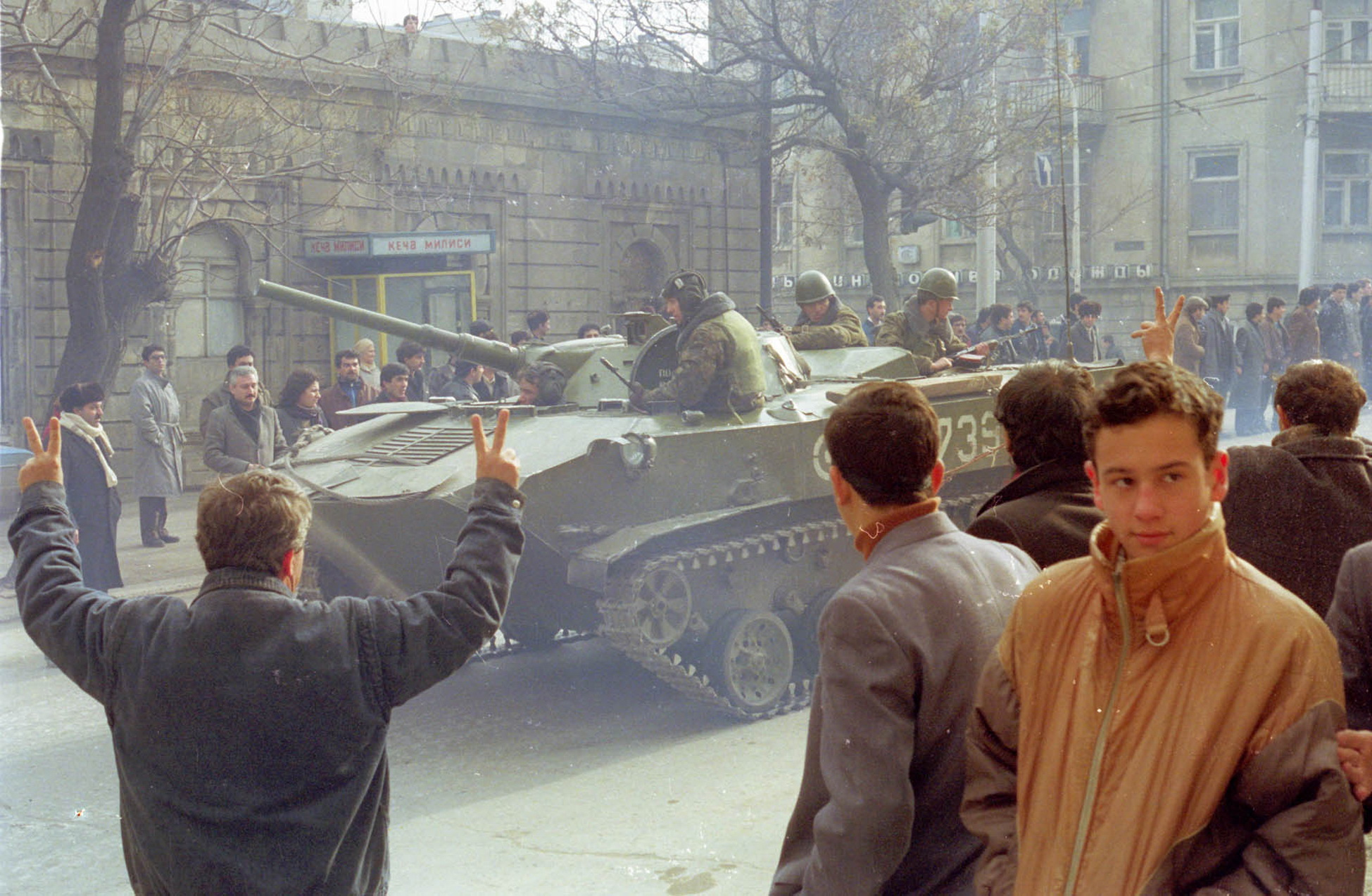
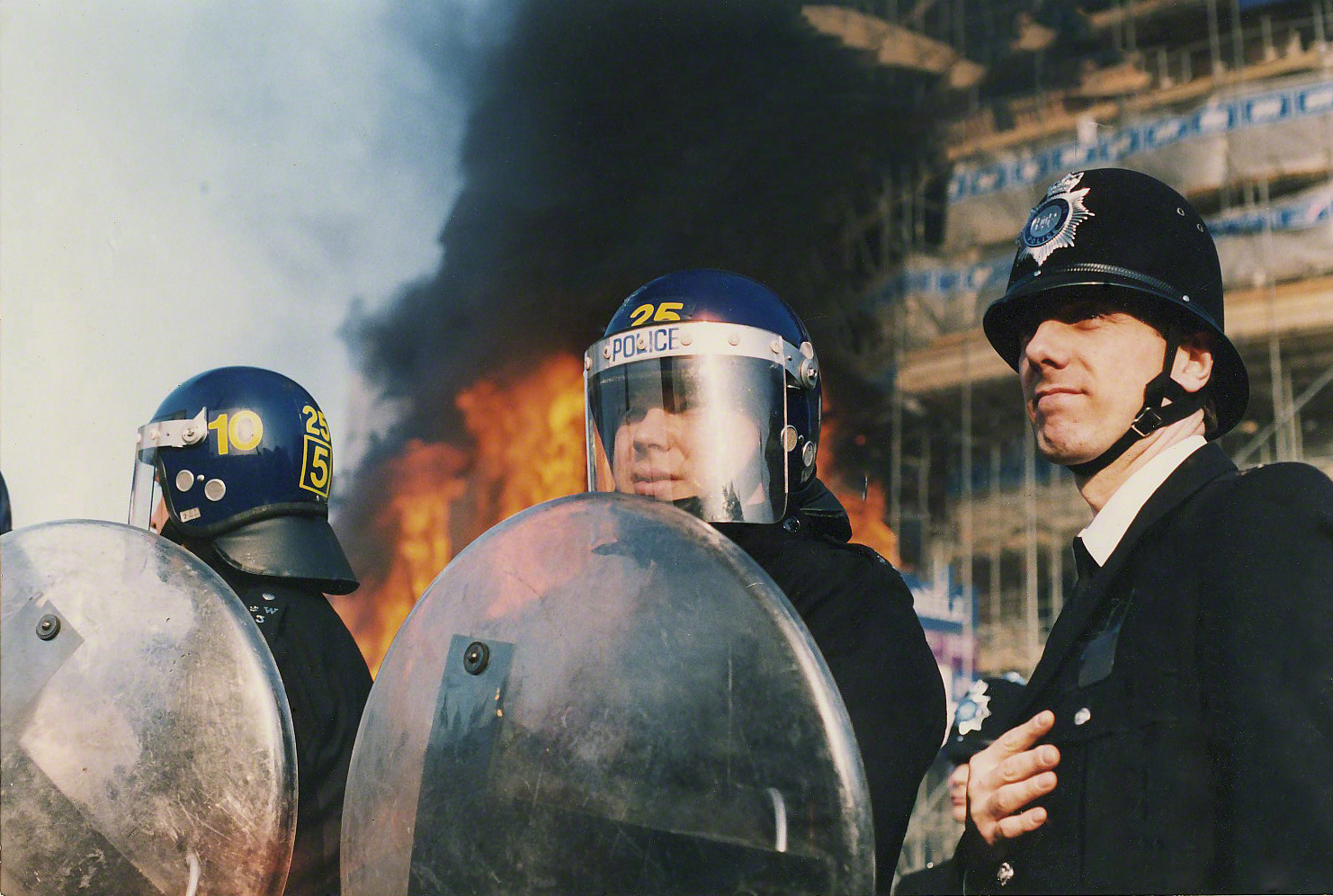
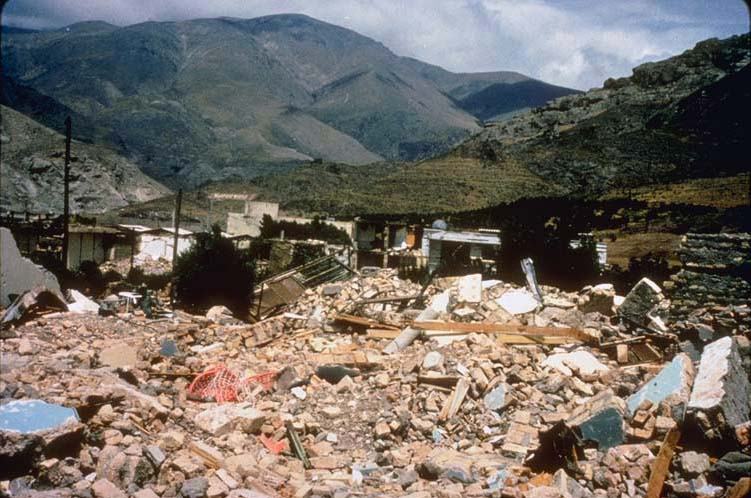
From top to bottom, left to right: German reunification takes place, formally ending the division of East Germany and West Germany; the Gulf War begins following Iraq's invasion of Kuwait; the 1990 FIFA World Cup is held in Italy and won by West Germany; the Hubble Space Telescope is launched into orbit; Yemeni unification occurs, merging North Yemen and South Yemen into the Republic of Yemen; Nelson Mandela is released after 27 years in prison in South Africa; Black January sees a violent crackdown by Soviet troops in Baku, Azerbaijan, killing hundreds; the Poll Tax Riots erupt across the United Kingdom in opposition to the community charge; and the 1990 Manjil–Rudbar earthquake kills tens of thousands in Iran.

1990 (MCMXC) was a common year starting on Monday of the Gregorian calendar, the 1990th year of the Common Era (CE) and Anno Domini (AD) designations, the 990th year of the 2nd millennium, the 90th year of the 20th century, and the 1st year of the 1990s decade.

Important events of 1990 include the Reunification of Germany and the unification of Yemen, the formal beginning of the Human Genome Project (finished in 2003), the launch of the Hubble Space Telescope, the separation of Namibia from South Africa, and the Baltic states declaring independence from the Soviet Union during Perestroika. Yugoslavia's communist regime collapses amidst increasing internal tensions and multiparty elections held within its constituent republics result in separatist governments being elected in most of the republics marking the beginning of the breakup of Yugoslavia. Also in this year began the crisis that would lead to the Gulf War in 1991 following the Iraq invasion and the largely internationally unrecognized annexation of Kuwait. This led to Operation Desert Shield being enacted with an international coalition of military forces being built up on the Kuwaiti-Saudi border with demands for Iraq to peacefully withdraw from Kuwait. Also in this year, Nelson Mandela was released from prison, and Margaret Thatcher resigned as Prime Minister of the United Kingdom after more than 11 years.

1990 was an important year in the Internet's early history. In late 1990, Tim Berners-Lee created the first web server and the foundation for the World Wide Web. Test operations began around December 20 and it was released outside CERN the following year. 1990 also saw the official decommissioning of the ARPANET, a forerunner of the Internet system and the introduction of the first content web search engine, Archie, on September 10.

September 14, 1990, saw the first case of successful somatic gene therapy on a patient.

Due to the early 1990s recession that began that year and uncertainty due to the collapse of the socialist governments in Eastern Europe, birth rates in many countries stopped rising or fell steeply in 1990. In most western countries the Echo Boom peaked in 1990; fertility rates declined thereafter.

== Events ==
=== January ===
- January 1
  - Poland becomes the first country in Eastern Europe to begin abolishing its state socialist controls.
  - Glasgow begins its year as European Capital of Culture.
  - The first Internet companies catering to commercial users, PSINet and EUnet begin selling Internet access to commercial customers in the United States and Netherlands respectively.
  - The comedy television series of Rowan Atkinson's Mr. Bean first airs on ITV in the United Kingdom.
- January 2 – Ramiz Ali declares that the rejection of Communism will not be repeated in Albania, but that the changing European political climate will nevertheless require adjustments.
- January 3 – United States invasion of Panama: General Manuel Noriega is deposed as leader of Panama and surrenders to the American forces.
- January 10 – McDonnell Douglas MD-11 wide-body trijet airliner takes its first flight, in the US.
- January 11 – Singing Revolution: In the Lithuanian SSR, 300,000 demonstrate for independence.
- January 12–19 – Most of the remaining 50,000 Armenians are driven out of Baku in the Azerbaijan SSR during the Baku pogrom.
- January 13 – Douglas Wilder becomes the first elected African American governor in the US as he takes office in Richmond, Virginia.
- January 15
  - The National Assembly of Bulgaria votes to end one party rule by the Bulgarian Communist Party.
  - Thousands storm the Stasi headquarters in East Berlin in an attempt to view their government records.
  - Martin Luther King Day Crash: Telephone service in Atlanta, St. Louis and Detroit, including 9-1-1 service, goes down for nine hours, due to an AT&T software bug.
- January 18
  - McMartin preschool trial: Peggy McMartin Buckey and Raymond Buckey are acquitted of 52 charges related to alleged ritual abuse taking place at their daycare in Manhattan Beach, California.
  - Marion Barry, Mayor of the District of Columbia, is caught on videotape smoking crack cocaine.
- January 20
  - Cold War: Black January – Soviet troops occupy Baku, Azerbaijan SSR, under the state of emergency decree issued by General Secretary of the Communist Party of the Soviet Union Mikhail Gorbachev, and kill over 130 protesters who were demonstrating for independence. The Nakhichevan Autonomous Soviet Socialist Republic declares its independence from the USSR.
  - Clashes break out between Indian troops and Muslim separatists in Kashmir.
  - The government of Haiti declares a state of emergency, under which it suspends civil liberties, imposes censorship and arrests political opponents. The state of siege is lifted on January 29.
- January 22 – US graduate student Robert Tappan Morris is convicted of releasing the Morris worm onto the internet.
- January 23 – The 14th and final Extraordinary Congress of the Yugoslav Communist Party concludes after 3 days. Although Serb hardliners block substantial reforms, the Party signals its openness to multiparty elections. Slovene delegates, protesting the slow pace of reforms, walk out of the assembly.
- January 25
  - Avianca Flight 052 crashes into Cove Neck, New York after a miscommunication between the flight crew and JFK Airport officials, killing 73 people on board.
  - Prime Minister of Pakistan Benazir Bhutto gives birth to a girl, becoming the first modern head of government to bear a child while in office.
  - Pope John Paul II begins an eight-day tour of Cape Verde, Guinea-Bissau, Mali, Burkina Faso and Chad.
- January 25–26 – The Burns' Day Storm kills 97 in northwestern Europe.
- January 27 – The city of Tiraspol in the Moldavian SSR briefly declares independence.
- January 28 – Four months after their exit from power, the Polish United Workers' Party votes to dissolve and reorganize as the Social Democracy of the Republic of Poland.
- January 29 – The trial of Joseph Hazelwood, former skipper of the Exxon Valdez, begins in Anchorage, Alaska. He is accused of negligence that resulted in America's second worst oil spill to date.
- January 31
  - Globalization – The first McDonald's in Moscow, Russian SFSR opens 8 months after construction began on May 3, 1989. 8 months later the first McDonald's in Mainland China is opened in Shenzhen.
  - President of the United States George H. W. Bush gives his first State of the Union address and proposes that the U.S. and the Soviet Union make deep cuts to their military forces in Europe.

=== February ===
- February/March – 100,000 Kashmiri Pandits leave their homeland in Jammu and Kashmir's Valley after being targeted by Islamist extremists.
- February – Smoking is banned on all cross-country flights in the United States.
- February 2 – Apartheid: F. W. de Klerk announces the unbanning of the African National Congress and promises to release Nelson Mandela.
- February 5 – The Roman Catholic Archdiocese of Washington, D.C. excommunicates George Augustus Stallings for starting the controversial Imani Temple congregation.
- February 7
  - The Communist Party of the Soviet Union votes to end its monopoly of power, clearing the way for multiparty elections.
  - In the Tajik SSR, the Dushanbe riots break out against the settlement of Armenian refugees there.
- February 9 – The ADtranz low floor tram, the world's first completely low-floor tram, is introduced in Bremen.
- February 10
  - Las Cruces bowling alley massacre: 2 people walk into the 10 Pin Alley in Las Cruces, New Mexico (known at this time as the Las Cruces Bowl) and shoot seven people, four of whom are killed. The case is never solved.
  - As the German chancellor Helmut Kohl is on a state visit in Moscow, Mikhail Gorbachev assures him that the Germans have the right to choose reunification. While the question of the membership of a reunited Germany in the existing military alliances is still unresolved, this is seen as a major breakthrough.
- February 11
  - Nelson Mandela is released from Victor Verster Prison, near Cape Town, South Africa, after 27 years behind bars.
  - Buster Douglas, a 42-1 underdog, knocks out Mike Tyson in the 10th round to win the heavyweight boxing title.
- February 12 – Representatives of NATO and the Warsaw Pact meet in Ottawa for an "Open Skies" conference. The conference results in agreements about superpower troop levels in Europe and on German reunification.
- February 13
  - German reunification: An agreement is reached for a two-stage plan to reunite Germany.
  - US investment bank Drexel Burnham Lambert files for bankruptcy protection, Chapter 11.
- February 14
  - The Pale Blue Dot photograph of Earth is sent back from the Voyager 1 probe after completing its primary mission, from around 5.6 billion kilometers (3.5 billion miles) away.
  - Indian Airlines Flight 605, an Airbus A320-231 registered as VT-EPN, crashes shortly before landing at Bangalore, killing 92 out of the 146 occupants on board.
- February 15
  - The United Kingdom and Argentina restore diplomatic relations after 8 years. The UK had severed ties in response to Argentina's invasion of the Falkland Islands, a British Dependent Territory, in 1982.
  - In Cartagena, Colombia, a summit is held between President of the United States George H. W. Bush, President of Bolivia Jaime Paz Zamora, President of Colombia Virgilio Barco Vargas, and President of Peru Alan García. The leaders pledge additional cooperation in fighting international drug trafficking.
- February 21 – Spain grants Protestantism and Judaism legal equality with the Roman Catholic Church.
- February 25 – The Sandinistas are defeated in the Nicaraguan elections, with Violeta Chamorro elected as the new president of Nicaragua (the first elected woman president in the Americas), replacing Daniel Ortega.
- February 26 – The Soviet Union agrees to withdraw all 73,500 troops from Czechoslovakia by July, 1991.
- February 27 – Exxon Valdez oil spill: Exxon and its shipping company are indicted on 5 criminal counts.
- February 28
  - President of Nicaragua Daniel Ortega announces a cease-fire with the U.S.-backed contras.
  - Final day of the rum ration in the Royal New Zealand Navy, the last in any of the world's navies.

=== March ===
- March 1
  - A fire at the Sheraton Hotel in Cairo, Egypt, kills 16 people.
  - Steve Jackson Games is raided by the U.S. Secret Service, prompting the later formation of the Electronic Frontier Foundation.
  - Luis Alberto Lacalle, a grandson of the late politician and diplomat Luis Alberto de Herrera, is sworn in as President of Uruguay.
- March 3 – The International Trans-Antarctic Scientific Expedition, a group of six explorers from six nations, completes the first dog sled crossing of Antarctica.
- March 8 – The Nintendo World Championships are held within the Fair Park's Automobile Building, kickstarting an almost year long gaming competition across 29 American cities.
- March 9
  - Police seal off Brixton in South London after another night of protests against the poll tax.
  - Newfoundland Premier Clyde Wells confirms he will rescind Newfoundland's approval of the Meech Lake Accord.
- March 10 – Prosper Avril is ousted in a coup in Haiti, eighteen months after seizing power.
- March 11
  - Singing Revolution: The Lithuanian SSR declares independence from the Soviet Union with the Act of the Re-Establishment of the State of Lithuania.
  - Augusto Pinochet hands over power to the elected president Patricio Aylwin, marking the beginning of the Chilean transition to democracy after 17 years of the military dictatorship of Chile.
- March 11–13 – The March 1990 Central United States tornado outbreak produces 64 tornadoes across six US states, including four violent F4/F5 tornadoes. The outbreak leaves 2 dead, 89 injured, and causes over $500 million in damages.
- March 12 – Cold War: Soviet soldiers begin leaving Hungary under terms of an agreement to withdraw all Soviet troops by June 1.
- March 13 – The Supreme Soviet of the Soviet Union approves changes to the Constitution of the Soviet Union to create a strong U.S.-style presidency. Mikhail Gorbachev is elected to a five-year term as the first-ever President of the Soviet Union on March 15.
- March 15
  - Iraq hangs Iranian journalist Farzad Bazoft for spying. Daphne Parish, a British nurse, is sentenced to 15 years' imprisonment as an accomplice.
  - Singing Revolution: The Soviet Union announces that Lithuania's declaration of independence is invalid.
  - Fernando Collor de Mello takes office as President of Brazil, Brazil's first democratically elected president since Jânio Quadros in 1961. The next day, he announces a currency freeze and freezes large bank accounts for 18 months.
- March 18
  - Twelve paintings and a Shang dynasty vase, collectively worth $100 to $300 million, are stolen from the Isabella Stewart Gardner Museum in Boston, Massachusetts by two thieves posing as police officers.
  - Cold War: East Germany holds its first free elections.
- March 19–21 – Skirmishes between Romanians and Hungarians, also known as the ”Black March” events, take place in the city of Târgu Mureș, Romania, leaving five people dead.
- March 20 – Ferdinand Marcos's widow, Imelda Marcos, goes on trial for bribery, embezzlement, and racketeering.
- March 21 – After 75 years of South African rule since World War I, Namibia becomes independent.
- March 24 – 1990 Australian federal election: Bob Hawke's Labor government is re-elected with a reduced majority, narrowly defeating the Liberal/National Coalition led by Andrew Peacock.
- March 25
  - In New York City, a fire due to arson at an illegal social club called "Happy Land" kills 87 people.
  - Archbishop of Canterbury Robert Runcie announces his intention to retire at the end of the year.
  - In the Hungarian parliamentary election, Hungary's first multiparty election since 1948, the Hungarian Democratic Forum wins the most seats.
- March 26 – The 62nd Academy Awards, hosted by Billy Crystal, are held at the Dorothy Chandler Pavilion in Los Angeles, California, with Driving Miss Daisy winning Best Picture.
- March 27 – The United States begins broadcasting Radio y Televisión Martí to Cuba.
- March 28 – U.S. President George H. W. Bush posthumously awards Jesse Owens the Congressional Gold Medal.
- March 30 – Singing Revolution: After its first free elections on March 18, the Estonian SSR declares the Soviet rule to have been illegal since 1940 and declares a transition period for full independence.
- March 31 – "The Second Battle of Trafalgar": A massive anti-poll tax demonstration in Trafalgar Square, London, turns into a riot; 471 people are injured, and 341 are arrested.

=== April ===
- April 1
  - The Community Charge (poll tax) takes effect in England and Wales amid widespread protests.
  - Strangeways Prison riot: The longest prison riot in Britain's history begins at Strangeways Prison in Manchester, and continues for 3 weeks and 3 days, until April 25.
  - The 1990 United States census begins. There are 248,709,873 residents in the U.S.
- April 6 – Robert Mapplethorpe's "The Perfect Moment" show of nude and homoerotic photographs opens at the Cincinnati Contemporary Arts Center, in spite of accusations of indecency by Citizens for Community Values.
- April 7
  - Iran–Contra affair: John Poindexter is found guilty of 5 charges for his part in the scandal; the convictions are later reversed on appeal.
  - MS Scandinavian Star, a Bahamas-registered ferry, catches fire en route from Norway to Denmark, leaving 158 dead.
- April 8
  - In Nepal, Birendra of Nepal lifts a ban on political parties following violent protests.
  - In the Greek legislative election, the conservative New Democracy wins the most seats in the Hellenic Parliament; its leader, Konstantinos Mitsotakis, becomes Prime Minister of Greece on April 11.
  - In the Socialist Federal Republic of Yugoslavia, the Socialist Republic of Slovenia holds Yugoslavia's first multiparty election since 1938. After the election, a center-right coalition led by Lojze Peterle forms Yugoslavia's first non-Communist government since 1945.
- April 9 – Comet Austin makes its closest approach to the sun.
- April 12 – Lothar de Maizière becomes prime minister of East Germany, heading a grand coalition that favors German reunification.
- April 13 – Cold War: The Soviet Union apologizes for the Katyn massacre.
- April 14 – Junk bond financier Michael Milken pleaded guilty to fraud-related charges. He agreed to pay US$500 million in restitution and was sentenced on November 21 to 10 years in jail.
- April 19 – Washington, DC post-hardcore band Fugazi release their debut studio album Repeater on Dischord Records.
- April 20 – 17-year-old Christopher Kerze goes missing in Eagan, Minnesota. He remains missing as of May 2024.
- April 21 – Japanese Yoshio Tani, M.Sc. murders gold merchant Turkka Elovirta and businessman Juhani Komulainen in Siuntio, Finland, having convinced them to buy a nonexistent 500 kilogram stash of Nazi gold.
- April 22
  - Lebanon hostage crisis: Lebanese kidnappers release American educator Robert Polhill, who had been held hostage since January 1987.
  - Earth Day 20 is celebrated by millions worldwide.
- April 24
  - Cold War: West Germany and East Germany agree to merge currency and economies on July 1.
  - STS-31: The Hubble Space Telescope is launched aboard Space Shuttle Discovery.
  - President of Zaire Mobutu Sese Seko lifts a 20-year ban on opposition parties.
- April 25 – Violeta Chamorro is sworn in as President of Nicaragua, the first woman elected (February 25) in her own right as a head of state in the Americas.
- April 26 – A 7.0 earthquake shakes the Chinese province of Qinghai leaving 126 dead.
- April 30 – Lebanon hostage crisis: Lebanese kidnappers release American educator Frank H. Reed, who had been held hostage since September 1986.

=== May ===
- May 1 – The former Episcopal Church in the Philippines (supervised by the Episcopal Church) is granted full autonomy and raised to the state of an Autocephalous Anglican province and renamed the Episcopal Church of the Philippines.
- May 2 – In London, a man brandishing a knife robs a courier of bearer bonds worth £292 million.
- May 2–4 – First talks between the government of South Africa and the African National Congress.
- May 4 – Singing Revolution: The Latvian SSR declares independence from the Soviet Union.
- May 8
  - Singing Revolution: The Estonian SSR restores the formal name of the country, the Republic of Estonia, as well as other national emblems (the coat of arms, the flag and the anthem).
  - Rafael Ángel Calderón Fournier assumes office as President of Costa Rica.
- May 9 – In South Korea, police battle anti-government protesters in Seoul and two other cities.
- May 13
  - In the Philippines, gunmen kill two United States Air Force airmen near Clark Air Base on the eve of talks between the Philippines and the United States over the future of American military bases in the Philippines.
  - The Dinamo–Red Star riot takes place at Stadion Maksimir in Zagreb, Croatia between the Bad Blue Boys (fans of GNK Dinamo Zagreb) and the Delije (fans of Red Star Belgrade).
- May 15
  - Singing Revolution: The pro-Soviet Intermovement attempts to take power in Tallinn, Estonia, but is forced down by local Estonians.
  - Portrait of Dr. Gachet by Vincent van Gogh is sold for a record $82.5 million.
- May 17 – The World Health Organization removes homosexuality from its list of diseases.
- May 18 – German reunification: East Germany and West Germany sign a treaty to merge their economic and social systems, effective July 1.
- May 19 – The US and the USSR agree to end production of chemical weapons and to destroy most of their stockpiles of chemical weapons.
- May 20 – Cold War: The first post-Communist presidential and parliamentary elections are held in Romania.
- May 21 – In Kashmir, Indian security forces open fire on mourners carrying the body of Mohammad Farooq Shah who had been assassinated earlier. At least 47 people are killed.
- May 22
  - Cold War: The leaders of the Yemen Arab Republic and the People's Democratic Republic of Yemen announce the unification of their countries as the Republic of Yemen.
- May 27
  - In the Burmese general election, Burma's first multiparty election in 30 years, the National League for Democracy led by Aung San Suu Kyi wins in a landslide, but the State Law and Order Restoration Council nullifies the election results.
  - In the Colombian presidential election, César Gaviria is elected President of Colombia; he takes office on August 7.
- May 28 – 1990 Arab League summit: Saddam Hussein receives the emir of Kuwait for a diplomatic visit, at a time when his country and its decent oil revenues are being pushed into bankruptcy by Kuwait's lowering of the price of oil. A dictator with ambitions, Saddam wants to continue increasing his military strength, and so confronts Kuwait instead. After the public events, Hussein invites Arab leaders to a private meeting. Here, he threatens war on Kuwait unless Kuwait stops lowering the price of oil, recalls then-Iraqi foreign minister Tariq Aziz.
- May 29
  - Mikhail Gorbachev arrives in Ottawa for a 29-hour visit.
  - Boris Yeltsin is elected as the first ever elected president of the Russian Soviet Federative Socialist Republic.
  - European Bank for Reconstruction and Development (EBRD) is founded.
- May 30 – George H. W. Bush and Mikhail Gorbachev begin a four-day summit meeting in Washington, D.C.

=== June ===
- June 1
  - Cold War: U.S. President George H. W. Bush and Soviet President Mikhail Gorbachev sign a treaty to end chemical weapon production and begin destroying their respective stocks.
  - Members of the Provisional Irish Republican Army shoot and kill Major Michael Dillon-Lee and Private William Robert Davies of the British Army. Dillon-Lee is killed outside his home in Dortmund, Germany and Davies is killed at a railway station in Lichfield, England.
- June 2 – The Lower Ohio Valley tornado outbreak spawns 88 confirmed tornadoes in Illinois, Indiana, Kentucky, and Ohio, killing 12; 37 tornadoes occur in Indiana, eclipsing the previous record of 21 during the 1974 Super Outbreak.
- June 3 – The Social Democratic Party (SDP) in the United Kingdom is dissolved after two years of poor results.
- June 4 – Violence breaks out in the Kirghiz SSR between the majority Kyrgyz people and minority Uzbeks over the distribution of homestead land.
- June 7 – Metropolitan Alexy of Moscow is elected Russian Orthodox Patriarch of Moscow and all Rus'.
- On June 7 Universal Studios Florida opens to the public along with Nickelodeon Studios.
- June 8
  - The 1990 FIFA World Cup begins in Italy. This was the first broadcast of digital HDTV in history; Europe would not begin HDTV broadcasting en masse until 2004.
  - Prime Minister of Israel Yitzhak Shamir ends 88 days with only an acting government by forming a coalition of right-wing and religious parties led by Shamir's Likud party.
- June 8–9 – In the Czechoslovak parliamentary election, Czechoslovakia's first free election since 1946, the Civic Forum wins the most seats but fails to secure a majority.
- June 9 – Mega Borg oil spill in the Gulf of Mexico near Galveston, Texas.
- June 10
  - Alberto Fujimori is elected President of Peru; he takes office on July 28.
  - First round of the Bulgarian Constitutional Assembly election sees the Bulgarian Socialist Party win a majority. The second round of voting is held June 17.
- June 11 – Sri Lankan Civil War: The Liberation Tigers of Tamil Eelam massacre over 600 unarmed police officers in the Eastern Province.
- June 12
  - Cold War: The Congress of People's Deputies of Russia formally declares its sovereignty.
  - In the Algerian local elections, Algeria's first multiparty election since 1962, the Islamic Salvation Front wins control of more than half of municipalities and 32 of Algeria's 48 provinces.
- June 13 – Cold War: The destruction of the Berlin Wall by East Germany officially starts, 7 months after it was opened the previous November.
- June 13–15 – June 1990 Mineriad: Clashes break out in Bucharest between supporters and opponents of the ruling National Salvation Front.
- June 14 – 1990 Panay earthquake: An earthquake measuring M_{s} 7.1 struck Panay in the Philippines, killing 8 and injuring 41.
- June 15 – Dublin Regulation on treatment of applications for right of asylum under European Union law agreed (comes into force 1997).
- June 17–30 – Nelson Mandela tours North America, visiting 3 Canadian and 8 U.S. cities.
- June 19 – The Communist Party of the Russian Soviet Federative Socialist Republic holds its inaugural conference in Moscow.
- June 21 – The 7.4 M_{w} Manjil–Rudbar earthquake affects northern Iran with a maximum Mercalli intensity of X (Extreme), killing 35,000–50,000, and injuring 60,000–105,000.
- June 22 – Cold War: Checkpoint Charlie is dismantled.
- June 23 – In Canada, the Meech Lake Accord of 1987 dies after the Manitoba and Newfoundland legislatures fail to approve it ahead of the deadline.
- June 24 – Kathleen Margaret Brown and Irene Templeton are ordained as priests in St Anne's Cathedral in Belfast, becoming the first female Anglican priests in the United Kingdom.

=== July ===
- July 1
  - German reunification: East Germany and West Germany merge their economies, the West German Deutsche Mark becoming the official currency of the East also. The Inner German border (constructed 1945) also ceases to function.
  - Argentina announces the sale of its state-owned airline, Aerolineas Argentinas, to Spanish airline Iberia. The sale will be completed in November.
- July 2
  - 1990 Mecca tunnel tragedy: A stampede in a pedestrian tunnel leading to Mecca kills 1,426.
  - A U.S. District Court acquits Imelda Marcos on racketeering and fraud charges.
- July 3 – Angola's ruling party MPLA agrees to legalize opposition and hold multiparty elections.
- July 4 – Commonwealth v. Twitchell: David and Ginger Twitchell are convicted of involuntary manslaughter in Massachusetts after the 1986 death of their 2-year-old son, who died from a bowel obstruction after the couple withheld medical treatment in keeping with their Christian Science beliefs.
- July 5 – In Kenya, riots erupt against the Kenya African National Union's monopoly on power.
- July 6
  - President of Bulgaria Petar Mladenov resigns over accusations that he ordered tanks to disperse anti-government protests in December 1989.
  - Somali President Siad Barre's bodyguards massacre anti-government demonstrators during a soccer match; 65 people are killed, more than 300 seriously injured.
- July 7–8 – In tennis, Martina Navratilova of the United States wins the 1990 Wimbledon Championships – Women's singles and Stefan Edberg of Sweden wins the 1990 Wimbledon Championships – Men's singles.
- July 8
  - 1990 FIFA World Cup final (Association football): West Germany defeats Argentina 1–0 to win the 1990 FIFA World Cup.
  - At 12:34:56 (a.m. and p.m.), the date and time using American formats was 12:34:56, 7/8/90 (1234567890). The next such event will occur on July 8, 2090.
- July 9–11 – The 16th G7 summit is held in Houston, Texas.
- July 10 – The UEFA lifts the five-year ban on English association football teams competing in Continental Europe after the Heysel Stadium disaster, although Liverpool F.C. will remain banned for a further three years.
- July 11 – Terrorists blow up a passenger bus travelling from Kalbajar to Tartar in Azerbaijan. 14 people are killed, 35 wounded.
- July 12 – Foster v British Gas plc decided in the European Court of Justice, a leading case on the definition of the "state" under European Union law.
- July 13 – The Lenin Peak disaster occurs when an earthquake triggers an avalanche in the Pamir Mountains with the loss of 43 lives.
- July 16
  - 1990 Luzon earthquake: An earthquake measuring M_{w} 7.7 kills more than 2,400 in the Philippines.
  - By the end of June, Saddam and his lieutenants suspect a conspiracy against Iraq, devised by Kuwait and orchestrated by the US. Earlier in July they threaten invasion on Kuwait unless $10 billion is sent to Iraq from Kuwait. When Kuwait refuses, on July 16, Iraqi forces begin to gather in southern Iraq near the Iraqi-Kuwaiti border.
- July 21-22 – The Min Ping Yu No. 5540 incident occurs when the Taiwan Garrison Command forces 76 mainland Chinese illegal immigrants into sealed holds of a boat, causing 25 to die of suffocation.
- July 22 – First round of the Mongolian parliamentary election, the first multiparty ever held in Mongolia; the Mongolian People's Party wins by a wide margin after the second round of voting on July 29.
- July 25
  - George Carey, Bishop of Bath and Wells, is named as the new Archbishop of Canterbury in the Church of England.
  - The Serb Democratic Party (Croatia) declares the sovereignty of the Serbs in Croatia.
  - Roseanne Barr sings "The Star-Spangled Banner" extremely poorly, causing controversy.
- July 26 – U.S. President George H. W. Bush signs the Americans with Disabilities Act, designed to protect disabled Americans from discrimination.
- July 27
  - The parliament building and a government television house in Port of Spain, Trinidad and Tobago are stormed by the Jamaat al Muslimeen in a coup d'état attempt which lasts five days. Approximately 26 to 30 people are killed and several are wounded (including the prime minister, A. N. R. Robinson, who is shot in the leg).
  - Cold War: Belarus declares its sovereignty, a key step toward independence from the Soviet Union.
- July 28 – Alberto Fujimori becomes president of Peru.
- July 30 – British politician and former Member of Parliament Ian Gow is assassinated by a Provisional Irish Republican Army car bomb outside his home in England.

=== August ===
- August 1
  - The National Assembly of Bulgaria elects Zhelyu Zhelev as the first non-Communist President of Bulgaria in 40 years.
  - RELCOM is created in the Soviet Union by combining several computer networks. Later in August, the Soviet Union got its first connection to the Internet.
- August 2
  - Gulf War: Iraq invades Kuwait, eventually leading to the Gulf War.
  - The first ban of smoking in bars in the US (and possibly the world) is passed in San Luis Obispo, California.
- August 6
  - Gulf War: With United Nations Security Council Resolution 661 the United Nations Security Council orders a global trade embargo against Iraq in response to its invasion of Kuwait.
  - President of Pakistan Ghulam Ishaq Khan dismisses Prime Minister of Pakistan Benazir Bhutto, accusing her of corruption and abuse of power.
  - The South African government and ANC begin talks on ending Apartheid.
- August 8
  - Iraq announces its formal annexation of Kuwait.
  - The government of Peru announces an austerity plan that results in huge increases in the price of food and gasoline. The plan sets off days of rioting and a national strike on August 21.
- August 10
  - Egypt, Syria, and 10 other Arab states vote to send military forces to Saudi Arabia to discourage an invasion from Iraq.
  - A passenger bus, traveling along the route "Tbilisi-Agdam", is blown up; 20 people are killed and 30 are injured. The organizers of the crime were Armenians A. Avanesian and M. Tatevosian who were brought to criminal trial.
- August 12
  - In South Africa, fighting breaks out between the Xhosa people and the Zulu people; more than 500 people are killed by the end of August.
  - "Sue", the best preserved Tyrannosaurus rex specimen ever found, is discovered near Faith, South Dakota, United States, by Sue Hendrickson.
- August 15 – In Latvia, Viktor Tsoi, co-founder and lead singer of the Soviet rock band Kino, dies in a car accident on the Sloka–Talsi highway.
- August 21 – The Gambia, Ghana, Guinea, Nigeria, and Sierra Leone send peacekeepers to intervene in the First Liberian Civil War.
- August 23 – East Germany and West Germany announce they will unite on October 3.
- August 24
  - The Armenian SSR declares its independence from the Soviet Union.
  - Northern Ireland writer Brian Keenan is released from Lebanon after being held hostage for nearly 5 years.
  - Indonesian commercial television network SCTV was established as the nation's third television station after RCTI, and also debuted as local television channel in Surabaya. During its earlier days, SCTV was the rival for RCTI, the first commercial television network. SCTV began broadcasting nationwide from Jakarta by January 29, 1991.
- August 26 – In Sofia, protesters set fire to the headquarters of the governing Bulgarian Socialist Party.
- August 28 – The Plainfield Tornado (F5 on the Fujita scale) strikes the towns of Plainfield, Crest Hill, and Joliet, Illinois, killing 29 people (the strongest tornado to date to strike the Chicago metropolitan area).

=== September ===
- September 1–10 – Pope John Paul II visits Tanzania, Burundi, Rwanda and Ivory Coast.
- September 2 – Cold War: Transnistria declares its independence from the Moldavian SSR; however, the declaration is not recognized by any government.
- September 4 – Geoffrey Palmer resigns as Prime Minister of New Zealand and is replaced by Mike Moore.
- September 4–6 – Premier of North Korea Yon Hyong-muk meets with President of South Korea Roh Tae-woo, the highest level contact between leaders of the two Koreas since 1945.
- September 5 – Sri Lankan Civil War: Sri Lankan Army soldiers massacre 158 civilians.
- September 6 – In Myanmar, the State Law and Order Restoration Council orders the arrest of Aung San Suu Kyi and five other political dissidents.
- September 9
  - U.S. President Bush and Soviet President Gorbachev meet in Helsinki to discuss the Persian Gulf crisis.
  - First Liberian Civil War: Liberian president Samuel Doe is captured by rebel leader Prince Johnson and killed in a filmed execution.
  - Sri Lankan Civil War: Sri Lankan Army soldiers massacre 184 civilians in Batticaloa.
- September 10 – The first Pizza Hut opens up in the Soviet Union.
- September 11
  - Gulf War: U.S. President George H. W. Bush delivers a nationally televised speech in which he threatens the use of force to remove Iraqi soldiers from Kuwait.
  - First Pizza Hut opens in the People's Republic of China, nearly 3 years after the first KFC opened there in 1987.
- September 12
  - Cold War: The two German states and the Four Powers sign the Treaty on the Final Settlement with Respect to Germany in Moscow, paving the way for German reunification.
  - A judge in Australia orders the arrest of media tycoon Christopher Skase, former owner of the Seven Network, after he fails to give evidence in a liquidator's examination of failed shipbuilding company Lloyds Ships Holdings, an associate of Skase's Qintex Australia Ltd.
- September 18
  - The International Olympic Committee awards the 1996 Summer Olympics to Atlanta.
  - Provisional Irish Republican Army assassination attempt on the life of Air Chief Marshal Sir Peter Terry at his home near Stafford, England. Hit by at least 9 bullets, the former Governor of Gibraltar survives, as does his wife, Lady Betty Terry, who is also shot (most likely by accident).
- September 24 – The Supreme Soviet of the Soviet Union grants Gorbachev special powers for 18 months to secure the Soviet Union's transition to a market economy.
- September 27 – David Souter is confirmed to serve on the Supreme Court, replacing retiring Justice William J. Brennan Jr..
- September 29
  - Washington National Cathedral is finished.
  - The Tampere Hall, the largest concert and congress center in the Nordic countries, was inaugurated in Tampere, Finland.
- September 29–30 – The United Nations World Summit for Children draws more than 70 world leaders to United Nations Headquarters.
- September 30 – The New Revised Standard Version of the Bible is officially introduced.

=== October ===
- October
  - Tim Berners-Lee begins his work on the World Wide Web, 19 months after his seminal 1989 outline of what would become the Web concept.
  - The Messeturm skyscraper in Frankfurt is completed, making it the tallest building in Europe, a distinction it will carry until 1997, when it is surpassed by the Commerzbank Tower, also in Frankfurt.
- October 1
  - The rebel Rwandan Patriotic Front invades Rwanda from Uganda, marking the start of the Rwandan Civil War.
  - The Soviet Union enacts a law permitting religious freedom, ending government interference in religious activity and permitting Soviet citizens to engage in private religious study in their homes.
- October 2 – According to The Civil Aviation of China, two commercial planes collide on the runway at the Guangzhou Baiyun International Airport, Guangdong, China. The total death toll is 128; 53 people were wounded, 97 were rescued.
- October 3 – Cold War: East Germany and West Germany reunify into a single Germany.
- October 4 – Moro conflict: Rebel forces seize two military posts on the island of Mindanao, Philippines before surrendering on October 6.
- October 6 – White supremacist David Duke receives 44% of the vote in the Louisiana Senate race, but ultimately loses the vote to Bennett Johnson.
- October 8
  - Israeli–Palestinian conflict: In Jerusalem, Israeli police kill 17 Palestinians and wound over 100 near the Dome of the Rock mosque on the Temple Mount.
  - Globalization: The first McDonald's restaurant is opened in Mainland China in Shenzhen, near Hong Kong. Since 1979, Shenzhen has been a Special economic zone.
- October 12
  - A leader of the right-wing Pamyat organization is arrested in the Soviet Union for spreading antisemitic hatred.
  - German interior minister Wolfgang Schäuble is shot at during an election campaign event. He survives but will require a wheelchair for the rest of his life.
- October 13 – Lebanese Civil War: Syrian military forces invade and occupy Mount Lebanon, ousting General Michel Aoun's government. This effectively consolidates Syria's 14 year occupation of Lebanese soil and ends the civil war.
- October 14 – Regional elections are held in the five East German states that replace the 14 districts of the GDR. The Christian Democrats become the strongest party in four of the five states while the Social Democrats lead in the state of Brandenburg.
- October 15
  - South Africa ends segregation of libraries, trains, buses, toilets, swimming pools, and other public facilities.
  - United Airlines announces a purchase order of 128 wide-body aircraft from Boeing, including several Boeing 777s, in an order totaling $22 billion, the largest order in aviation history to that point.
- October 17
  - North Kalimantan Communist Party insurgents sign a peace agreement which formally ends 28 years of Communist insurgency in Sarawak.
  - A major financial service of Russia, VTB Bank is founded in Russia SSR, former part of Soviet Union, as predecessor name was Vneshtorg Bank.
- October 19 – The Supreme Soviet approves a "middle course" of economic reform: gradual introduction of market controls.
- October 21 – The remains of the former Estonian head of state, Konstantin Päts, found in the Tver region in Russia, are brought to Tallinn and buried at state expense in the Metsakalmistu cemetery.
- October 22 – Nizhny Novgorod restores its official name from Gorky, Volga Federal District, Russia.
- October 24
  - In the Pakistani general election, Prime Minister Bhutto's Pakistan People's Party loses power to a center-right coalition government led by the Islami Jamhoori Ittehad party.
  - Italian Prime Minister Giulio Andreotti reveals the existence of Operation Gladio, a clandestine NATO "stay-behind" operation in Italy during the Cold War.
- October 27
  - Cold War: The Supreme Soviet of the Kirghiz SSR selects Askar Akayev as the republic's first president.
  - The New Zealand National Party wins the New Zealand general election, and its leader, Jim Bolger, becomes prime minister.
- October 29 – In Norway, the government headed by Prime Minister of Norway Jan P. Syse collapses.
- October 30 – The first transatlantic fiber optic cable TAT-8 fails, causing a slowdown of Internet traffic between the United States and Europe.

=== November ===
- November – The earliest known portable digital camera sold in the United States ships.
- November 2 – British Satellite Broadcasting and Sky Television plc merge to form BSkyB as a result of massive losses.
- November 3 – Gro Harlem Brundtland assumes office as Prime Minister of Norway.
- November 5 – Rabbi Meir Kahane, founder of the far-right Kach movement, is shot dead after a speech at a New York City hotel.
- November 6 – Nawaz Sharif is sworn in as the Prime Minister of Pakistan.
- November 7
  - Indian Prime Minister Singh resigns over losing a confidence vote in the Parliament of India, having lost the support of Hindus who want a Muslim mosque in Ayodhya torn down to build a Hindu temple.
  - Mary Robinson defeats odds-on favorite Brian Lenihan to become the first female President of Ireland.
  - The final military parade to mark the anniversary of the Great October Socialist Revolution takes place in the USSR.
- November 9
  - A new constitution comes into effect in the Kingdom of Nepal, establishing multiparty democracy and constitutional monarchy; this is the culmination of the 1990 People's Movement.
  - The Parliament of Singapore enacts the Maintenance of Religious Harmony Act.
- November 10 – Chandra Shekhar becomes Prime Minister of India as head of a minority government.
- November 12
  - Akihito is enthroned as the 125th emperor of Japan following the death of his father on January 7, 1989.
  - Tim Berners-Lee publishes a more formal proposal for the World Wide Web.
- November 13
  - The first known web page is written.
  - In New Zealand, David Gray kills 13 people in what will become known as the Aramoana massacre.
- November 14
  - Germany and Poland sign a treaty confirming the border at the Oder–Neisse line.
  - Alitalia Flight 404 crashes on approach to Zurich Airport, killing all 46 occupants.
- November 15
  - STS-38: Space Shuttle Atlantis is launched on a classified U.S. military mission.
  - President Bush signed new Clean Air Act, focused on urban pollution and cancer-causing emissions from industrial sources.
  - People's Republic of Bulgaria is dissolved after the seventh Grand National Assembly voted to change the country's name to the Republic of Bulgaria and removed the Communist state emblem from the national flag.
- November 17 – Soviet President Gorbachev proposes a radical restructuring of the Soviet government, including the creation of a Federal Council to be made up of the heads of the 15 Soviet republics.
- November 19–21 – The leaders of Canada, the United States, and 32 European states meet in Paris to formally mark the end of the Cold War.
- November 20 – Andrei Chikatilo, one of the Soviet Union's most prolific serial killers, is arrested in Novocherkassk.
- November 21
  - The Charter of Paris for a New Europe is signed.
  - Nintendo releases the Super Famicom in Japan alongside its launch games Super Mario World and F-Zero.
- November 22 – British PM Margaret Thatcher announces she will not contest the second ballot of the leadership election for the Conservative Party.
- November 25 – Lech Wałęsa and Stanisław Tymiński win the first round of the first Polish presidential election.
- November 27 – Women's suffrage is introduced in the last Swiss half-canton of Appenzell Innerrhoden.
- November 28
  - Prime Minister of Singapore Lee Kuan Yew resigns and is replaced by Goh Chok Tong.
  - The first female Prime Minister of the United Kingdom, Margaret Thatcher, resigns after 11 years and is replaced by John Major.
- November 29
  - Gulf War: The United Nations Security Council passes UN Security Council Resolution 678, authorizing military intervention in Iraq if that state does not withdraw its forces from Kuwait and free all foreign hostages by Tuesday, January 15, 1991.
  - Prime Minister of Bulgaria Andrey Lukanov and his government of former communists resign under pressure from strikes and street protests.

=== December ===
- December 1
  - Channel Tunnel workers from the United Kingdom and France meet 40 metres beneath the English Channel seabed, establishing the first land connection between Great Britain and the mainland of Europe for around 8,000 years.
  - President of Chad Hissène Habré is deposed by the Patriotic Salvation Movement and replaced as president by its leader Idriss Déby.
- December 2 – The German federal election (the first election held since German reunification) is won by Helmut Kohl, who remains Chancellor of Germany.
  - People's Republic of Benin is dissolved after a constitutional referendum.
- December 3
  - 1990 Wayne County Airport runway collision: At Detroit Metropolitan Airport, Northwest Airlines Flight 1482 (a McDonnell Douglas DC-9) collides with Northwest Airlines Flight 299 (a Boeing 727) on the runway, killing 8 passengers and 4 crew members.
  - Mary Robinson begins her term as President of Ireland, becoming the first female to hold this office.
- December 6 – President Hussain Muhammad Ershad of Bangladesh is forced to resign following massive protests; he is replaced by Shahabuddin Ahmed, who becomes interim president.
- December 7 – The National Assembly of Bulgaria elects Dimitar Iliev Popov as Prime Minister of Bulgaria.
- December 9
  - Slobodan Milošević elected President of Serbia in first round, general elections won by his Socialist Party.
  - Lech Wałęsa wins the 2nd round of Poland's first presidential election.
- December 11
  - Fall of communism in Albania: Ramiz Alia, leader of the People's Socialist Republic of Albania, following massive demonstrations by students and workers, announces that a free national election will be held next spring of 1991 with political parties other than the Party of Labour permitted; an opposition Democratic Party is formed the following day.
  - A multi-vehicle traffic collision known as the 1990 Interstate 75 fog disaster occurs; 12 deaths and 42 were caused by this event
- December 13 – Murder charges against Dr. Jack Kevorkian are dismissed in Michigan, related to the April assisted-suicide death of an Alzheimer's patient, Janet Adkins. A state judge determined that Kevorkian only provided the means for Ms. Adkins to die. This is the first of numerous cases to be brought against Kevorkian over the next decade.
- December 16 – Jean-Bertrand Aristide is elected president of Haiti, ending 3 decades of military rule.
- December 18 – President Kenneth Kaunda agrees to allow multiparty elections in Zambia after 17 years of single-party rule.
- December 20
  - Eduard Shevardnadze announces his resignation as Soviet Minister of Foreign Affairs
  - Tim Berners-Lee completes the test for the first webpage at CERN.
- December 22
  - The first constitution of Croatia is adopted.
  - The Marshall Islands and Federated States of Micronesia become independent, following the termination of their trusteeship.
  - In Warsaw Lech Wałęsa takes the oath of office as President of Poland, succeeding Wojciech Jaruzelski. Ryszard Kaczorowski, head of the Polish government-in-exile, hands over the insignia of presidential power to Wałęsa as a sign of the dissolution of the exiled government that had had its seat in London since 1939.
- December 23 – In the Slovenian independence referendum, 88.5% of the overall electorate (94.8% of votes), with the turnout of 93.3%, support independence of the country.
- December 24 – Ramsewak Shankar is ousted as President of Suriname by a military coup.
- December 25 – Russian aircraft carrier Admiral Kuznetsov is commissioned.
- December 30 – Russian Garry Kasparov holds his title by winning the World Chess Championship match against his countryman Anatoly Karpov.

=== World population ===
World population
	1990	1985			1995		
World	5,263,593,000	4,830,979,000	432,614,000	+8.95%	5,674,380,000	410,787,000	+7.80%
Africa	622,443,000	541,718,000	80,629,000	+14.88%	707,462,000	85,019,000	+13.66%
Asia	3,167,807,000	2,887,552,000	280,255,000	+9.71%	3,430,052,000	262,245,000	+8.28%
Europe	721,582,000	706,009,000	15,573,000	+2.21%	727,405,000	5,823,000	+0.81%
Latin America	441,525,000	401,469,000	40,056,000	+9.98%	481,099,000	39,574,000	+8.96%
North America	283,549,000	269,456,000	14,093,000	+5.23%	299,438,000	15,889,000	+5.60%
Oceania	26,687,000	24,678,000	2,009,000	+8.14%	28,924,000	2,237,000	+8.38%

== Nobel Prizes ==

- Physics – Jerome Isaac Friedman, Henry Way Kendall, and Richard Edward Taylor
- Chemistry – Elias James Corey
- Physiology or Medicine – Joseph Murray, E. Donnall Thomas
- Literature – Octavio Paz
- Peace – Mikhail Gorbachev
- Bank of Sweden Prize in Economic Sciences in Memory of Alfred Nobel – Harry Markowitz, Merton Miller, William F. Sharpe

== Fields Medal ==
- Vladimir Drinfeld, Vaughan Jones, Shigefumi Mori, Edward Witten
