= List of earthquakes in 1990 =

Earthquakes in 1990
Approximate epicenters of the earthquakes in 1990
- 4.0–5.9 magnitude
- 6.0–6.9 magnitude
- 7.0–7.9 magnitude
- 8.0+ magnitude
- Strongest magnitude: 7.8 M_{w} Indonesia
- Deadliest: 7.4 M_{w} Iran; 50,000 deaths
- Total fatalities: 51,821

Number by magnitude
- 9.0+: 0
- 8.0–8.9: 0
- 7.0–7.9: 17
- 6.0–6.9: 130

This is a list of earthquakes in 1990. Only earthquakes of magnitude 6 or above are included, unless they result in damage and/or casualties, or are notable for some other reason. All dates are listed according to UTC time.

== By death toll ==
Rank	Death toll	Magnitude	Location	MMI	Depth (km)	Date
1	50,000	7.4	Iran, Gilan	X (Extreme)	18.5	June 21
2	1,621	7.7	Philippines, Luzon	IX (Violent)	25.1	July 16
3	126	6.5	China, Qinghai	IX (Violent)	8.1	April 26
4	21	6.6	Iran	IX (Violent)	10.6	November 6
5	19	5.6	Italy, Sicily	VII (Very strong)	11.1	December 13
6	14	7.0	Romania, Vrancea	VIII (Severe)	89.3	May 30

== By magnitude ==
Rank	Magnitude	Death toll	Location	MMI	Depth (km)	Date
1	7.8	5	Indonesia	VII (Very strong)	25.7	April 18
1	7.7	1,621	Philippines	IX (Violent)	25.1	July 16
3	7.6	0	Fiji	unreported	33.2	March 3
3	7.6	0	Northern Mariana Islands	V (Moderate)	11.4	April 5
5	7.4	50,000	Iran	X (Extreme)	18.5	June 21
6	7.3	0	Costa Rica	VIII (Severe)	22.2	March 25
7	7.2	0	Russia	III (Weak)	605.7	May 12
7	7.2	0	South Sudan	VIII (Severe)	14.9	May 20
7	7.2	0	Vanuatu	VII (Very strong)	125.7	July 27
10	7.1	0	Vanuatu	VI (Strong)	20.7	March 5
10	7.1	0	South Sudan	VIII (Severe)	16.0	May 24
10	7.1	0	Indonesia	III (Weak)	588.9	May 24
10	7.1	8	Philippines	VIII (Severe)	18.1	June 14
10	7.1	0	Vanuatu	VII (Very strong)	140.4	August 12
10	7.1	0	United States, Alaska	unreported	24.8	November 6
16	7.0	14	Romania	VIII (Severe)	89.3	May 30
16	7.0	0	Peru	III (Weak)	598.8	October 17

Listed are earthquakes with at least 7.0 magnitude.

== By month ==
=== January ===
January
- Strongest magnitude: 6.5 M_{w} Tonga
- Total fatalities: 0

Number by magnitude
- 8.0–8.9: 0
- 7.0–7.9: 0
- 6.0–6.9: 10
- 5.0–5.9: ?
- 4.0–4.9: ?

Date	Country and location	M_{w}	Depth (km)	MMI	Notes	Casualties	
Date	Country and location	M_{w}	Depth (km)	MMI	Notes	Dead	Injured
4	Tonga, Niuatoputapu, 118 km east northeast of Hihifo	6.5	53.5	-	-	-	-
5	Mexico, Jalisco, 189 km southwest of La Cruz de Loreto	6.0	33.0	-	-	-	-
6	South Indian Ocean	6.0	14.8	-	-	-	-
8	United States, Alaska, 107 km south southwest of Nikolski	6.0	33.0	-	-	-	-
9	Myanmar, 120 km east of Wangjing, India	6.3	119.2	V	-	-	-
14	China, northern Qinghai	6.0	12.2	VII	-	-	-
14	New Zealand, Kermadec Islands	6.1	58.3	-	-	-	-
18	New Zealand, Kermadec Islands	6.0	13.4	-	-	-	-
20	Iran, Tehran, 36 km east of Soleh Bon	6.0	24.5	VII	Slight damage occurred in Firuzkuh.	-	-
22	Indonesia, Aceh, 28 km south of Meulaboh	6.2	45.7	V	-	-	-

=== February ===
February
- Strongest magnitude: 6.9 M_{w} Vanuatu
- Deadliest: 6.8 M_{w} Philippines; 6 deaths
- Total fatalities: 6

Number by magnitude
- 8.0–8.9: 0
- 7.0–7.9: 0
- 6.0–6.9: 11
- 5.0–5.9: ?
- 4.0–4.9: ?

Date	Country and location	M_{w}	Depth (km)	MMI	Notes	Casualties	
Date	Country and location	M_{w}	Depth (km)	MMI	Notes	Dead	Injured
2	Fiji, Viti Levu, 84 km southwest of Nadi	6.0	10.0	V	-	-	-
5	Afghanistan, Badakhshan Province, 42 km east northeast of Jurm	6.3	109.9	VI	Slight damage occurred in Khorog, in neighboring Tajikistan.	-	-
8	Philippines, Central Visayas, 13 km south southwest of Bacong	6.8	25.9	VII	After the 1990 Bohol Sea earthquake, six fatalities were reported and more than 200 people were injured. About 46,000 people were displaced by the event. This event damaged at least ₱154 million to properties. Anomalously large tsunami waves reportedly impacted Camiguin Island.	6	200
8	Philippines, Central Visayas, 6 km south southwest of Bacong	6.6	30.3	VI	Aftershock of the 6.8 magnitude earthquake that struck the same area minutes ago.	-	-
10	New Zealand, 90 km north of Amberley	6.0	9.8	VII	Slight damage occurred in the Canterbury Region.	-	-
17	Japan, Miyazaki, 80 km south southeast Koshima	6.1	65.9	III	-	-	-
19	New Zealand, 41 km east of Palmerston North	6.3	24.3	VII	Over $440,000 worth of damage occurred in Palmerston North.	-	-
19	Vanuatu, Espiritu Santo, 83 km west of Luganville	6.9	12.1	VIII	-	-	-
20	Japan, Shizuoka, 28 km east of Shimoda	6.4	14.2	VII	-	-	-
24	Tonga, Niuatoputapu, 161 km west northwest of Hihifo	6.2	33.0	-	-	-	-
26	Easter Island region	6.1	14.2	-	-	-	-
28	United States, California, 6 km north northeast of Claremont	5.5	3.3	VII	The 1990 Upland earthquake left some buildings damaged and 30 people injured.	-	30

=== March ===
March
- Strongest magnitude: 7.6 M_{w} Fiji
- Deadliest: 6.1 M_{w} Pakistan; 11 deaths
- Total fatalities: 12

Number by magnitude
- 8.0–8.9: 0
- 7.0–7.9: 3
- 6.0–6.9: 11
- 5.0–5.9: ?
- 4.0–4.9: ?

Date	Country and location	M_{w}	Depth (km)	MMI	Notes	Casualties	
Date	Country and location	M_{w}	Depth (km)	MMI	Notes	Dead	Injured
3	Fiji, south of Fiji Islands	7.6	33.2	IV	-	-	-
3	Fiji, south of Fiji Islands	6.2	33.0	I	-	-	-
3	New Caledonia, southeast of Loyalty Islands	6.6	33.0	I	-	-	-
4	Pakistan, Balochistan, 27 km west southwest of Kalat	6.1	10.1	VIII	In Kalat, eleven deaths and 40 injuries were reported. Many homes were damaged.	11	40
5	Vanuatu, Shefa, 69 km north of Port-Vila	7.1	20.7	VI	-	-	-
5	Afghanistan, 62 km east of Khandad	6.2	12.2	VII	-	-	-
12	United States, Alaska, 97 km southwest of Atka	6.4	13.8	IV	-	-	-
15	Vanuatu, Espiritu Santo, 20 km east southeast of Port Olry	6.5	132.3	V	-	-	-
16	Mexico, Sinaloa, 72 km south southwest of El Huitusi	6.1	10.0	V	-	-	-
21	New Zealand, Kermadec Islands	6.6	144.8	I	-	-	-
25	Costa Rica, Puntarenas, 11 km east of Paquera	6.4	26.6	VIII	Foreshock of the 7.3 magnitude earthquake that struck the same area minutes later.	-	-
25	Costa Rica, Puntarenas, 7 km south southeast of Puntarenas	7.3	22.2	VIII	The earthquake was also felt in other countries like Nicaragua and Panama. Ten people were injured by the earthquake. About 60 buildings were severely damaged. Several landslides blocked the roads in San José area.	-	10
25	Afghanistan, 56 km east of Khandad	6.3	33.0	VI	Slight damage occurred in villages near the Pamir Mountains.	-	-
26	Philippines, Surigao del Norte, 5 km northeast of Jagupit	5.9	39.2	VI	One person died and 2 were injured in Santiago.	1	2
31	Russia, 102 km south of Shikotan	6.0	21.0	I	-	-	-

=== April ===
April
- Strongest magnitude: 7.8 M_{w} Indonesia
- Deadliest: 6.5 M_{w} China; 126 deaths
- Total fatalities: 131

Number by magnitude
- 8.0–8.9: 0
- 7.0–7.9: 2
- 6.0–6.9: 19
- 5.0–5.9: ?
- 4.0–4.9: ?

Date	Country and location	M_{w}	Depth (km)	MMI	Notes	Casualties	
Date	Country and location	M_{w}	Depth (km)	MMI	Notes	Dead	Injured
2	United Kingdom, Wales	4.7	10.0	V	The 1990 Bishop's Castle earthquake left damage to several buildings.	-	-
3	Papua New Guinea, eastern New Guinea region	6.2	88.2	V	-	-	-
3	Nicaragua, Carazo, 36 km south southwest of La Conquista	6.8	52.5	VII	-	-	-
5	Northern Mariana Islands, 198 km east of Saipan	7.6	11.4	V	-	-	-
6	South Georgia and South Sandwich Islands, South Sandwich Islands region	6.0	33.0	I	-	-	-
6	Northern Mariana Islands, 197 km east of Saipan	6.3	15.5	I	-	-	-
9	Fiji, south of the Fiji Islands	6.0	17.4	I	-	-	-
11	Japan, Kyoto, 11 km east northeast of Maizuru	6.1	362.3	III	-	-	-
17	China, Xinjiang, 93 km west of Kashgar	6.0	13.0	VI	Two people were injured and many houses collapsed in Wuqia County.	-	2
17	central Mid-Atlantic Ridge	6.1	10.0	I	-	-	-
18	Indonesia, Sulawesi, 75 km north northwest of Gorontalo	7.8	25.7	VII	The earthquake damaged several houses and buildings. Five people died, while 36 others injured.	5	36
18	Indonesia, Sulawesi, 86 km north of Gorontalo	6.5	19.1	V	Aftershock of the 7.8 magnitude earthquake that struck the same area few hours ago.	-	-
19	Indonesia, Sulawesi, Minahasa	6.0	33.0	IV	Aftershock of the 7.8 magnitude earthquake that struck Indonesia on April 18.	-	-
19	Indonesia, Sulawesi, 75 km north northeast of Gorontalo	6.5	23.7	VI	Aftershock of the 7.8 magnitude earthquake that struck the same area on April 18.	-	-
21	Chile, 15 km west northwest of Coronel	6.3	11.9	VII	-	-	-
26	China, Qinghai, 148 km west southwest of Xining	6.3	10.0	VIII	Foreshock of the 1990 Gonghe earthquake	-	-
26	China, Qinghai, 143 km west southwest of Xining	6.2	10.0	VIII	Foreshock of the 1990 Gonghe earthquake	-	-
26	China, Qinghai, 153 km west southwest of Xining	6.5	8.1	IX	The 1990 Gonghe earthquake leaves 126 dead and 2,049 injured. Several homes and buildings collapsed and were damaged.	126	2,049
26	China, Qinghai, 141 km west southwest of Xining	6.3	9.6	VIII	Aftershock of the 1990 Gonghe earthquake	-	-
26	Indonesia, Sulawesi, 63 km north northwest of Gorontalo	6.0	24.4	V	Aftershock of the 7.8 magnitude earthquake that struck the same area on April 18.	-	-
28	Costa Rica, Puntarenas 8 km south southeast of Ciudad Cortés	6.4	22.7	VII	-	-	-
30	Norway, Bouvet Island region	6.0	10.0	I	-	-	-

=== May ===
May
- Strongest magnitude: 7.2 M_{w} Russia; 7.2 M_{w} (Sudan) South Sudan
- Deadliest: 7.0 M_{w} Romania; 14 deaths
- Total fatalities: 14

Number by magnitude
- 8.0–8.9: 0
- 7.0–7.9: 5
- 6.0–6.9: 17
- 5.0–5.9: ?
- 4.0–4.9: ?

Date	Country and location	M_{w}	Depth (km)	MMI	Notes	Casualties	
Date	Country and location	M_{w}	Depth (km)	MMI	Notes	Dead	Injured
1	United States, Alaska, 19 km south southeast King Salmon	6.6	252.0	IV	-	-	-
2	Papua New Guinea, West New Britain, 6 km south southeast Kimbe	6.4	81.6	VI	-	-	-
8	Panama, Chiriquí, 127 km south southeast Punta de Burica	6.5	9.6	-	-	-	-
9	South Georgia and South Sandwich Islands, South Sandwich Islands region	6.0	33.0	-	-	-	-
11	North Korea, 67 km southeast of Rajin	6.3	578.5	-	-	-	-
12	Russia, 16 km west southwest of Uglegorsk	7.2	605.7	III	-	-	-
13	New Zealand, 39 km east southeast of Palmerston North	6.4	20.6	VII	-	-	-
14	Chile, Maule, 18 km east of Linares	6.2	75.9	V	-	-	-
15	Afghanistan, 77 km southeast of Farkh?r	6.0	113.1	IV	-	-	-
15	Indonesia, Sulawesi, 105 km west of Tomohon	6.0	29.7	V	-	-	-
20	Sudan, Central Equatoria, 69 km east northeast of Juba	7.2	14.9	VIII	-	-	-
20	Tonga, Vava'u, 135 km west northwest of Neiafu	6.3	232.2	-	-	-	-
20	New Zealand, south of the Kermadec Islands	6.1	345.6	-	-	-	-
22	Chile, West Chile Rise	6.1	33.0	-	-	-	-
24	South Sudan, Central Equatoria, 54 km north northeast of Juba	6.5	16.5	VIII	-	-	-
24	South Sudan, Central Equatoria, 63 km north northeast of Juba	7.1	16.0	VIII	The earthquake was reported to have done substantial damage to private housing and government institutions at Terakeka which is 60 km north of Juba. The damage made by the earthquake was minimal. No loss of lives reported. In Juba, minor cracking of the walls of some older buildings reported.	-	-
24	Indonesia, West Manggarai, 135 km north northeast of Labuan Bajo	7.1	588.9	III	-	-	-
29	United States, Alaska, 155 km south southeast of Akhiok	6.1	10.0	-	-	-	-
30	Peru, 6 km east southeast of Segunda Jerusalén – Azunguillo	6.6	24.2	VII	-	-	-
30	Romania, 5 km west of Nistore?ti	7.0	89.3	VIII	The 1990 Vrancea earthquakes killed 14 people and injured 362 others. Landslides were reported. Total damage of loss in Romania was $16 million, while $2 million total damage were reported in Moldova and Bulgaria. $24 million insured losses in Romania. The earthquake killed nine people in Romania. Four people died and several others injured in Moldova, while in northern Bulgaria, one person died from heart attack. The earthquake also injured some people in Ukraine.	14	362
31	Romania, 2 km south southwest of Nistore?ti	6.3	88.2	V	The 1990 Vrancea earthquakes killed 14 people and injured 362 others. Landslides were reported. Total damage of loss in Romania was $16 million, while $2 million total damage were reported in Moldova and Bulgaria. $24 million insured losses in Romania. The earthquake killed nine people in Romania. Four people died and several others injured in Moldova, while in northern Bulgaria, one person died from heart attack. The earthquake also injured some people in Ukraine.	14	362
31	Mexico, Guerrero 7 km northeast of Nuxco	6.0	22.6	VI	-	-	-

=== June ===
June
- Strongest magnitude: 7.4 M_{w} Iran
- Deadliest: 7.4 M_{w} Iran; 50,000 deaths
- Total fatalities: 50,008

Number by magnitude
- 8.0–8.9: 0
- 7.0–7.9: 2
- 6.0–6.9: 10
- 5.0–5.9: ?
- 4.0–4.9: ?

Date	Country and location	M_{w}	Depth (km)	MMI	Notes	Casualties	
Date	Country and location	M_{w}	Depth (km)	MMI	Notes	Dead	Injured
1	Japan, near the east coast Honshu	6.3	67.0	VI	-	-	-
7	Papua New Guinea, 68 km northeast of Angoram	6.5	29.3	VI	-	-	-
8	Fiji, Ovalau, 219 km east southeast of Levuka	6.5	499.2	-	-	-	-
14	Philippines, Western Visayas, 0 km east southeast of Union	7.1	18.1	VIII	The 1990 Panay earthquake left heavy damage to several buildings in Panay Island. It also left several structures collapsed. Upliftments were recorded in some barangays. Landslides were recorded along the slope of Mt. Madya-as. The earthquake killed eight people and injured 41.	8	41
14	Kazakh Soviet Socialist Republic, 47 km north northeast of Zaysan	6.6	57.9	VI	-	-	-
15	Papua New Guinea, East New Britain, 79 km south southwest of Kokopo	6.0	60.1	V	-	-	-
16	Japan, Okinawa, 153 km north of Nago	6.0	27.0	-	-	-	-
17	Pakistan, Balochistan, 99 km west southwest of Khuzdar	6.1	14.5	VII	-	-	-
21	Iran, 23 km north of Manjil	7.4	18.5	IX	The 1990 Manjil-Rudbar earthquake killed up to 50,000 people, injured 105,000 people and displaced 400,000 people in Iran. The earthquake caused widespread damage in Iran.	50,000	105,000
23	Papua New Guinea, Manus, 180 km north northwest of Lorengau	6.2	23.9	-	-	-	-
23	Tonga, Tongatapu, 139 km west southwest of Haveluloto	6.9	180.5	-	-	-	-
23	Fiji, south of the Fiji Islands	6.3	586.8	-	-	-	-

=== July ===
July
- Strongest magnitude: 7.7 M_{w} Philippines
- Deadliest: 7.7 M_{w} Philippines; 1,621 deaths
- Total fatalities: 1,621

Number by magnitude
- 8.0–8.9: 0
- 7.0–7.9: 2
- 6.0–6.9: 10
- 5.0–5.9: ?
- 4.0–4.9: ?

Date	Country and location	M_{w}	Depth (km)	MMI	Notes	Casualties	
Date	Country and location	M_{w}	Depth (km)	MMI	Notes	Dead	Injured
9	South Sudan, Central Equatoria, 60 km north of Juba	6.6	12.6	VIII	-	-	-
10	Solomon Islands, Makira, 88 km west of Kirakira	6.4	66.3	VI	-	-	-
11	Fiji, south of the Fiji Islands	6.0	584.8	-	-	-	-
11	Fiji, south of the Fiji Islands	6.0	589.8	-	-	-	-
13	Afghanistan, Badakhshan Province, 50 km east northeast of Jurm	6.4	216.8	IV	The earthquake triggered an avalanche on Lenin Peak, killing 43 mountaineers.	43	-
14	Ascension Island, north of Ascension Island	6.6	11.1	-	-	-	-
16	Philippines, Luzon, 4 km east of Macapsing	7.7	25.1	IX	The 1990 Luzon earthquake caused widespread damage in the Philippines. The earthquake produced a 125 km-long ground rupture that stretched from Dingalan, Aurora to Kayapa, Nueva Vizcaya. The event was a result of strike-slip movements along the Philippine Fault and the Digdig Fault within the Philippine fault system. At least 1,621 people were killed in the earthquake.	1,621	3,513
17	Philippines, Luzon, 10 km east southeast of Ambuclao	6.1	18.3	VII	Aftershock of the 1990 Luzon earthquake	-	-
17	Philippines, Luzon, 14 km north northwest of Salinas	6.5	23.1	VI	Aftershock of the 1990 Luzon earthquake	-	-
22	Fiji, south of the Fiji Islands	6.3	531.3	-	-	-	-
27	Vanuatu, Espiritu Santo, 37 km east northeast of Luganville	7.2	125.7	VII	-	-	-

=== August ===
August
- Strongest magnitude: 7.1 M_{w} Vanuatu
- Total fatalities: 0

Number by magnitude
- 8.0–8.9: 0
- 7.0–7.9: 1
- 6.0–6.9: 13
- 5.0–5.9: ?
- 4.0–4.9: ?

Date	Country and location	M_{w}	Depth (km)	MMI	Notes	Casualties	
Date	Country and location	M_{w}	Depth (km)	MMI	Notes	Dead	Injured
2	Chile, Coquimbo, 49 km west of Illapel	6.0	35.8	VI	-	-	-
3	Kazakh Soviet Socialist Republic, 55 km west of Zaysan	6.2	33.4	VI	-	-	-
5	Japan, Izu Islands	6.5	469.2	-	-	-	-
5	Japan, 43 km east of ?arai	6.1	26.6	V	-	-	-
5	Ascension Island, north of Ascension Island	6.4	10.0	-	-	-	-
10	Indonesia, North Maluku 143 km west southwest of Ternate	6.2	53.2	-	-	-	-
12	Vanuatu, Tanna, 19 km northwest of Isangel	7.1	140.4	VII	-	-	-
14	northern Mid-Atlantic Ridge	6.3	10.0	-	-	-	-
16	China, Xinjiang, 157 km south southwest of Turpan	6.2	0.0	-	This earthquake was a Nuclear Explosion	-	-
17	Solomon Islands, Makira, 78 km south of Kirakira	6.7	29.1	VI	-	-	-
18	Mid Indian-Ridge	6.2	10.0	-	-	-	-
18	Indonesia, Sumatra, 232 km northwest of Sabang	6.0	29.1	-	-	-	-
21	Easter Island region	6.0	10.5	-	-	-	-
25	Indonesia, North Maluku 147 km west southwest of Ternate	6.4	11.3	-	-	-	-

=== September ===
September
- Strongest magnitude: 6.7 M_{w} Vanuatu
- Total fatalities: 0

Number by magnitude
- 8.0–8.9: 0
- 7.0–7.9: 0
- 6.0–6.9: 13
- 5.0–5.9: ?
- 4.0–4.9: ?

Date	Country and location	M_{w}	Depth (km)	MMI	Notes	Casualties	
Date	Country and location	M_{w}	Depth (km)	MMI	Notes	Dead	Injured
2	Ecuador, Pedernales, 34 km southwest of Pedernales	6.6	14.2	VII	-	-	-
2	Papua New Guinea, Manus, 166 km southeast of Lorengau	6.0	22.8	-	-	-	-
8	Tonga, Lifuka, 83 km south southeast of Pangai	6.0	33.0	-	-	-	-
9	Papua New Guinea, East New Britain, 110 km south southwest of Kokopo	6.0	73.8	V	-	-	-
14	South Georgia and South Sandwich Islands, South Sandwich Islands region	6.0	33.0	-	-	-	-
17	Macquarie Island region	6.4	10.0	-	-	-	-
23	Tonga, Niuatoputapu, 108 km north of Hihifo	6.0	33.0	-	-	-	-
23	Vanuatu, Shefa, 74 km west of Port-Vila	6.4	10.0	V	-	-	-
23	Indonesia, Maluku, 289 km west southwest of Tual	6.5	33.0	-	-	-	-
23	Japan, 153 km south southeast of ?yama	6.5	10.0	IV	-	-	-
23	Japan, 162 km south southeast of ?yama	6.2	10.0	-	-	-	-
28	Vanuatu, Vanua Lava, 62 km northwest of Sola	6.7	176.0	V	-	-	-
30	Japan, Okinawa, 62 km south of Hirara	6.1	35.0	-	-	-	-

=== October ===
October
- Strongest magnitude: 7.0 M_{w} Peru
- Total fatalities: 0

Number by magnitude
- 8.0–8.9: 0
- 7.0–7.9: 1
- 6.0–6.9: 5
- 5.0–5.9: ?
- 4.0–4.9: ?

Date	Country and location	M_{w}	Depth (km)	MMI	Notes	Casualties	
Date	Country and location	M_{w}	Depth (km)	MMI	Notes	Dead	Injured
10	Bolivia, Oruro, 68 km south southeast of Challapata	6.6	266.0	-	-	-	-
10	Fiji, south of the Fiji Islands	6.1	548.5	-	-	-	-
15	Indonesia, southwest of Sumatra	6.8	32.2	-	-	-	-
17	Peru, Madre de Dios 130 km west of Iñapari	7.0	598.8	III	-	-	-
25	Philippines, Caraga 13 km east of Tidman	6.5	44.1	VI	-	-	-
26	southern Mid-Atlantic Ridge	6.1	10.0	-	-	-	-

=== November ===
November
- Strongest magnitude: 7.1 M_{w} United States
- Deadliest: 6.6 M_{w} Iran; 21 deaths
- Total fatalities: 21

Number by magnitude
- 8.0–8.9: 0
- 7.0–7.9: 1
- 6.0–6.9: 7
- 5.0–5.9: ?
- 4.0–4.9: ?

Date	Country and location	M_{w}	Depth (km)	MMI	Notes	Casualties	
Date	Country and location	M_{w}	Depth (km)	MMI	Notes	Dead	Injured
6	Iran, 105 km east southeast of D?r?b	6.6	10.6	IX	The earthquake killed at least 21 people and over 90 injured. Houses were destroyed. Buildings received major damage.	21	90
6	United States, Alaska 231 km west northwest of Attu Station	7.1	24.8	-	-	-	-
12	Kirghiz Soviet Socialist Republic, Issyk-Kul Region 35 km northwest of Tyup	6.4	19.1	VII	-	-	-
15	Indonesia, Aceh 84 km southwest of Langsa	6.7	48.4	VII	-	-	-
21	United States, Alaska 206 km east southeast of Atka	6.0	33.0	-	-	-	-
22	Papua New Guinea, West New Britain 94 km east of Kimbe	6.3	28.7	VI	-	-	-
23	Colombia, Quindío 7 km north of Salento	6.1	144.6	IV	-	-	-
29	New Zealand, Kermadec Islands region	6.1	415.0	-	-	-	-

=== December ===
December
- Strongest magnitude: 6.4 M_{w} Tonga
- Deadliest: 5.6 M_{w} Italy; 19 deaths
- Total fatalities: 20

Number by magnitude
- 8.0–8.9: 0
- 7.0–7.9: 0
- 6.0–6.9: 4
- 5.0–5.9: ?
- 4.0–4.9: ?

Date	Country and location	M_{w}	Depth (km)	MMI	Notes	Casualties	
Date	Country and location	M_{w}	Depth (km)	MMI	Notes	Dead	Injured
5	Indonesia, Maluku, 158 km west northwest of Tual	6.1	75.1	-	-	-	-
10	Papua New Guinea, Hela, 74 km west of Tari	6.0	32.4	VI	-	-	-
11	Tonga, Niuatoputapu, 90 km northeast of Hihifo	6.4	12.8	-	-	-	-
13	Italy, Sicily, 20 km east northeast of Augusta	5.6	11.1	VII	The 1990 Carlentini earthquake killed 19 people and injured 200 people. Carlentini was the worst hit, where members of five families were killed when their homes collapsed. Several buildings, structures and houses collapsed and were destroyed.	19	200
22	Costa Rica, 2 km north northeast of Santiago	6.0	17.3	VI	The earthquake killed one person, injured 299 people and left 14,000 people homeless. Cost of damage estimated $19.5 million. The earthquake left some structures serious damage.	1	299

== See also ==
- Lists of 20th-century earthquakes
- Lists of earthquakes by year
