= 1990 Upland earthquake =

Earthquake in Southern California

- UTC time: 1990-02-28 23:43:36
- ISC event: 380064
- USGS-ANSS: ComCat
- Local date: February 28, 1990
- Local time: 23:43:37 UTC
- Magnitude: 5.7 M_{w}
- Depth: 10 km (6.2 mi)
- Epicenter: 34.16°N 117.73°W
- Fault: San Jose Fault
- Type: Strike-slip
- Areas affected: Greater Los Angeles Area; Southern California; United States
- Total damage: $12.7 million
- Max. intensity: MMI VII (Very strong)
- Peak acceleration: 1.05 g
- Casualties: 30 injured

The 1990 Upland earthquake occurred at 15:43:37 local time on February 28 with a moment magnitude of 5.7 and a maximum Mercalli Intensity of VII (Very strong). This left-lateral strike-slip earthquake occurred west of the San Andreas Fault System and injured thirty people, with total losses of $12.7 million. Many strong motion instruments captured the event, with an unexpectedly high value seen on water tank near the epicentral area.

== Tectonic setting ==
In the Transverse Ranges west of the right-lateral San Andreas Fault System, some faults exhibit left-lateral slip, including some at the boundary of the Los Angeles Basin and the Transverse Ranges.

== Earthquake ==
While several examinations of earthquake focal mechanisms in the Upland area showed both thrust and strike-slip faulting on opposite ends of the San Jose Fault, the mechanism of the 1990 event showed pure left-lateral motion on a steeply-dipping (70°) and northeast-striking fault. Field investigations revealed that the bilateral rupture did not reach the surface.

=== Strong motion ===
The shock was felt from Santa Barbara in the west and to Las Vegas in the east. It was also felt in Ensenada, Baja California and it triggered 82 strong motion instruments at distances of 3–76 kilometers (1.9–47.2 mi). Typical ground accelerations were around 0.1 g at distances of up to 30 km (19 mi), but some closer stations had significantly higher responses.

=== Damage ===
Rockslides left some roads closed in the San Gabriel Mountains and Pomona city hall was heavily damaged. In Claremont some buildings were damaged, but only one building in Upland's historic downtown area was tagged for non-occupation. Those that were injured suffered cuts and bruises (mainly from falling objects) but two men were injured as a result of a landslide.

== See also ==
- List of earthquakes in 1990
- List of earthquakes in California
- List of earthquakes in the United States
