= 1990 Carlentini earthquake =

Earthquake off the coast of Sicily, Italy

- Location within Italy
- UTC time: 1990-12-13 00:24:25
- ISC event: 347186
- USGS-ANSS: ComCat
- Local date: 13 December 1990
- Local time: 01:24 EET
- Duration: 45 seconds
- Magnitude: 5.6 M_{w}
- Depth: 11.1 km (6.9 mi)
- Epicenter: 37.300°N 15.438°E
- Type: Strike-slip
- Areas affected: Sicily, Italy
- Max. intensity: MMI VIII (Severe)
- Tsunami: None
- Aftershocks: mb 4.6 on 16 December
- Casualties: 19 dead, 200 injured

The 1990 Carlentini earthquake (Italian: Terremoto di Carlentini del 1990) occurred off the Sicilian coast, 20 km east northeast from the town of Augusta, Sicily on 13 December at 01:24 local time. The moderately-sized earthquake measuring 5.6 on the moment magnitude scale (M_{w}) resulted in the deaths of 19 people and caused at least 200 injuries. It also inflicted significant damage in the region, leaving 2,500 homeless.

Lasting 45 seconds, the shock was assigned a maximum Modified Mercalli intensity of VII–VIII (Very strong–Severe). The earthquake was followed-up by four aftershocks that were felt by people.

== Tectonic setting ==
The island of Sicily is situated near the edge of a convergent plate boundary where the African plate is colliding with Eurasia. The denser African plate subducts or dives beneath the Eurasian plate. Subduction occurs offshore in the Mediterranean Sea along the Calabrian subduction zone. The presence of active subduction makes Sicily a seismically active island due to the resulting crustal deformation associated with the interaction of the Eurasian and African plates.

== Earthquake ==
The largest shock measured 5.6 on the moment magnitude scale (M_{w}) and 5.4 on the Richter scale (M_{L}). Focal mechanism of the mainshock suggested it occurred as a result of strike-slip faulting on either a sinistral, north–south striking, vertically dipping fault, or a dextral, east–west fault plane.

Four foreshocks that were recorded beginning in early December to the day before the mainshock. Two foreshocks occurred on 3 December. On 11 and 12 December two foreshocks with magnitudes of 2.1 and 2.4 occurred. Few aftershocks were recorded within the first half-hour after the mainshock; the largest was a magnitude 2.7 event. The largest aftershock measured M_{L} 4.6 on 16 December. The focal mechanism of the largest aftershock implied normal faulting. Following the largest aftershock, there was a dramatic increase in seismic activity, which continued for 19 days. The aftershock sequence ceased in early 1991.

=== Impact ===
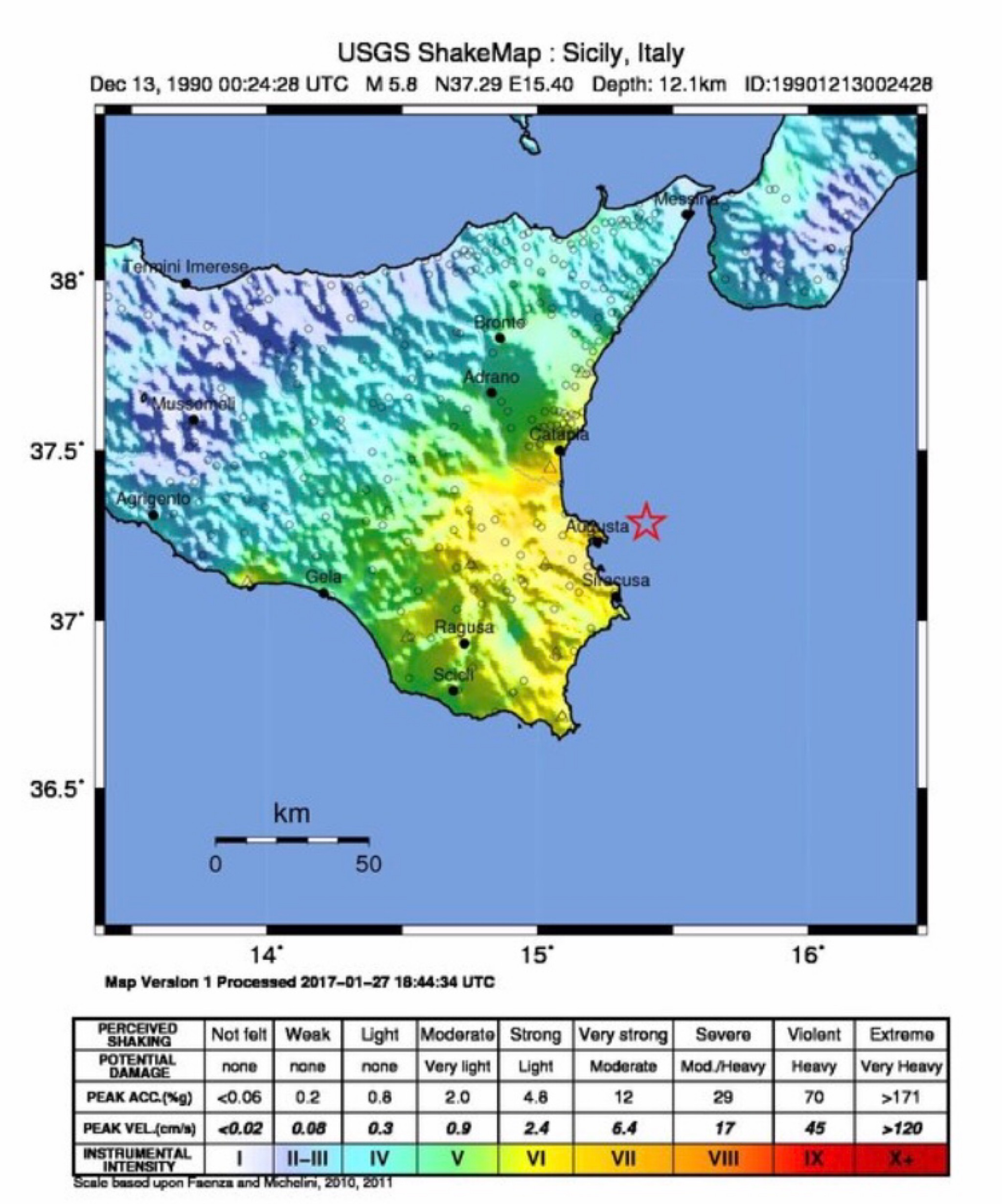
A USGS ShakeMap of the earthquake showing various intensities of shaking.

In the town of Carlentini, two buildings collapsed and 13 people died. Among the dead was a family of three while a child in the family sustained head injuries. Another family of four died in their collapsed home. Another four people died from heart attacks in various towns on the island. At least 200 people sustained injuries. Damage from the earthquake was estimated at US$400 (equivalent to $945.52 in 2025) million.

The earthquake damaged or destroyed at least 6,103 buildings. At least 5,133 of these affected structures damaged were in Syracuse, 929 in Catania and 41 in Ragusa. A manority of the 13,217 residents became homeless were from Syracuse. Railway on the Catania–Caltagirone–Gela and Messina–Syracuse lines were interrupted due to damaged communication, and stations of Brucoli and Scordia were seriously damaged. Public buildings including a hospital in Mineo and Scordia were also damaged. At a cemetery in Augusta, twelve coffins were shifted from their niches.

=== Response ===
The entire district with a population of 1,000 was evacuated as authorities deemed homes unsafe to occupy. Residents sought refuge in tents installed by soldiers. Another 600 people were displaced and slept in tents or hotels in Augusta.

Prior to the earthquake, the area conducted an emergency exercise simulating an earthquake with 500 casualties within a 40 km^{2} (15 sq mi) area. During the actual rescue and recovery efforts however, life-saving equipment did not perform as expected. The underperformance by rescue workers and equipment led to a criminal inquiry.

== See also ==
- List of earthquakes in 1990
- List of earthquakes in Italy
