= Chiesa Madre, Carlentini =

Church in Sicily, Italy

Chiesa Madre Immacolata Concezione
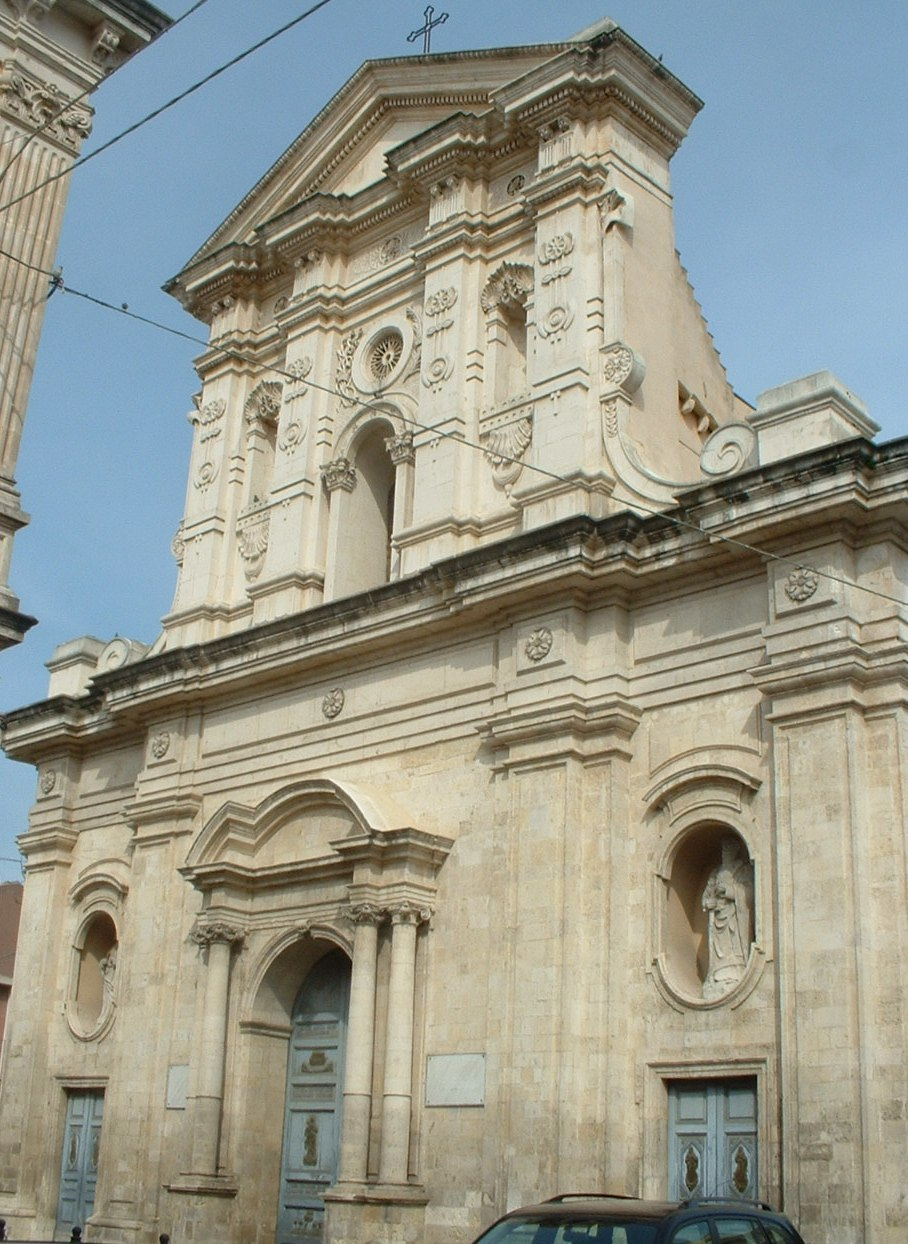
- Facade of church

Religion
- Affiliation: Catholic Church
- Province: Siracusa

Location
- Location: Carlentini, Sicily, Italy
- Interactive map of Chiesa Madre Immacolata Concezione
- Coordinates: 37°16′30″N 15°00′53″E

Architecture
- Type: Church
- Style: Baroque

Chiesa Madre or "Mother Church" of Carlentini is a baroque-style, Roman Catholic church located on via Via Roma #140, corner with via Garibaldi, in center of the town of Carlentini in the province of Syracuse, region of Sicily, Italy. The church is dedicated to the Immaculate Conception (Immacolata Concezione in Italian).

== Description ==
A church at this site was begun with the foundation of the town in 1551, under the patronage of the viceroy Giovanni De Vega, and completed by 1609. However, that structure was virtually razed by the 1693 Sicily earthquake, and reconstruction proceeded slowly over the next centuries. The main façade, only completed in 1913, has peculiar Art Nouveau (Liberty style) decoration on the second story and oval niches for the statues on the first story.

The interior has the traditional three naves divided by columns. The bell-tower was only completed in 1933. The present organ was donated by the Matarazzo family in 1941, to replace the prior 1742 organ. The interior is decorated with polychrome marble. The altar of the Holy Sacrament was frescoed (1804). The chapel of Santa Lucia, patron of the town was completed in 1831. It is decorated with the coat of arms of Charles V, Holy Roman Emperor, for whom the town was named. The central nave ceiling was frescoed with a representation of the Immaculate Conception with the Holy Trinity and St Michael Archangel. The church suffered some damage in the 1990 Carlentini earthquake, requiring repair.
