= 1990 Panay earthquake =

Earthquake in the Philippines

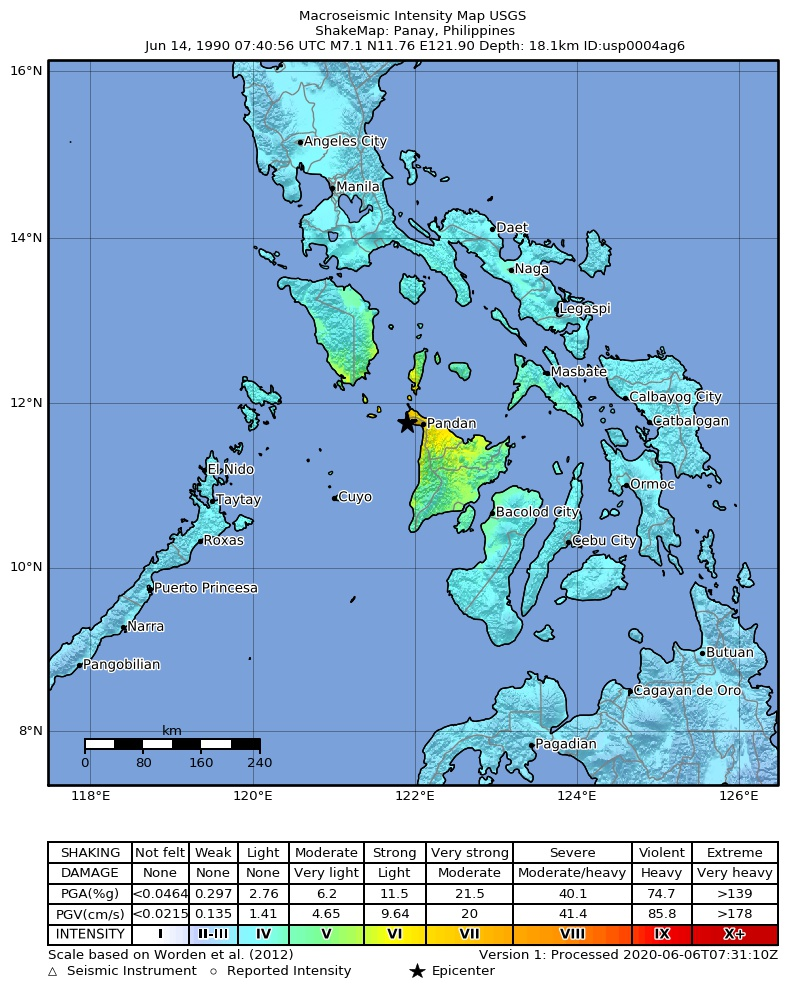
- USGS Macroseismic Intensity Map of the earthquake
- UTC time: 1990-06-14 07:40:56
- ISC event: 366142
- USGS-ANSS: ComCat
- Local date: June 14, 1990
- Local time: 3:41 p.m.
- Magnitude: 7.1 M_{w}
- Depth: 15 km (9.3 mi) (PHIVOLCS) 18.1 km (11.2 mi) (USGS)
- Epicenter: 11.34°N 122.10°E
- Areas affected: Panay Island
- Total damage: ₱30 million
- Max. intensity: PEIS VII (MMI VIII)
- Tsunami: No
- Landslides: Yes
- Casualties: 8 dead, 41 injured

The 1990 Panay earthquake occurred at 3:41 p.m. (PHT) on 14 June 1990 on the island of Panay in Visayas, Philippines. With a measured magnitude of 7.1 on the Richter scale, the earthquake left eight dead, 41 injured, and an estimated damage of ₱30 million.

== Earthquake ==
According to the Philippine Institute of Volcanology and Seismology (PHIVOLCS), the epicenter was located in the vicinity of Culasi, Antique on Panay Island. The earthquake had a depth of 15 km (9.3 mi) and was produced in the collisional zone off the western side of Panay Island by a fault movement. However, the United States Geological Survey (USGS) recorded the epicenter to be in Union, Libertad, Antique, and the depth of focus of the earthquake at 18.1 km (11.2 mi), deeper than what was recorded by PHIVOLCS. The shaking was felt strongly across Panay Island, while weak to moderate tremor was experienced in other parts of the Visayas, as well as in portions of Southern Luzon and Northern Mindanao.

Intensity distribution by location
PEIS	Location
VII	Culasi (Antique); Libacao (Aklan)
VI	Balete, Kalibo, Madalag, Numancia, Altavas, and Makato (Aklan); Sigma and Cuartero (Capiz); Calinog (Iloilo)
V	Northern part of Negros Island
IV	Romblon; the rest of Negros Island
III	Cebu City; Taal; Mayon; Palo (Leyte)
II	Cagayan de Oro; Camiguin Island

== Impact ==
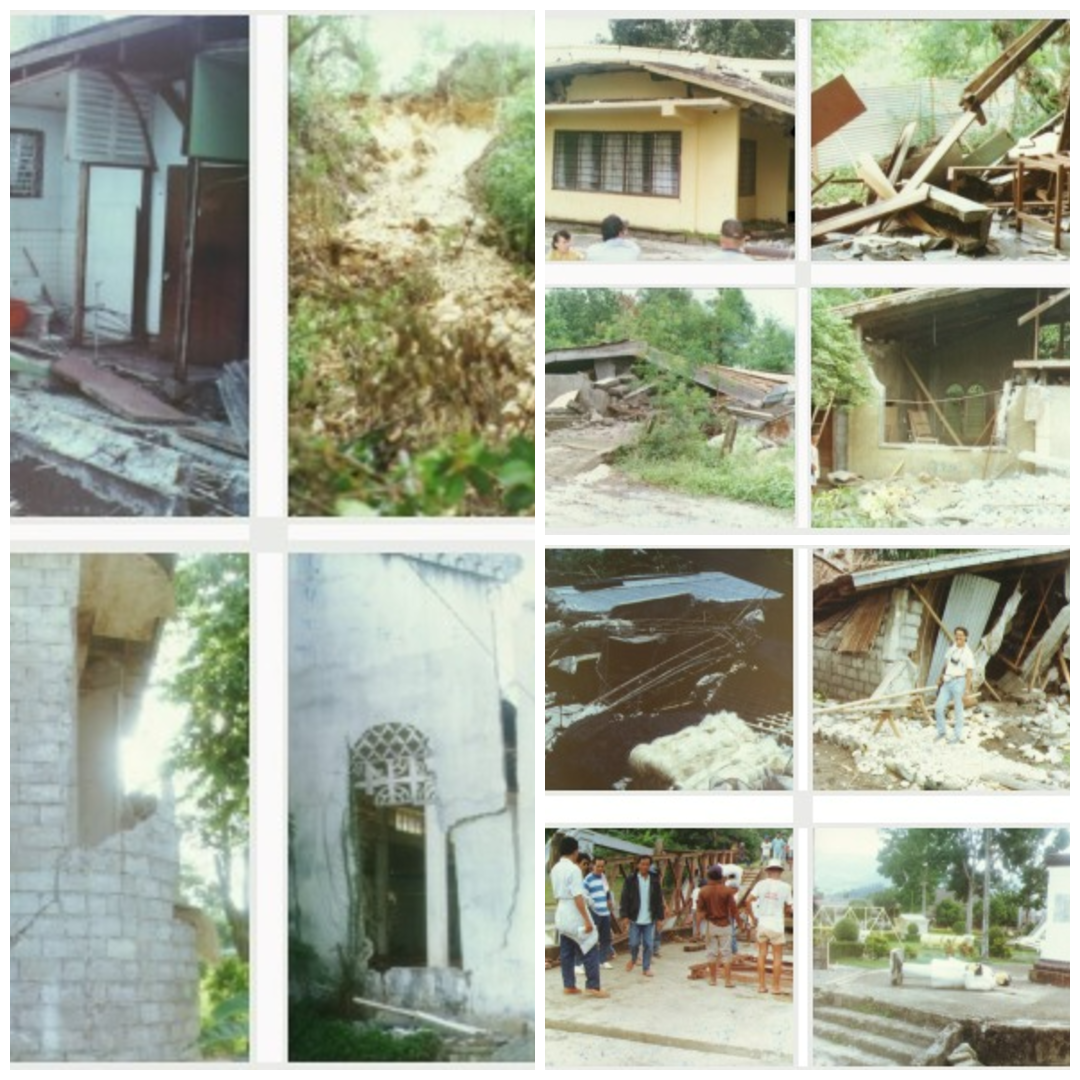
Situation in Panay Island following the earthquake.

=== Antique ===
In Culasi, approximately 15% of houses were destroyed, while many others sustained varying levels of damage. Several commercial buildings and at least four bridges collapsed. Fissures measuring up to tens of meters in length and nearly a meter in width were documented in two barangays, while localized tectonic uplift of approximately six meters occurred in Barangay Bagacay. Landslides occurred along the slopes of Mt. Madya-as, depositing large volumes of soil and rock. Dozens of families were displaced and evacuated. Overall, the quake resulted in seven fatalities and left 31 people injured.

=== Aklan ===
In Libacao, five concrete residential buildings were destroyed and 30 others sustained partial damage. Two churches and a river control project were heavily damaged, while five highway bridges suffered partial impairment. In Balete, one house collapsed and 10 others were partially damaged. The Baptist church and public market sustained heavy damage; a religious icon was toppled; the rural health center and a rice mill collapsed; and the district hospital was declared unsafe for future use. Additional impacts included partial destruction of another public market, damage to bridge approaches, and the formation of a ground fissure along a river. In Madalag, cracks were reported in both the municipal hall and district hospital buildings. In the capital, Kalibo, a local high school, a cinema, and a ceramic house were partially damaged, while cracks developed in the walls of Kalibo Cathedral. In Numancia, sand boils were observed. In Altavas, the wharf sustained partial damage, cracks were observed in the walls of the local church, and a religious icon was destroyed. In Makato, the sports complex sustained minor damage, while the posts and beams of the public market were also affected.

=== Capiz ===
Partial damage was reported to a church and several houses in Cuartero, as well as to a bridge and a communications tower in Sigma.

=== Iloilo ===
In Calinog, several buildings of the Philippine Constabulary Regional Command and the town's Catholic church sustained damage.

== See also ==
- List of earthquakes in 1990
- List of earthquakes in the Philippines
- 1990 Bohol and 1990 Luzon earthquakes – two notable earthquakes in the Philippines the same year
- 1948 Lady Caycay earthquake – a major historical earthquake in the same province
