= Lenin Peak disaster =

1990 earthquake and subsequent avalanche in Tajikistan

1990 Hindu Kush earthquake
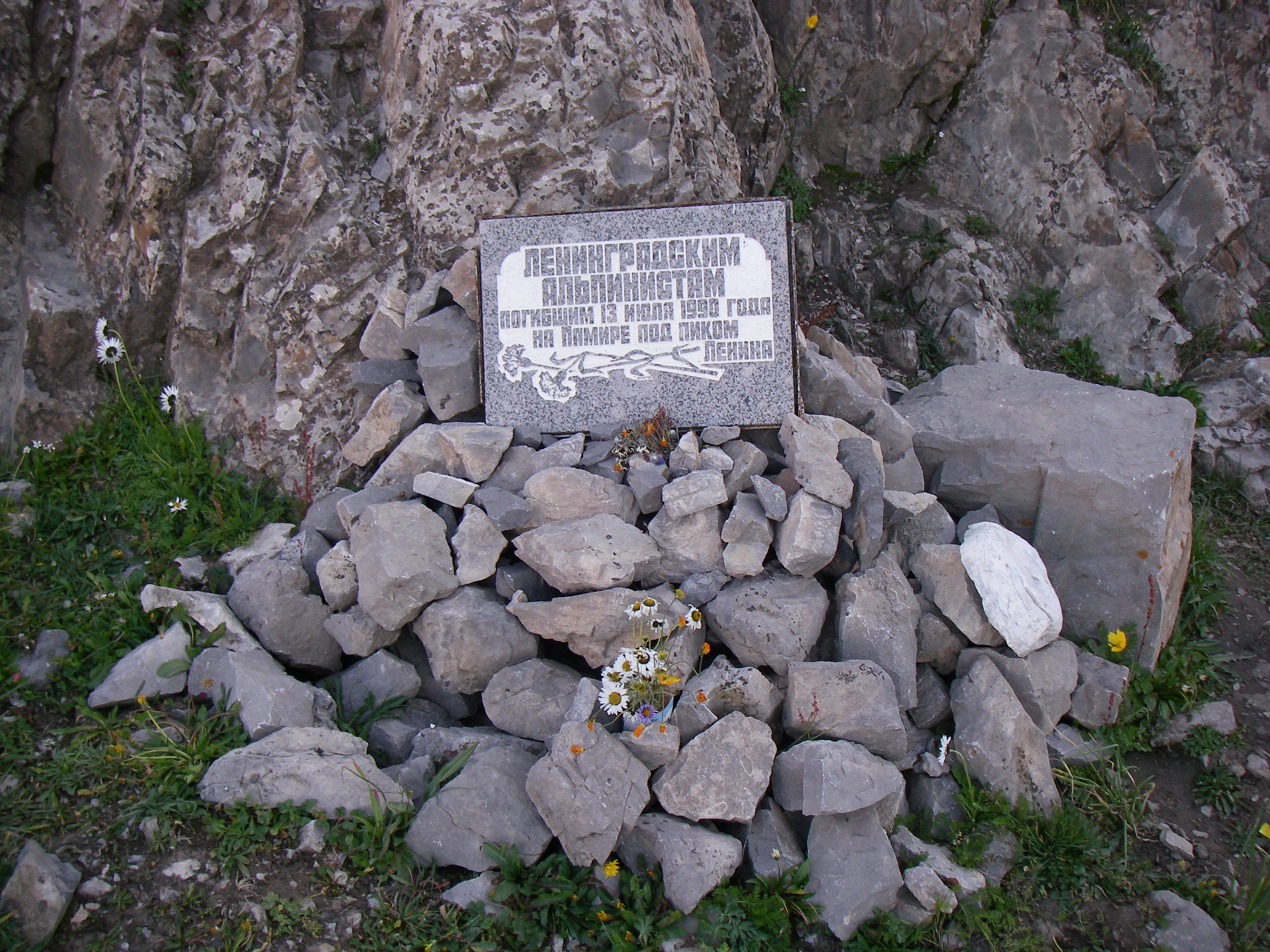
- A memorial plaque near Lenin Peak commemorating the victims of the disaster

- Location within Tajikistan
- UTC time: 1990-07-13 14:20:43
- ISC event: 362596
- USGS-ANSS: ComCat
- Local date: July 13, 1990
- Local time: 18:50:43 AFT
- Magnitude: M_{w} 6.4
- Depth: 216.8 km (134.7 mi)
- Epicenter: 36.372°N 70.738°E
- Max. intensity: MMI IV (Light)
- Casualties: 43 dead, 2 injured

The Lenin Peak disaster occurred on 13 July 1990 when 43 climbers were killed during an avalanche on the 7,134-meter-high mountain peak in northeast Tajikistan and Kyrgyzstan (then part of the USSR). The deadly avalanche was triggered by a moment magnitude scale 6.4 earthquake which struck at a depth of 216.8 km beneath the Hindu Kush mountains in neighbouring Afghanistan. The incident is believed to be the deadliest mountaineering disaster in history.

== Background ==
The ongoing continental collision between the Indian Plate and Eurasian Plate results in tectonic uplift, forming the Himalaya, Hindu Kush and Pamir Mountains. The two plates collide along a convergent plate boundary which includes the Main Himalayan Thrust. Broad crustal deformation caused by the Indian Plate ploughing into Eurasia causes uplift within the interior of Asia. This action created the Tibetan Plateau. Shallow earthquakes occur on faults that accommodate the tectonic stresses caused by the collision. Some of the largest earthquakes have exceeded magnitude 8.0, while even moderately large 6.0 events have resulted in thousands of fatalities. Most of these earthquakes are associated with reverse, thrust, or strike-slip faulting.

The earthquake on 13 July did not originate from within a shallow fault; rather it struck at a depth of 216.8 km beneath the surface; far too deep for a shallow crustal source. Where the earthquake occurred, is an "earthquake nest"; an area of high seismicity in a particularly small region. Large earthquakes with magnitudes of up to 7.5 have occurred in the same concentrated region with an average recurrence interval of 15 years. These earthquakes correspond to reverse faulting at a depth of 170 to 280 km. These earthquakes rather than occurring at a plate boundary, are sourced from within the Indian Plate as it dives beneath the Hindu Kush. As the tectonic slab of the Indian Plate descends at a near-vertical angle into the mantle, it stretches and begins to "tear", eventually leading to a slab detachment. This action results in stress accommodation along faults that produces earthquakes when ruptured.

== Avalanche ==
At the time of the quake, 45 mountaineers were at Camp II, at an elevation of 5,300 meters on the Razdelnaya Route to summit the peak. The team consisted of 23 members of the Leningrad Mountaineering Club, six from Czechoslovakia, four Israelis, two Swiss, and a Spaniard. Many of the Soviet fatalities originated from the Russian city of Leningrad, as Saint Petersburg was known during Soviet times.

The earthquake caused light shaking, assigned IV on the Mercalli intensity scale, but was significant enough to cause a block of serac to detach and tumble down Lenin Peak. The dislodged serac transformed into an avalanche that crashed onto the camp, killing 43 of the 45 climbers. The two survivors, Alexei Koren and Miroslav Brozman, suffered a broken arm and leg. According to them, some team members were still conscious after the avalanche buried them, but rescue attempts failed when the debris hardened into glacier ice. Survivors and witnesses on the mountain did not report any shaking from the earthquake, presumably because the ice acted like a shock absorber.

The disaster is the worst in the history of mountaineering, alongside the 2014 Nepal snowstorm disaster. The death toll from the incident surpassed that of another event in 1974. Only one body was recovered. In 2008, the glacier ice began to melt, exposing human remains of the expedition.

== See also ==
- List of avalanches by death toll
- List of mountaineering disasters by death toll
- List of earthquakes in 1990
- List of earthquakes in Afghanistan
- List of earthquakes in Tajikistan
- List of earthquakes in Kyrgyzstan
