= Carlentini =

- Comune
- Comune di Carlentini
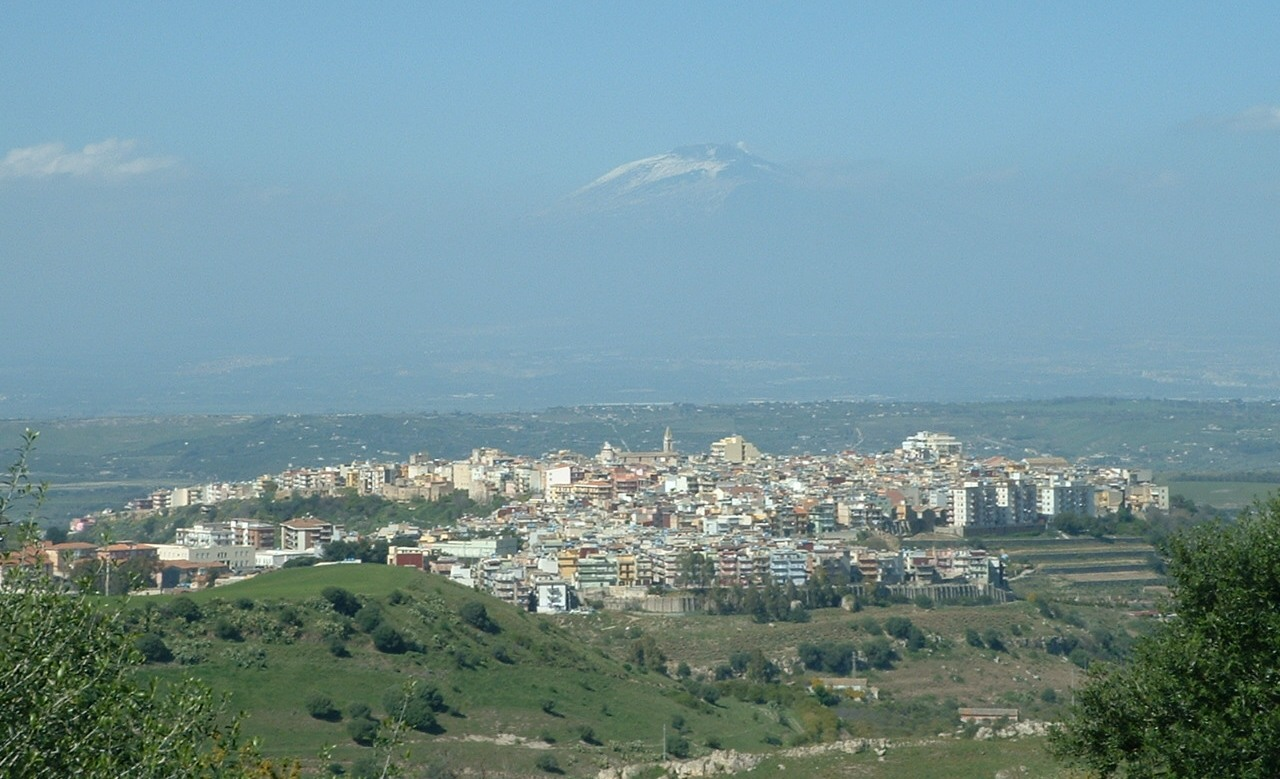

- Coat of arms

- Location within Italy Location within Sicily
- Coordinates: 37°17′N 15°01′E
- Country: Italy
- Region: Sicily
- Province: Syracuse (SR)
- Frazioni: Pedagaggi, Carlentini Nord

Government
  - Mayor: Giuseppe Stefio (since 2018-06-13)

Area
  - Total: 157 km^{2} (61 sq mi)
- Elevation: 218 m (715 ft)

Population (31 December 2007)
  - Total: 17,509
  - Density: 112/km^{2} (289/sq mi)
- Demonym: Carlentinesi
- Time zone: UTC+1 (CET)
  - Summer (DST): UTC+2 (CEST)
- Postal code: 96013
- Dialing code: 095
- Patron saint: St. Lucy
- Saint day: December 13 and 4th Sunday in August

Carlentini (Sicilian: Carruntini) is a town and comune in the Province of Syracuse, Sicily (Italy). It lies 45 km (28 mi) outside the provincial capital of Syracuse.

== Naming history ==
In 1551, Viceroy Juan de Vega, 1st Count of Grajal, founded a new city in honour of Charles V, Holy Roman Emperor, naming it with the Latin name of Carleontini (lit. 'Leontini of Carlo'). Eventually, the town came to simply be known in Sicilian as Carrintini or Carruntini which, in modern Italian, became Carlentini.

== Attractions ==
=== Religious sites ===
- Chiesa Madre dedicated to the Immacolata Concezione
- Santa Maria di Roccadia
- San Sebastiano
- Madonna delle Grazie

== Twinning ==
Carlentini is twinned with the following places:

- Santa Luċija, Malta
- Omaha, Nebraska, United States

== See also ==
- 1990 Carlentini earthquake
- Lentini
