= 1990 Gonghe earthquake =

Earthquake in Tibet

- Location within Qinghai Location within China
- UTC time: 1990-04-26 09:37:15
- ISC event: 373782
- 373783
- USGS-ANSS: ComCat
- Local date: 26 April 1990
- Local time: 17:37 CST
- Magnitude: 7.0 M_{s}
- Depth: 8.1 km (5.0 mi)
- Epicenter: 35.986°N 100.245°E
- Type: Reverse
- Areas affected: China
- Max. intensity: MMI IX (Violent)
- Casualties: 126 dead

The 1990 Gonghe earthquake occurred on April 26 at 17:37 China Standard Time in Hainan Tibetan Autonomous Prefecture, Qinghai Province. The mainshock had a surface wave magnitude of 7.0 M_{s} and a moment magnitude of 6.5 M_{w}. It was presaged by two foreshocks that struck merely seconds before the main earthquake. On the Mercalli intensity scale, the earthquake had a rating of IX (Violent).

== Damage ==
At least 126 people died and 2,049 left wounded by the earthquake. Landslides and extensive destruction was reported in the area. Damage to properties was major, with 21,000 homes collapsing and another 66,800 damaged. The Longyangxia Reservoir about 60 km away from the earthquake experienced strong shaking which triggered landslides but its nearby power plant and dam were in normal working conditions. Total damage caused by the earthquake is estimated at 270 million Chinese Yuan.

In the zone with the highest intensity, IX, encompassing Gonghe County, all brick and adobe constructed houses were razed. About 320 wood-framed and mud-walled settlements were destroyed, the only 12 left standing suffered serious damage. Brick and concrete bungalows did not collapse but they were severely compromised after the earthquake. In zones with intensities VII and VIII, more homes collapsed, causing casualties. Some old houses in zone VI also collapsed.

== Characteristics ==
The earthquake in the northeastern Tibetan Plateau according to seismologists, ruptured a blind thrust fault structure due to the absence of a surface rupture. Elements of both sinistral strike-slip and reverse components were detected during the co-seismic rupture, with the latter having a greater sense. The estimated length and width of the rupture is 37 km and 6 km respectively, with a slip of around 2.7 meters.

== See also ==
- List of earthquakes in 1990
- List of earthquakes in China
