= C/1989 X1 (Austin) =

Hyperbolic comet

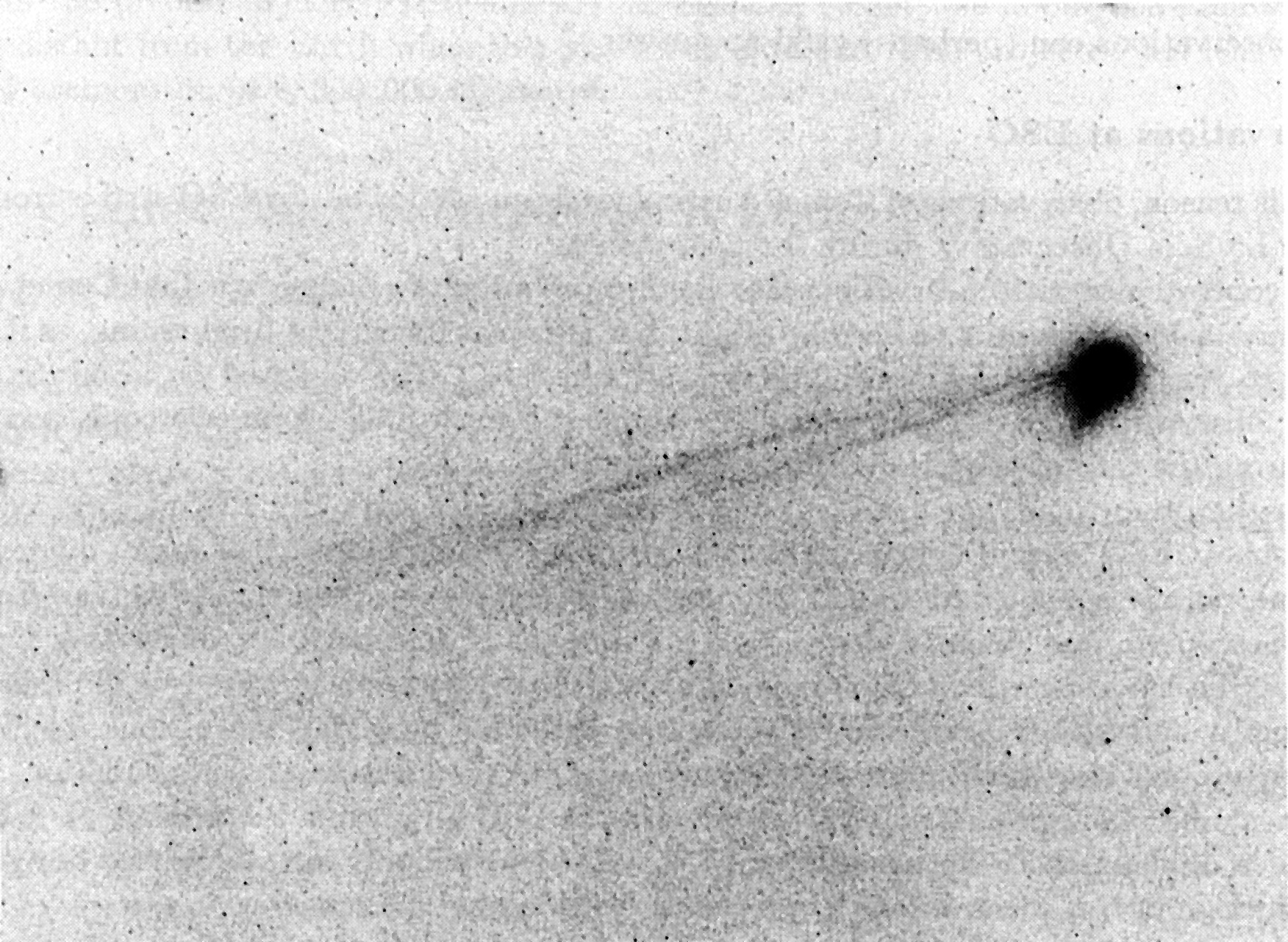
- The comet on February 24, 1990, by La Silla Observatory, ESO

Discovery
- Discovered by: Rodney R. D. Austin
- Discovery site: New Plymouth, NZ
- Discovery date: 6 December 1989

Designations
- Alternative designations: 1989c1 1990 V

Orbital characteristics
- Epoch: 17 April 1990 (JD 2447998.5)
- Observation arc: 203 days
- Number of observations: 266
- Perihelion: 0.349 AU
- Eccentricity: 1.0002278
- Inclination: 58.956°
- Longitude of ascending node: 75.925°
- Argument of periapsis: 61.576°
- Last perihelion: 9 April 1990
- Earth MOID: 0.1386 AU
- Jupiter MOID: 2.2159 AU

Physical characteristics
- Mean radius: 1.24 km (0.77 mi) (Note: Calculated mean radius using the formula: $\log_{10}\,(\,R\,)\ =\;0.9 +\;0.13 (\,H\,)$ Where $\,H\,$ is the comet's absolute total magnitude (M1))
- Comet total magnitude (M1): 6.2
- Apparent magnitude: 4–6 (1990 apparition)

C/1989 X1 (Austin) (old-style designations 1990 V and 1989c1) was a comet discovered by New Zealand amateur Rodney R. D. Austin on December 6, 1989. The comet at discovery was predicted to become easily visible by naked eye in spring 1990, however it failed to become that bright.

== Observations ==
Rodney Austin discovered the comet on December 6, 1989, through an 8-inch Schmidt–Newtonian telescope, and it was his third comet discovery after C/1982 M1 and C/1984 N1. By the time of its discovery, it was already obvious that it must be a large object, as the comet was still more than 350 million kilometres (2.42 AU) from the Sun and yet it was so bright that it was seen as an 11th magnitude object (that is, 1/100 as bright as what can be perceived with the unaided eye).

More observations were soon made, establishing the comet's orbit, and it was found that it would pass through its perihelion (the point of its orbit where it is closest to the Sun) on 9 April 1990 at a distance of about 53 million kilometres, inside the orbit of Mercury, the planet closest to the Sun, and it would come within 38 million kilometres of the Earth on May 25. The orbit indicated that after 20 April 1990 it could be seen in the northern hemisphere low above the NW horizon, just after sunset, and even better above the NE horizon, shortly before sunrise, and it was expected to develop an easily observable tail which would be a grand celestial view. Its high eccentricity, above 1, indicated that it was a dynamically new object from the Oort cloud.

The comet was at 83 degrees elongation from the Sun at discovery and nearly circumpolar for the southern hemisphere. The comet slowly moved northwards and passed the equator on March 21, 1990, however its elongation from the Sun, around 25 degrees, meant it was difficult to observe. After perihelion, the comet would start to move gradually away from the Sun and at the time of the closest approach to Earth would be 100 degrees away from the Sun, at the constellation of Aquila and moving southward.

A long ion tail was observed on late February 1990. However, as the comet approached to perihelion the rate of brightening started to slow when it was 1.56 to 1.27 AU away from the Sun and although activity increased again in April, the comet ended up about 6 magnitudes dimmer than expected at maximum brightness, being dimmer than magnitude 2, with most observations reporting a maximum brightness between +4 and +6. The comet was visible with naked eye between May 5 and May 25, 1990, before fading below naked eye visibility.

== Scientific results ==
=== Spectrum ===
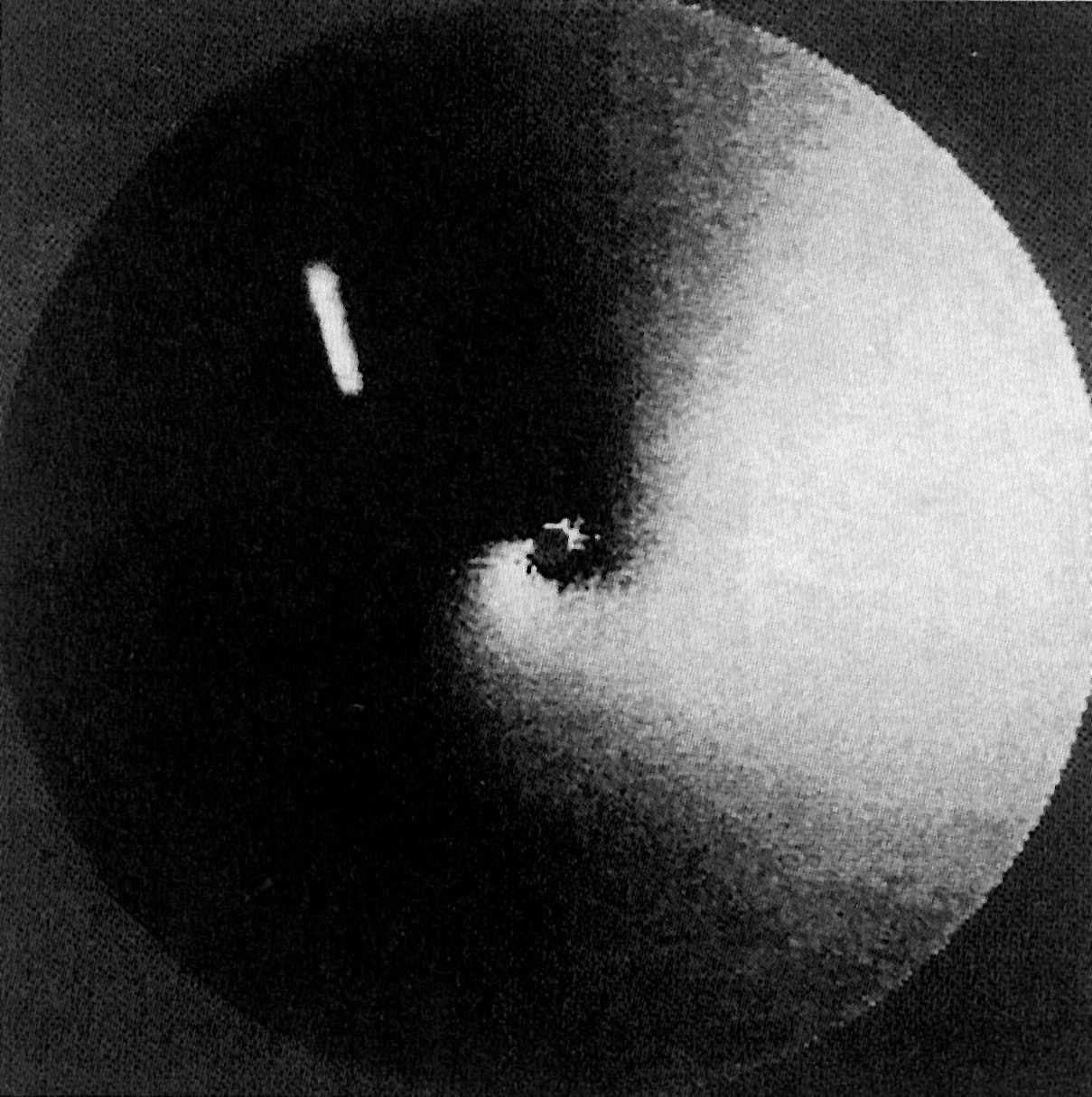
A jet observed by NTT on February 9, 1990.

The spectrum of the comet upon discovery showed the presence of hydroxyl emission and continuum from the dust, however the presence of dust was noted to be unusually low. The spectrum also revealed the presence of gases like cyanide, CO_{2}+, and diatomic carbon. Further observations of the spectrum of the comet revealed the presence of the forbidden oxygen line (1128 Å) and the absence of features attributed to helium, argon and diatomic nitrogen.

The millimetre spectrum of the comet, by the radiotelescope of IRAM, showed the presence of hydrogen cyanide, formaldehyde, hydrogen sulphide and methanol, and was the first time the latter two were observed in the spectrum of a comet.

=== Infrared and radio observations ===
The comet was imaged in infrared by the COBE satellite on May 6, 1990, and revealed the presence of a dust tail 6 degrees long at 12 and 25 micrometres. The tail exhibited complex structure that was attributed to the variations of the dust production rate of the comet, which was estimated to be 510+510
−205 kg/s. It was estimated that the nucleus of the comet was covered mainly by particles measuring 20 micrometers in diameter. The comet was also observed by the Golden Gopher infrared camera with 8 to 12 micrometer filters, the first time this camera was used to observe a comet. The images didn't show the presence of jets or shells and the coma appeared slightly elongated. It was estimated by these observations that the comet lost about a tonne of material every second on May 6, and fell to 570 kilos per second on May 12.

Observations of the comet with polarimeter revealed the presence of jets and shells, common characteristics of a comet. It was also observed that the dust particles of the comet had higher albedo than usual. Other photopolarimetric observations estimated the size of the main dust particles to be 0.1 to 0.5 μm. The cyanide and diatomic carbon had polarisation close to the predicted one, but the triatomic carbon had lower polarisation than the predicted one.

On May 13, 1990, as the tail of comet Austin passed in front of the quasar 3C 441, it enhanced the scintillations in radio waves.
