= Anatomy of a Disaster =

Philippine television documentary show

- Promotional image
- Genre: Documentary
- Based on: Earth's Fury
- Directed by: Rico Gutierrez
- Presented by: Richard Gutierrez
- Country of origin: Philippines
- Original language: Tagalog
- No. of episodes: 13

Production
- Executive producer: Mae Zambrano
- Camera setup: Multiple-camera setup
- Running time: 30–45 minutes
- Production company: GMA Entertainment TV

Original release
- Network: GMA Network
- Release: August 22, 2010 – November 6, 2011

Anatomy of a Disaster is a Philippine television documentary show broadcast by GMA Network. Hosted by Richard Gutierrez, it premiered on August 22, 2010. The show concluded on November 6, 2011.

== Overview ==
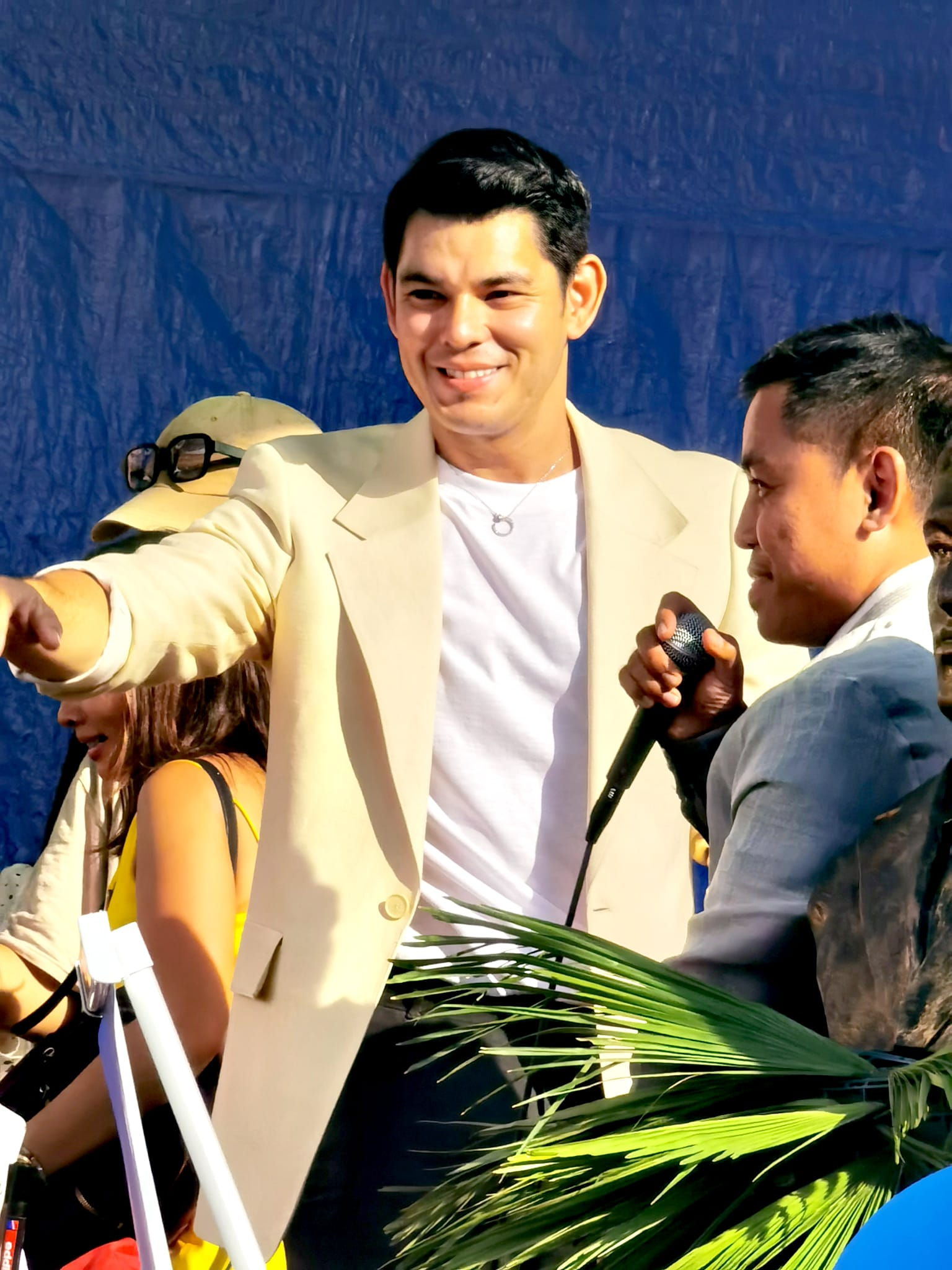
Richard Gutierrez served as a host.

Considered to be a more comprehensive version of Richard's former infotainment show Full Force Nature, Anatomy of a Disaster features different stories of tragedy, survival, and heroism based on the GRB Entertainment-produced documentary series Earth's Fury (also known as Anatomy of Disaster). Each of the episodes provides an account of various natural disasters such as volcanic eruption, flood, hurricane, earthquake, and climate change, among others, in both local and international contexts.

== Episodes ==
Anatomy of a Disaster episodes
No.	Title	Original release date
1	"Anatomy of a Disaster"	August 22, 2010
2	"Ragasa ng Panganib"	September 26, 2010
3	"Bagsik ng Magma"	October 31, 2010
4	"Urban Inferno"	November 14, 2010
5	"Himagsik Ng Kalikasan"	January 23, 2011
6	"Lagalag Ng Kalikasan"	February 20, 2011
7	"Week Long Special"	March 21, 2011
8	"Nag-aapoy Na Unos"	April 24, 2011
9	"Ang Puot ng Karagatan"	May 22, 2011
10	"Lakas ng Karagatan"	June 26, 2011
11	"Superstorms/Mga Mukha ng Peligro"	July 24, 2011
12	"Flash Floods"	August 21, 2011
13	"Landslides"	September 25, 2011
14	"Alerto sa Bagyo" (transl. alert in typhoon)	November 6, 2011

== Ratings ==
According to AGB Nielsen Philippines' Mega Manila People/Individual television ratings, the pilot episode of Anatomy of a Disaster earned a 6.6% rating.

== Accolades ==
Accolades received by Anatomy of a Disaster
Year	Award	Category	Recipient	Result	Ref.
2011	8th Golden Screen TV Awards	Outstanding Natural History/Wildlife Program	Anatomy of a Disaster	Nominated	
2011	8th Golden Screen TV Awards	Outstanding Natural History/Wildlife Program Host	Richard Gutierrez	Nominated	
2011	25th PMPC Star Awards for Television	Best Documentary Special	Anatomy of a Disaster	Nominated	
