= Movie Magic =

Movie Magic may refer to:

- Movie Magic Special Effects Show, a 1991 live show at the Warner Bros. Movie World amusement park at Oxenford, Gold Coast, Queensland, Australia
- Movie Magic Screenwriter, a word processing program first released in 1994 and intended to format screenplays, teleplays and novels
- Mega Movie Magic, an American television documentary program
- J.K. Rowling's Wizarding World: Movie Magic, a series of three volumes of Wizarding World books
