= Michael Bell (actor) =

American actor (born 1938)

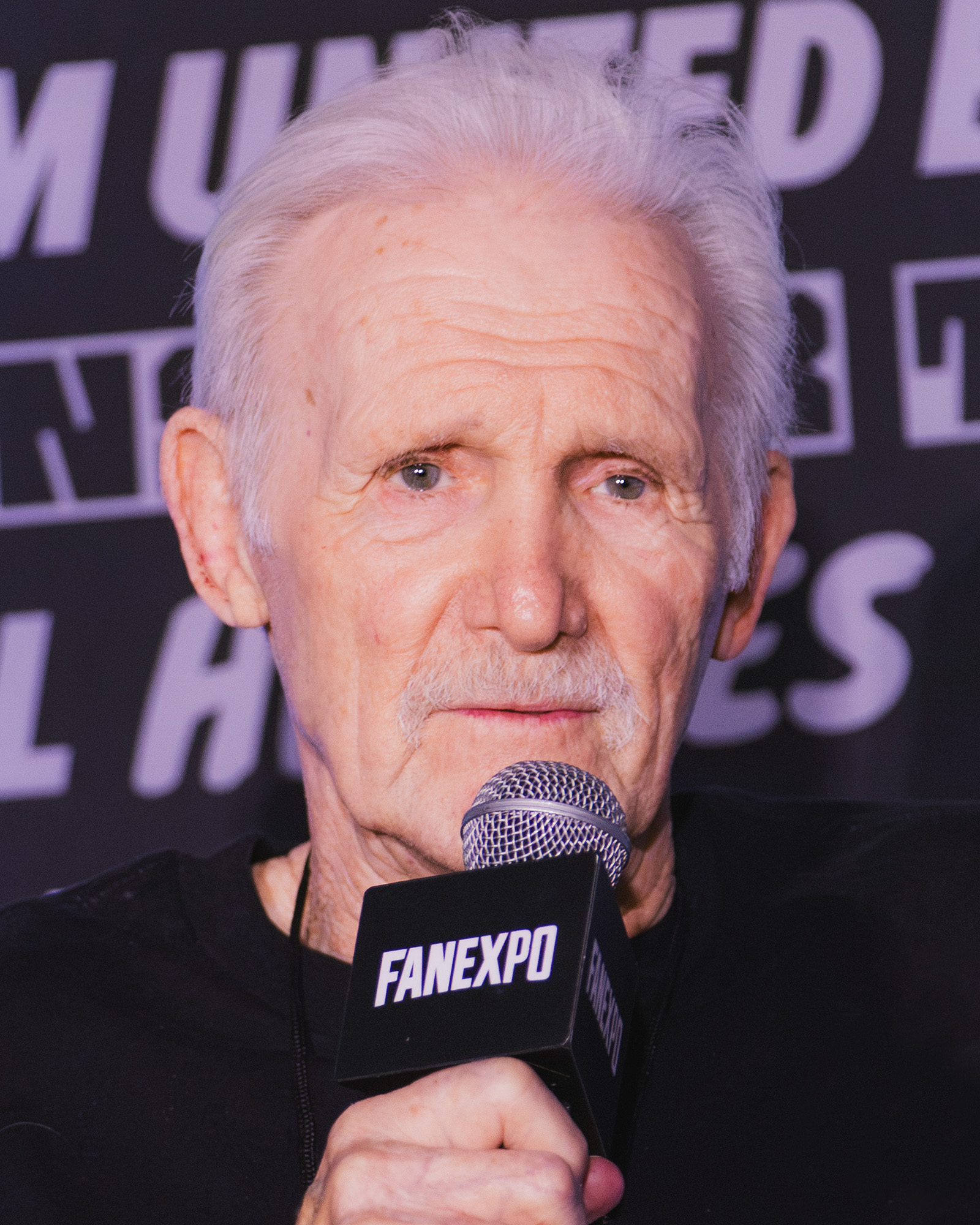
- Bell in 2026
- Born: July 30, 1938 (age 88); Brooklyn, New York, U.S.
- Occupation: Actor
- Years active: 1956–present
- Spouse: Victoria Carroll (m. 1984)
- Children: Ashley Bell
- Website: michaelbellvoices.com

Michael Bell (born July 30, 1938) is an American actor who is most active in voice over roles. He has acted in video games and animated series, including Legacy of Kain, The Transformers, G.I. Joe: A Real American Hero, The Houndcats, Rugrats, The Smurfs, The Incredible Hulk and Snorks and appeared on-screen in film and television, including the TV programs Dallas and Star Trek.

== Early life ==
Michael Bell was born on July 30, 1938, in Brooklyn, New York, to a Jewish family.

== Career ==
=== Live-action roles ===
His live action film career has included roles in films such as Thunder Alley (1967), Blue (1968), The Proud Rider (1971) Brother John (1971), Rollercoaster (1977), Fast Company (1979), How to Beat the High Cost of Living (1980) and C.H.U.D. II: Bud the C.H.U.D. (1989). Bell also appeared in live-action exploitation shorts and PSAs - scare films made in California during the early 1960s, ranging in content from venereal disease (Damaged Goods) to psychedelic drug abuse (Trip To Where).

He appeared in the Star Trek: The Next Generation pilot episode, "Encounter at Farpoint", as Bandi administrator Groppler Zorn, and in the Star Trek: Deep Space Nine episodes "The Homecoming" as a Bajoran and in "The Maquis."

Bell appeared in multiple episodes of Dallas as Les Crowley during the 1980–81 season, in M*A*S*H in the episode "Souvenirs" as Willie Stratton and also guest starred in two episodes of Three's Company as Rama Mageesh and Michael, a sleazy dance instructor in the sixth-season episode "Some of That Jazz" (1981). Bell played Bill Duncan, Sabrina (Kate Jackson)'s ex-husband on Charlie's Angels, as well as appearing as King Edward Spencer on Jackson's series Scarecrow and Mrs. King. In 1970, he appeared in an episode of The Silent Force.

=== 1970s and 1980s voice work ===
Bell had an important part in animated entertainment in the 1970s and 1980s. His first voice role was that of Stutz, the leader of The Houndcats. In 1973, he was Mark on the Hanna-Barbera series Speed Buggy. He voiced Redbeard the Pirate's Ghost in The New Scooby-Doo Movies episode "The Ghostly Creep from the Deep" as the second Redbeard themed monster in Scooby-Doo. Bell also reprised Mark on the same cartoon in the episode "Weird Winds of Winona".

From 1977 to 1984, Michael Bell played two of his best-known roles, Zan and Gleek on various Super Friends incarnations. He also voiced The Riddler on Challenge of the Superfriends. He also provided the voice of Lex Luthor as a young man, in the episode "History of Doom". However, Stan Jones was the voice of the adult Luthor throughout the series. Bell later played Luthor in the 1988 Superman series.

He was also Doctor Ben Cooper in Jana of the Jungle and in 1979, he voiced the title character of The Plastic Man Comedy/Adventure Show and later made a guest appearance as Doctor Octopus in another superhero show, Spider-Man and His Amazing Friends.

Outside of animation, Bell performed on records and commercials, including the Young Man in A&M Records' Story of Halloween Horror album in 1977, and Parkay Margarine and Mug Root Beer ads. Bell provided the overdubbing of Peter Criss' dialogue in the band KISS's TV movie KISS Meets the Phantom of the Park. In 1980, he provided the voice of the title character in The B.B. Beegle Show, an unsold TV show pilot that featured puppets.

Throughout the 1980s, Michael Bell starred in four hit animated series;

- as Grouchy Smurf, Lazy Smurf, Handy Smurf and Johan in The Smurfs
- as Prowl, Scrapper, Sideswipe, Bombshell, First Aid, Swoop, Gort, Brainstorm and Doctor Fujiyama in The Transformers and The Transformers: The Movie
- as Duke, Xamot, Blowtorch and numerous others in G.I. Joe: A Real American Hero and G.I. Joe: The Movie
- as Lance & Sven in Voltron: Defender of the Universe.

He also starred in the 1982 animated series The Incredible Hulk. The Hulk was voiced by Bob Holt, while his human side, Bruce Banner, was played by Bell. In a 2004 interview, Bell joked about how Holt would be annoyed that he was growling his throat out, while Bell's acting was much easier on his throat.

During this time, the actor also played Hiro Taka on Spiral Zone and Allstar Seaworthy on The Snorks (1984-1989)

=== Later voice work ===
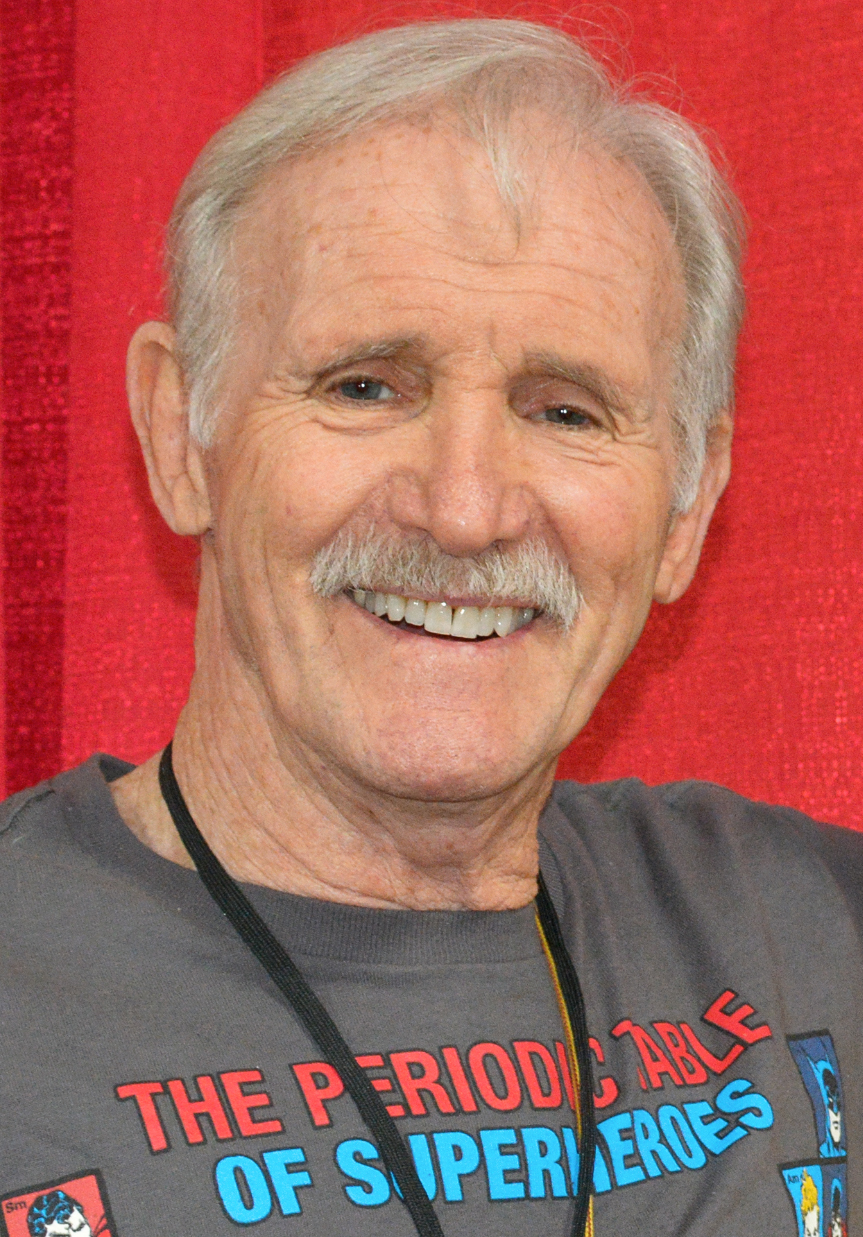
Bell at the 2015 Retro Con

Bell continues to work in animation in the 1990s and into the 21st century in movies and television, with roles such as Quackerjack from Disney's Darkwing Duck, Aziz on Aladdin and Ezekiel Rage on The Real Adventures of Jonny Quest. He was also featured as Opus in the Bloom County television special A Wish for Wings That Work.

From 1991 to 2004, in the Rugrats and All Grown Up!, he voiced three of the main characters' parents; Drew Pickles, Charles Finster Sr., and Boris Kropotkin.

Bell did the voices of Drake on W.I.T.C.H., Max Hauser, Duke's Dad on G.I. Joe: Renegades, Willy Wachowski on Handy Manny and additional roles in Tangled (2010).

In 2018, Bell reprised his role as Quackerjack on the reboot of DuckTales.

=== Video game voice work ===
He is also a prolific voice in video games, which include Soldier of Fortune II: Double Helix, Warcraft III: Reign of Chaos, Diablo II: Lord of Destruction, Age of Empires III, Baldur's Gate, Ratchet & Clank, the character Dark Fact in the game Ys I & II, and the character Raziel in four games in the Legacy of Kain series, among many others. He also plays the Fear in Metal Gear Solid 3: Snake Eater.

=== Documentary narration ===
He narrated the documentary programs Earth's Fury (also known as Anatomy of Disaster internationally), Expeditions to the Edge, Bullet Catchers and Mysteries of Asia, while he narrated some episodes of E! True Hollywood Story.

=== Stage roles ===
In 1983, he and his future wife Victoria Carroll opened The West End Playhouse in Van Nuys. The two of them organized, wrote, directed, and acted in dozens of productions.

One of the most notable was The Ladies of the Camillias in which Bell played the villain Ivan and Victoria starred as Madame Sarah Bernhardt. The play won multiple Drama Logue Awards.

He served as the theater's director until 1988, when by mutual agreement to devote more time to their child, Bell and Carroll sold the theater to Edmund Gaynes and Pamela Hall.

=== Voice director ===
Bell was the voice director for Kidd Video, Peter Pan and the Pirates, as well as the web series The LeBrons.

== Union activism ==
On March 30, 2012, the Screen Actors Guild (SAG) and the American Federation of Television and Radio Artists (AFTRA) completed a merger of equals forming a new union SAG-AFTRA. As a result of this merger, a group of actors including Bell, fellow voice actors Wendy Schaal, Clancy Brown, Schaal's former stepmother Valerie Harper, and other actors including former SAG President Edward Asner, Martin Sheen, Ed Harris, and Nancy Sinatra immediately sued against the current SAG President Ken Howard and several SAG Vice Presidents to overturn the merger and separate the (now merged) two unions because of their claims that the election was improper. The plaintiffs dropped their lawsuit several months later.

== Inventor ==
In 1991, Bell and his colleague Melanie Chartoff conceived the Grayway Rotating Drain, a graywater recycling device for reuse of shower and sink water in the home. The following year, they finished and patented the product with the help of Ronald K. Ford.

== Personal life ==
Bell has been married to actress Victoria Carroll since 1984. Together they have a daughter, Ashley Bell, who is also an actress. He is an animal rights activist. He is the godfather of actor Steve Guttenberg, who cites Bell as his inspiration to become an actor.

Bell served on the board of directors of the Los Angeles Local of SAG-AFTRA in 2016 until 2019.

== Filmography ==
=== Film ===
==== Live-action ====
Year	Title	Role	Notes	References
1967	Thunder Alley	Leroy Johnson		
1967	Point Blank	2nd Penthouse Lobby Guard		
1968	Blue	Jim Benton		
1971	Brother John	Cleve		
1977	Rollercoaster	Chuck Demerest		
1977	Star Wars	General Vanden Willard	Voice	
1979	Fast Company	Chuck Randall		
1980	How to Beat the High Cost of Living	Tom		
1989	C.H.U.D. II: Bud the C.H.U.D.	Mr. Williams	Uncredited	
2010	Furry Vengeance	Background voices	Voice	

==== Animation ====
Year	Title	Role	Notes	References
1961	Damaged Goods	Monk		
1968	Trip to Where	Joe Hennessey		
1976	Davy Crockett on the Mississippi	Honeysuckle, Settler, Pete	Television film	
1982	Heidi's Song	Willie		
1983	The Wind in the Willows	Ratty		
1985	Star Fairies	Freddy Flawless, Frump, Spectre		
1986	GoBots: Battle of the Rock Lords	Granite, Narligator, Slimestone		
1986	My Little Pony: The Movie	Grundle		
1986	The Transformers: The Movie	Scrapper, Swoop, Junkions		
1987	G.I. Joe: The Movie	Duke, Lift Ticket, Xamot		
1987	The Brave Little Toaster	Television Announcer		
1987	The Little Troll Prince	Krill, Kristi and Sonja's Father, Ribo	Television film	
1988	Rockin' with Judy Jetson	Quasar	Television film	
1988	The Good, the Bad, and Huckleberry Hound	Bailiff, Laughing Donkey, Longhorn Steer, Station Announcer, Stinky Dalton	Television film	
1989	Little Nemo: Adventures in Slumberland	Oompy		
1990	Jetsons: The Movie	Board Member #1		
1991	A Wish for Wings That Work	Opus the Penguin		
1992	Tom and Jerry: The Movie	Ferdinand, Straycatcher #1		
1993	Hollyrock-a-Bye Baby	Mr. Pyrite	Television film	
1993	I Yabba-Dabba Do!	Mr. Pyrite	Television film	
1996	Homeward Bound II: Lost in San Francisco	Stokey		
1997	Cats Don't Dance	Lil' Ark Angels Announcer		
1997	The Ugly Duckling	Fox		
1998	The Rugrats Movie	Chaz Finster, Drew Pickles, Boris Kropotkin		
1999	Alvin and the Chipmunks Meet Frankenstein	Victor Frankenstein		
2000	Rugrats in Paris: The Movie	Chaz Finster, Drew Pickles		
2003	Rugrats Go Wild	Chaz Finster, Drew Pickles		
2004	Home on the Range	Horse		
2004	Scooby-Doo! and the Loch Ness Monster	Duncan MacGubbin, McIntyre		
2006	Cars	Additional voices		
2007	Ratatouille	Damaged Rat		
2010	Tangled	Guard		
2015	The Prophet	Old Olive Man, Male Villagers		
2021	Luca	Additional voices		

=== Television ===
==== Live-action ====
Year	Title	Role	Notes	References
1965	Gomer Pyle - U.S.M.C.	Garson	Episode: "PFC Gomer Pyle"	
1967	The Monkees	Artist	Episode: "Art, for Monkees' Sake"	
1967	Get Smart	Brute	Episode: "The Mild Ones"	
1968	Here Come the Brides	Roger	Episode: "A Christmas Place"	
1969	Mission: Impossible	Captain Anders	Episode: "The Exchange"	
1969	The Big Valley	Charlie Travis	Episode: "Joshua Watson"	
1970–74	Mannix	Larry	Episode: "Sunburst"	
1970–74	Mannix	Bob Greer	Episode: "To Draw the Lightning"	
1970–74	Mannix	Dana Croft	Episode: "The Crimson Halo"	
1970–74	Mannix	Larsen	Episode: "Picture of a Shadow"	
1972	The Heist	John Cadiski	ABC Movie of the Week	
1973	Tenafly	Steve Hall	Episode: "Joyride to Nowhere"	
1973	The F.B.I.	Parent	Episode: "Fatal Reunion"	
1973	Kibbee and Fitch	Russell Kibbee	Television film	
1974	The Law	Cliff Wilson	Television film	
1974–75	Cannon	Delaney	Episode: "The Hit Man"	
1974–75	Cannon	Thomas Lockner	Episode: "The Deadly Conspiracy: Part 1"	
1975	Barnaby Jones	Thomas Lochner	Episode: "The Deadly Conspiracy: Part 2"	
1975, 1977	The Streets of San Francisco	Robert O'Brien	Episode: "No Place to Hide"	
1975, 1977	The Streets of San Francisco	Nick Malone	Episode: "One Last Trick"	
1976–77	The Rockford Files	Richard Stehler	Episode: "The Fourth Man"	
1976–77	The Rockford Files	Mike Krasny	Episode: "The Dog and Pony Show"	
1976–77	Charlie's Angels	Bill Duncan	2 episodes	
1977	M*A*S*H	Willie Stratton	Episode: "Souvenirs"	
1978, 1981	Three's Company	Rama Mageesh	Episode: "Chrissy and the Guru"	
1978, 1981	Three's Company	Michael	Episode: "Some of That Jazz"	
1980	Benson	Petrov	Episode: "Checkmate"	
1980–81, 1991	Dallas	Les Crowley	4 episodes	
1980–81, 1991	Dallas	Pat Connors	Episode: "Farewell, My Lovely"	
1985	Remington Steele	Bill Miles	Episode: "Steele in the Chips"	
1986	Scarecrow and Mrs. King	King Edmund Spencer	Episode: "The Boy Who Could Be King"	
1987	Star Trek: The Next Generation	Zorn	Episode: "Encounter at Farpoint"	
1988	Hunter	Major Voss	2 episodes	
1993–94	Star Trek: Deep Space Nine	Borum, Drofo Awa	2 episodes	
1997–98	Earth's Fury (Anatomy of Disaster)	Narrator	Voice	
1999	Bullet Catchers	Narrator	Voice	
1999	Medal of Honor	Narrator	Voice	
1999	Mysteries of Asia	Narrator	Voice	
1999–2002	E! True Hollywood Story	Narrator	Voice	
2004–06	Expeditions to the Edge	Narrator	Voice	
2021	Batwoman	Staffer	3 episodes	
2022	Visitors	Sheriff Kovac	8 episodes Voice	

==== Animation ====
Year	Title	Role	Notes	References
1972	The Houndcats	Stutz	13 episodes	
1972	The ABC Saturday Superstar Movie	Artful Dodger, Fishmonger, Craig Robinson / Tyrano Guard	2 episodes	
1972–73	The New Scooby-Doo Movies	Various voices	4 episodes	
1973	Speed Buggy	Mark	16 episodes	
1977–84	Super Friends	Zan, Gleek, Riddler, Lex Luthor, various voices		
1978	Jana of the Jungle	Ben Cooper	13 episodes	
1978	The Scooby-Doo/Dynomutt Hour	Various voices	4 episodes	
1979	Scooby Goes Hollywood	Jackie Carlson, Jesse Rotten	Television film	
1979	The Plastic Man Comedy/Adventure Show	Plastic Man	Main role	
1980	Captain Caveman and the Teen Angels	Peter	Episode: "The Scarifying Seaweed Secret"	
1981	Space Stars	Space Ace	11 episodes	
1981	The Kwicky Koala Show	George Bungle, Ranger Rangerfield	3 episodes	
1981	Trollkins	Grubb Trollmaine	13 episodes	
1981–89	The Smurfs	Grouchy Smurf, Handy Smurf, Lazy Smurf, Johan, various voices		
1982–83	The Incredible Hulk	Bruce Banner	Main role (13 episodes)	
1983	Rubik, the Amazing Cube	Reynaldo Rodriguez	13 episodes	
1983	Spider-Man and His Amazing Friends	Doctor Octopus	Episode: "Spidey meets the Girl from Tomorrow"	
1983–85	G.I. Joe: A Real American Hero	Blowtorch, Clutch, Duke, Lift-Ticket, Major Bludd, Scrap-Iron, Tollbooth, Xamot	Main role	
1984	Voltron	Lance, Cric, Shannon, Wolo, Madoc, various voices	Main role (122 episodes)	
1984–87	The Transformers	Bombshell, Brainstorm, First Aid, Prowl, Scrapper, Sideswipe, Swoop, Dr. Fujiyama, Possum Brown	54 episodes	
1984–88	Snorks	Allstar Seaworthy, Bigweed	Main role (65 episodes)	
1985–86	Galtar and the Golden Lance	Yogoth	21 episodes	
1985	The Greatest Adventure: Stories from the Bible	Angel of the Lord, Captain, Eliab, Philistine Warrior	2 episodes	
1986–87	Foofur	Harvey	16 episodes	
1986–88	The Flintstone Kids	Mr. Bad	7 episodes	
1986	Inhumanoids	Auger, Blackthorne Shore	8 episodes	
1986	My Little Pony	Grogar	Episode: "The Return of Tambelon"	
1986	Rambo: The Force of Freedom	General Ranjid	Episode: "The Lost City of Acra"	
1987	DuckTales	Talking Onion	Episode: "Duckworth's Revolt"	
1988	Superman	Lex Luthor	7 episodes	
1988	A Pup Named Scooby-Doo	Stinkweed, Boobeard, Boogedy Bones, Manny the Mauler	3 episodes	
1989	The Karate Kid	Additional characters	Episode: "My Brother's Keeper"	
1989	X-Men: Pryde of the X-Men	Cyclops	Television film (pilot)	
1990	Midnight Patrol: Adventures in the Dream Zone	Sebastian	11 episodes	
1990	Tiny Toon Adventures	Batman	Episode: "Hollywood Plucky"	
1990	TaleSpin	Colonel Grogg, Mr. Perry, High Marshall's Wife, Herman Grapple	5 episodes	
1991	Darkwing Duck	Quackerjack	12 episodes	
1991–2004	Rugrats	Chas Finster, Drew Pickles, Grandpa Boris Kropotkin, various voices	Recurring role	
1992	Goof Troop	Dutch Sparkle	Episode: "As Goof Would Have It"	
1993	The Addams Family	Buck	Episode: "No Ifs, Ands, or Butlers"	
1994	Aladdin	Aziz	4 episodes	
1994	SWAT Kats: The Radical Squadron	Captain Grimalkin	Episode: "When Strikes Mutilor"	
1995	What a Cartoon!	Dad	Episode: "Mina and the Count: Interlude with a Vampire"	
1995	Batman: The Animated Series	Airman Captain	Episode: "Showdown"	
1996	Gargoyles	Trooper, Old Man	Episode: "A Bronx Tail"	
1996	Adventures in Odyssey	Nagle	Episode "Someone to Watch Over Me"	
1996	The Incredible Hulk	Zzzax	Episode: "Raw Power"	
1996–97	The Real Adventures of Jonny Quest	Ezekiel Rage, additional voices	6 episodes	
1998–99	Oh Yeah! Cartoons	Officer, Onlooker, Twins	2 episodes	
1998–2000	Voltron: The Third Dimension	Lance, Coran	25 episodes	
1999	The New Woody Woodpecker Show	Toy Shop Owner	Episode: "Pecking Order/Chilly on Ice/Just Say Uncle"	
2001	Harvey Birdman, Attorney at Law	Zan	Episode: "Very Personal Injury"	
2001–02	House of Mouse	Pongo	2 episodes	
2001–02	Lloyd in Space	Douglas' Father	2 episodes	
2002	Justice League	NTSB Inspector	Episode: "Metamorphosis"	
2003–08	All Grown Up!	Chaz Finster, Drew Pickles	Recurring role; 24 episodes	
2004–06	The Batman	Crime Boss 2, Reporter, Guard	2 episodes	
2005–06	W.I.T.C.H.	Crimson, Drake, Mama, Tynar, Althor	7 episodes	
2006	Frisky Dingo	Phillip	3 episodes	
2011	G.I. Joe: Renegades	Duke's Dad (Max Hauser), Guard, Delivery Man	Episode: "Homecoming"	
2011–14	The LeBrons	Additional voices	23 episodes	
2014	Community	Duke	Episode: "G.I. Jeff"	
2015–16	Transformers: Rescue Bots	High Tide, Newsreel Announcer	5 episodes	
2017	Star Wars Rebels	General Jan Dodonna	4 episodes	
2018	Voltron: Legendary Defender	The Archivist	Episode: "Kral Zera"	
2018–20	DuckTales	Quackerjack	2 episodes	
2025	Star Wars: Tales of the Underworld	Gibbs	Episode: "One Good Deed"	

=== Video games ===
Year	Title	Role	Notes	References
1989	Ys I & II	Dark Fact		
1994	Bouncers	Fu, Master Fo, Mick, Tank, Zap		
1998	Baldur's Gate	Galkin, Gate Warden, Nimbul		
1999	Legacy of Kain: Soul Reaver	Melchiah, Raziel		
1999	Sword of the Berserk: Guts' Rage	Guts		
1999	Revenant	Miyamoto, Jhaga, Elahni		
2000	Clifford the Big Red Dog: Thinking Adventures	Traffic People		
2000	Star Wars: Force Commander	General Tyr Taskeen		
2000	Icewind Dale	Larrel		
2000	Baldur's Gate II: Shadows of Amn	Haer'Dalis, Vittorio		
2000	Ground Control: Dark Conspiracy	Wallace Davidson, Units		
2000	Star Trek: Deep Space Nine: The Fallen	Bajoran Man, Obanak		
2001	Emperor: Battle for Dune	Unit Response Voice		
2001	Baldur's Gate II: Throne of Bhaal	Omar Haraad, Vittorio		
2001	Diablo II: Lord of Destruction	The Druid, Nihlathak		
2001	Soul Reaver 2	Raziel		
2001	Star Trek: Armada II	—N/a	Additional voices	
2001	Metal Gear Solid 2: Sons of Liberty	Gurlukovich Soldiers		
2002	Freedom Force	Merlin, Tochi, Super Samurai		
2002	Soldier of Fortune II: Double Helix	Dr. Dimitri Sestrogar		
2002	Eternal Darkness: Sanity's Requiem	Peter Jacob		
2002	Warcraft III: Reign of Chaos	Druids of the Talon, Medivh, Necromancer		
2003	Arc the Lad: Twilight of the Spirits	Diekbeck		
2003	Alter Echo	Echo		
2003	Grand Chase	Dungeon of Monsters		
2003	Call of Duty	Sergeant Pavlov		
2003	Legacy of Kain: Defiance	Raziel		
2003	Ratchet & Clank: Going Commando	Biker #2, Interview Announcer, Mutant Crab, Protopet Announcer, Security System		
2004	Champions of Norrath	Male Dark Elf Shadowknight		
2004	Ninja Gaiden	Muramasa		
2004	Galleon	Calverly, Jabez, Treasurer		
2004	Xenosaga Episode II: Jenseits von Gut und Böse	Patriarch		
2004	Doom 3	Dr. Pierce Rogers		
2004	Shellshock: Nam '67	Howell		
2004	Shark Tale	Additional Tenant Fish		
2004	The Bard's Tale	—N/a	Additional voices	
2004	Ratchet & Clank: Up Your Arsenal	Comic Narrator, Lawrence, Troopers		
2004	Metal Gear Solid 3: Snake Eater	The Fear		
2005	Shadow of Rome	Julius Caesar		
2005	Madagascar	Nick the Camel, Ostrich 1, Frog		
2005	Advent Rising	Enorym Tenspur		
2005	Darkwatch	Cartwright		
2005	Age of Empires III	John Black		
2005	Ratchet: Deadlocked	Lawrence, Vox		
2007	Ninja Gaiden Sigma	Muramasa		
2007	Clive Barker's Jericho	Governor Cassus Vicus		
2007	Lost Odyssey	Sed		
2007	Universe at War: Earth Assault	Sergeant Woolard		
2008	Condemned 2: Bloodshot	Magic Man		
2008	Madagascar: Escape 2 Africa	—N/a	Additional voices	
2009	Ratchet & Clank Future: A Crack in Time	Lawrence		
2010	Alpha Protocol	Alan Parker		
2011	Ratchet & Clank: All 4 One	Lawrence		
2012	World of Warcraft: Mists of Pandaria	Kairozdormu		
2013	Lightning Returns: Final Fantasy XIII	—N/a	Additional voices	
2014	Hearthstone	Medivh		
2015	Heroes of the Storm	Medivh		
2015	Transformers: Devastation	Scrapper, Sideswipe		
2016	World of Warcraft: Legion	Medivh		
2020	Age of Empires III: Definitive Edition	John Black		
2024	Legacy of Kain: Soul Reaver 1 & 2 Remastered	Melchiah, Raziel	Archival audio	
2026	Legacy of Kain: Defiance Remastered	Raziel	Archival audio	
2026	Legacy of Kain: Ascendance	Raziel		

== Crew work ==
=== Voice director ===
- Kidd Video – Casting and voice director
- Peter Pan and the Pirates – Voice director
- The LeBrons
