= GRB Studios =

American film and television production company

GRB Entertainment, Inc.
- Trade name: GRB Studios
- Type: Privately held company
- Industry: Film production; Television production
- Founded: 1986; 40 years ago
- Founder: Gary R. Benz; Michael Branton
- Headquarters: Sherman Oaks, California, United States
- Area served: Worldwide
- Key people: Gary R. Benz (CEO)
- Products: Motion pictures; Television programs
- Divisions: Aardvark Post; GRB Media Ranch (joint venture with Media Ranch)
- Subsidiaries: Sequoia Entertainment
- Website: www.grbtv.com

GRB Entertainment, Inc. (doing business as GRB Studios since October 9, 2018) is an American film and television production and distribution company, known for producing and distributing reality and documentary programs such as Intervention and Untold Stories of the ER for cable television networks around the world such as Discovery Channel, TLC, Paramount Network, A&E, Travel Channel, The Weather Channel, National Geographic and Animal Planet.

The company is headquartered in Sherman Oaks, California and was founded in 1986 by Gary R. Benz and Michael Branton. Most of GRB's shows were copyrighted under its wholly owned subsidiary, Sequoia Entertainment. The company also distributes reality and documentary shows from third-party production companies internationally.

== History ==
The company was founded in 1986 by Gary R. Benz and Michael Branton.

In 1997, the company formed GRB Home Entertainment to distribute the company's television programs for home video release and signed a distribution deal with Image Entertainment (the largest distributor of LaserDiscs, now known as RLJE Films) on March 3, 1998.

On May 13, 1999, German publishing company Axel Springer SE acquired 51% majority stake in the company, but was later divested in 2002.

In May 2012, the company established a film division.

On August 30, 2023, GRB Studios and Media Ranch announced that they merge their distribution arms to form GRB Media Ranch, a joint venture between the two companies, that distribute programs and formats from both companies, while the two companies continue to operate their production arms.

== Television programs ==
Title	Years	Network	Notes
Stuntmasters	1991–1992	Syndication	co-distributed by Blair Entertainment and All American Television
Movie Magic	1993–1997	Discovery Channel	co-production with Vision Films
World of Wonder	1995–2000	Discovery Channel	
Sea Tek	1996–1997	TLC	
Earth's Fury	1997–1998	TLC	also known as Anatomy of Disaster outside the United States.
Blast Masters: The Science of Explosion	1997	TLC	also known as Kaboom! outside the United States.
Without Warning	1997–1998	TLC	co-production with Associated Press Television News for its second and third seasons, also known as What Went Wrong? outside the United States
The World's Wildest Daredevils	1998	The Family Channel	
Storm Warning!	1997–2001	Discovery Channel	
Mega Movie Magic	1997–2004	Discovery Kids	
AXN: Action TV	1998	Fox Family Channel	co-production with Columbia TriStar International Television
Inferno	1999	Discovery Channel; Life Network Canada	
Ultimate Special Effects	1999	TLC	
Caught on Tape	1999	Various	
Animals are People Too!	1999	Pax TV	International distribution only
Extreme Contact	1999–2001	Animal Planet	
Impact TV!	1999–2000	Various	
Disaster Detectives	2000	TLC	International distribution only, produced by Michael Hoff Productions
High Seas Rescue	2000-2001	Discovery Channel Canada; TLC	co-production with Great North Communications
Anatomy of Crime	2000-2002	Court TV	International distribution only, produced by Langley Productions
Beyond Human Limits	2001	Discovery Channel	
Cannonball Run 2001	2001	USA Network	
Now See This	2002–2003	Discovery Channel	
Outdoor Outtakes	2002	Outdoor Life Network	
Cinema Secrets	2002	AMC	
Travel Scams and Rip-Offs Revealed	2002	Travel Channel	
When Fun Turns to Fear	2002	TLC	
Mysterious Worlds	2002–2004	Various	
Next Action Star	2004	NBC	co-production with NBC Studios, Silver Pictures Television and Warner Bros. Television
Untold Stories of the E.R.	2004–2020	TLC	
Reconcilable Differences	2004	Discovery Health Channel	
Expeditions to the Edge	2004–2006	National Geographic Channel	
Growing Up Gotti	2004–2006	A&E	
Intervention	2005–present	A&E	
The Princes of Malibu	2005	Fox	
Super Swank	2005	Travel Channel	
Invasion Iowa	2005	Spike TV	
Tuckerville	2005	TLC	
Full Force Nature	2006–2011	The Weather Channel	
The Secret Life of a Soccer Mom	2006	TLC	
Flight Attendant School	2006	Travel Channel	
Wild World of Spike	2007	Spike	
The Agency	2007	VH1	
Designer to the Stars	2007	We TV	
Bone Detective	2007	Discovery Channel	
Diagnosis X	2007	TLC	
Alter-Eco	2008	Planet Green	
The Secret Life of a Soccer Mom	2008	TLC	
Wicked Attraction	2008-2013	Investigation Discovery	International distribution only, produced by M2 Pictures
Aftermath with William Shatner	2010–2011	The Biography Channel	
Confessions: Animal Hoarding	2010–2012	Animal Planet	
Auction Kings	2010-2013	Discovery Channel	International distribution only, produced by Authentatic Entertainment
Hurricane Hunters	2012	The Weather Channel	International distribution only
Pregnant and Dating	2012-2013	We TV	
Fugitivos De La Ley Los Angeles	2013	Mun2	
Sex Sent Me to the ER	2013-2016	TLC	
Scambushed	2014	Travel Channel	
Showdown of the Unbeatables	2014–2015	National Geographic	
#RedFlag	2015	HLN	
Digital Addiction	2019	A&E	
It's a Dog's Life with Bill Farmer	2020	Disney+	-
LA Firestorm: Inside the Inferno	2026	Reelz	

== Television films, miniseries and specials ==
- The Ultimate Stuntman: A Tribute to Dar Robinson (1987)
- The World's Greatest Stunts (1988)
- Live! The World's Greatest Stunts (1990)
- Masters of Illusion: The Wizards of Special Effects (1994)
- Aliens Invade Hollywood (1997)
- Medal of Honor (1999)
- War Dogs (1999)
- Climb Against the Odds (1999)
- On the Inside: The Real Ghosthunters (1999)
- Rangers: Cops in the Woods (2000)
- Stuntmen's World Tour (2000)
- Terror in the Tracks (2001)
- Extreme Driving Quiz (2001)
- In Pursuit of the Wild (2001)
- Highway Pirates (2001)
- Stigmata: Divine Blood (2001)
- Bet Your Life (2004)
- True Caribbean Pirates (2006)
