= Untold Stories of the E.R. =

American docudrama television series

- Directed by: Paul Benz; Tim Prokop
- Country of origin: United States
- No. of seasons: 14
- No. of episodes: 157

Production
- Executive producers: Gary R. Benz; Michael Branton; Elizabeth Browde; John Drimmer; Daniel Helfgott; Susan Winston; Tammy Wood; Tim Prokop; Bob Niemack
- Running time: 40-50 mins.
- Production company: GRB Entertainment

Original release
- Network: TLC (2004–2018, 2026-present); Discovery Health Channel (2005–2010); Discovery Life (2011–2020)
- Release: April 12, 2004

Untold Stories of the E.R. is an American docudrama television series which airs on TLC and Discovery Life. It features real-life emergency department doctors discussing their most bizarre and puzzling cases. Typically these involve unusual incidents, unorthodox or surprising injuries and ailments, violent or strange behavior from patients, life-threatening injuries, medical sabotage, or situations in which the E.R. physician is too overwhelmed or unequipped to handle the caseload but cannot transfer responsibility of the patient to a dedicated professional.

The show follows a docudrama format in which the real-life E.R. physician narrates through a series of "talking head" clips, while their interactions with the patient are reenacted. The doctors often play themselves, and whenever possible, the patients themselves take part in the reenactment as well. In addition, the patients are sometimes shown in brief interviews to explain what happened during their ordeal. Occasionally, patients' names are changed, and actors play their roles. All cases are based on actual events but may have the surrounding circumstances changed for the sake of dramatization and may not necessarily be accurate from a clinical or technical standpoint.

Untold Stories of the E.R. premiered on April 12, 2004. On November 11, 2015, the show was renewed through season 11, and began its 13th season in 2020. After a six-year hiatus due to the COVID-19 pandemic, the show returned for its 14th season, which began on October 14, 2026.

== Production ==
While the show's format originally focused on one story per episode, since 2010 each episode covers three separate cases. The Discovery Health airings moved to Discovery Fit & Health (now Discovery Life) when Oprah Winfrey Network replaced Discovery Health in January 2011; however, as of February 2011, select reruns are also appearing in OWN's daytime lineup. Current episodes are now aired on Discovery Life and TLC.

As of 2024, the program are made available for streaming online on Discovery+ (thirteenth, fourteenth and fifteenth seasons only), The Roku Channel (the first nine seasons are under license from FilmRise, the thirteenth, fourteenth and fifteenth seasons are provided via Discovery+), Pluto TV (for Brazil, Denmark, Norway, the United Kingdom and Latin America, the first nine seasons were formerly available in the U.S. until the 2024 acquisition of the show's streaming rights by FilmRise), Tubi (The first, second, third, fourth, seventh and ninth seasons only, dubbed in Spanish and later added the sixth and eighth seasons in English audio, provided by FilmRise), Prime Video (The first nine seasons were later added in 2024 due to FilmRise's acquisition of streaming rights, the thirteenth, fourteenth and fifteenth seasons are provided via Discovery+), Vix (the first nine seasons only, dubbed in Spanish under the title Salas de Emergencias: Historias ineditas) and Vudu.

In January 2024, New York City-based streaming service and film distributor FilmRise announced that it would acquire the streaming rights to the show's first nine seasons in English-speaking countries from GRB Media Ranch, making the first nine seasons of the series are available for streaming online on The Roku Channel, Tubi and Amazon Prime Video.

== Untold Stories of the ER: Extra Dose ==
Untold Stories of the ER: Extra Dose is a spin off that takes normal episodes of the series and does a Pop-Up Video-esque take on them by featuring pop up facts about diseases, medication, etc.

== Episodes ==
#	Airdate	Title
1	4/12/2004	"My Job Is Mayhem""
2	4/26/2004	"The Big Save"
3	6/21/2004	"We Have A Heartbeat"
4	4/4/2005	"No Time to Think"
5	4/11/2005	"Red Blanket"
6	4/18/2005	"A Scary Feeling"
7	4/25/2005	"A Day From Hell"
8	5/2/2005	"Prepare For the Worst"
9	5/9/2005	"No Down Time"
10	5/16/2005	"We Need A Miracle"
11	5/23/2005	"I Need Some Help Here"
12	5/30/2005	"How Can This Happen"
13	6/6/2005	"Call the Code"
14	6/13/2005	"What A Day"
15	6/20/2005	"Nothing's Working"
16	6/27/2005	"We Need Further Tests"
17	7/4/2005	"Pressure Is Building"
18	7/11/2005	"Surgery Won't Help"
19	10/24/2005	"Say Your Prayers"
20	10/31/2005	"A Life In Their Hands"
21	11/7/2005	"Code Green in the E.R."
22	11/28/2005	"Exorcism In the E.R."
23	12/5/2005	"The Golden Hour"
24	12/12/2005	"Toilet Paper Eating Patient"
25	12/19/2005	"Long Live the King"
26	1/9/2006	"Coma Woman Surprise"
27	1/16/2006	"'Til Death Do Us Part"
28	1/23/2006	"Mystery of the Traveling Bullet"
29	1/30/2005	"An E.R. Miracle"
30	2/6/2006	"A Real Pain In the Neck"
31	2/27/2006	"From E.R. to Rushing River"
32	6/14/2006	"Jaws of Life"
33	6/21/2006	"Code Green In the E.R." (duplicate entry)
34	6/28/2006	"Mountain Lion Attack"
35	7/5/2006	"Shot Through the Heart"
36	7/13/2006	"Hidden Dangers"
37	7/20/2006	"Deadly Diagnosis"
38	7/27/2006	"Code Black"
39	8/2/2006	"Life and Limb"
40	9/18/2006	"Hiccup Hiccup"
41	9/27/2006	"Liver Die"
42	10/4/2006	"Elements of Danger"
43	10/11/2006	"Deadly Impact"
44	10/18/2006	"Crushed"
45	11/1/2006	"Under Siege"
46	11/8/2006	"Hooked Alive"
47	11/8/2006	"Family Tragedy"
48	11/15/2006	"Officer Down"
49	11/29/2006	"Too Close to Home"
50	12/13/2006	"Director Down"
51	12/20/2006	"A Shot In the Dark"
52	12/27/2006	"Baby Blues"
53	4/19/2008	"Mountain Lion Attack" (duplicate entry)
54	11/6/2010	"Heart in Hand"
55	11/10/2010	"Life and Limb Too"
56	11/17/2010	"Ice Cold Mom"
57	11/24/2010	"Grandma's Back"
58	12/1/2010	"Short Circuited Heart"
59	12/8/2010	"Minutes to Live"
60	12/15/2010	"Man With Two Faces"
61	12/22/2010	"Death Breath"
62	01/07/2012	"Pipe in Head"
63	01/14/2012	"Campstove Stuffing"
64	01/21/2012	"Radioactive Rocks"
65	01/28/2012	"Stabbed in the Heart"
66	02/04/2012	"Halloween in the E.R."
67	02/11/2012	"Rottweiler in the E.R."
68	02/18/2012	"Girlfriend, Wife, Stroke!"
69	02/25/2012	"Never Say Die"
70	10/20/2012	"Frat Boy Blues"
71	10/27/2012	"I Can't Remember"
72	11/03/2012	"Bridesmaid Meltdown"
73	11/10/2012	"Delusional Bride"
74	11/17/2012	"Deadly Sore Throat"
75	11/24/2012	"Crowbar in Head"
76	12/01/2012	"Holiday in E.R."
77	12/08/2012	"My Head's Exploding"
78	12/15/2012	"Diagnose Me!"
79	10/6/2013	"Cows & Stillettos"
80	10/13/2013	"Escaping Diagnosis"
81	10/26/2013	"Cowboy Chaos"
82	10/27/2013	"Belly Dancer Mystery"
83	11/3/2013	"When It Rains"
84	11/8/2013	"Chocolate Pudding"
85	11/15/2013	"Rattled"
86	11/29/2013	"Headaches & Zombies"
87	12/6/2013	"Twists & Turns"
88?	12/20/2013	"Dumpster Smash"
89	12/13/2013	"Deep Trouble"
90	7/11/2014	"Turtle Trouble"
91	7/18/2014	"Skewered Skydivers"
92	7/25/2014	"Dr. Epi"
93	7/31/2014	"I Hate Doctors"
94	8/8/2014	"Shredded!"
95	8/15/2014	"Why Am I blue?"
96	8/22/2014	"Drama Mama"
97	8/29/2014	"Clueless!"
98	11/14/2014	"Don't Touch That!"
99	11/21/2014	"Dr. Bikini"
100	11/28/2014	"Don't Push It!"
101	12/5/2014	"Plastered!"
102	12/12/2014	"Punched!"
103	12/26/2014	"Over-Juiced"
104	1/2/2015	"Cop-Shocker"
105	1/9/2015	"Out of Control"
106	1/15/2015	"Drunk & Drunker"
107	2/28/2015	"Twist & Shout"
108	6/21/2015	"Party Fails"
109	6/28/2015	"Worst Day Ever"
110	12/4/2015	"Oh, Deer!"
111	6/21/2015	"Celebration Stoppers"
112	6/28/2015	"Didn't See It Coming"
113	12/11/2015	"Zombie Uprising"
114	12/18/2015	"Size Matters"
115	1/1/2016	"Shocking!"
116	1/8/2016	"Medieval Mayhem"
117	1/15/2016	"Face Off"
118	1/22/2016	"Beyond Recognition"
119	1/29/2016	"Who Shot Who?"
120	2/5/2016	"I'm So Dead"
121	2/12/2016	"Perform Storm"
122	2/19/2016	"Back From the Dead"
