= Earth's Fury =

American documentary television series

- Also known as: Anatomy of Disaster (outside the United States)
- Genre: Documentary
- Written by: Various
- Narrated by: Michael Bell
- Theme music composer: Deon Vozov
- Composers: Jeffrey Gould; Christopher Rife
- Country of origin: United States
- Original language: English
- No. of seasons: 2
- No. of episodes: 13

Production
- Executive producer: Gary R. Benz
- Producer: Kathleen Phelan
- Running time: 40-50 minutes
- Production company: GRB Entertainment

Original release
- Network: The Learning Channel
- Release: February 24, 1997 – November 17, 1998

Related
- Anatomy of a Disaster

Earth's Fury (also known as Anatomy of Disaster outside the United States) is an American documentary television series that ran on The Learning Channel from February 24, 1997, to November 17, 1998.

Produced by GRB Entertainment, each episode examines natural disasters and the science of the natural phenomena such as earthquakes, forest fires, tornadoes, hailstorms, hurricanes, typhoons, volcanic eruptions, floods and landslides.

All episodes of the series are narrated by voice actor Michael Bell.

== Episodes ==
=== Series overview ===
Season	Episodes	Originally released	
Season	Episodes	First released	Last released
1	7	February 24, 1997	May 1, 1997
2	6	September 29, 1998	November 17, 1998

=== Season 1 (1997) ===
No. overall	No. in season	Title	Original release date	Prod. code
1	1	"Firestorms"	February 24, 1997	101
Examine wildfires. Wildfires featured in this episode include the Yellowstone fires of 1988, Oakland firestorm of 1991, 1993 Malibu, California wildfire, 1961 Bel-Air fire and Storm King Mountain (1994) wildfires.
2	2	"Superstorms"	February 26, 1997	102
Examines storms caused by supercell thunderstorms include tornadoes, microburst, lightning and hailstorms, Storms featured in this episode include the 1991 Andover, Kansas tornado, 1990 Denver hailstorm, 1995 Pampa, Texas tornado, Cass County, Minnesota tornado in 1991 and the crash of the Delta Air Lines Flight 191.
3	3	"Earthquake!"	February 25, 1997	103
Examines earthquakes, earthquakes featured in this episode include the 1985 Mexico City earthquake, 1906 San Francisco earthquake, 1995 Kobe earthquake, 1990 Luzon earthquake, 1994 Northridge earthquake, 1989 Loma Prieta earthquake and 1976 Tangshan earthquake.
4	4	"Volcano"	April 30, 1997	104
Examines volcanoes and lahars, volcanic eruptions covered in this episode include the 1991 eruption of Mount Pinatubo, 1980 eruption of Mount St. Helens, 1973 Eldfell eruption in Iceland, Armero tragedy in Colombia, eruptions of Kīlauea and Mauna Loa in Hawaii.
5	5	"Urban Infernos"	April 28, 1997	105
Examines structure fires, oil spills and fires caused by riots, fires featured in this episode include the Happy Land fire, Cocoanut Grove fire, Paxton Hotel fire in Chicago, Texas City explosion, Kuwaiti oil fires during the Gulf War and fires during the 1992 Los Angeles riots
6	6	"Hurricane Force"	April 29, 1997	106
Examines tropical cyclones (called hurricanes and typhoons), tropical cyclones featured in this episode include Hurricane Hugo, Hurricane Andrew, Hurricane Fran, Hurricane Camille, the 1900 Galveston hurricane, Hurricane Iniki and the 1970 Bhola cyclone.
7	7	"Flood Path"	May 1, 1997	107
Examines floods and flash floods, floods covered in this episode include the Great Flood of 1993, the collapse of the Teton Dam in Idaho in 1976, 1996-97 Western United States floods, 1996 Quebec floods and floods in the Guadalupe River in 1987.

=== Season 2 (1998) ===
No. overall	No. in season	Title	Original release date	Prod. code
8	1	"El Niño: Climate Chaos"	November 16, 1998	201
El Niño explained, and the 1997-98 El Niño event and the 1982–83 El Niño event featured.
9	2	"Slide!"	October 2, 1998	202
Examines landslides and avalanches,
10	3	"Raging Rivers"	November 17, 1998	203
Examines flash floods for the second time, which included the 1997 Fort Collins flood
11	4	"Super Fire"	September 29, 1998	204
Examines wildfires for the second time.
12	5	"Ferocious Oceans"	September 30, 1998	205
Examines ship sinking caused by rogue waves.
13	6	"Colliding Continents"	October 1, 1998	206
Explains magma eruptions of Mount Etna, Mount Ruapehu, 1997 Umbria and Marche earthquake and lahars from Mount Pinatubo in Bacolor, Pampanga.

== Broadcast history ==
The show was first shown on The Learning Channel in the United States from February 24, 1997, until November 17, 1998.

In 1997, GRB pre-sold the show to Nine Network in Australia., followed by ITV and UK Horizons in the United Kingdom, RTL in Germany, Antena 3 in Spain, ATV in Hong Kong, Fuji TV in Japan, Televisa in Mexico (via Canal 5), and Groupe ASP in France.

Some episodes of the show was shown in reruns on The Weather Channel (via the Storm Week series of television specials about weather phenomena, the Earthquake! episode was later shown as an episode of Storm Stories in 2006) in 2005 and the Fox Reality Channel in the United States from 2008 until 2009.

In Europe, the show was shown on Reality TV (now known as CBS Reality) from 2001 until 2005.

== International versions ==
On August 22, 2010, a version of the show titled Anatomy of a Disaster that is hosted by actor Richard Gutierrez, began airing on GMA Network, a Philippine television channel and lasted until November 6, 2011.

== Streaming release ==
As of 2026, the show is made available for streaming online on video-on demand streaming services that partnered with Radial Entertainment's FilmRise (GRB's current digital distributor) including Amazon Prime Video, Fawesome, Pluto TV (both with an original English version provided by FilmRise in the United States and in Latin America with a Spanish dub), The Roku Channel, Vix (also dubbed in Spanish under the title Anatomia del Desastre) and Tubi (replaced with a version provided by FilmRise, who acquired the digital distribution rights to several GRB Studios shows, but in the correct original 4:3 standard-definition aspect ratio with the show's closing credits omitted in favor of the GRB Studios and FilmRise production logos, starting in May 2023.)

On December 20, 2016, GRB Entertainment launched a channel dedicated to the show and posted its thirteen episodes on YouTube, but the aspect ratio on the YouTube releases of the first season of the show is in letterboxed version.
