= Bill Farmer =

American voice actor (born 1952)

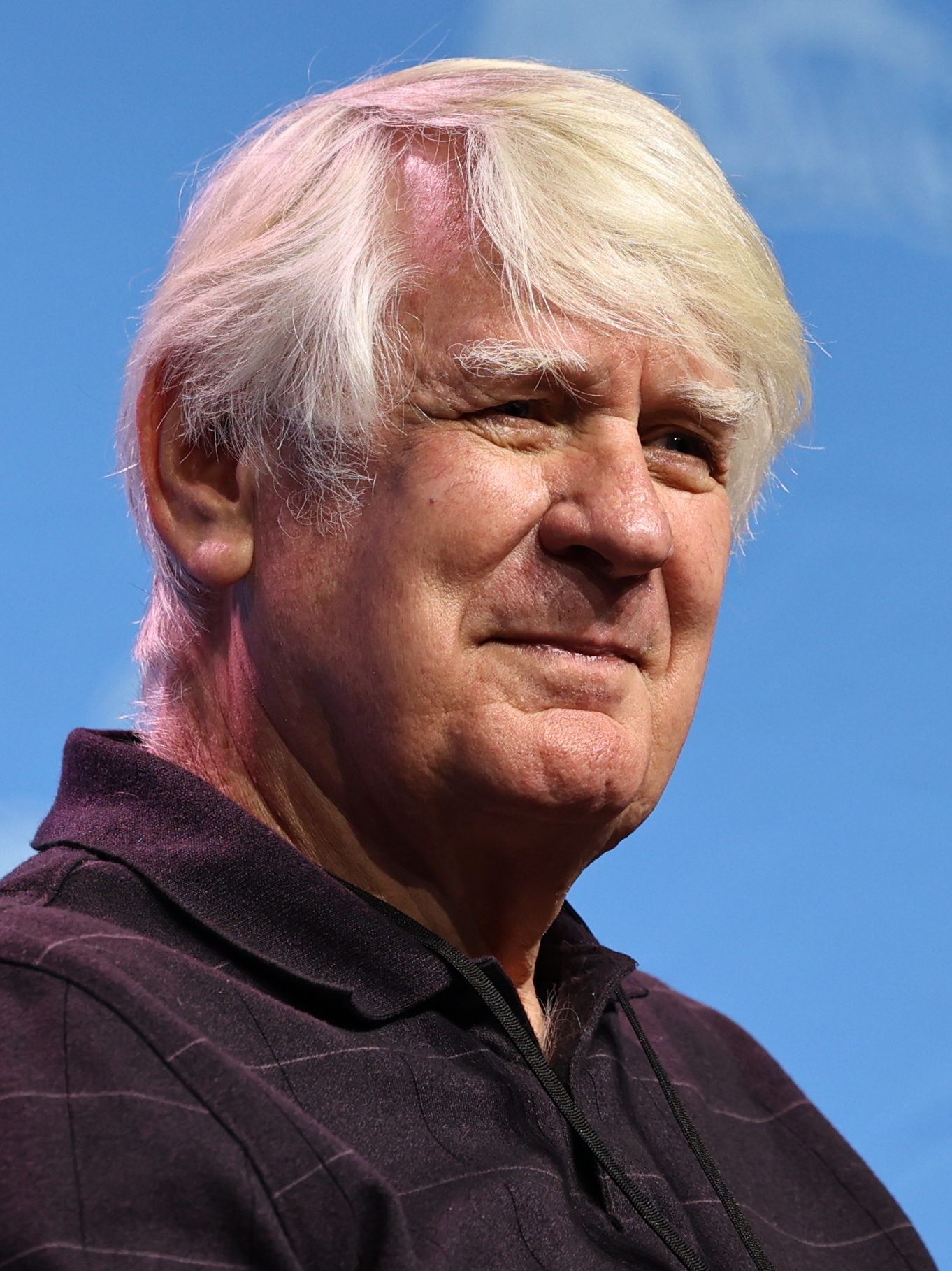
- Farmer at GalaxyCon Columbus in 2023
- Born: November 14, 1952 (age 74); Pratt, Kansas, U.S.
- Education: University of Kansas
- Occupations: Voice actor; comedian; impressionist
- Years active: 1975–present
- Agent: AVO Talent
- Spouse: Jennifer Wynne (m. 1984)
- Children: 1

Bill Farmer (born November 14, 1952) is an American voice actor, comedian and impressionist. He has performed the voice of the Disney character Goofy since 1987, and has also been the voice of Pluto and Horace Horsecollar since 1990. In a career spanning five decades, he has over 300 voice acting credits across more than 200 titles.

== Early life ==
Farmer was born on November 14, 1952, in Pratt, Kansas, the second child in his family. His parents were of English and Welsh descent.

Farmer began doing voices at the age of 10, involved doing impressions, especially those of Western stars like John Wayne or Walter Brennan. He and his friends would sometimes go through fast food drive-thrus and order foods in his character voices. Farmer graduated from the University of Kansas in 1975, where he became a member of the Sigma Chi Fraternity. In university, he found work in radio and TV and then moved on to stand-up comedy as an impressionist. In 1982, while he was still doing stand-up comedy, Farmer worked at a comedy club called the Comedy Corner in Dallas, Texas. He continued to work there until his move to Hollywood in 1986.

His decision to move to California came from a Dallas commercial agent who suggested that, given his talent for voices, he should try his luck in California. He was recently married, but he and his wife talked it over and came to an arrangement. She stayed back in Dallas while he commuted for a year after he got an apartment. Then four months after his moving out to Hollywood, his agent asked him if he could do any Disney characters.

Farmer asserts that voice acting is not about funny voices, but about acting. His mentor was the versatile voice actor Daws Butler, the man behind many of Hanna-Barbera's characters. He taught Farmer that when doing cartoon voices, a person is not merely doing a funny voice, but they are an actor and the acting is premier and that one has to think like the character one is performing.

== Career ==
In 1986, he got a call from his agent about an open audition for the Disney character Goofy. When he auditioned for the role, he studied the way the original actor Pinto Colvig performed as Goofy in the classic cartoons. He studied the hilarious laugh and the distinctive "gawrsh". After auditioning for the role, he inherited the voice of Goofy in January 1987 (and also Pluto in 1990). He originated the voice of Horace Horsecollar in Disney's version of The Prince and the Pauper and has played him ever since as well. Farmer also performed additional voices on The New Adventures of Mighty Mouse (1987) and Astro Boy (2004). In 1987, Farmer had a small part as reporter Justin Ballard-Watkins in the film RoboCop.

Other significant characters he has played include Sylvester the Cat, Scooby-Doo and Beetlejuice in ABC Family Fun Fair, an annual stage show that toured malls in the late 1980s; and Yosemite Sam, Sylvester and Foghorn Leghorn in the film Space Jam (1996). He has also done several guest voices, both on TV, including The Grim Adventures of Billy & Mandy and in video games, including the Destroy All Humans! series, Namco's Tales of Symphonia, where he voiced Governor-General Dorr; Detective Date in the SEGA game Yakuza, Captain Wedgewood and Frill Lizard in Ty the Tasmanian Tiger, many voices on EverQuest II, Cletus Samson, Floyd Sanders, Jeff Meyers and Ryan LaRosa in the video game Dead Rising, and Sam and others in the cult classic adventure game Sam & Max Hit the Road. Farmer has also played Secret Squirrel on Harvey Birdman, Attorney at Law in both the animated series and its spin-off video game, Stinkie in Casper: A Spirited Beginning and Casper Meets Wendy, Stanley in Beauty and the Beast, male cats in Cats Don't Dance, male ants in A Bug's Life, Male Soldier #1 in The Iron Giant, Man #1 in Toy Story 2, a photographer in Monsters, Inc., Edgar in Brother Bear, Oliver Sansweet's lawyer in The Incredibles, Willie Bear in Horton Hears a Who!, Sam the Bus Driver in The Grinch, Mr. Leghorn in Loonatics Unleashed, and Bugs Bunny and Daffy Duck in Robot Chicken. From 2014 to 2016, he played Doc, the leader of the title characters in Disney's animated television series The 7D. He also voiced Blackhoof Boar Clan Leader in the 2008 video game Kung Fu Panda. Farmer still regularly performs comedy routines at the Laugh Factory. He voiced the character Hopediah "Hop Pop" Plantar on Disney's Amphibia from 2019 to 2022. In 2020, Farmer hosted the live-action television show It's a Dog's Life with Bill Farmer on Disney+.

== Recognition ==
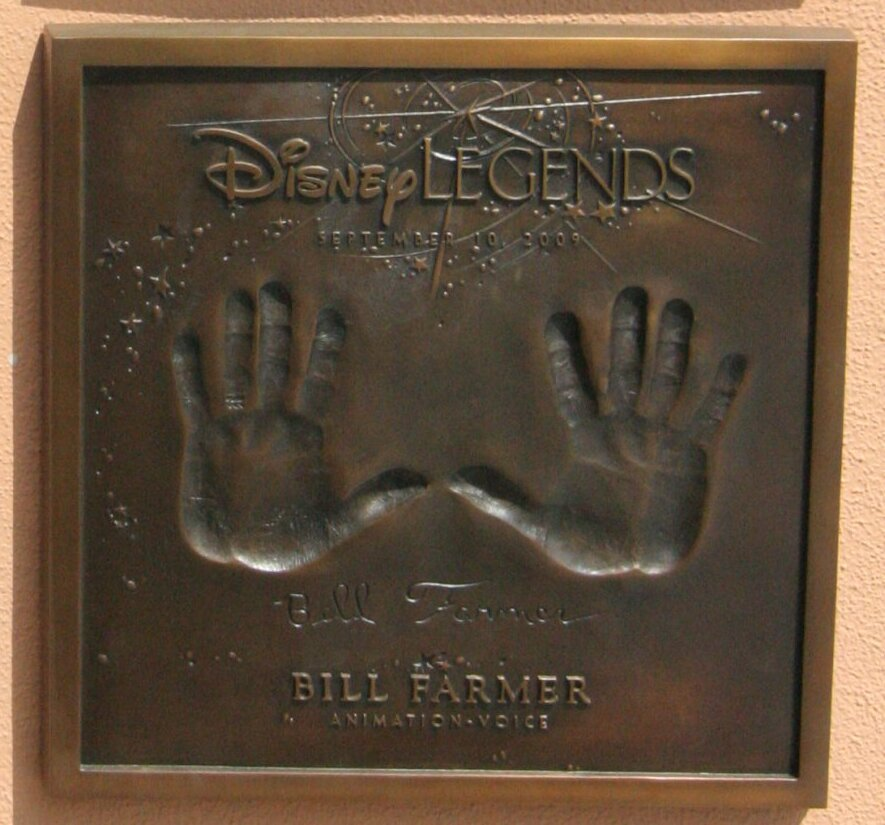
Bill Farmer Disney Legends plaque at Walt Disney Studios in Burbank, California

In September 2009, Farmer was named a Disney Legend. In 2011, the International Family Film Festival awarded Bill Farmer the 'Friz Award' for Animation.

He won the Annie Award for Voice Acting in an Animated TV/Broadcast Production for his work as Goofy and Grandma Goofy in Mickey Mouse.

== Personal life ==
Farmer married his wife, Jennifer Wynne, on June 2, 1984. Together they have one son, Austin (b. 1989), who works as a sound engineer and freelance drummer.

== Filmography ==
=== Film ===
List of voice performances in feature films
Year	Title	Role	Notes
1988	Who Framed Roger Rabbit	Koko the Clown, Goofy (singing voice, uncredited)	Role shared with Tony Pope
1990	The Prince and the Pauper	Goofy, Pluto, Horace Horsecollar, Weasels #1	
1991	Rover Dangerfield	Farm voices	
1991	Beauty and the Beast	Stanley	Provides the "gulp, gulp, gulp" sound of Gaston swallowing eggs.
1995	Theodore Rex	Additional voices	
1995	A Goofy Movie	Goofy	
1995	Runaway Brain	Pluto	Short film
1995	Toy Story	Monotone Announcer	
1996	Space Jam	Foghorn Leghorn, Sylvester, Yosemite Sam	Role of Foghorn shared with Greg Burson
1996	The Hunchback of Notre Dame	Frollo's Soldiers	
1997	Cats Don't Dance	Male Cat #3	
1997	Hercules	Male Builder #1	
1998	A Bug's Life	Male Ant #3	
1999	The Iron Giant	Male Soldier #1	
1999	Toy Story 2	Man #1	
2001	Monsters, Inc.	CDA, Photographer	
2003	Brother Bear	Edgar	
2004	Home on the Range	Donkey	
2004	Shrek 2	King Harold's Guards	ADR group
2005	Son of the Mask	Masked Otis	Role shared with Richard Horvitz
2006	Ice Age: The Meltdown	Male Elk	
2006	Cars	Winford Bradford Rutherford, Lee Revkins, Ryan Shields	
2007	Happily N'Ever After	Additional voices	
2007	Surf's Up	Male Penguin	
2008	Horton Hears a Who!	Willie Bear	
2012	The Lorax	Thneedville Man #3, Street Sweeper	
2013	Monsters University	Professor Brandywine, Jason Chiang	
2015	Minions	Additional voices	
2016	The Secret Life of Pets	Additional voices	
2016	Sing	Bob the News Reporter Dog	
2017	Despicable Me 3	Additional voices	
2018	The Grinch	Sam the Bus Driver	
2020	Phineas and Ferb the Movie: Candace Against the Universe	Hermellivue	
2021	Seal Team	Seal	
2023	Once Upon a Studio	Goofy, Pluto	Short film
2023	Four Souls of Coyote	Duck/Racoon	
2026	Hexed	Ol' Whiskers	

List of voice performances in direct-to-video and television films
Year	Title	Role	Notes
1990	Disney Sing-Along-Songs: Disneyland Fun	Goofy, Pluto	
1993	Disney Sing-Along-Songs: The Twelve Days of Christmas	Goofy	
1994–95	Mickey's Fun Songs series	Goofy, Pluto	
1997	Casper: A Spirited Beginning	Stinkie	
1998	Casper Meets Wendy	Stinkie	
1998	The Spirit of Mickey	Goofy	
1999	Mickey's Once Upon a Christmas	Goofy, Pluto	
2000	An Extremely Goofy Movie	Goofy	Nominated - Outstanding Voice Acting by a Male Performer in an Animated Feature Production
2001	Mickey's Magical Christmas: Snowed in at the House of Mouse	Goofy, Pluto, Practical Pig	
2001	The Wacky Adventures of Ronald McDonald	Knight #2, Mob Leader	Episode 5
2002	Cinderella II: Dreams Come True	King's Guards	
2002	Mickey's House of Villains	Goofy, Pluto	
2004	The Lion King 1½	Goofy, Sleepy	Cameo
2004	Mickey, Donald, Goofy: The Three Musketeers	Goofy, Pluto	
2004	Mickey's Twice Upon a Christmas	Goofy, Pluto	

=== Animation ===
List of voice performances in television shows
Year	Title	Role	Notes
1987	D-TV Doggone Valantine	Goofy	Television film; first production as Goofy
1987	D-TV Monster Hits	Goofy	Television film
1988	Mighty Mouse: The New Adventures	Additional voices	6 episodes
1989	Goofy About Health	Goofy	
1989	Betty Boop's Hollywood Mystery	Fergie Furbelow	
1989	Goody Field Trips	Goofy	Episode: "Planes"
1990	Goofy's Guide to Success	Goofy	Television film
1992	Raw Toonage	Goofy	1 episode
1992	Goof Troop Christmas	Goofy	Television film
1992	Mickey's Nutcracker	Goofy, Pluto	Uncredited; Television special
1992–93	Goof Troop	Goofy	Main cast
1992–93	Wild West C.O.W.-Boys of Moo Mesa	Puma	4 episodes
1993	Bonkers	Goofy	3 episodes
1995	What-a-Mess	Additional voices	
1996	Quack Pack	Pluto	2 episodes
1998	Paracycling	Goofy	
1999	Disney's Mouseworks Spaceship	Pluto	
1999–2000	Mickey Mouse Works	Goofy, Pluto, Horace Horsecollar	Main cast
2001–03	House of Mouse	Goofy, Pluto, Horace Horsecollar, Practical Pig, Sheriff of Nottingham	Main cast
2003–04	Totally Spies!	President	Uncredited; 2 episodes
2003–06	The Grim Adventures of Billy & Mandy	Stank Williams, Blort Sportscaster	3 episodes
2004	Game Over	Race Announcer	Episode: "Meet the Smashenburns"
2004–05	Harvey Birdman, Attorney at Law	Secret Squirrel	2 episodes
2005	Loonatics Unleashed	Sportscaster, Mr. Leghorn	Episode: "Stop the World I Want to Get Off"
2006–16	Mickey Mouse Clubhouse	Goofy, Pluto	Main cast
2006–16	Robot Chicken	Bugs Bunny, Daffy Duck, Coach, Pubertis, Retired Navy Ship Commander	4 episodes
2006	The Adventures of Jimmy Neutron: Boy Genius	Warden Buford Lee Stormstrucker	Episode: "Who Framed Jimmy Neutron?"
2006	Ergo Proxy	Al (English dub)	Episode: "Shoujo Smile: Eternal Smile"
2007	Higglytown Heroes	Janitor Jay	Episode: "The Big Pink Elephant/Higglies on Horseback
2008–2013	The Garfield Show	Additional voices	5 episodes
2010	Jonah Hex: Motion Comics	Additional voices	7 episodes
2011–2016	Minnie's Bow-Toons	Goofy, Pluto, additional voices	40 episodes
2013	Wheel of Fortune	Goofy, Pluto	Episodes: "Making Disney Memories Week 1, Making Disney Memories Week 2"
2013–2019	Mickey Mouse	Goofy, Pluto	Main cast
2014–16	The 7D	Doc, Sir Yips-A-Lot	Main cast
2015	Jake and the Never Land Pirates	Ghostly Bob	2 episodes
2016	Duck the Halls: A Mickey Mouse Christmas Special	Goofy	Television special
2017	The Scariest Story Ever: A Mickey Mouse Halloween Spooktacular	Goofy	Television special
2017–2021	Mickey Mouse Mixed-Up Adventures	Goofy, Pluto, Horace Horsecoller, Mayor McBeagle, Mr. Bigby, Uncle Goofy, Additional voices	Main cast
2019	The Tom and Jerry Show	Irish Spike, Irish Butch	Episode: "Double Dog Trouble"
2019–2022	Amphibia	Hopediah "Hop Pop" Plantar	Main cast
2019	Vampirina	Larry Moss	Episode: "Bat Got Your Tongue/Haunted Theater"
2020	DuckTales	Goofy	Episode: "Quack Pack!"
2020–2023	The Wonderful World of Mickey Mouse	Goofy	Main cast
2021–2025	Mickey Mouse Funhouse	Goofy, Pluto, Horace Horsecollar	Main cast
2021–2024	Chip 'n' Dale: Park Life	Pluto	Main cast
2021	How to Stay at Home	Goofy	Main cast
2022	We Baby Bears	Lord Billy Willy	Episode: "Happy Bouncy Fun Town"
2022, 2026	Chibiverse	Hopediah "Hop Pop" Plantar	4 episodes
2022	Dead End: Paranormal Park	Chester Phoenix	Episode: "The Other Side"
2023	Dew Drop Diaries	Wilford the Dog	
2025–present	Mickey Mouse Clubhouse+	Goofy, Pluto	Main cast

=== Anime ===
List of dubbing performances in anime
Year	Title	Role	Notes
2003	Porco Rosso	Additional voices	English dub
2004	Astro Boy	Dr. Tawashi	Main cast

=== Video games ===
List of voice performances in video games
Year	Title	Role	Notes
1993	Sam and Max Hit the Road	Sam, Psychic, Flambe	
1994	Quest for Glory IV: Shadows of Darkness	Leshy	
1995	Full Throttle	Horrace, Corley Motors Merchandise Salesman, Gas Guard Pilot, News Anchorman	
1996	Mortimer and the Riddles of the Medallion	Bald Eagle, Coyote, Desert Gate, Gila Monster	
1998	Disney's Hades Challenge	Goofy	
1998	King's Quest VIII: Mask of Eternity	King Gryph, Weirdling Tradesman	
1998	Baldur's Gate	Brunos, Irlentree, Yeslick Orothiar	
2000	Mickey's Speedway USA	Goofy	
2000	Looney Tunes Racing	Foghorn Leghorn	
2000	Looney Tunes: Space Race	Foghorn Leghorn	
2000	Mickey Mouse Kindergarten	Goofy, Pluto, Bellhop #1, Bellhop #2	
2000	Mickey Mouse Preschool	Goofy, Pluto, Gas Attendant	
2000	The Flintstones: Bedrock Bowling	Bamm-Bamm Rubble, Dino Bridge	
2000	The Emperor's New Groove	Villager	
2001	Disney Learning: Phonics Quest	Goofy, Horace Horsecollar	
2001	Goofy's Fun House	Goofy	
2002	Ty the Tasmanian Tiger	Wedgwood the Pirate, The Frill Necked Lizard	
2002	Kingdom Hearts	Goofy, Pluto	
2002	Disney Golf	Goofy	
2002	Disney Sports Soccer	Goofy	
2002	Disney Sports Skateboarding	Goofy	
2002	Disney Sports Football	Goofy	
2002	Disney Sports Basketball	Goofy	
2003	Disney's Party	Goofy	
2003	Toontown Online	Goofy	
2003	Command & Conquer: Generals	Comanche, Tomahawk Launcher	
2003	Tales of Symphonia	Governor-General Dorr	
2004	Champions of Norrath: Realms of EverQuest	Additional voices	
2004	Ty the Tasmanian Tiger 2	Parrotbeard, Squeaver, Johno	
2004	EverQuest II	Various characters	
2005	Destroy All Humans!	Narrator, Rural Male	
2005	Crash Tag Team Racing	Old Man, Park Drones	
2005	Ty the Tasmanian Tiger 3: Night of the Quinkan	Parrotbeard	
2006	Over the Hedge	Lou, Rottweiler	
2006	Cars	Rustbucket Cars	
2006	Dead Rising	Cletus Samson, Floyd Sanders, Jeff Meyers, Ryan LaRosa	
2006	Kingdom Hearts II	Goofy, Pluto	
2006	Scooby-Doo! Who's Watching Who?	Ghost of Elias Kingston, Sylvester Sweetsugar, Farmer Burt Harrison, Captain Quint	
2006	Yakuza	Makoto Date	English dub
2006	Flushed Away	Spike	
2006	Nicktoons: Battle for Volcano Island	Old Hermit Crab, Plant King, Crab Refugee #4, Plant Guard	
2007	Meet the Robinsons	Ice Cream Vendor	
2008	Harvey Birdman: Attorney at Law	Secret Squirrel, Cameraman, Prison Guard #2	
2008	Destroy All Humans! Big Willy Unleashed	Colonel Kluckin	
2008	Kung Fu Panda	Blackhoof Boar Clan Leader	
2008	Disney Think Fast	Goofy, Horace Horsecollar	
2008	Destroy All Humans! Path of the Furon	Legg Tallman, Deep Navel	
2008	Looney Tunes: Cartoon Conductor	Foghorn Leghorn, Mouse	
2008	Kingdom Hearts Re: Chain of Memories	Goofy	
2009	Kingdom Hearts 358/2 Days	Goofy	
2010	Epic Mickey	Goofy, Horace Horsecollar	
2010	Kingdom Hearts Birth by Sleep	Goofy, Horace Horsecollar, Sleepy	
2011	Kinect Disneyland Adventures	Goofy, Pluto	
2012	Epic Mickey 2: The Power of Two	Goofy, Horace Horsecollar, Practical Pig	
2012	Epic Mickey: Power of Illusion	Goofy	
2012	Kingdom Hearts 3D: Dream Drop Distance	Goofy	
2013	Kingdom Hearts HD 1.5 Remix	Goofy, Pluto	Archive audio
2014	Disney Magical World	Goofy, Pluto, Sleepy	
2014	Kingdom Hearts HD 2.5 Remix	Goofy, Horace Horsecollar, Sleepy	Archive audio
2017	Kingdom Hearts HD 2.8 Final Chapter Prologue	Goofy	Archive audio
2019	Kingdom Hearts III	Goofy	
2020	Yakuza: Like a Dragon	Makoto Date	English dub
2020	Kingdom Hearts: Melody of Memory	Goofy	
2022	Disney Dreamlight Valley	Goofy	
2023	Disney Illusion Island	Goofy	
2023	Disney Speedstorm	Goofy	
2024	Like a Dragon: Infinite Wealth	Makoto Date	English dub
2024	Epic Mickey: Rebrushed	Goofy, Horace Horsecollar	Archive audio
2026	Yakuza Kiwami 3 & Dark Ties	Makoto Date	English dub

=== Theme park attractions ===
Year	Title	Role	Source
1989	Great Movie Ride	Cowardly Lion	
2003	Mickey's PhilharMagic	Goofy	
2020	Mickey & Minnie's Runaway Railway	Goofy, Pluto	

=== Live-action ===
List of acting performances in feature films, short films and television shows
Year	Title	Role	Notes	Source
1987	RoboCop	Justin Ballard-Watkins		
1991	Murphy Brown	George H. W. Bush (voice)	Episode: "Hoarse Play"	
1992	Death Becomes Her	—N/a	ADR loop group	
1997	Troops	Announcer (voice)	Short Film	
1998	Pumpkin Man	Father Goblin / Billy Bob Sr.		
1999	Men in Scoring Position	Smiling Jack		
2000	Bob's Video	Sheriff Harmon		
2004	Boomerang	—N/a	Editor	
2010	I Want Your Money	George H. W. Bush, George W. Bush (voices)		
2010	'Til Death	George W. Bush, Minister (voices)	Episode: "The Wedding"	
2013	I Know That Voice	Himself	Documentary	
2015	With Lee in Virginia	—N/a	Cinematographer	
2017	Generational Sins	Sheriff Randall		
2020	It's a Dog's Life with Bill Farmer	Himself (host)	9 episodes	

=== Web ===
List of acting performances in web shows
Year	Title	Role	Notes
2017	The UnPop Podshow	Phil Gardender	Episode: "Podfellas"
2021	A Goofy Movie but it's the REAL voice actors - Lester's Possum Park	Goofy	

== Awards and nominations ==
Awards and nominations
Year	Award	Category	Title	Result
2000	Annie Awards	Outstanding Voice Acting by a Male Performer in an Animated Feature Production	An Extremely Goofy Movie	Nominated
2009	Disney Legend Award	Animation - Voice		Won
2011	Daytime Emmy Award	Outstanding Performer in an Animated Program	Mickey Mouse Clubhouse	Nominated
2012	Behind the Voice Actors Video Game Voice Acting Award	Best Vocal Ensemble in a Video Game	Epic Mickey 2: The Power of Two	Nominated
2014	Annie Awards	Outstanding Character Voice-Over Performance	Mickey Mouse	Nominated
2015	Behind the Voice Actors Television Voice Acting Award	Best Vocal Ensemble in a New Television Series	The 7D	Won
2015	Behind the Voice Actors Television Voice Acting Award	Best Male Vocal Performance in a Television Series - Children's/Educational	Mickey Mouse Clubhouse	Nominated
2015	Annie Awards	Outstanding Achievement in Voice Acting in an Animated TV/Broadcast Production	Mickey Mouse	Won
2016	Behind the Voice Actors Television Voice Acting Award	Best Vocal Ensemble in a New Television Series	The 7D	Won

Preceded by Tony Pope	Voice of Goofy; 1987–present	Succeeded by current voice
Preceded by Pinto Colvig	Voice of Pluto; 1990–present	Succeeded by current voice
Preceded by Billy Bletcher	Voice of Horace Horsecollar; 1990–present	Succeeded by current voice
Preceded by Jim Cummings	Voice of Yosemite Sam; 1996	Succeeded by Frank Gorshin
