= The Houndcats =

- Created by: Joe Ruby & Ken Spears
- Voices of: Michael Bell; Joe Besser; Daws Butler; Stu Gilliam; Arte Johnson; Aldo Ray; Joan Gerber; Bob Holt; John Stephenson
- Country of origin: United States
- No. of episodes: 13

Production
- Producers: Friz Freleng; David H. DePatie
- Running time: 22 minutes (per episode)
- Production company: DePatie–Freleng Enterprises

Original release
- Network: NBC
- Release: September 9 – December 2, 1972

The Houndcats is an American Saturday morning cartoon series produced by DePatie–Freleng Enterprises. The series was broadcast by NBC from September 9 to December 2, 1972, with reruns continuing until September 1, 1973. Thirteen episodes were produced.

== Plot ==
Loosely based on the CBS adventure series Mission: Impossible and the short-lived 1971 series Bearcats!, the series was headed by a combined team of (three) dogs and (two) cats, hence the name, undertaking spy missions in 1914 America.

Each episode begins with the Houndcats receiving orders from their unseen "Chief", whose message is played on an old-fashioned gramophone, player-piano or other devices, parodying the tape recorder scene at the start of most episodes of Mission: Impossible. However, the words "this message will self-destruct in five seconds" always take the Houndcats by surprise, causing them to run away from the explosion.

== Members ==
- The "Houndcats" are led by cool and confident cat Stutz.
- Dingdog is Stutz' right-hand man. He wore a blue Civil War uniform. He was known for bad timing and bad judgment. He is a Briard.
- Mussel Mutt is the muscle – large, bulky and ever-hungry, his eyes were almost always hidden under his hat. He is an Old English Sheepdog.
- Putty Puss is a cat and a disguise expert.
- Rhubarb is a dog and a scientist. He wore a long coat and a large sombrero usually revealing only his nose. His coat was full of gadgets.

== Cast ==
- Michael Bell as Stutz, the Raven
- Joe Besser as Putty Puss
- Daws Butler as Rhubarb and the Chief (three episodes), Dr. Strangeless, Grogan
- Stu Gilliam as Dingdog
- Arte Johnson as Rhubarb, the Chief, Captain Blight
- Aldo Ray as Mussel Mutt
- Joan Gerber as Madame X
- Bob Holt
- John Stephenson as Doctor Doll, Dr. Greenhouse

== Production ==
13 half-hour episodes of the series were produced. An adult laugh track was added, as was common practice for cartoon series at the time.

== Episodes ==
| No. | Title | Original release date |
|---|---|---|
| 1 | "The Misbehavin' Raven Mission" | September 9, 1972 |
| 2 | "The Double Dealing Diamond Mission" | September 16, 1972 |
| 3 | "The Great Gold Train Mission" | September 23, 1972 |
| 4 | "The Over the Waves Mission" | September 30, 1972 |
| 5 | "There's No Biz Like Snow Biz Mission" | October 7, 1972 |
| 6 | "The Strangeless Than Fiction Mission" | October 14, 1972 |
| 7 | "The Ruckus on the Rails Mission" | October 21, 1972 |
| 8 | "The Who's Who That's Who Mission" | October 28, 1972 |
| 9 | "The Perilous, Possibly, Pilfered Plans Mission" | November 4, 1972 |
| 10 | "The French Collection Mission" | November 11, 1972 |
| 11 | "The Outta Sight Blight Mission" | November 18, 1972 |
| 12 | "Is There a Doctor in the Greenhouse Mission" | November 25, 1972 |
| 13 | "The Call Me Madame X Mission" | December 2, 1972 |

== Home media ==
In October 2015, Film Chest Media Group released The Barkleys and The Houndcats - 2 DVD Classic Animation Set on DVD in Region 1. This collection features all 13 episodes of the series on DVD.

== Syndication ==
The show was previously syndicated by Viacom International, which is now CBS Television Distribution (later known as CBS Media Ventures).

== Staff ==
- Created for Television by David H. DePatie, Friz Freleng
- In Association with Ken Spears, Joe Ruby
- Writers: Woody Kling, Tom Dagenais, Don Christensen
- Animation Director: Bob McKimson
- Storyboard Directors: Gerry Chiniquy, Arthur Leonardi, Cullen Houghtaling, Paul Sommer
- Layout Supervisor and Design: Robert Taylor
- Layouts: Martin Strudler, Marty Murphy, Bob Givens, Tony Rivera, Pete Alvarado
- Animation: Don Williams, Manny Gould, Ken Muse, Norm McCabe, Bob Richardson, Warren Batchelder, John Gibbs, Jim Davis, Bob Matz, Bob Bransford, Reuben Timmins, Bob Bemiller
- Background Supervised by Richard H. Thomas, Mary O'Loughlin
- Film Editing Supervised by Lee Gunther
- Film Editors: Joe Siracusa, Roger Donley, Allan R. Potter, Rick Steward
- Voice Talents of Michael Bell, Joe Besser, Daws Butler, Stu Gilliam, Arte Johnson, Aldo Ray and Joan Gerber, Bob Holt, John Stephenson
- Title Designs by Arthur Leonardi
- Music by Doug Goodwin
- Music Score Conducted by Eric Rogers
- Music Recording Engineer: Eric A. Tomlinson
- Executive in Charge of Production: Stan Paperny
- Production Supervisor: Harry Love
- Camera: Ray Lee, Larry Hogan, John Burton, Jr.
- Production Mixer: Steve Orr
- Sound by Producer's Sound Service, Inc.
- Associate Producers: Joe Ruby, Ken Spears
- Produced by David H. DePatie, Friz Freleng

== In other languages ==
- Arabic: فرقة المطاردة
- Bulgarian: Котараци-хрътки
- Basque: Ehizakatuak
- French: Les Chacabots
- Hebrew: הכלבתולים
- Italian: Gli investigatti, La valle dei gatti
- Japanese: それゆけ珍探偵ハウンドキャッツ
- Korean: 골목대장 똘이
- Polish: Gończe koty
- Portuguese: Missão Quase Impossível
- Russian: Ищейки
