= Hyatt Terraces Baguio Hotel =

Former hotel in Baguio, Philippines

Hyatt Terraces Plaza Baguio
- The Terraces Plaza (1978) before it was rebranded into a Hyatt Brand
- Former names: The Terraces Plaza
- Hotel chain: Hyatt Hotels Corporation

General information
- Status: Destroyed
- Architectural style: Brutalist
- Location: Baguio, Philippines, 8 South Dr, Camp John Hay, 2600
- Coordinates: 16°24′26″N 120°36′29″E
- Opening: September 1976
- Destroyed: July 16, 1990; 36 years ago
- Owner: Hyatt Hotels Corporation

Height
- Height: 44.51 m (146.0 ft)

Technical details
- Floor count: 12

Design and construction
- Architects: Arcenas Payumo Dee Andrews (APDA) Architects, Ruben Payumo

Other information
- Number of rooms: 303 (regular rooms); 220 (deluxe rooms)
- Number of suites: 90 (exclusive suites); 4 (duplex penthouses)
- Number of restaurants: 3
- Number of bars: 3

The Hyatt Terraces Baguio, opened in September 1976 as the Terraces Plaza Hotel, was a 12-storey hotel located along South Drive in Baguio, Philippines. It was the only five-star international hotel outside the National Capital Region during its time until the hotel was destroyed during the 1990 Luzon earthquake.

== History and architecture ==
The Terraces Plaza Hotel was built during the Philippines' "hotel boom," opening in time for the World Bank-International Monetary Fund 1976 meeting of the Board of Governors, held in Manila.

The architecture of Hyatt Terraces Plaza was characterized by a unique stepped design, with terraced levels cascading down, taking inspiration from the Banaue Rice Terraces in Ifugao. The Terraces wing also featured a wide open atrium, with lush plants cascading down. This design not only provided panoramic views of the surrounding mountains and city, but also integrated the hotel seamlessly into the hilly terrain.

General Manager Heinrich Maulbecker of Hyatt Bangkok was tasked in 1978 to study the viability of converting the hotel to a Hyatt. Hyatt assumed management in 1979 and the hotel was rebranded as Hyatt Terraces Baguio. Maulbecker became the general manager of the Baguio hotel until the destruction of the hotel during the 1990 Luzon earthquake.

It sustained the most serious damage among buildings in Baguio, with the hotel's terraced front wing collapsing and falling into the lobby area which caused the deaths of at least 80 people, including 50 guests and 30 employees. The site of the hotel was subsequently vacated and fenced off.

== Facilities ==
The hotel had three restaurants including a coffee shop: The Kaili Cafe, The Copper Gill, and the Hanazono Japanese Buffet. The hotel also had three bars: The Fireplace Bar, Gold Mine Disco Bar and The Kaili Bar located near the casino. In addition, the hotel had a casino, located at the other side of the atrium lobby, a swimming pool, Jacuzzi, golf club, and a spa.

== Gallery ==
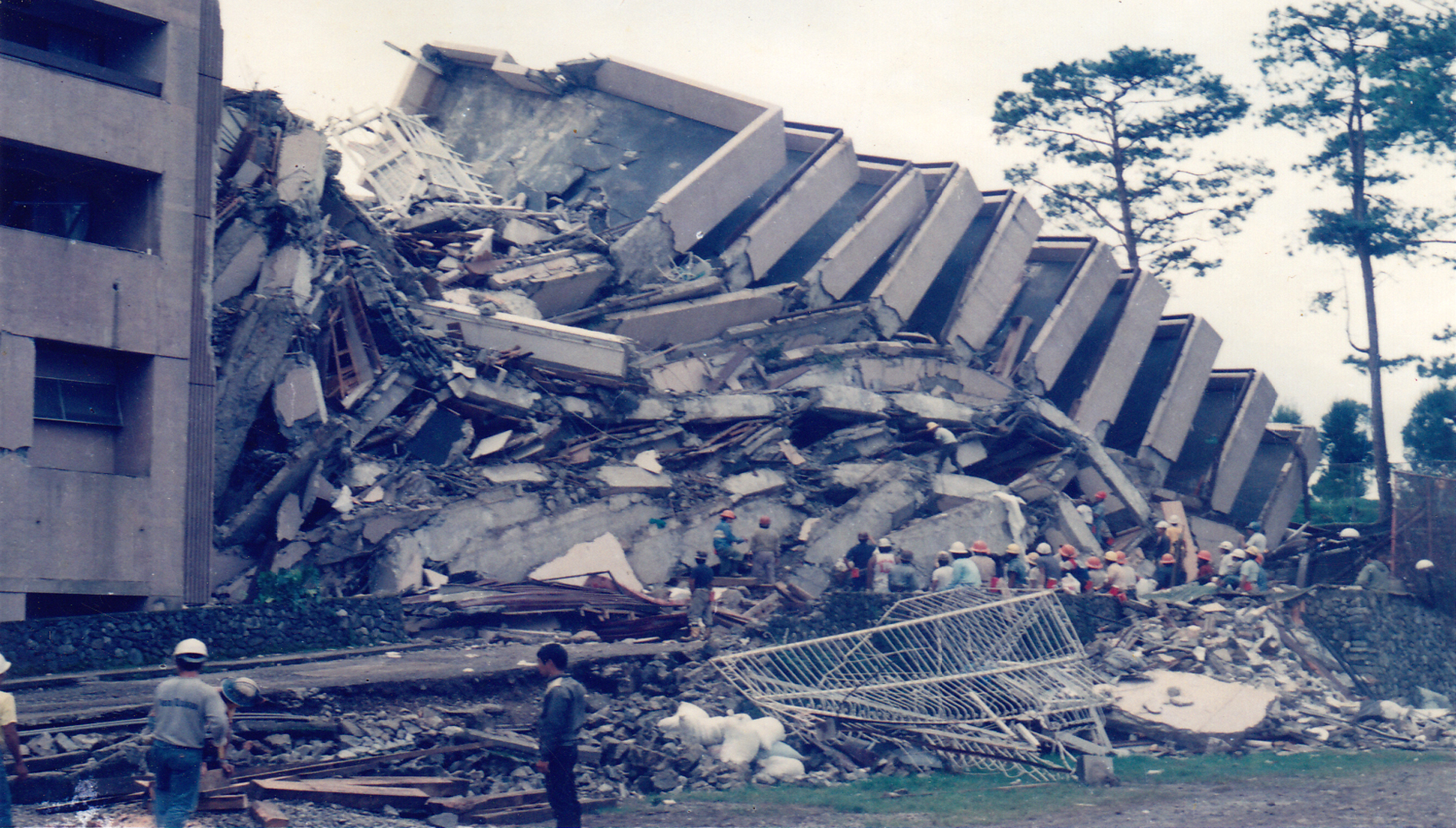
The collapsed Hyatt Terraces Baguio Hotel, after the earthquake

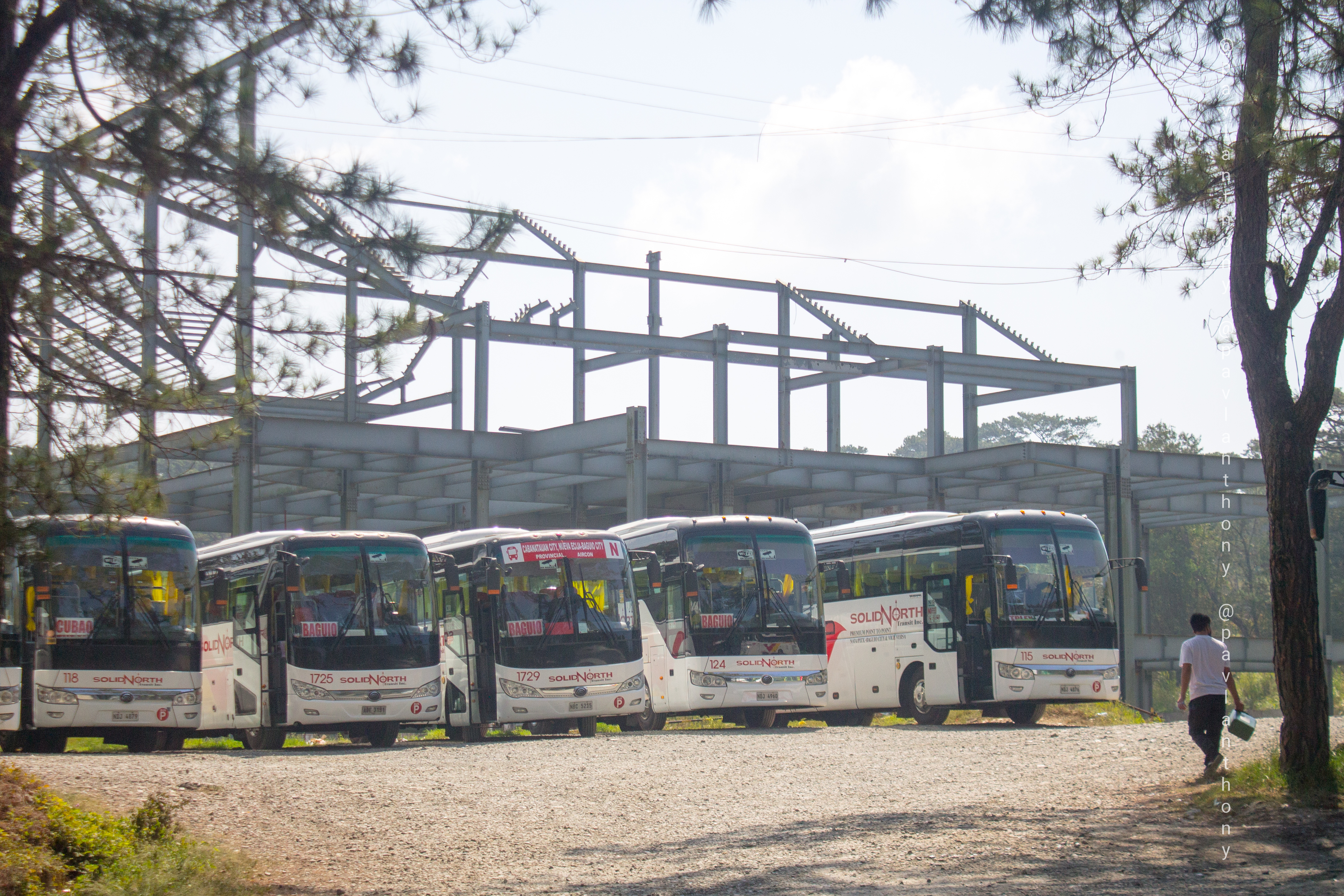
Undemolished steel frames from the side part of Hyatt Terraces in April 2026.
