= It's a Dog's Life with Bill Farmer =

American documentary television series

- Genre: Documentary
- Created by: Bill Farmer
- Country of origin: United States
- Original language: English
- No. of seasons: 1
- No. of episodes: 10

Production
- Executive producers: Bill Farmer; Jennifer Farmer; Steve Duval; Gary R. Benz; Phil Kruener
- Production companies: Dog Tale Productions, Inc. GRB Studios

Original release
- Network: Disney+
- Release: May 15 – July 17, 2020

It's a Dog's Life with Bill Farmer is an American documentary television series hosted by Bill Farmer. The series premiered on Disney+ on May 15, 2020. It was removed from the service in May 2023.

== Background ==
Farmer developed the concept after shooting footage at an equestrian facility that housed a large dog population. After originally considering pitching the concept to networks such as Animal Planet and PBS, a Disney executive suggested Farmer pitch it in-house. Filmmaker Don Hahn assisted with the pitch, and ten episodes were subsequently ordered for the Disney+ streaming service.

== Premise ==
The series follows Bill Farmer, the voice actor for Goofy and Pluto of the Mickey Mouse franchise, as he showcases working dogs and their jobs. Each episode profiles two working dogs and feature interstitial segments starring Goofy and Pluto.

== Episodes ==
No.	Title	Original release date
1	"Whale Poop Dogs & Sheep Herding Dogs"	May 15, 2020
Bill meets a dog who sniffs for whale poop in Puget Sound. He then meets dogs who work to herd sheep at a ranch.
2	"Dogs & Cheetahs & Companion Dogs"	May 22, 2020
Bill meets a companion dog to a cheetah at the Cincinnati Zoo. He then meets another helpful companion dog.
3	"Mascot Dogs & Guide Dogs for Runners"	May 29, 2020
Bill meets Texas A&M's mascot, Reveille. He then meets a guide dog for a runner in New York City.
4	"Disaster Rescue Dogs & A Dog Mayor"	June 5, 2020
Bill meets dogs who rescue people in disasters. He then meets a dog who is the mayor of her town.
5	"The Surfing Corgi & Bee Dogs"	June 12, 2020
Bill meets a surfing corgi. Then, he visits dogs whose noses help bees survive.
6	"Stunt Dogs & Water Rescue Dogs"	June 19, 2020
Bill meets a troupe of performing stunt dogs. He then visits a team of water rescue dogs.
7	"Detective Dogs & Truffle Hunting Dogs"	June 26, 2020
Bill meets dogs who find lost pets. Then, he visits a truffle-hunting dog.
8	"Movie Star Dogs & Hounds and Horses"	July 3, 2020
Bill meets a dog who stars in movies. Then, he visits a group of hound dogs and horses on the hunt.
9	"Avalanche Rescue Dogs & The Beagle Brigade"	July 10, 2020
Bill meets a dog who rescues people in avalanches. Then, he meets a group of luggage-sniffing beagles.
10	"Hawaiian Conservation Dogs & Snake Search Dogs"	July 17, 2020
Bill meets two dogs who protect birds in Hawaii. Then, he visits a group of snake-sniffing dogs.
