= Full Force Nature =

American documentary television series

- Genre: Documentary
- Narrated by: Bill Ratner
- Country of origin: United States
- Original language: English
- No. of episodes: 12

Production
- Executive producer: Gary R. Benz
- Running time: 30 minutes
- Production company: GRB Entertainment

Original release
- Network: The Weather Channel
- Release: January 15, 2006 – 2011

Full Force Nature is an American documentary television series that is narrated by Bill Ratner and ran on The Weather Channel from January 15, 2006 until 2011.

== Premise ==
Full Force Nature focuses on extreme weather and weird weather events that are caught on video camera.

== Episode list ==
=== Season 1 ===
No.	Title
1	"California Flooded River"
2	"Elk City, Oklahoma, Tornado"
3	"Hurricane (Katrina charley Claudette)"
4	"Iowa Tornado"
5	"Katrina Boat and Fire"
6	"Katrina Gulfport Hotel Surge"
7	"Kitty Hawk, North Carolina, Hurricane"
8	"LA Rains Rescue"
9	"Sea Storm"
10	"Texas Flash Floods"
11	"Tornado (Illinois, Salt Lake City, and Kansas)"
12	"Vegas 2 (Monsoonal Rains of Las Vegas)"

== Home media and streaming releases ==
On April 28, 2009, Echo Bridge Home Entertainment (under license from GRB Entertainment) released the show on DVD in Region 1.

On January 25, 2010, Echo Bridge Home Entertainment (under license from GRB Entertainment) released both volumes of Full Force Nature on DVD in Region 1.

On December 20, 2016, GRB Entertainment made the show available for streaming on YouTube.

In 2018, the series was available online on the streaming services Netflix and Tubi, but the show was later removed on Netflix in 2019 and Tubi in 2020, but it returned to the latter service in July 2023, when FilmRise acquired digital distribution rights to the show, along with other shows from GRB Studios.

As of 2023, the show is currently available for streaming online on FilmRise's app and its partners, The Roku Channel, Tubi and Amazon Prime Video and its sister AVOD service, Amazon Freevee in English audio, and dubbed in Spanish on Pluto TV in Latin America and Vix in the United States and Mexico, under the titles Fuerza Total de la Naturaleza and Naturaleza Impacable.

In August 2024, the first season of Full Force Nature was made available on Pluto TV in English audio.

DVD name	Ep #	Release date
Full Force Nature	12	April 28, 2009
Full Force Nature: Volume 1	6	January 25, 2010
Full Force Nature: Volume 2	6	January 25, 2010

== International versions ==
The Philippine version of the show was hosted by actor Richard Gutierrez, and aired on GMA Network under the "Bilib Ka Ba? Nights" (lit. 'Do You Believe? Nights') block of the network from December 2, 2008 until February 17, 2009.

== See also ==
- Deadline to Disaster - a similar documentary television show that aired on The Weather Channel since 2020.
