= Mega Movie Magic =

American children's television series

- Genre: Documentary
- Created by: Gary R. Benz
- Narrated by: Cam Clarke
- Theme music composer: Scott Lloyd Shelly
- Composer: Scott Lloyd Shelly
- Country of origin: United States
- Original language: English
- No. of seasons: 7

Production
- Executive producer: Gary R. Benz
- Running time: 22 minutes
- Production company: GRB Entertainment

Original release
- Network: Discovery Channel, Discovery Kids
- Release: 1998 – 2004

Mega Movie Magic is an American television program that was shown on Discovery Channel as part of its Sunday morning children-targeted line-up. The program explored special effects used in films. It was produced by GRB Entertainment. The program was nominated for a CableAce Award in 1998, and "drew healthy ratings" in its first season. It began in 1998 as the children's version of Discovery Channel's 1994–97 program, Movie Magic, and was shown during 2004.
