= Super Swank =

- Directed by: Tim Prokop; Christian Robinson

Production
- Executive producer: Tammy Wood

Original release
- Network: Travel Channel

Super Swank is a Travel Channel series that portrayed luxurious lifestyles and destinations. The show features mega-yachts, RV motor mansions, outrageous hotel suites, and luxury vacation homes.

The series was Executive Produced by Tammy Wood for GRB Entertainment and Elizabeth Browde for Travel. It was directed by Tim Prokop and Christian Robinson. The producers were Tim Prokop, Lisa Pollack-Fox and Kellianne Wilder. Yoram Astrakhan was the director of photography.
