= The LeBrons =

Fictitious family of American basketball player LeBron James

The LeBrons are a mock family of American basketball player LeBron James's that was featured in commercials for Nike's line of James's shoes. The four members of the family each represent an aspect of James's personality that compete for control over him. The commercials consist of two "seasons", each like a miniature TV show episode.

The LeBrons is an animated web series from NBA player LeBron James. Based on the series of Nike commercials of the same name, The LeBrons launched on YouTube in April 2011. The original animated series, produced by Believe Entertainment Group and Spring Hill Productions, with various logo cameos of HP, Intel, Sprite, and Beats by Dr. Dre features a first season of 10 original episodes that are released once a week over the course of 10 weeks. Week-to-week production of the series was led by Matthew Giongo. Under his direction, The LeBrons was once in the process of being pitched to Cartoon Network, in order to become a full-length series.

== Characters ==
=== Family ===
LeBron James plays all of the characters in The LeBrons.

- Wise – The old sage that keeps LeBron grounded. Often makes references to his own basketball prowess, claiming to have performed a quadruple double in the state championship.
- Business – A slick business/ladies man. Often too busy talking on his cell phone to participate in other activities.
- Athlete – The basketball player.
- Kid – A play on LeBron's youth compared to other NBA players, he is a youngster just looking to have fun.

=== Others ===
- Erik (voiced by Adam McArthur)

== Seasons (commercials) ==
=== Season one ===
- Behind the Scenes
- Lion
- Butter
- Glory Days
- New Shoes

== Web series ==
The LeBrons is told through the point of view of KID who is surrounded by the other LeBron characters: "Wise", "Business", and "athlete". A modern-day Fat Albert, "The LeBrons" is a family entertainment show designed to relay a series of "positive life messages" to youth and young adults in every episode, through outrageous storylines and flawed, but relatable characters. The show tackles subjects like teamwork, family, friendship, staying in school, the importance of helping others, being trustworthy, always trying to be your best, staying out of trouble, and more.

The show takes place in Akron, Ohio, LeBron's hometown. The animated "Akron" in "The LeBrons" draws inspiration and a striking resemblance to its real life counterpart. It depicts LeBron's real life stomping grounds including his neighborhood, community pool, rec center, school, and more.

The LeBrons debuted on YouTube and can also be found through LeBron's Facebook and Twitter channels, and a dedicated section of LeBronJames.com. The series is syndicated through Digital Broadcasting Group (DBG). HP and Intel are the lead technology sponsors.

A portion of the proceeds from the series will be used for the purchase of HP computers powered by Intel Core processors, to be donated to Boys & Girls Clubs of America in support of its education initiatives.

=== Season two ===
- EP 1. "Camping Trip Pt. 1"
- EP 2. "Camping Trip Pt. 2"
- EP 3. "Hall Pass"
- EP 4. "Wise for Mayor"
- EP 5. "Driver's Ed"
- EP 6. "Election Day"

== Songs ==
- "Summer Madness" by Kool & The Gang is played during Swimming Pool.
