= Deadline to Disaster =

- Genre: Documentary
- Country of origin: United States
- Original language: English
- No. of seasons: 3
- No. of episodes: 22

Production
- Production company: Weather Group

Original release
- Network: The Weather Channel
- Release: May 3, 2020 – December 24, 2022

Deadline to Disaster is a documentary program on The Weather Channel that premiered on May 3, 2020. In this series, eyewitnesses capture the full fury of extreme weather on camera. (e.g. tornadoes, hurricanes, flash floods) The third season premiered on November 19, 2022. It is unknown if new episodes will be released.

== Episodes ==
=== Season 1 ===
No. overall	No. in season	Title	Original release date
1	1	"Capital Catastrophe"	May 3, 2020
Unseasonably warm weather in Canada triggers six tornadoes in a matter of hours, including an EF3 tornado that tears through a strip mall terrorizing a teenager and his mother who is impaled by flying glass; the same tornado along with an additional EF2 tornado cuts a path of destruction through Ottawa.
2	2	"Mayhem on Main Street"	May 9, 2020
Memorial Day weekend 2018, almost 10 inches of rain in two hours sends a monster wave of water through downtown Ellicott City, MD; it traps tourists and business owners, sweeps vehicles away and collapses buildings.
3	3	"Cat 5 Emergency"	May 17, 2020
Category 5 Dorian becomes the strongest hurricane to hit the Bahamas; as storm surge pours into his home, a family wades through chest deep water in a quest to find higher ground; locals on jet skis rescue neighbors from flooded homes.
4	4	"Horror in the Heartland"	May 24, 2020
An unexpected tornado outbreak erupts over central Iowa on July 19, 2018; two EF2 tornado strike Bondurant, a large EF3 tornado makes a direct hit on a Vermeer plant complex filled with hundreds of workers and guests in Pella, and another EF3 tornado tears directly down Marshalltown's main street.
5	5	"Surviving Katrina's Surge"	May 31, 2020
In August 2005, Hurricane Katrina's massive 28.5 foot storm surge batters the Mississippi coastline obliterating beachfront property; in Waveland, a father and son forced to flee their home by boat, find themselves rescuing neighbors from the storm surge.
6	6	"Holiday Hell"	June 14, 2020
On the day after Christmas 2015, 13 tornadoes hit the Dallas area; as an EF4 tornado rips through more populated areas, families that were hunkered down emerge to see their neighborhoods; amateur storm trackers go house to house helping victims.
7	7	"Gulf of Mexico Monster"	September 6, 2020
As Hurricane Michael fury peaks, deadly flying projectiles force a storm tracker and his team to ride out the eyewall in their car; Panama City News Herald employees hunker down at a building housing their printing press.
8	8	"Tornado Terror in Texas"	September 27, 2020
During a three-hour onslaught, the small town of Canton is caught in the crosshairs of two large and deadly tornadoes; the first reached EF4 intensity while the second was rated EF3.

=== Season 2 ===
No. overall	No. in season	Title	Original release date
9	1	"Blown Away"	May 23, 2021
On August 10, 2020, a rare Derecho strikes the town of Cedar Rapids, Iowa and other states in the Midwest, causing widespread destruction and causing four fatalities.
10	2	"Mega Fires"	May 30, 2021
In 2020, wildfires created by lightning burn Northern California during the 2020 wildfire season. Six people lose their lives.
11	3	"Hurricane Hell"	June 6, 2021
In 2020, Hurricane Isaias hits the state of North Carolina. The storm causes over 5 billion dollars in damage with 17 fatalities.
12	4	"Music City Mayhem"	June 13, 2021
On March 3, 2020, a tornado tornado touches down in the state of Tennessee, causing mass destruction across several towns.
13	5	"Downtown Destruction"	June 20, 2021
On March 28, 2020, an EF3 tornado touches down in the city of Jonesboro, Arkansas.
14	6	"Twister Terror"	June 27, 2021
On April 9, 2015, a EF4 tornado touches down in the towns of Rochelle and Fairdale, Illinois.
15	7	"Battered on the Bayou"	July 11, 2020
On August 27, 2020, Hurricane Laura, a category 4 hurricane, ravages the city of Cameron, Louisiana.
16	8	"Sally's Surge"	July 18, 2020
In 2020, Hurricane Sally, a category 2 hurricane, touches down in the state of Alabama.

=== Season 3 ===
No. overall	No. in season	Title	Original release date
17	1	"Wall of Water"	November 19, 2022
On August 21, 2021, major floods hit the town of Waverly, Tennessee. The city suffered extensive damage and 20 people lost their lives.
18	2	"Texas Tornado Terror"	November 26, 2022
On April 29, 2017, an EF4 tornado struck the town of Canton, Texas. Wind speeds reached 180 mph, five people were killed, and it caused widespread destruction.
18	3	"Danger Deja Vu"	December 3, 2022
On April 29, 2022, an EF3 tornado struck the town of Andover, Kansas. This marked its second occurrence in Andover with the first occurring in 1991.
20	4	"Cross-Country Catastrophe"	December 10, 2022
In September 2021, Hurricane Ida, a category 4 hurricane, struck the state of Louisiana. The winds caused widespread devastation and claimed 112 lives.
21	5	"Windstorm Wildfire"	December 17, 2022
On December 30, 2021, a raging wildfire carried by high mountain winds burns the town of Boulder, Colorado. Two people lose their lives and an area of 9 square miles is burned.
22	6	"Hurricane Ian"	December 24, 2022
In September 2022, Hurricane Ian, a Category 5 hurricane, strikes the state of Florida. 161 people are killed.
