= Flight Attendant School =

Flight Attendant School was a 2006 TV show on the Travel Channel that documented the lives of future Frontier Airlines flight attendants in training. The show consisted of 18 half-hour episodes, of which two were aired weekly.

== Synopsis ==
The series follows a group of flight attendant trainees from their orientation day through graduation. Pam Gardner, Frontier's vice-president of inflight services, leads the six-week training program. Hundreds of candidates apply, but only a fraction are selected for admission, and of those who make it to the program, roughly one-third don't graduate. The show follows seven trainees who live in a house together, exploring their day to day life throughout training. The show highlights just how rigorous the training program is; for example, trainees are fired if they're late to class, or if they fail more than one test. In addition, the series shows how much emergency procedures for flight attendants have changed since the September 11, 2001 attacks. According to Frank Barr, manager of flight attendant training for Frontier, "there is increased security in what to watch for, how to react and overall awareness. [For example, the trainees] have to go through a two-day security program that teaches them hands-on self defense. Flight attendants now have a new role in the security end."

== Selection of Frontier Airlines ==
According to GRB Entertainment, which produced the show for The Travel Channel, Frontier was chosen over other airlines because of its friendly, relaxed corporate culture. In addition, Frontier's management was willing to give the show the access it needed around the clock. Eddie Saenz, GRB's supervising producer, called the show more of a "docu-soap" versus a reality show, saying that events on the show would be closer to real life as opposed to the scripted tribal councils on "Survivor." Frontier, meanwhile, saw the show as an opportunity for the airline to gain more exposure.

== Other information ==
Gardner died of a blood clot in December 2005, shortly before the show's first episode aired. The final episode of the show was dedicated to her memory.
