= List of Tomb Raider media =

Tomb Raider is a media franchise consisting of action-adventure games, comic books, novels, theme park rides, and films, centring on the adventures of the female fictional British archaeologist Lara Croft. Since the release of the original Tomb Raider in 1996, the series developed into a franchise of the same name, and Lara went on to become a major icon of the video game industry. The Guinness Book of World Records recognised Lara Croft as the "Most Successful Human Videogame Heroine" in 2006. Six games in the series were developed by Core Design, and the latest six by Crystal Dynamics. The games were first published by Eidos Interactive; Eidos became part of Square Enix in April 2009. Embracer Group owns the rights to the Tomb Raider trademark and characters of the franchise. Three films were released: Lara Croft: Tomb Raider, Lara Croft: Tomb Raider – The Cradle of Life and Tomb Raider. The first two star American actress Angelina Jolie as Lara Croft, and the third Swedish actress Alicia Vikander.

The Tomb Raider video games have together sold over 100 million units, making it one of the best-selling video game series of all time.

== Overview ==
Year	Title	Developer	Platform(s)			
Year	Title	Developer	Console	Computer	Handheld	Mobile
1996	Tomb Raider	Core Design	Saturn, PS1	Windows, MS-DOS, Mac OS	N-Gage, Evercade	iOS, Android
1997	Tomb Raider II	Core Design	PS1	Windows, Mac OS	Evercade	iOS, Android
1998	Tomb Raider III	Core Design	PS1	Windows, Mac OS	Evercade	
1999	Tomb Raider: The Last Revelation	Core Design	PS1, Dreamcast	Windows, Mac OS	Evercade	
2000	Tomb Raider: The Nightmare Stone	Core Design			GBC	
2000	Tomb Raider: Chronicles	Core Design	PS1, Dreamcast	Windows, Mac OS	Evercade	
2001	Tomb Raider: Curse of the Sword	Core Design			GBC	
2002	Tomb Raider: The Prophecy	Core Design			GBA	
2003	Tomb Raider: The Angel of Darkness	Core Design	PS2	Windows, Mac OS X		
2006	Tomb Raider: Legend	Crystal Dynamics	PS2, PS3, Xbox, Xbox 360, GameCube	Windows	GBA, PSP, DS	Java ME
2007	Tomb Raider: Anniversary	Crystal Dynamics	PS2, PS3, Xbox 360, Wii	Windows, Mac OS X	PSP	
2008	Tomb Raider: Underworld	Crystal Dynamics	PS2, PS3, Xbox 360, Wii	Windows, Mac OS X	DS	Java ME
2010	Lara Croft and the Guardian of Light	Crystal Dynamics	PS3, Xbox 360, Stadia	Windows		iOS
2013	Tomb Raider	Crystal Dynamics	PS3, Xbox 360, PS4, Xbox One, Stadia, Nintendo Switch, Nintendo Switch 2	Windows, Mac OS X, Linux, Android (Nvidia Shield TV)	SteamDeck	
2014	Lara Croft and the Temple of Osiris	Crystal Dynamics	PS4, Xbox One, Stadia	Windows		
2015	Rise of the Tomb Raider	Crystal Dynamics	PS4, Xbox 360, Xbox One, Stadia, Nintendo Switch 2	Windows, Mac OS X, Linux	SteamDeck	
2018	Shadow of the Tomb Raider	Eidos Montréal	PS4, Xbox One, Stadia	Windows, Mac OS X, Linux	SteamDeck	
2024	Tomb Raider I–III Remastered	Aspyr Media	PS4, PS5, Xbox One, Xbox Series, Switch	Windows	Switch	
2025	Tomb Raider IV–VI Remastered	Aspyr Media	PS4, PS5, Xbox One, Xbox Series, Switch	Windows	Switch	
2027	Tomb Raider: Legacy of Atlantis	Crystal Dynamics	PS5, Xbox Series	Windows	Switch 2	
2028	Tomb Raider: Catalyst	Crystal Dynamics	PS5, Xbox Series	Windows		

== Video games ==
=== Main series ===
Game	Details
Tomb Raider Original release date(s): EU: 22 November 1996; NA: 15 November1996	Release years by system: 1996 - Sega Saturn, MS-DOS, PlayStation, Pocket PC; 1998 - Mac OS (as Tomb Raider Gold); 2003 - N-Gage; 2009 - PlayStation Network (PS3, PSP); 2013 - iOS; 2015 - Android; 2024 - Nintendo Switch, PlayStation 4, PlayStation 5, Windows, Xbox One, Xbox Series, Evercade: An expansion pack called Tomb Raider: Unfinished Business (known as Shadow of the Cat in North America) was released in 1998 on Windows and Mac.
Tomb Raider II Original release date(s): EU: 19 November 1997; NA: 18 November 1997	Release years by system: 1997 - PlayStation, Windows; 1998 - Mac OS; 2009 - PlayStation Network (PS3, PSP); 2014 - iOS; 2015 - Android; 2024 - Nintendo Switch, PlayStation 4, PlayStation 5, Windows, Xbox One, Xbox Series, Evercade: An expansion pack called Tomb Raider II: Golden Mask was released in 1999 on Windows and Mac.
Tomb Raider III Original release date(s): EU: December 1998; NA: 21 November 1998	Release years by system: 1998 - PlayStation, Windows; 1999 - Mac OS; 2009 - PlayStation Network (PS3, PSP); 2024 - Nintendo Switch, PlayStation 4, PlayStation 5, Windows, Xbox One, Xbox Series, Evercade: A stand-alone sequel called Tomb Raider III: The Lost Artefact was released in 2000 on Windows and Mac.
Tomb Raider: The Last Revelation Original release date(s): EU: November 1999; NA: 22 November 1999; JP: 19 July 2000	Release years by system: 1999 - PlayStation, Windows; 2000 - Dreamcast, Mac OS; 2009 - PlayStation Network (PS3, PSP): A stand-alone bonus level created by Core and The Times, called Tomb Raider: The Times Exclusive was released in December 1999 on Windows.
Tomb Raider: Chronicles Original release date(s): NA: November 2000	Release years by system: 2000 - Dreamcast, Windows, PlayStation; 2011 - PlayStation Network (PS3, PSP): In late 2000, Eidos released the Tomb Raider Level Editor (the Windows version features a disc with the Tomb Raider Editor).
Tomb Raider: The Angel of Darkness Original release date(s): NA: 20 June 2003	Release years by system: 2003 - PlayStation 2, Windows, Mac OS
Tomb Raider: Legend Original release date(s): EU: 7 April 2006; NA: 11 April 2006	Release years by system: 2006 - PlayStation 2, Xbox, Xbox 360, Windows, GC, PSP; 2011 - PlayStation 3
Tomb Raider: Legend Original release date(s): EU: 7 April 2006; NA: 11 April 2006	Notes: First reboot of the franchise. There are also some other versions based on the game: Tomb Raider: Legend (2006) - a 2D version for the Game Boy Advance; Tomb Raider: Legend (2006) - a 2.5D version for the Nintendo DS; Tomb Raider: Legend (2006) - ExEn/Java
Tomb Raider: Anniversary Original release date(s): EU: 1 June 2007; NA: 5 June 2007	Release years by system: 2007 - PlayStation 2, Xbox 360, Windows, Wii, PSP; 2011 - PS3
Tomb Raider: Anniversary Original release date(s): EU: 1 June 2007; NA: 5 June 2007	Notes: A remake of the original game.
Tomb Raider: Underworld Original release date(s): NA: 18 November 2008; EU: 21 November 2008; AU: 5 December 2008	Release years by system: 2008 - PlayStation 3, Xbox 360, Windows, Wii, Nintendo DS; 2009 - PlayStation 2; 2012 - Mac OS X There are also two more downloadable levels: Beneath the Ashes and Lara's Shadow - released on 24 February and 10 March 2009 as downloadable content for Xbox 360.
Tomb Raider Original release date(s): WW: 5 March 2013	Release years by system: 2013 - PlayStation 3, Xbox 360, Windows; 2014 - PlayStation 4, Xbox One, Mac OS X 2016 - Linux; 2017 - Android (Nvidia Shield TV); 2019 - Stadia; 2025 - Switch, Switch 2
Tomb Raider Original release date(s): WW: 5 March 2013	Notes: Second reboot of the franchise. The first instalment in the Survivor trilogy.
Rise of the Tomb Raider Original release date(s): WW: 10 November 2015	Release years by system: 2015 - Xbox 360, Xbox One; 2016 - PlayStation 4, Windows; 2018 - Mac OS, Linux; 2019 - Stadia, 2026 - Nintendo Switch 2
Rise of the Tomb Raider Original release date(s): WW: 10 November 2015	Notes: Sequel to Tomb Raider (2013). Second instalment in the Survivor trilogy.
Shadow of the Tomb Raider Original release date(s): WW: 14 September 2018	Release years by system: 2018 - Xbox One, PlayStation 4, Windows; 2019 - Stadia, macOS, Linux
Shadow of the Tomb Raider Original release date(s): WW: 14 September 2018	Notes: Sequel to Rise of the Tomb Raider (2015). The third and final instalment in the Survivor trilogy.
Tomb Raider: Legacy of Atlantis Original release date(s): WW: 12 February 2027	Release years by system: 2027 - Nintendo Switch 2, PlayStation 5, Xbox Series X/S, Windows
Tomb Raider: Legacy of Atlantis Original release date(s): WW: 12 February 2027	Notes: Third reboot of the franchise. A reimagining of the original 1996 game.
Tomb Raider: Catalyst Original release date(s): WW: 2028	Release years by system: 2028 - PlayStation 5, Xbox Series X/S, Windows
Tomb Raider: Catalyst Original release date(s): WW: 2028	Notes: Considered a direct sequel and continuation from Tomb Raider: Underworld.

=== Mobile and spin-off games ===
These games are not part of the main series as they are either handheld, mobile or spin-off games.

Year	Title	Platform
2000	Tomb Raider	Game Boy Color
2001	Tomb Raider: Curse of the Sword	Game Boy Color
2002	Tomb Raider: The Prophecy	Game Boy Advance
2002	Tomb Raider: Apocalypse Episode 1: The Eye of Osiris	Sky Gamestar (UK only)
2003	Tomb Raider: The Osiris Codex	Java ME
2003	Tomb Raider: Apocalypse Episode 2: The Shadow Falls	Sky Gamestar (UK only)
2003	Tomb Raider: Apocalypse Episode 3: The Last Midnight	Sky Gamestar (UK only)
2004	Tomb Raider: Quest for Cinnabar	
2004	Tomb Raider: Elixir of Life	
2005	Tomb Raider: The Temple of Anubis	Sky Gamestar (UK only)
2006	Tomb Raider: Puzzle Paradox	
2006	Tomb Raider: The Action Adventure	DVD player
2010	Lara Croft and the Guardian of Light	PlayStation 3, Xbox 360, Windows, iOS, Nintendo Switch
2013	Lara Croft: Reflections	iOS
2014	Lara Croft and the Temple of Osiris	PlayStation 4, Xbox One, Windows, Stadia, Nintendo Switch
2015	Lara Croft: Relic Run	iOS, Android, Windows Phone
2015	Lara Croft Go	iOS, Android, Windows Phone, Windows; PlayStation 4, PlayStation Vita, macOS, Linux (2016)
2023	Tomb Raider Reloaded	iOS, Android
2025	Tomb Raider Pinball	Nintendo Switch, PlayStation 4/5, Windows, Xbox One, Xbox Series X/S, Meta Quest, AtGames FX Legends 4KP, iOS, Android

=== Collected editions and remasters ===
- The Tomb Raider Trilogy collects the three Tomb Raider games from the second series: Tomb Raider: Legend, Tomb Raider: Anniversary and Tomb Raider: Underworld. It was released in 2011 as part of the Classics HD line. The first two games were ported to the PS3 by Buzz Monkey Software. Also included is PlayStation Network Trophy support, bonus Lara Croft and Viking Thrall avatars for use in PlayStation Home, a theme pack for the XrossMediaBar and making-of videos. The two downloadable episodes from the Xbox 360 version of Underworld are not included.
- Tomb Raider: Definitive Survivor Trilogy is a collection containing the third series: Tomb Raider (2013), Rise of the Tomb Raider and Shadow of the Tomb Raider. It was released on 18 March 2021, for PlayStation 4, PlayStation 5, Xbox One and Xbox Series X/S.
- The Lara Croft Collection is a collection containing Feral Interactive's spinoff series: Lara Croft and the Guardian of Light and Lara Croft and the Temple of Osiris. It was released for Nintendo Switch on 29 June 2023.
- Tomb Raider I–III Remastered is a collection of remasters of Core Design's first three Tomb Raider games, developed and published by Aspyr, which was released on 14 February 2024, for Nintendo Switch, PlayStation 4, PlayStation 5, Windows, Xbox One, and Xbox Series X/S. The remaster includes options for new control schemes, and revamped graphics.
- Tomb Raider Collection 1 is an Evercade re-release of the first three games on a single cartridge. It was released on July 31, 2024. The cartridge was also bundled with the Evercade VS-R and EXP-R models, which launched on the same day.
- Tomb Raider IV–VI Remastered is a collection of remasters of Core Design's last three entries, Tomb Raider: The Last Revelation, Tomb Raider: Chronicles, and Tomb Raider: The Angel of Darkness, developed and published by Aspyr, which was released on 14 February 2025, for Nintendo Switch, PlayStation 4, PlayStation 5, Windows, Xbox One, and Xbox Series X/S.
- Tomb Raider Collection 2 is an Evercade re-release of the fourth and fifth game on a single cartridge. The version of The Last Revelation present on the cartridge included the bonus level The Times, which was made available on the main menu. It was released in April 2025.

=== Level Editor ===
The Tomb Raider Level Editor, Room Editor, is a tool released by Eidos Interactive with the video game Tomb Raider Chronicles in late 2000. Later, it was made available free to download from the Internet. Since then it has enabled players to design new levels of their own, set in locations from the original games or in new locations.

=== The Action Adventure ===
An interactive DVD was released by Bright Entertainment under licence from Eidos in 2006, called Tomb Raider: The Action Adventure. The game takes advantage of standard DVD player audiovisual capabilities and the remote control. It has puzzles and action elements, while the story is based on The Angel of Darkness.

=== Pachinko ===
- Tomb Raider (2006)
- CR Tomb Raider MF-TV (2007)
- CR Tomb Raider MR (2007)
- CR Tomb Raider XF-T (2007)

=== Crossovers ===
- Lightning Returns: Final Fantasy XIII- A DLC available at launch in 2014 included a Lara Croft outfit for Lightning.
- Heavenstrike Rivals- A 2014 game that included a Tomb Raider crossover.
- Spelunker World- A 2015 crossover event was held.
- Final Fantasy XV- A 2018 crossover event added a Lara Croft outfit.
- Final Fantasy Brave Exvius - A 2018 crossover event added Lara Croft as a playable character.
- Brawlhalla- A 2020 crossover event added Lara Croft as a playable character.
- Rainbow Six Siege- A 2020 update added Lara Croft.
- Fortnite- Lara Croft was added in 2021.
- War of the Visions: Final Fantasy Brave Exvius- Lara Croft was added in 2021.
- Ghost Recon Breakpoint- A 2021 crossover event Relics of the Ancients included Tomb Raider cosmetics.
- Call of Duty: Modern Warfare 2- A 2023 update added Lara as a playable operator.
- Call of Duty: Warzone- Lara was also transferred over to Warzone later that year.
- PowerWash Simulator- A free Tomb Raider expansion was added in 2023, featuring five levels set on the Croft estate.
- Fall Guys- Lara Croft cosmetics were added in 2023.
- The Walking Dead: Survivors- Lara Croft was added in 2023.
- Dead by Daylight- Lara Croft was added to the multiplayer online horror game as a DLC in 2024.
- Naraka: Bladepoint- Lara Croft cosmetic items were added in 2024.
- Hero Wars- A Tomb Raider crossover event was held in 2024.
- The Crew: Motorfest- A paid expansion, Tomb Raider: Secrets of Ni’hau, was added in 2026.

=== Cancelled games ===
- The Further Adventures of Lara Croft- An expansion pack for Tomb Raider II. In late 1997 this project was adapted into a full sequel and released as Tomb Raider III in 1998.
- Tomb Raider III (PlayStation 2)- A survival game that was briefly in development in late 1997. A reskin with a new IP was also attempted but did not release.
- Tomb Raider IV expansion - An expansion for Tomb Raider IV was in development for a planned Gold edition re-release, but cancelled. The level plans have been made public and adapted by fans in the years since.
- The Lost Dominion- A sequel to The Angel of Darkness was in early development in 2003, but cancelled after the disappointing release of its predecessor.
- 10th Anniversary- a PSP remake of the first game that was in development from 2005 to 2006. Cancelled after Rebellion purchased Core Design, but inspired Anniversary (2007). An Indiana Jones reskin was briefly attempted.
- Lego Indiana Jones crossover - A Lego themed crossover with the Indiana Jones franchise pitched in the mid-2000s. Lucasfilm rejected the idea due to disdain for the Tomb Raider series.

== Feature films ==
Tomb Raider films
Film	U.S. release date	Directed by	Screenplay by	Story by	Produced by	Lara Croft performer(s)	Initial distributor(s)
Original series
Lara Croft: Tomb Raider	15 June 2001	Simon West	John Zinman; Patrick Massett	Mike Werb; Simon West; Sara B. Cooper; Michael Colleary	Lloyd Levin; Colin Wilson; Lawrence Gordon	Angelina Jolie; Rachel Appleton (young)	Paramount Pictures
Lara Croft: Tomb Raider – The Cradle of Life	25 July 2003	Jan de Bont	Dean Georgaris	James V. Hart; Steven E. de Souza	Lloyd Levin; Lawrence Gordon	Angelina Jolie	Paramount Pictures
Reboot
Tomb Raider	16 March 2018	Roar Uthaug	Alastair Siddons; Geneva Robertson-Dworet	Evan Daugherty; Geneva Robertson-Dworet	Graham King	Alicia Vikander; Maisy De Freitas and Emily Carey (young)	Warner Bros.

There were initially two film adaptations made in the early 2000s that starred Angelina Jolie as Lara Croft in Lara Croft: Tomb Raider in 2001 and its sequel, The Cradle of Life, in 2003. While both films were financially successful, neither of them were well received by critics. A reboot starring Alicia Vikander as Lara Croft was released in 2018, which was better received. A sequel of the 2018 film was in development with Vikander returning as Croft but it was later cancelled with the film rights reverted to the game company and prompted a bidding war among studios. Lara Croft makes a minor appearance in the 2018 film Ready Player One.

In 2015, Adrian Askarieh, producer of the Hitman films, stated that he hoped to oversee a shared universe of Square Enix films with Just Cause, Hitman, Tomb Raider, Deus Ex, and Thief, but admitted that he does not have the rights to Tomb Raider. Some reports such as the Game Central reporters at Metro UK commented that the shared universe was unlikely, pointing out that no progress had been made on any Just Cause, Deus Ex nor Thief films.

=== Tomb Raider (2018) ===
Rumors of a third film adaptation appeared in 2007, and was announced in 2009. The film rights were acquired by GK Films in 2011, confirming its development four years later, with the involvement of Warner Bros. and MGM. The film is a reboot, showing Lara's first adventure and is based on the 2013 video game with Lara searching for her father. Alicia Vikander was cast as Lara Croft in the reboot. Walton Goggins was cast as the film's villain; he called the plot "Raiders of the Lost Ark meets a genre version of the Joseph Conrad novel Victory: An Island Tale". Daniel Wu was cast as Lu Ren, a ship captain who joins forces with the adventurous Lara Croft on her quest to find her father. The film was released on March 16, 2018. Filming began on January 23, 2017.

=== Tomb Raider: Obsidian (cancelled) ===
Prior to the release of the reboot film, Alicia Vikander expressed interest in returning as Lara Croft for a second film. In April 2019, Amy Jump was hired to write a script for a possible sequel, with Vikander attached. In September, Ben Wheatley, Jump's husband, signed on to direct the sequel, that was planned for a 19 March 2021 release date and his long-time cinematographer Laurie Rose would also work on the sequel. In January 2021, Misha Green signed to replace Jump and Wheatley as writer and director. The film was planned to be released theatrically in the U.S. via the studio's distribution and marketing joint venture United Artists Releasing, and internationally through Warner Bros. Pictures. The first draft of the script was completed in May, with the working title Tomb Raider: Obsidian. In July 2022, MGM lost the film rights to the Tomb Raider franchise, after the window ran out to give the sequel the green light, culminating in Vikander's departure from the lead role. The rights reverted to the game company and prompted a bidding war among studios.

=== Possible Amazon reboot ===
In January 2023, MGM sister company Amazon Studios (now known as Amazon MGM Studios) secured the rights to a new Tomb Raider reboot film, with Dmitri M. Johnson and his company dj2 Entertainment attached to produce. The film was intended to be interconnected with a television series from Phoebe Waller-Bridge and a video game from Crystal Dynamics, forming a Tomb Raider shared universe and franchise.

== Television ==
Series	Season	Episodes	Originally released			Lara Croft performer	Showrunner(s)
Series	Season	Episodes	First released	Last released	Network	Lara Croft performer	Showrunner(s)
Revisioned: Tomb Raider	1	10	10 July 2007	13 November 2007	GameTap	Minnie Driver	Ricardo Sanchez
Tomb Raider: The Legend of Lara Croft	1	8	10 October 2024		Netflix	Hayley Atwell	Tasha Huo
Tomb Raider: The Legend of Lara Croft	2	8	11 December 2025		Netflix	Hayley Atwell	Tasha Huo
Tomb Raider	1	TBA	TBA		Prime Video	Sophie Turner	Phoebe Waller-Bridge and Chad Hodge

=== Revisioned: Tomb Raider (2007) ===
In 2007, an animated series based on the character was produced and broadcast by GameTap as part of a series of re-imaginings of popular video game series. Titled Revisioned: Tomb Raider, the series voiced by Minnie Driver ran between May and June 2007. Multiple noted animators and writers were involved with the series, including Peter Chung, Warren Ellis, Gail Simone and Jim Lee. While the production team had great creative freedom, they were given a basic guideline for the character by the developers so that Lara would not do anything out of character.

=== Tomb Raider: The Legend of Lara Croft (2024–25) ===
In late January 2021, Netflix and Legendary Entertainment announced an anime-style series adaptation based on the franchise, with Tasha Huo as the showrunner and executive producer. The series primarily takes place after the events of its video game reboot trilogy. Hayley Atwell voices Lara Croft in the series. Allen Maldonado voices Lara's tech expert, Zip. Earl Baylon reprises his voice role as Jonah Maiava from the games. Karen Fukuhara voices Lara's close friend Sam Nishimura. The first season was released on October 10, 2024. The same month, it was renewed for a second season, later confirmed as the final season, which was released on December 11, 2025.

=== Tomb Raider (forthcoming) ===
In January 2023, The Hollywood Reporter reported that Phoebe Waller-Bridge was developing a Tomb Raider television series for Amazon Prime Video. It was officially greenlit and titled Tomb Raider in May 2024. and is produced by Crystal Dynamics and Amazon MGM Studios. Waller-Bridge writes for the series and serves as an executive producer, while also working in close partnership with the game's general manager Dallas Dickinson and the game producers. On 14 November 2024, it was reported that Sophie Turner was in talks for the role. In September 2025, Turner was confirmed for the role of Lara, and the series was set to begin production in January 2026. It was also announced that Chad Hodge would co-showrun and executive produce the series alongside Waller-Bridge.

== Short films ==
Film	Release date	Lara Croft performer(s)	Director(s)	Writer(s)	Producer(s)	Initial distributor(s)
Tomb Raider: The Trilogy	1998	—	Steen Agro	Steen Agro	Janey de Nordwall	Eidos Interactive; Core Design
Tomb Raider: The Myth of El Hawa	21 October 2022	Jonell Elliott (voice)	Ash Kapriyelov &Tina Ljubenkov	Murti Schofield	—	—

=== Tomb Raider: The Trilogy (1998) ===
A short film called Tomb Raider: The Trilogy was produced in 1998 by Silver Films for the Tomb Raider III launch party. The film was not screened outside the event at the Natural History Museum in London. Producer Janey de Nordwall found the original digibeta tape and released the short film on the Tomb Raider YouTube page in 2016.

=== Tomb Raider: The Myth of El Hawa (2022) ===
A short animated film entitled The Myth of El Hawa was released in 2022. It covers the missing storyline explaining Lara's survival between The Last Revelation and The Angel of Darkness. It was written by Murti Schofield, the writer from The Angel of Darkness, and featured returning Lara voice actress Jonell Elliott, who collaborated with fans to produce the film.

== Reception ==
=== Box office performance ===
Film	Release date	Budget	Box office gross			Ref(s)
Film	Release date	Budget	North America	Other territories	Worldwide	Ref(s)
Lara Croft: Tomb Raider	15 June 2001	$115,000,000	$131,168,070	$143,535,270	$274,703,340	
Lara Croft: Tomb Raider – The Cradle of Life	25 July 2003	$95,000,000	$65,660,196	$90,845,192	$156,505,388	
Tomb Raider	16 March 2018	$94,000,000	$58,250,803	$216,400,000	$274,650,803	
Total		$304,000,000	$254,249,981	$450,480,462	$704,730,443	
List indicator: A dark grey cell indicates the information is not available for the film.

=== Critical and public response ===
Film	Critical		Public
Film	Rotten Tomatoes	Metacritic	CinemaScore
Lara Croft: Tomb Raider	20% (163 reviews)	33 (31 reviews)	B
Lara Croft: Tomb Raider – The Cradle of Life	24% (175 reviews)	43 (34 reviews)	B-
Tomb Raider	52% (326 reviews)	48 (53 reviews)	B

== Music ==
=== Soundtracks ===
Several soundtrack albums have been released over the course of the franchise's history. Initially, music from the game was only released on promotional samplers. However, the 2013 reboot and its 2015 sequel received full soundtrack releases. Additionally, there has been at least one album release for each of the three Tomb Raider films.

Year	Title	Composer(s)	Notes	Label
1999	Tomb Raider: Toutes Les Musiques	Nathan McCree	Promotional release included with the French magazine Total Play, issue 14. Includes music from Tomb Raider, II and III.	
2001	Lara Croft: Tomb Raider – Original Motion Picture Soundtrack	Various artists		Elektra Records
2001	Lara Croft: Tomb Raider – Original Motion Picture Score	Graeme Revell		Elektra Records
2003	Lara Croft: Tomb Raider – The Cradle of Life (Original Motion Picture Soundtrack)	Various artists		Hollywood Records
2003	Lara Croft: Tomb Raider – The Cradle of Life (Original Motion Picture Score)	Alan Silvestri		Varèse Sarabande
2002/03	Tomb Raider: The Angel of Darkness (Collector's Edition) Soundtrack	Peter Connelly, Martin Iveson	Promotional album released on a bonus DVD with Tomb Raider: The Angel of Darkness in 2002 and as a standalone CD album in 2003.	
2007	Tomb Raider: Anniversary (Collector's Edition) Soundtrack	Troels Brun Folmann	Promotional album released with the Tomb Raider: Anniversary Collector's Edition, which includes music from Tomb Raider: Legend.	
2008	Tomb Raider: Underworld (Limited Edition) Soundtrack	Colin O'Malley	Promotional album featured on Tomb Raider: Underworld's limited edition release.	
2013	Tomb Raider – Original Soundtrack	Jason Graves		Sumthing Distribution
2015	Rise of the Tomb Raider – Original Game Soundtrack	Bobby Tahouri		
2017	The Tomb Raider Suite	Nathan McCree	Re-recording of material from Tomb Raider, Tomb Raider II and Tomb Raider III that have been extended from its original game versions.	Greenwich Music
2018	Tomb Raider – Original Motion Picture Soundtrack	Tom Holkenborg	Soundtrack album for the 2018 reboot film.	Sony Classical Records
2019	Tomb Raider: The Dark Angel Symphony	Peter Connelly	Re-recording of material from Tomb Raider: The Last Revelation, Tomb Raider Chronicles and Tomb Raider: The Angel of Darkness. Also includes the original music from those games.	Backrest Records
2021	The Tomb Raider Suite: The Synth Mixes	Nathan McCree	Synth-recording of material from Tomb Raider, Tomb Raider II and Tomb Raider III that have been extended from its original game versions.	
2021	Tomb Raider - The Angel of Darkness (Midi Demos)	Peter Connelly, Martin Iveson	Midi Demo-recording of material from Tomb Raider: The Angel of Darkness.	Backrest Records
2021	Tomb Raider - The Dark Angel Symphony (Midi Demos)	Peter Connelly	Midi Demo-recording of material from Tomb Raider: The Last Revelation, Tomb Raider Chronicles and Tomb Raider: The Angel of Darkness.	Backrest Records
2024	Tomb Raider: The Legend of Lara Croft (Soundtracks from the Netflix Series)	Pinar Toprak and Gerrit Wunder	Soundtrack albums for the first season of the Netflix animated series.	Milan Records
2025	Tomb Raider: The Legend of Lara Croft - Season 2 (Soundtracks from the Netflix Series)	Pinar Toprak and Gerrit Wunder	Soundtrack albums for the second season of the Netflix animated series.	Milan Records

== Comics ==
Beginning in 1997, Lara Croft was featured in multiple comics produced by Top Cow Productions. Her first appearance is a cameo in Witchblade. She later appeared in a titular comic book series which ran for fifty issues from 1999 to 2005. An attempt by Top Cow to restart the comic in 2007 stalled due to licensing issues. A new comic book series began in 2014, set within the 2013 reboot's continuity and bridging the narrative gap between the reboot and its sequel.

== Novels ==
Six official novels have also been written. The first three, set within the original timeline, were published between 2003 and 2005. The first novel, The Amulet of Power, was set after the events of The Last Revelation, while its sequels The Lost Cult and The Man of Bronze are set after the first novel. Another novel set within the 2013 reboot timeline, Tomb Raider: The Ten Thousand Immortals, was published in 2014 as a continuation of the original story. A fifth book, titled Lara Croft and the Blade of Gwynnever, also written by Dan Abnett and Nik Vincent was published in late 2016, and is a stand-alone adventure. The sixth book, Path to Apocalypse, written by S. D. Perry and published in 2018, is a tie-in to the Shadow of the Tomb Raider game and is set between the Mexico and Peru parts of the game.

Year	Title	Author(s)	Publisher
2001	Lara Croft: Tomb Raider	Dave Stern	Pocket Books
2003	Lara Croft: Tomb Raider - The Cradle of Life	Dave Stern	Pocket Books
2003	Tomb Raider: The Amulet of Power	Mike Resnick	Del Rey
2004	Tomb Raider: The Lost Cult	E. E. Knight	Del Rey
2004	Tomb Raider: The Man of Bronze	James Alan Gardner	Del Rey
2014	Tomb Raider: The Ten Thousand Immortals	Dan Abnett, Nik Vincent	Brady Games
2016	Lara Croft and the Blade of Gwynnever	Dan Abnett	Prima Games
2018	Shadow of the Tomb Raider: Path of the Apocalypse	S. D. Perry	Titan Books

== Tabletop roleplaying games ==
In February 2024, Evil Hat Productions announced Tomb Raider: Shadows of Truth, an officially licensed tabletop roleplaying game using the Powered by the Apocalypse mechanics. The release date for the game has yet to be announced. In June 2025, Evil Hat announced that the project has been cancelled "due to creative differences" between the publisher and Crystal Dynamics.

== Board games ==
- Tomb Raider: The Angel of Darkness by Identity Games (2003)
- Tomb Raider: Underworld by Tilsit Éditions (2010)
- Tomb Raider Legends: The Board Game by Square Enix (2019)
- Tomb Raider: The Crypt of Chronos by Iconiq Studios (2026)

== Attractions ==
- Tomb Raider: The Ride (2002–2007)
- Tomb Raider: Firefall (2005–2008)
- Tomb Raider: The Live Experience (2022–2024)
