= Shadow of the Tomb Raider =

2018 video game

- Developer: Eidos-Montréal (Note: Additional work by Crystal Dynamics. Windows and Stadia ports by Nixxes Software, Linux and macOS ports by Feral Interactive and Nintendo Switch 2 port by Aspyr.)
- Publisher: Square Enix (Note: Feral Interactive published the macOS and Linux ports. Aspyr published the Nintendo Switch 2 port.)
- Director: Daniel Chayer-Bisson
- Producers: Mario Chabtini; Fleur Marty
- Designers: Daniel Drapeau; Michel Leduc St-Arnaud; Heath Smith
- Programmer: Frédéric Robichaud
- Artists: Wilson Mui; Martin Dubeau
- Writers: Jason Dozois; Jill Murray
- Composer: Brian D'Oliveira
- Series: Tomb Raider
- Platforms: PlayStation 4; Windows; Xbox One; Linux; macOS; Stadia; Nintendo Switch 2
- Release: September 14, 2018: PlayStation 4, Windows, Xbox One; September 14, 2018; Linux, macOS; November 5, 2019; Stadia; November 19, 2019; Nintendo Switch 2; October 22, 2026
- Genre: Action-adventure
- Modes: Single-player, multiplayer (Note: Only available in the Season Pass)

Shadow of the Tomb Raider is a 2018 action-adventure game developed by Eidos-Montréal and published by Square Enix. As the sequel to Rise of the Tomb Raider (2015), it is the twelfth mainline entry in the Tomb Raider series and the final installment of the Survivor trilogy. The story follows Lara Croft as she ventures through the tropical regions of the Americas to the legendary city of Paititi, battling the paramilitary organization Trinity while racing to stop a Mayan apocalypse she inadvertently unleashed. To survive, Lara must traverse treacherous environments and combat enemies using firearms and stealth across various semi-open hubs. In these areas, players can raid challenge tombs to unlock rewards, complete side missions, and scavenge for resources to craft essential gear.

Because Crystal Dynamics shifted its focus to Marvel's Avengers (2020), Eidos-Montréal took over as the lead developer. Development began in 2015 following the completion of Rise of the Tomb Raider and lasted until July 2018. The game was designed to conclude the origin story that began in the 2013 reboot, centering on the theme of "descent"—both into the physical depths of the jungle and the darker aspects of Lara's personality. The setting and narrative were based on Mayan, Incan, and Aztec mythologies; the team consulted historians to authentically depict the architecture and people of Paititi, and conducted field trips to Machu Picchu and the Yucatán. Camilla Luddington returned to provide voice and motion-capture work for Lara. With an estimated budget of US$110–135 million, it remains one of the most expensive games ever made.

The game was released for PlayStation 4, Windows, and Xbox One in September 2018, followed by versions for Linux, macOS, and Stadia in November 2019, and a version for Nintendo Switch 2 in October 2026. It received generally favorable reviews, though it was not as highly acclaimed as its predecessors. Critics praised the gameplay, level design, and the renewed emphasis on puzzles and challenge tombs, but some criticized the story, Lara’s characterization, the progression system, and a perceived lack of innovation. Despite a slow start, the game eventually sold over 8.9 million units worldwide and was expanded through several downloadable content releases. An animated television series, Tomb Raider: The Legend of Lara Croft, premiered on Netflix in 2024, and the next mainline entry, Tomb Raider: Legacy of Atlantis is scheduled for release in 2027.

== Gameplay ==
A gameplay screenshot showing Lara Croft navigating a platforming puzzle

Shadow of the Tomb Raider is an action-adventure video game played from a third-person perspective. In the game, players assume control of Lara Croft, who ventures through the tropical regions of South America to stop a Mayan apocalypse she unleashed. Lara faces a variety of enemies, including soldiers from the paramilitary organization Trinity, hostile indigenous tribes, and dangerous animals such as jaguars and moray eels. The game prioritized stealth over direct combat with enemies. Players can use Lara's Survival Instinct to scan the environment to identify enemies and objects of interest. They can hide behind cover and vine walls to ambush enemies, and sneak through tall grass and bushes to avoid being detected. They can also use mud to camouflage themselves. Certain items can be thrown to distract unsuspecting enemies, while smoke bombs can be used to confuse them. Lara's Survival Instinct can also be used to identify if a stealth takedown will alert nearby enemies. If direct combat is inevitable, players can also use Lara's bows and arrows and a variety of firearms to defend her. They can also roll or dodge to avoid incoming attacks, and disengage from combat when they escape from enemies' line of sight. As players return to stealth, the artificial intelligence of enemies will begin searching for Lara starting from her last known position.

Players navigate intricate environments to progress. Lara is equipped with a pickaxe that allows her to climb surfaces and hang over ledges, and a grappling hook to swing across gaps in the environment. She can also use her rope to abseil down a cliff. The game features several large hub worlds where players can converse with other non-playable characters, discover side quests, and trade with merchants. Lara's outfits also provide her with added gameplay perks and bonuses. While exploring, players can collect raw materials and hunt wild creatures for crafting arrows, consumables, and other upgrades. Herbal plants can also be mixed and consumed to add certain benefits, such as restoring her health and briefly increasing her perception. Players can also craft two arrow variants: Fire arrows, and Fear arrows that cause enemies to hallucinate and attack their allies. If the player has to explore underwater, they must come up for air at specific air pockets in time to avoid suffocation. The difficulty of the gameplay experience—including exploration, puzzles, and combat—can be separately adjusted.

By completing missions and playing the game, players will gain experience points (XP). If they have enough XP, they receive a Skill Point, which can then be spent on three skill trees to upgrade Lara's skills in combat, stealth, and exploration. allowing her to perform actions such as consuming less oxygen during swimming underwater or placing booby traps on defeated enemies. As players explore, they will discover campfires, which allow them to rest, manage Lara's resources, and upgrade weapons. Certain areas in the game may be closed off until players acquire the necessary tools to overcome the obstacles blocking access. Puzzles in the game are physics-based, and the game features two types of optional puzzles: Challenge tombs are self-contained dungeons with elaborated puzzles that reward players with a unique skill, and Crypts, which are smaller variants that reward them with outfit blueprints. By finding collectibles, Lara's language skills will increase, allowing her to decipher the text found on monuments. An Immersion mode enables players to hear the background conversations of the locals in their native languages; when turned off the conversations are heard in players' chosen voice-over language.

== Plot ==
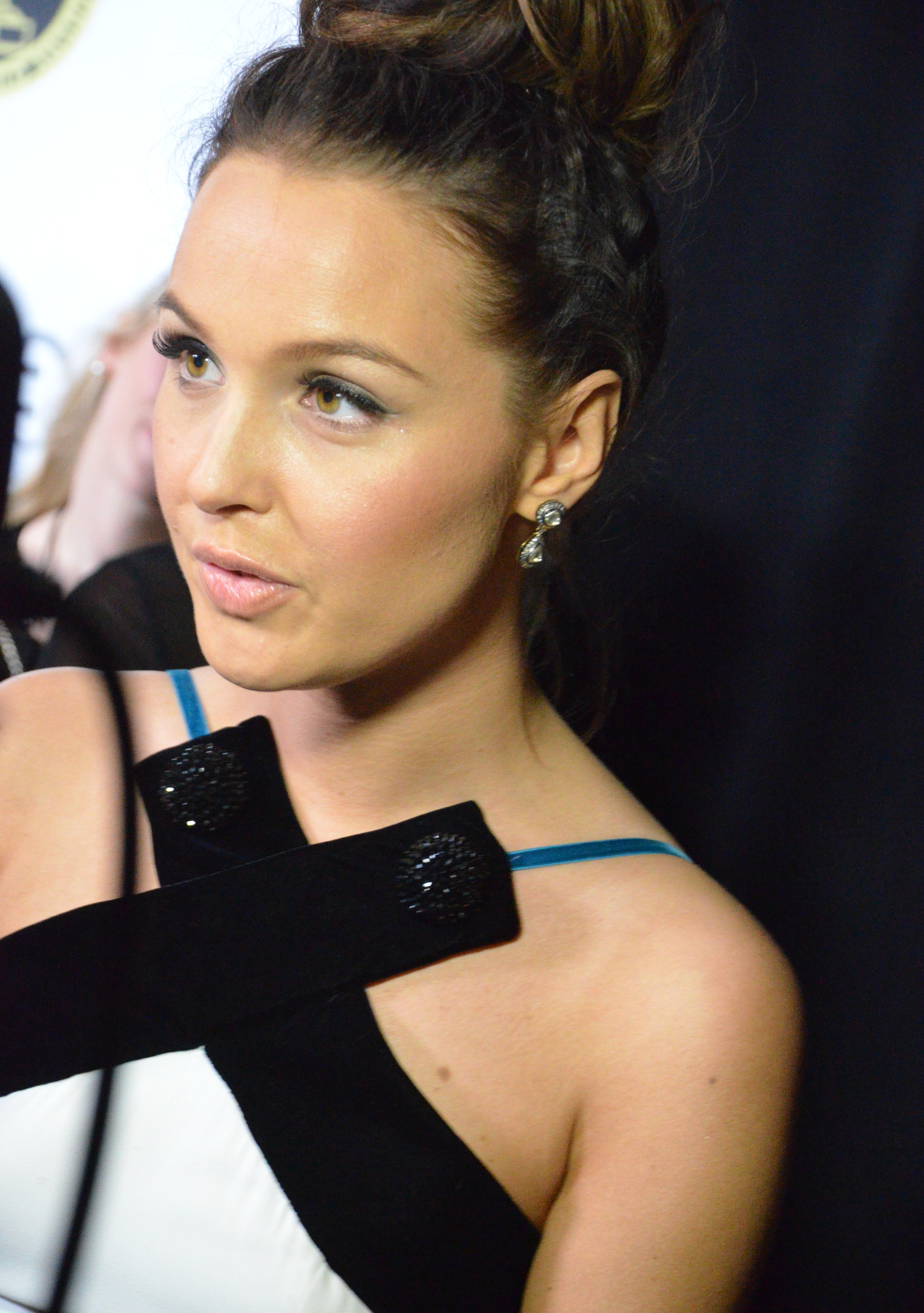
Camilla Luddington portrayed Lara Croft in Shadow of the Tomb Raider.

In 2015, months since the events of Rise of the Tomb Raider, Lara Croft (Camilla Luddington) and her friend Jonah Maiava (Earl Baylon) have dedicated themselves to stopping the activities of paramilitary organization Trinity. The two track a cell to an island named Cozumel in Mexico, led by Pedro Dominguez (Carlos Leal), the head of Trinity's High Council. At Trinity's excavation site, Lara discovers a temple containing the Dagger of Chak Chel and references to a hidden city. Murals adorning the walls allude to the Silver Box of Ix Chel and warn of "the Cleansing", a Mayan apocalypse culminating in a permanent solar eclipse. Lara ignores the warnings and takes the Dagger to prevent Trinity from acquiring it. Dominguez catches her and reveals that by taking the Dagger, Lara has triggered the Cleansing. Dominguez takes the Dagger, intending to unite it with the Silver Box to stop the Cleansing and use the power it grants him to remake the world in his image. Lara and Jonah escape a tsunami that destroys Cozumel and foreshadows the coming apocalypse.

Despite growing tensions between them over her actions, Lara and Jonah pursue Dominguez into the Amazon. Their plane crashes in the Peruvian jungle during the second cataclysm—a massive storm—and the two find their way to Paititi, the hidden city shown in the murals. Exploring local tombs reveals that piercing the Silver Box with the Dagger will grant the user the power of the god Kukulkan, which must be used to halt the Cleansing. When Lara saves a boy named Etzli (Kamran Lucas), she and Jonah are brought into Paititi by his mother Unuratu (Patricia Velásquez), who is the queen of the city. Dominguez is revealed to be the leader of a cult dedicated to Kukulkan and Unuratu's brother-in-law Amaru, who was taken by Trinity as a child. Unuratu directs Lara to the Silver Box, but Lara realizes it is missing. Believing the cult already has the Silver Box, Lara and Unuratu attempt to steal it, but Unuratu is captured by the cult. Lara also encounters strange humanoid monsters identified as the Yaaxil, guardians of the Box, and their leader Crimson Fire.

Lara learns that the Box was taken centuries ago by Andres Lopez, a missionary sent by Trinity during the Spanish conquest of South America. She rescues Unuratu and realizes that Amaru does not fully understand the ritual; rather than merely imbuing Kukulkan's power, the ritual sacrifices it to stop the Cleansing. Unuratu is shot by Commander Rourke, Amaru's second in command. Before she dies, Unuratu implores Lara to complete the ritual but warns her not to let the Box influence her. Rourke attacks Lara and Jonah, who are separated as they leave Paititi. The two reunite at an oil refinery and figure out the Box's location, at a nearby Christian mission established by Lopez.

Lara and Jonah find a secret catacomb beneath the mission leading to Lopez's tomb and the Box. Amaru intercepts them and forces Lara to surrender the Box. He admits that he ordered her father's death to prevent him from finding Paititi and revealing it to the world. Lara tries to persuade Amaru to use the ritual to benefit the world. He refuses, as the Cleansing will only affect Paititi. He leaves Lara and Jonah to escape the third cataclysm, a massive earthquake that causes a landslide.

Back in Paititi, Lara and Jonah help the newly crowned Etzli lead a raid on an underground temple complex. They plan to disrupt Amaru's ceremony while avoiding the fourth cataclysm, a volcanic eruption. Lara is forced to go on alone. She encounters the Yaaxil and Crimson Fire, convincing them to help her stop Amaru. Rourke and the Trinity High Council are slaughtered by the Yaaxil while Lara makes her way to the temple summit. Amaru starts the ritual and absorbs Kukulkan's power as the solar eclipse begins. After a lengthy battle, Lara overpowers Amaru and fatally stabs him. Accepting defeat, Amaru transfers Kukulkan's power to Lara as he dies. True to Unuratu's warning, she is tempted to use the Box to revive her parents, but instead lets Crimson Fire symbolically stab her, sacrificing Kukulkan's spirit and stopping the Cleansing.

In the aftermath, Unuratu is buried, and Jonah decides to take a vacation. Lara stays in Paititi to help Etzli make the city life return to normal.

== Development ==
Development of Shadow of the Tomb Raider began in 2015, shortly after the release of Rise of the Tomb Raider. Unlike previous entries in the Tomb Raider reboot series which were primarily developed by Crystal Dynamics, Eidos-Montréal assumed major development duties for the game while Crystal Dynamics provided additional development. Eidos-Montréal estimated the game's development costs at between $75 and $100 million, making it the studio's largest project at the time. It was built using the Foundation engine, which was previously used to create Rise. The game was directed by Daniel Chayer-Bisson, one of the co-creative directors for the 2013 reboot. Development was completed on July 24, 2018, with Eidos-Montréal confirming that the game was declared gold (indicating that it was being prepared for duplication and release).

=== Story ===
While the trilogy focused on Lara maturing and becoming more powerful, Shadow explored her inner struggles to maintain her morality. Unlike previous games, in which Lara is thrust into dangerous situations, she takes a proactive role in this entry and must face the consequences of her actions. Bisson added that Lara was "overconfident," and that this personality flaw caused her to make mistakes. The opening set piece in Mexico was described by Eidos as the game's "benchmark scenes," as it set the tone and showed that Lara's reckless actions resulted in significant casualties. The destruction Lara unleashes when claiming a key artifact was designed as an inversion of the traditional Tomb Raider approach, helping to subvert players' expectations. Jonah had a larger presence in Shadow compared to his previous appearances. As Shadow featured a personal story for Lara, Jonah served as her moral compass, challenging her views and reminding her of the human cost of her quest for revenge. Jill Murray, the lead writer, noted that "there's a kind of desperation, a kind of panic, and kind of anger that goes into some of Lara's actions in the game." Throughout the story, Lara must learn to overcome her guilt and align with her own principles. While her motivations are selfish at the beginning of the game, she ultimately becomes a more selfless person over the course of the narrative. Camilla Luddington and Earl Baylon reprised their roles, providing voice and motion capture for Lara and Jonah.

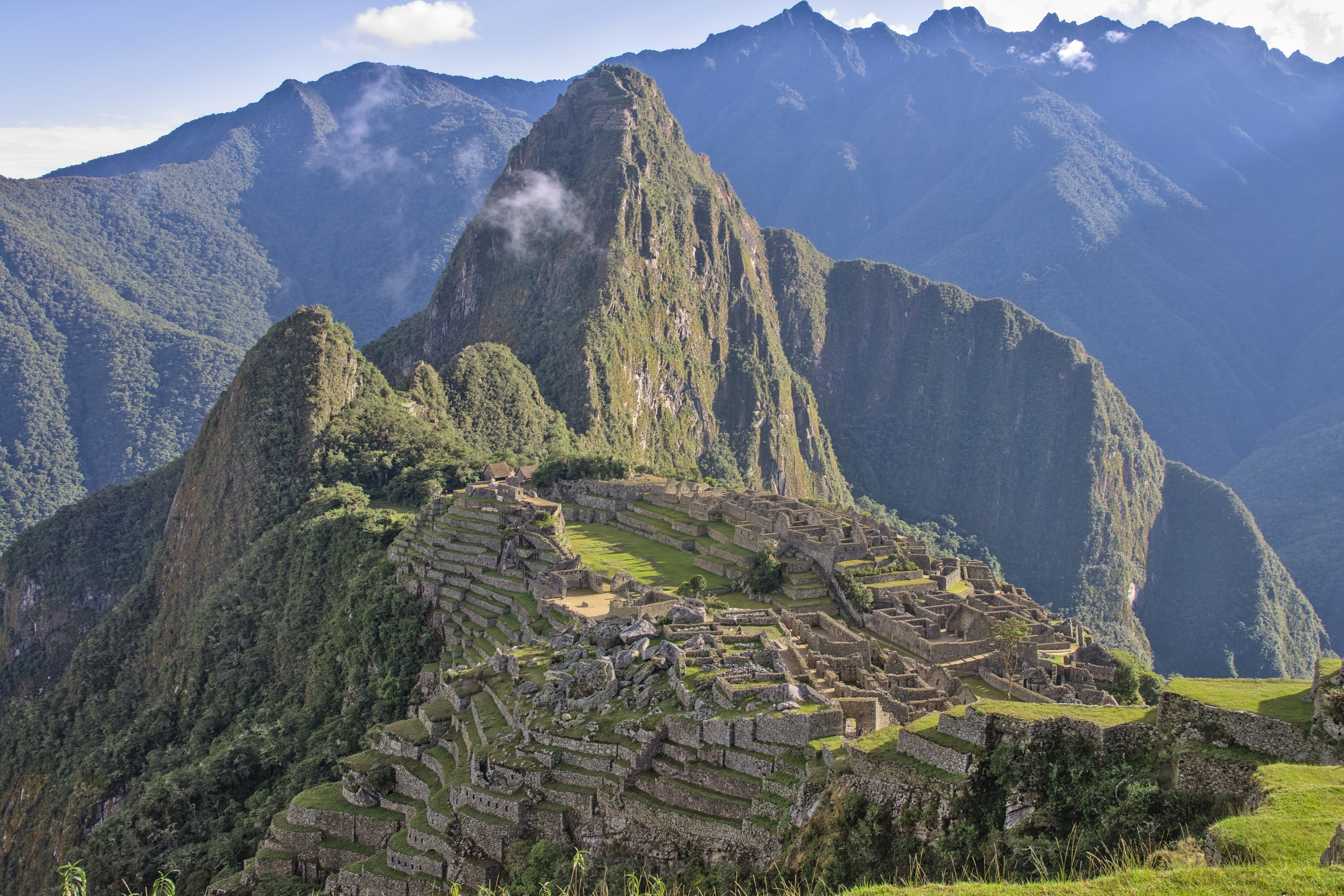
Eidos sent a team to visit Machu Picchu to better understand Incan architecture.

According to Bisson, Lara was "awkward" around people. The large hub world of Paititi was designed as a "celebration of life," where she can learn to make more human contact, trust her allies, and complete side quests to help the populace. Narrative director Jason Dozois noted that these introspective scenes helped "create more of a person rather than just a super athlete who was always getting in and out of horrible situations". During the initial design pitch, the team wanted Lara to discover a real lost tomb with a living population, a concept previously limited by the technology available at the time. Their research led them to choose Paititi due to its historical precedent over purely fictional locations like El Dorado. The setting and narrative also took inspiration from Mayan, Aztec and Incan mythology. To ensure cultural accuracy and respect, the team worked with cultural consultation groups and consulted with historians from Yale University to explore how these cultures might have integrated. The team also conducted field trips to Machu Picchu and the Yucatán to better understand ancient architecture. They also studied archeoastronomy, using it as a narrative link for Cozumel and Paititi. Through the game, the team aimed to explore "responsible archaeology", one that fosters an understanding of a culture's customs, people, and language.

=== Gameplay ===
The studio had acted in a support role on the previous entries in the rebooted series, helping with level design and multiplayer in the 2013 reboot, as well as challenge tombs and a quarter of the main single-player campaign for Rise. The levels created by Eidos were rated very highly by playtesters, which gave Crystal Dynamics the confidence to pass the franchise to Eidos-Montréal. Similar to their work on the Deus Ex series and Thief, Eidos-Montréal first gained a deep understanding of the series' basic elements, then set about building the game using both previous entries and their own design philosophies. The two teams felt that traversal, combat, and puzzles were the three pillars of the franchise, and the game was designed to split focus evenly between these segments. The team added more tombs and puzzles to the game, as they were identified as the most common player requests. Tombs were spread across the main critical path and side objectives. Bisson aimed to make these tombs "dark," "brutal," and "scary," wanting most puzzles to feature a twist that would upset the player's expectations. The environments were also designed to be more lethal, filled with traps that can kill Lara instantly. These tombs featured an elaborate design intended to showcase Lara's competency.

One of the core narrative themes was "fear." The team sought to contrast the fear a player experiences while navigating dangerous tombs with the fear Lara inflicts upon her enemies during combat. To achieve this, they gave the player significant control over combat engagements, allowing them to retreat into stealth or use hallucinogenic arrows to manipulate the enemies' artificial intelligence (AI). While the team initially developed a "fear meter" that filled as Lara terrified her foes, it was scrapped for being too intangible. Instead, drawing inspiration from Predator and Alien, they focused on making the enemies' terror and panic visible on-screen. Additionally, stealth game mechanics were prioritized. Players can use the environments to gain tactical advantages over their enemies. For instance, players can traverse the canopy, which adds an extra layer of verticality. Inspired by older games in the series, players were encouraged to stay on the move. To achieve this, the team replaced stationary "mud pits" with a camouflage system that can be used anytime during combat. Dozois described Lara as an "apex predator," with combat prioritizing repositioning to allow her to blend back into the environment shortly after striking enemies. Despite this, Shadow was still designed to be a challenging experience, as the team felt that players would not feel fear if the game were too easy. Movement and traversal mechanics were also expanded to provide players with more control.

South American jungles were chosen as the game's main setting because the team felt they provided a clear visual contrast with those from its predecessors. They also believed it was one of the "deadliest environments" in the world. While initially designed to be "dark" and "bleak," the team eventually decided to make the setting more colorful. The developers perceived the game's world as a "character" in its own right, requiring players to overcome treacherous environments and dangerous wildlife to uncover its secrets. Early combat encounters serve as an introduction to Lara's abilities, which are then utilized against more formidable foes in later sections. Bisson noted that as players progress, the jungle becomes less hostile and more welcoming, reflecting that they have mastered the environment and "[become] a part of that world". Underwater exploration was included to bring Lara's moveset closer to that of the classic games. These sections were designed to be "claustrophobic", similar to the cenotes in Mexico. The team viewed National Geographic videos of scuba diving while creating these segments.

The music for Shadow of the Tomb Raider was composed by Brian D'Oliveira. While following the musical styles established since the 2013 reboot, the team added new esthetic elements, incorporating the local culture and the darker portrayal of both Lara and her mission. D'Oliveira was selected due to his ability with South American instruments, and during recording at his Montreal studios worked with native musicians to achieve the right sound for each location. Martin Stig Andersen worked as Ambient Sound Designer, who focused on the sound transition for underwater segments. The team brought back "The Instrument", a specially designed percussion instrument created for the 2013 reboot's soundtrack by Matt McConnell. "The Instrument" was used to help convey the primal aspects of Lara's character, in addition to referencing her adventure on Yamatai in the 2013 game.

== Release ==
The existence of the game was first leaked in October 2016, when a Reddit user took a photo of a passenger working on marketing materials for the game on a train in Montreal. Square Enix confirmed that a sequel to Rise of the Tomb Raider was in development in December 2017. The title was officially revealed in March 2018, with the game being marketed as the "climatic finale of Lara's origin story". The game had a marketing and promotion budget of $35 million. It had a large presence at San Diego Comic-Con 2018, where participants could play a demo of the game and interact with animals such as anacondas, scorpions, silkworms, and water beetles. It was released on September 14, 2018, for PlayStation 4, Windows, and Xbox One. The Windows version was developed by Nixxes Software, who had worked on several earlier Tomb Raider games for the platform. In addition to the standard version of the game, players can purchase the "Croft Steelbook Edition", which added several in-game weapons and outfits, 48-hour early access and a steelbook, and the "Ultimate Edition", which included everything from the "Croft Steelbook Edition" alongside physical items including a statue of Lara Croft, a flashlight, and a bottle opener. A patch was released on launch day because the game accidentally shipped with an ending that tied more closely to the 1996 original. A representative from Square Enix explained that the team had created multiple post-credit scenes, noting that "one of the directions that was considered, but not chosen, was mistakenly included in the game". A free trial that allows players to experience the first level of the game was released in December 2018.

A season pass gives players access to seven downloadable content (DLC) packs with each introducing new side missions, tombs, weapons, outfits and skills. None of these packs contain additional story content, as the narrative was complete with the base release. Cooperative multiplayer was also introduced, allowing two players to complete challenge tombs together. A version bundling together the main game and DLC, Shadow of the Tomb Raider: Definitive Edition, was also released on November 4. The Definitive Edition was ported to Linux and macOS by Feral Interactive on November 5, 2019, and to Stadia on November 19 as part of the platform's launch line-up. In July 2021, an update that improved performance and allowed the game to run in 4K at 60 frames per second on the PlayStation 5 and Xbox Series X/S was released for the PlayStation 4 and Xbox One versions of the game. Aspyr later developed and published the Nintendo Switch 2 port of the Definitive Edition, which was released on October 22, 2026.

Shadow of the Tomb Raider was the last Tomb Raider game published by Square Enix, as the rights to the franchise's intellectual property were sold to Embracer Group in May 2022. Amazon Games is set to publish the next mainline Tomb Raider game, titled Tomb Raider Catalyst, in 2027.

=== Related media ===
In a joint co-production between Netflix and Legendary Entertainment, an anime-style series adaptation based on the video game reboot franchise was in the works, titled Tomb Raider: The Legend of Lara Croft. The series is set after the events of Shadow of the Tomb Raider and bridges the gap between the reboot trilogy and the original series of games. The first season of Tomb Raider: The Legend of Lara Croft premiered on Netflix on October 10, 2024.

== Reception ==
=== Critical response ===
Reception

Aggregate score
Aggregator	Score
Metacritic	PC: 77/100; PS4: 75/100; XONE: 82/100

Review scores
Publication	Score
Game Informer	7.5/10
GameSpot	6/10
GamesRadar+	4/5
IGN	9/10
PC Gamer (US)	84/100
The Guardian	3/5
VentureBeat	84/100
The Daily Telegraph	2/5

Shadow of the Tomb Raider received "generally favorable" reviews from critics, according to review aggregator website Metacritic. However, it saw less critical success than the earlier games in the trilogy.

Andy Kelly from PC Gamer praised the improved stealth mechanics for allowing players to use multiple ways to manipulate enemy AI to their advantage. He compared Lara's fighting style to those of Batman and the Predators. Nicole Carpenter, writing for Variety, praised the upgrades and added that a stealthy approach to combat provided a rewarding challenge. Eurogamer's Aoife Wilson enjoyed the game's renewed emphasis on stealth, and remarked that these sections "treat open-world combat almost like a deadly puzzle". Edmond Tran from GameSpot, however, criticized it for being simple, noting it could be clumsy and unrefined. While critics generally praised the game for allowing players to individually adjust the difficulty of different gameplay elements, Ben Kuchera from Polygon criticized the game for overtutorializing its gameplay systems. He added that the game often pushed the player toward a specific playstyle and lacked "a lot of patience" for gameplay experimentation.

The game's prioritization of exploration and puzzle-solving was praised as a step in the right direction for the franchise. Sam Byford from The Verge described the pacing as "excellent," noting that it "skewed less toward combat than ever" with "fewer forced gun battles". Several critics remarked that Shadow had the most sophisticated puzzles in the series. Kelly praised the design of the tombs, adding that the game successfully conveyed "a sense of place and scale." While he felt the puzzles were never overly difficult, solving them remained highly satisfying. Lucy O'Brien from IGN liked the expanded traversal options, such as the new overhang and rappel abilities, for providing more complexity and diversity to the gameplay. Kimberly Wallace from Game Informer also highlighted the significant role of traversal tools in solving puzzles. While Tran strongly praised the game's level design, he felt that the platforming gameplay was imprecise.

Wilson praised the open-endedness of the levels and described the jungles as a "gorgeous backdrop". Olivia White from The Daily Telegraph wrote that the game's structure did not fully support many of its gameplay elements, such as crafting and role-playing progression, and that newly acquired upgrades often had little to no use. Rachel Weber from GamesRadar also wrote that the implementation of these mechanics were restrictive given the game's linear design. The hub world of Paititi was praised by O'Brien for feeling like a "real, lived-in city." However, she found the activities in these areas unremarkable and the side quests unimaginative in their design. Tran also criticized the abundance of collectibles for making the experience exhausting. Several reviewers praised Eidos' world-building efforts, noting that wandering through the hub worlds provided a welcome change of pace. Critics generally lauded the game's production value, with O'Brien specifically praising the set pieces and action sequences, describing them as "wonderfully orchestrated roller-coaster rides".

O'Brien praised Lara's character development, considering it an improvement over its predecessors and a moving conclusion to the Survivor trilogy. Wallace found the exploration of Lara's unresolved trauma interesting, though he considered the ending underwhelming. Wilson wrote that the narrative often fell back on familiar tropes despite promising a darker, more mature tone. Keza MacDonald from The Guardian described the story as an "incoherent mess" filled with "narrative inconsistencies", while White called it "incomprehensible". Lara's characterization was criticized. White wrote that she behaved like a "whiny, bratty child", Tran found her difficult to empathize with, and Wilson argued that Eidos failed to make this iteration of Lara likable or relatable, adding that Shadow featured a "contrived revenge story that no one asked for" with no moments of levity. Several critics noted that the game's violent gameplay did not mesh with a story attempting to depict Lara as a flawed, human character. Furthermore, some reviewers criticized Lara's actions in the game as being neocolonialist in nature. Byford concluded that the lack of gameplay innovation and a subpar story made it a disappointing entry in the series.

=== Sales ===
Upon release, Shadow of the Tomb Raider got off to a slow start in sales, attributed by Square Enix president Yosuke Matsuda to a lack of originality compared to other titles at the time. In the United Kingdom, it was the second best-selling game of the week behind Marvel's Spider-Man. Its first-week sales were 25% higher than those of Rise of the Tomb Raider, but 70% lower than the 2013 reboot. In the United States, the game was the fifth best-selling title in September 2018. By the end of December 2018, the game shipped 4.12 million units. While it saw lower sales than many other titles of that year, Eidos-Montréal was satisfied with its sales as well as its critical reception, prompting them to produce the DLC episodes. By December 2021, it had sold 8.9 million units.

=== Accolades ===
Year	Award	Category	Result	Ref.
2018	Game Critics Awards	Best Action/Adventure Game	Nominated	
2018	Golden Joystick Awards	Best Audio Design	Nominated	
2018	The Game Awards	Best Action/Adventure	Nominated	
2018	Gamers' Choice Awards	Fan Favorite Character of the Year (Lara Croft)	Nominated	
2018	Gamers' Choice Awards	Fan Favorite Female Voice Actor (Camilla Luddington)	Won	
2019	Annie Awards	Character Animation in a Video Game	Nominated	
2019	22nd Annual D.I.C.E. Awards	Action Game of the Year	Nominated	
2019	17th Game Audio Network Guild Awards	Audio of the Year	Nominated	
2019	17th Game Audio Network Guild Awards	Sound Design of the Year	Nominated	
2019	17th Game Audio Network Guild Awards	Best Original Soundtrack Album	Won	
2019	17th Game Audio Network Guild Awards	Best Interactive Score	Won	
2019	17th Game Audio Network Guild Awards	Best Cinematic Cutscene Audio	Nominated	
2019	Italian Video Game Awards	People's Choice	Nominated	
