= Solar Eclipse (video game) =

1995 video game

Solar Eclipse Titan Wars
- North American Saturn box art
- Developer: Crystal Dynamics
- Publisher: Crystal Dynamics
- Platforms: Sega Saturn, PlayStation
- Release: Saturn: NA: November 27, 1995; EU: April 12, 1996; PlayStation: EU: November 15, 1996
- Genre: Space flight simulation
- Mode: Single-player

Solar Eclipse is a 1995 space flight simulation video game developed and published by Crystal Dynamics, released initially for the Sega Saturn in North America, Europe and Japan.

Solar Eclipse was developed under the title Titan, but the American marketing team decided it would sell better if published as a sequel to the 1995 video game Total Eclipse, especially as the two featured similar gameplay and graphical style. In Japan and Europe, it was released as Titan Wars.

== Gameplay ==
Solar Eclipse is a hybrid of rail shooter and space combat simulation; the general direction of the ship's flight is locked in, but the player may maneuver a substantial area, and can at certain points choose from multiple routes.

== Development ==
The game was developed in 16 months.

== Reception ==
Reception

Review scores
Publication	Score
The San Francisco Examiner	B
The Charlotte Observer	3/5

The four reviewers of Electronic Gaming Monthly gave the Saturn version a 7.75 out of 10 average. They praised the intense gameplay, the considerable strategy required to elude enemy fire, and the solid graphics. GamePro's Captain Squideo had a more mixed reaction, criticizing the partially on-rails flight and saying the landscapes and enemies become repetitious. He concluded that the game is nonetheless fun to play and "eclipses most other shooters", but that these problems would discourage repeat plays.
