= Pandemonium 2 =

1997 video game

- Developer: Crystal Dynamics
- Publishers: NA: Midway Games; EU: Crystal Dynamics (PS); EU: Ubi Soft (PC)
- Producers: Caroline Esmurdoc; Sam Player
- Designer: Zak Krefting
- Programmer: Andrew Lacey
- Artist: Leon Cannon
- Composer: Burke Trieschmann
- Platforms: PlayStation, Windows
- Release: PlayStation: NA: October 23, 1997; EU: November 5, 1997; Windows: NA: September 22, 1997; EU: 1998
- Genre: Platform
- Mode: Single-player

Pandemonium 2 (Note: Known in Japan as Magical Jumpers (マジカルジャンパーズ)) is a platform game developed and published by Crystal Dynamics for PlayStation and Microsoft Windows. It is the sequel to Pandemonium!.

== Gameplay ==
Pandemonium 2 is a psychedelic 2.5D game; specifically, it renders characters and environments with polygons and uses a 3D camera to create the appearance of 3-D, while gameplay is actually on a 2-D plane. Players can choose to be either Nikki or Fargus - who each have different specialties - with the option to change for each level. The player characters' abilities have been expanded over those in Pandemonium! with the ability to climb ropes, crawl, and pull themselves up ledges. During the quest, players can earn extra lives by collecting treasure.

Unique powers collected during gameplay may replace, extend or add to previous powers, depending on which character is in play and which power has been obtained. The characters handle the unique powers differently. For instance, collecting the "fire power" allows Nikki to shoot destructive fireballs, while it grants Fargus invincibility and a deadly touch, but requires him to constantly move forward. Machines and equipment are also available throughout the game, although they are tied to certain areas.

There are four boss stages, set after a block of stages has been completed. Destroying the bosses usually involves small puzzles, such as catapulting fireballs at a flying boss, or surviving the onslaught of a giant mecha boss while balanced on the back of a large, fast-moving tank.

Should the player collect +80% of treasure in a level, they will have access to the bonus level "Boarder Run", where they must slide along a course collecting treasure, while simultaneously keeping ahead of a pursuing vortex. Failure in "Boarder Run" does not cost the player lives; successfully completing "Boarder Run" will result in the player earning at least one extra life.

The player begins with four hit points to represent health. Through bonuses, this can be expanded up to a maximum of 16. To achieve maximum hit points, the player must find one of several "life pieces" in hidden areas of the game. When all points are lost, the character loses a life and returns to the last checkpoint. When all lives are lost, the game is over.

== Plot ==
When the magic-infused "Comet of Infinite Possibilities" is about to pass over Lyr for the first time in 300 years, the inhabitants race to reach the comet in order to make a wish on its powers. Nikki (voiced by Deborah Ben-Eliezer), a sassy sorceress, decides that stealing the source of its magic is a quicker way to reach power than study. Her bosom buddy, Fargus (voiced by Martin Ganapoler), a court jester, has gone insane over the years and has a simple plan to "touch pretty fire" upon reaching the comet. Sid (also voiced by Martin Ganapoler), a sharp-tongued head on a stick and Fargus's only other "friend", wishes to get rid of Fargus and get closer to Nikki. But the evil Goon Queen Zorrscha has her sights set on the comet as well. Nikki and Fargus must make it to the comet before she does, lest she fulfill her own morally questionable wishes.

The ending of the game varies by which character defeats the final boss. If Nikki succeeds in the quest, she gains control of the universe. If Fargus does, he creates a world in which he is the flowers and the trees, as well as the sun, which makes Sid fume to the point where his head explodes.

== Development ==
The game was developed for over a year, and was still being finished in the same October 1997 that it would be released, leading to extensive crunch. Designer Zak Krefting noted an increased difficulty, as his team "tend to build levels that are challenging for them to play", and the surreal landscapes, describing the level "Lick the Toad" as "If you took DNA from Dali, Escher, and Picasso".

== Reception ==
Reception

Aggregate score
| Aggregator | Score |
|---|---|
| GameRankings | 77% (PS1) |

Review scores
| Publication | Score |
|---|---|
| Electronic Gaming Monthly | 8.0/10 (PS1) |
| GameSpot | 7.3/10 (PS1) |

Reviews for Pandemonium 2 ranged from mixed to positive. The PlayStation version received an average score of 77.11% at GameRankings, based on an aggregate of 9 reviews. Most reviewers found the game had more detailed graphics than the original Pandemonium!, as well as being generally more colorful. GameSpot's Lauren Fielder summarized that Pandemonium 2 is "a fun and mostly unpredictable platform game, in spite of not being fully 3D." GamePro was more critical of the 2D platforming gameplay, deeming it a niche subgenre which had become "very tiresome". The reviewer nonetheless praised the graphics and soundtrack, and said the game was recommended to the few remaining fans of 2D platformers. The four reviewers of Electronic Gaming Monthly, by contrast, criticized the cinemas but unanimously applauded the gameplay due to its innovative stage design, balanced challenge, and exciting camera panning.

The redesign of the characters was negatively received; in particular, the transformation of Nikki from the adolescent tomboy portrayed in the original Pandemonium! into a sultry seductress was seen as an embarrassing effort to appeal to the young male population which dominated the video game market. In their Buyer's Guide Electronic Gaming Monthly gave Nikki the 1997 "Worst Makeover" award, deriding the effort to make Nikki sexier as both transparent and ineffectual: "We're sorry, but we have a hard time getting excited about a heroine who looks as if she spends her Friday nights getting hit on by league bowlers."
