= Pandemonium! (video game) =

1996 video game

- European PS1 box art
- Developer: Toys for Bob (Note: Ported to Saturn by Jumpin Jack Software; Ported to N-Gage and Mobile by Ideaworks3D; Ported to iOS by Eidos Interactive.)
- Publisher: Crystal Dynamics; Eidos Interactive (NGE); Electronic Arts (iOS): JP: Bandai (PS/SS)
- Producer: Mark Lawrence
- Designer: Paul Reiche III
- Programmers: Ken Ford; Fred Ford
- Artist: Steve Kongsle
- Writers: Paul Jenkins; Ken Daly; Ed Crasnick; Paul Reiche III
- Composer: Burke Trieschmann
- Platforms: PlayStation, Sega Saturn, Microsoft Windows, N-Gage, Mobile, iOS
- Release: November 5, 1996: PlayStation; NA: November 5, 1996; EU: December 6, 1996 Sega Saturn; NA: April 24, 1997; EU: June 12, 1997 Microsoft Windows; EU: 1997; NA: June 30, 1997 N-Gage; NA: October 6, 2003; EU: October 7, 2003 Mobile; NA: September 12, 2007 iOS; WW: April 24, 2009
- Genre: Platform
- Mode: Single-player

Pandemonium! (Note: Known in Japan as Magical Hoppers (マジカルホッパーズ)) is a 1996 platform video game developed by Toys for Bob and published by Crystal Dynamics for the PlayStation, Sega Saturn, Microsoft Windows, N-Gage, mobile and iOS. Pandemonium! features Fargus, a jester, and Nikki, an acrobat, who unwittingly cast a spell that destroys the town. The goal of the game is to reach the Wishing Engine, where they can wish the town back to normal. For each level, the player can choose which character to be. Each has a special move – Fargus can deliver a special spinning attack, and Nikki can double jump. The game consists of a great variety of unique gameplay objects, such as watermelons, clouds, spider webs and logs. A sequel, Pandemonium 2 (Miracle Jumpers in Japan), was released in 1997 for PlayStation and Microsoft Windows.

== Gameplay ==
Pandemonium! employs 2.5D gameplay; while the game renders polygons in a typical 3D fashion, gameplay is 2D. The area of gameplay is as a two-dimensional surface twisting and bending in a three-dimensional world. Occasionally, this surface will overlap itself. There are segments where the path branches, allowing the player to choose their course.

Enemies are generally defeated through the usual platform jumping method of bouncing on the enemy's head. There are power-ups located in each level, with varying effects. One is a freeze ray which turns enemies into ice, while another is a shrink ray which reduces the size of enemies to the point where the player character can step on them.

== Plot ==
In the land of Lyr, an unpopular carnival jester called Fargus, and his stick-puppet Sid, are seeking a new career. Meanwhile, a talented acrobat named Nikki, bored of carnival life, runs away to pursue her dream of being a wizard. Fargus, Sid, and Nikki meet at a "Wizards in Training" seminar at Lancelot Castle. The seminar turns out to be rather boring, so during a break Nikki and Fargus steal the speaker's spellbook and take it to the high balcony overlooking the village.

When Nikki begins practicing with the magical book, Fargus and Sid urge her to perform a 10th level spell. With a few magical words, a green monster called Yungo appears and consumes the entire village. They search the book for how to get rid of the monster. The book reveals that they'll have to obtain a wish from the Wishing Engine. With a map from the book to help them, they set off on their journey.

When they find the Wishing Engine, it tells them to speak three wishes. Fargus wastes the first wish on a chicken (he claims it was just to see if it works) and Nikki then wishes that the village was returned to as it was before the spell was cast. Nikki and Fargus are then teleported back to the top of Lancelot Castle. Yungo spits out the village and is pulled back into his own dimension. Nikki ponders what happened to their third wish, and Fargus guiltily admits that out of desire to share his joy with the world, he wished that everyone back home could be just like him, inadvertently turning everyone in the village into Fargus clones. Nikki and Fargus resign themselves to another trip to the Wishing Engine.

== Development and release ==
Work on Pandemonium! began in December 1994, starting with two months spent on learning the dynamics of 3D games. The team concentrated on building a prototype level to demonstrate at Electronic Entertainment Expo 1995. Once this was done, set designers and artists were brought on to help create the bulk of the game, bringing the development team up to 30 people. Early in development it was planned to record hundreds of one-liners for the player characters, similar to the earlier Crystal Dynamics game Gex.

According to lead designer Paul Reiche III, at the beginning of June 1996 the team decided they wanted the game to be released before Thanksgiving Day of that year and shifted into "high gear mode". The last 2–3 months of development were devoted to fine-tuning, balancing, and bug-fixing, in particular adjusting the level of detail on levels so as to maintain a consistent frame rate of 30 frames per second.

Having decided to step down as a publisher and focus on development, Crystal Dynamics sold the publication rights for Pandemonium! to Electronic Arts once the game was finished. As usual for Crystal Dynamics games, the European publishing rights were given to BMG Interactive. However, BMG decided against publishing the Saturn version, so Sega of Europe purchased the rights from BMG and published that version. The Saturn EU release date was originally slated for May 1997, but was pushed back to June so that a bug could be fixed.

The Saturn, PlayStation and PC versions have 18 levels, while the N-Gage version has 11. In the PlayStation and Saturn versions, progress is saved using a password system. The Japanese version of the game, called Magical Hoppers, has considerable changes to the story, characters and cutscenes and is distributed by Bandai.

The PlayStation version was released to the PlayStation Store on October 8, 2009.

== Reception ==
Reception

Aggregate score
Aggregator	Score
GameRankings	71% (PS); 59% (N-G)

Review scores
Publication	Score
Computer and Video Games	3/5 (PS); 3/5 (SAT)
Edge	7/10 (PS)
Electronic Gaming Monthly	8.375/10 (PS); 8.25/10 (SAT)
GameSpot	4.4/10 (N-G); 7.6/10 (PC); 5.4/10 (PS)
IGN	6.6/10 (N-G); 6/10 (PS)
Next Generation	3/5 (PS)
PlayStation Official Magazine – UK	9/10 (PS)
PC Games (DE)	91% (PC)
PC Zone	80/100 (PC)
Saturn Power	88/100 (SAT)
Sega Saturn Magazine	90% (SAT)

The PlayStation version of Pandemonium received mixed to positive reviews. Critics generally said that while the gameplay is essentially 2D, the open, airy graphic designs and the exceptional camerawork make it easy for players to be caught in an illusion of 3D. Most found that the gameplay was lacking in innovation, though the diverse and surprising level designs made it enjoyable and relatively fresh. Some critics complained that the "boing" sound which accompanies each jump is annoying. GamePro concluded the game to be a mixed bag, and advised gamers to rent it to determine if it fits their interests. Dan Hsu of Electronic Gaming Monthly felt it had little to offer besides the graphics, but the other three members of the review team were much more enthusiastic, saying they particularly enjoyed searching out the levels' secrets. GameSpot gave it a largely negative review, arguing that the level design is flawed and the two playable characters are not differentiated enough. They criticized Burke Tresichmann's music for having tracks which are too juvenile and/or similar to his scores for The Horde and Captain Quazar. However, GamePro and Sushi-X of Electronic Gaming Monthly opined that the music was both well-done and consistently suited the tone. Next Generation summarized that "while Pandemonium keeps the player on rails, it's still an enjoyable and extremely colorful ride."

The Saturn version was also well-received, as critics agreed that despite the half a year that had passed since the game's release on PlayStation, it still held up well. Sega Saturn Magazine and Saturn Power both deemed it the first truly outstanding platform game for the Saturn. GamePro said that "It breaks little new ground beyond the cool perspectives, but the gameplay's meaty enough to hold your interest." Sushi-X of Electronic Gaming Monthly said it "is a step above its PlayStation sibling", citing tighter controls. However, his co-reviewer Shawn Smith and GamePro both felt the PlayStation version was better, due to the port's slight decrease in graphical quality, though critics unanimously agreed that Crystal Dynamics had done an overall exemplary job of optimizing the game for the Saturn.

In January 1997, German magazine MAN!AC ranked Pandemonium! second in its "Jump 'n' Run" category for games released in 1996, behind Nights into Dreams and ahead of Crash Bandicoot.
