= Total Eclipse (1994 video game) =

- Developer: Crystal Dynamics
- Publisher: Crystal Dynamics
- Producer: Jon Horsley
- Composer: Burke Trieschmann
- Platforms: 3DO, PlayStation
- Release: 3DO: NA: January 8, 1994; JP: March 26, 1994; EU: September 1, 1994; PlayStation: NA: August 30, 1995; EU: November 12, 1995
- Genre: Space flight simulation
- Mode: Single-player

Total Eclipse is a space flight simulation video game developed and published by Crystal Dynamics for 3DO. It was later ported to the PlayStation under the title Total Eclipse Turbo. The game was copyrighted in 1993 and released 1994. Total Eclipse Turbo was a launch title for the PlayStation in the U.S., with the game's released date predating the North American console launch by 11 days. A sequel, Solar Eclipse, was released for Sega Saturn and PlayStation.

== Gameplay ==

Top: Planetary surface segment.
Bottom: Tunnel segment.
(3DO version shown)

The game is played in a third-person perspective as the player's ship flies across each stage. The player is free to accelerate, decelerate, and maneuver around to dodge obstacles and attack enemies, but the course for each stage is fixed.

Rather than space, the player's ship flies over planetary surfaces and through tunnels. On the surface, the player flies over 3D heightmapped terrain, avoiding mountains and obstacles. In tunnels, the player avoids mechanical traps such as large moving doors and twisting passageways. The exit of the tunnel appears later on the surface of the same stage, so the player may miss a power-up (or a challenge) on the surface by taking a tunnel and vice versa. Some tunnels are optional and may contain bonus power-ups, while other tunnels are entered at dead ends on the surface. If the player fails to properly guide his ship into the tunnel at that point, his ship collides with the dead end terrain and explodes, costing a life.

Colliding with enemies or terrain, being shot by enemies, and the passage of time all drain the ship's shields. When the shields reach zero, the ship explodes, a life is deducted from the player's stock, and play resumes at a checkpoint. Since there are very few shield refills in the game, the only way to avert this is by destroying enemies and ground installations; upon doing so the player's ship automatically absorbs their power to replenish its shields. Extra lives may be earned by collecting 1-ups and scoring large numbers of points. In addition, the player has a limited supply of continues, which place them back at the beginning of the current stage. When all lives and continues are exhausted, the game is over.

Each game world is divided into four stages, for a total of 20 stages. Each stage contains multiple surface and tunnel areas. The fourth stage of each world ends with a fight against a boss, with the exception of the final world, in which the boss appears midway through the stage.

By collecting power-ups, the player can change their weapon between five different types. Collecting a power-up of the type they already have upgrades their weapon level, with a maximum level of three. At higher levels the weapon fires more shots at a time. The player can also use bombs which send a wave of energy across the stage. This wave is strong enough to destroy most enemies and installations, and stops when it reaches the game's draw distance. The player starts each life with one bomb, and can collect more within the stages, maintaining a stock of up to three.

The player can score additional points by performing aileron rolls, collecting point bonus items, and flying at faster speeds.

== Plot ==
Earth is attacked by an aggressive alien race known as the Drak-Sai. The aliens use their powerful weapon, the Sun Dagger, to initiate a supernova in the sun. The player must pilot their ship across four planets and ultimately destroy the Sun Dagger to prevent further destruction.

== Reception ==
Reception

Review scores
Publication	Score	
Publication	3DO	PS
AllGame	3.5/5	
Electronic Gaming Monthly	7/10, 6/10, 7/10, 6/10	5.6/10
Famitsu	7/10, 6/10, 6/10, 6/10	
Next Generation		2/5

Electronic Gaming Monthly praised the graphics of the 3DO version, but criticized that the controls are too sensitive, the music is inappropriate for the theme of some stages, and that the hit detection is overly punishing. GamePro were held in similar awe of the graphics in the 3DO version and found little to complain about with the gameplay, concluding, "Total Eclipse blasts off into familiar fighting space ways, but the graphic look of this cool shooter is truly out of this world."

Reviews for the PlayStation version were less positive, as critics commented that despite the "Turbo" in the title, the PlayStation version made almost no changes to the by-then over a year old game. Bob Mackey of USgamer listed Total Eclipse Turbo as one of the worst launch games for the PlayStation.
