= Off-World Interceptor =

1994 video game

- Developer: Crystal Dynamics
- Publisher: Crystal Dynamics
- Platforms: 3DO, Sega Saturn, PlayStation
- Release: 3DO: NA: c. November 1994; EU: November 1994; Sega Saturn: NA: 1995; EU: November 1995; PlayStation: NA: September 10, 1995; EU: November 15, 1995
- Genres: Racing, vehicular combat
- Modes: Single-player, multiplayer

Off-World Interceptor is a 1994 third-person vehicular combat video game, developed and published by Crystal Dynamics and originally released on 3DO. An alternate version of the game was later released for the Sega Saturn and PlayStation consoles, named Off-World Interceptor Extreme. The two versions of the game have identical core gameplay elements, though the Extreme version is tweaked to feel more like the arcade mode in the original Off-World Interceptor.

== Gameplay ==
3DO Interactive Multiplayer version screenshot.

Off-World Interceptor is a rail-based off-road vehicular combat game, giving the player the ability to drive (and in some cases, fly) anywhere he so chooses. The player takes the role of a "trashman", a bounty hunter who chases after fugitives in order to earn money. A core element of the game is that the player's car can navigate unrealistically steep slopes, and can move infinitely to the left or right of the environment. The car itself is not explicitly locked to a rail, though the player cannot turn around or back up. Every car is armed with jump jets, devices that allow the car to both jump and fly, and all cars can pitch up or down for aiming purposes.

There are a total of six cars in Off-World Interceptor, each with its own unique attributes and abilities. Each one has five attributes, all of which can be upgraded. The most common enemies in the game are the "Cash Cops", mercenary-like enemies similar to the player character, and stronger variations of each general enemy are encountered within each passing level. To eliminate enemies, each car is equipped with its own unique weapon, which can be powered up for a different effect, as well as a limited number of guided missiles, plasma mines, and airstrikes (which do severe damage to every enemy on screen). The player also carries a limited number of nitros, which when used give the car a burst of high speed for several seconds; this allows the player to both race past difficult parts and complete the level faster. Each level includes objects native to the environment, such as trees and boulders. While posing as a driving hazard to the player, they do not do any actual damage.

The game is divided into six levels, each with multiple stages. The objective in each stage is to get from the beginning of the level to the finish line. Each stage is populated by various objects and enemies that are relative to the environment. The player is given the opportunity to pick up items within the level, such as missiles, nitros, airstrikes, fuel cans, wrenches (health refills), clones (extra lives), and money to purchase upgrades for their car. After so many stages, the player fights an end level boss. Defeating a boss awards the player a bounty, which is a sum of money much larger than can be acquired from level pickups. Should the player take too long in any stage, including boss stages, the criminal that is being pursued escapes from the area and an air-strike is called in. The air-strike obliterates everything in the level, including the player. Before each stage, the player visits the repair shop, where they can purchase items, a new vehicle, or upgrades to the current vehicle.

In arcade mode, the player is given the ability to play on any level he or she desires, except for the final level. All vehicles in arcade mode are equal in price and attributes, giving the player the ability to purchase the car he desires rather than needs (unlike in story mode). Battle mode is a two player deathmatch mode. A level is selected and the players choose their cars. Upon entering the level, the goal is to eliminate the other player on the track. Training mode is only found in the alternate version of Off-World Interceptor, Off-World Interceptor Extreme. In this mode, a random level is chosen, and the player is given the ability to drive through the stage without interference from enemies.

== Development ==
The game was developed under the title Orion Off-Road.

== Reception ==
Reception

Review scores
Publication	Score
AllGame	2.5/5 (3DO)
Edge	7/10 (3DO)
Electronic Gaming Monthly	7.4/10 (3DO)
Next Generation	3/5 (3DO, SAT)
Sega Saturn Magazine	65% (SAT)
3DO Magazine	5/5 (3DO)
Power Unlimited	91% (PS)

Off-World Interceptor received mostly mixed reviews. Reviewing the 3DO version, Sarah Nade of GamePro criticized the music and "slightly hokey" sound effects, but praised the graphics and cutscenes, and concluded "Once any early frustration wears off, OWI's great graphics and game play will drive you wild." Electronic Gaming Monthly's Mike Weigand commented, "The unusual perspective takes some time getting used to, but the graphics and sound effects really show off the 3DO capabilities." A reviewer for Next Generation said of the gameplay that "It's a little more fast and furious than usual, and addictive in a mindless way, but nothing you haven't seen before." However, he felt that the Mystery Science Theater 3000-style commentators were effectively funny and added freshness and originality to the game.

Reviewing the Saturn version, Rob Bright of Sega Saturn Magazine commented that the game's premise is interesting but the actual gameplay is poor, especially the "unrealistic" movements of the player's vehicle. A reviewer for Next Generation argued that the inclusion of futuristic action makes the already exciting genre of off-road racing more interesting, and that the bizarre physics of the game come to feel perfectly natural. He nonetheless concluded that "OWI is a solid action game, if not much beyond that." GamePro's The Axe Grinder criticized the split-screen of Battle mode as too confining and the graphics as suffering from slowdown and overcrowded battlefields, but praised the combination of racing and shooting, the accurate controls, and the commentators in the cutscenes. He concluded, "While far from perfect, Off-World Interceptor Extreme provides good thrills and a nice combination of racing and shooting."

Scary Larry of GamePro gave the PlayStation version a positive review. While he criticized the world designs as lacking imagination, he was pleased with the fast pace and absence of slowdown, and felt the high-speed shooting action would appeal to most gamers. Power Unlimited reviewed the PlayStation and gave a score of 91%, they praised the gameplay writing: "Super intense, a pleasure to play."
