= Lara Croft: Tomb Raider – The Cradle of Life =

2003 film by Jan de Bont

- Theatrical release poster
- Directed by: Jan de Bont
- Screenplay by: Dean Georgaris
- Story by: Steven E. de Souza; James V. Hart
- Based on: Tomb Raider by Core Design
- Produced by: Lawrence Gordon; Lloyd Levin
- Starring: Angelina Jolie; Gerard Butler; Noah Taylor; Ciarán Hinds; Djimon Hounsou; Til Schweiger; Christopher Barrie
- Cinematography: David Tattersall
- Edited by: Michael Kahn
- Music by: Alan Silvestri
- Production companies: Mutual Film Company; BBC Films; Tele München Gruppe; Toho-Towa; Lawrence Gordon Productions; Eidos Interactive
- Distributed by: Paramount Pictures (United States and United Kingdom) (Note: Released outside North America through United International Pictures.); Concorde Filmverleih (Germany); Toho-Towa (Japan)
- Release dates: July 21, 2003 (premiere); July 25, 2003 (United States); August 14, 2003 (Germany); August 22, 2003 (United Kingdom); September 20, 2003 (Japan)
- Running time: 117 minutes
- Countries: Germany; Japan; United Kingdom; United States
- Language: English
- Budget: $95 million
- Box office: $160.1 million

Lara Croft: Tomb Raider – The Cradle of Life is a 2003 action adventure film directed by Jan de Bont and written by Dean Georgaris, based on the Tomb Raider video game series by Core Design. Angelina Jolie stars as the title character Lara Croft with supporting performances from Gerard Butler, Ciarán Hinds, Chris Barrie, Noah Taylor, Til Schweiger, Djimon Hounsou, and Simon Yam. An international co-production between the United States, United Kingdom, Germany, Hong Kong and Japan, the film is a sequel to the 2001 film Lara Croft: Tomb Raider and is the second installment in the Tomb Raider film series. The plot centers around Lara Croft as she embarks on a quest to save the mythical Pandora's box while recruiting a former Marine turned mercenary to assist her.

Lara Croft: Tomb Raider – The Cradle of Life was released in the United States on July 25, 2003, by Paramount Pictures. Critics considered it to be better than its predecessor, especially in terms of its action sequences, and continued to praise Jolie's performance. The film did not achieve the same level of box office success as the previous installment, grossing $160.1 million compared to its predecessor's $275 million. Initially, plans were made for a sequel, but these plans were abandoned when Jolie decided not to return as Croft. A reboot of the series, simply titled Tomb Raider, was released in 2018 with Alicia Vikander taking over the title role.

Lara Croft: Tomb Raider – The Cradle of Life also marks the final film directed by De Bont before his retirement in 2012.

== Plot ==
On Santorini island, Greece, a strong earthquake uncovers the Luna Temple. The temple was built by Alexander the Great to house his most prized treasures. Among these treasures is a glowing orb with a pattern resembling a code etched into it. Treasure-hunting archaeologist Lara Croft and her group find this orb but are ambushed by the Lo brothers; Chen and Xien, both of whom are crime lords and leaders of Chinese syndicate Shay Ling. The duo kill the group and take the orb, but Lara escapes with a strange medallion.

MI6 approaches Lara with information about Pandora's box, an object from ancient legends that supposedly contains a deadly plague (the companion to the origin of life itself). The box, hidden in the mysterious Cradle of Life, can only be found with a magical sphere that serves as a map. The sphere is the same orb that was stolen by Chen Lo, who plans to sell it to Dr. Jonathan Reiss, a Nobel Prize-winning scientist and business magnate turned misanthropic bioweapons dealer.

Realising that the sphere must be kept away from Reiss, Lara agrees to help MI6, with the condition that they release her old flame Terry Sheridan, who is familiar with Chen Lo's criminal operation. Together, Lara and Terry infiltrate Chen Lo's lair, where he is smuggling the Terracotta Soldiers. Lara defeats him in a fight and learns that the orb is in Shanghai, China. In Shanghai, she discovers Chen's brother Xien is trying to give the orb to Reiss; however, once Xien hands the orb over, Reiss betrays and executes him, but not before Lara manages to put a tracker on the crate containing the orb.

Lara and Terry manage to find the orb in a lab housed in Hong Kong. However, Lara is captured by Reiss and his men. Reiss reveals his plans to unleash the plague, saving only those people he deems worthy. Helpless and condemned, Lara is saved by Terry and they destroy his computer take the orb before fleeing using wingsuits.

The next day, Lara decodes the orb and learns the location of the mysterious Cradle of Life near Mount Kilimanjaro in the African country of Tanzania. Back at Croft Manor, Lara's assistant Bryce and butler Hillary help Lara with the decoding. Afterwards, they are abducted by Reiss's henchmen who repaired their computer sooner than predicted as they make their way to Africa.

Lara travels to Tanzania where she meets up with her longtime friend Kosa. They question a local tribe about the Cradle of Life, wherein the chief states that the Cradle of Life is in a crater protected by the Shadow Guardians.

As they set out on an expedition the next day, Reiss' mercenary army ambush them and kill the tribesmen. Outnumbered and out of ammunition by the time Reiss' helicopter lands, Lara surrenders. Using Bryce and Hillary as hostages, Reiss forces Lara and Kosa to lead him to the Cradle of Life. At the crater, they encounter the Shadow Guardians that appear in and out of wet patches on dead trees. The creatures kill most of Reiss' men, but Lara manages to find the "keyhole" and drops the Orb in it. The creatures dissolve and the entrance to the Cradle of Life opens.

Lara and Reiss are drawn into the Cradle, a labyrinth made of a strange crystalline substance where normal laws of physics do not apply. Inside, they find a pool of highly corrosive black acid (linking back to one of the myths about Pandora's box), in which the box floats. Terry arrives, frees the hostages, and catches up to Lara.

Lara fights Reiss but he gains the upper hand, and is about to kill her and take the box until Terry distracts him and saves Lara. Lara knocks Reiss down and throws him into the acid pool, which fatally dissolves him. However, Terry announces his intention to take the box for himself. When he refuses to back down, Lara regretfully shoots him dead, replaces the box in the pool and leaves.

In the morning, Lara says goodbye to the villagers and prepares to leave. Watching her friends having their faces colored by African women, she warns them that it's a preparation for a wedding ceremony. Hearing this, her friends escape and leave along with Lara.

== Cast ==
- Angelina Jolie as Lara Croft, an archeologist
- Ciarán Hinds as Dr. Jonathan Reiss, the misanthropic CEO of Reiss Industries who is after Pandora's box
- Gerard Butler as Terry Sheridan, a former companion of Lara
- Chris Barrie as Hillary, the butler of Lara
- Noah Taylor as Bryce, the assistant of Lara
- Djimon Hounsou as Kosa, a friend of Lara who lives in Tanzania
- Til Schweiger as Sean, an ally of Reiss who runs his mercenary army
- Simon Yam as Chen Lo, a Chinese crime lord
- Terence Yin as Xien, a Chinese crime lord and brother of Chen Lo

== Production ==
The budget for the film was $95 million (less than the first film's $115 million budget), and like the first film, it was financed through Tele München Gruppe. The picture was also distributed internationally by Japanese company Toho-Towa.

Filming lasted for three and a half months, which included six-day shoots on location in Hong Kong, Santorini, Llyn Gwynant in North Wales (doubling for mainland China), and a two-week stint in Kenya for shooting at Amboseli and Hell's Gate, with the remainder of the picture filmed on soundstages in the United Kingdom. One scene in the film was set in Shanghai, but it was shot on a set and not on location.

The film also featured the new 2003 Jeep Wrangler Rubicon, first seen when Lara parachutes into the moving vehicle in Africa and takes over the wheel from Kosa. As part of Jeep's advertising campaign, it was specially customised for the film by Jeep's design team along with the film's production designers, with three copies constructed for filming. 1,001 limited-run Tomb Raider models were produced—available only in silver like the film version and minus its special customisations—and put on the market to coincide with the release of the film. Jeep vice president Jeff Bell explained, "[The ad campaign] is more than just a product placement ... the Jeep Wrangler Rubicon is the most capable Jeep ever built, so the heroic and extreme environment in which Lara Croft uses her custom Wrangler Rubicon in Tomb Raider is accurate." In the end, Lara's Rubicon had less than two total minutes of screen time in the finished film.

Director Jan de Bont hated working on the movie: "It was not such a great experience. But more from the reason how the studio tried to really interfere with it in a way. And the thing itself is that the makers of the game were also involved. And they never told me that they, also, have a say in the story. Suddenly there were all these changes that have taken, and who had to be what, and what cast. And then suddenly it became such a big scene. Everything was a big deal." About working with Angelina Jolie, he said: "I kind of like working with her, and she's a character, but I thought she was a very interesting character to work with. She's definitely very opinionated. But not in a negative way, I feel. She was difficult to work with, but for me it was, probably, not a problem. I didn't really see anything negative at that time. And I really ended up liking her very much, so."

== Music ==
The film's soundtrack was released by Hollywood Records and Warner Bros. Records on July 22, 2003. The film's score was composed and conducted by Alan Silvestri and performed by the Sinfonia of London. It was released in 2003 by Varèse Sarabande. A deluxe edition re-issue was published by Varèse Sarabande on October 7, 2022.

== Release ==
=== Home media ===
Lara Croft Tomb Raider: The Cradle of Life was released on DVD and VHS on November 18, 2003; a Blu-ray release followed on October 8, 2013. A 4K UHD Blu-ray version was released on February 27, 2018.

In the United Kingdom, the film was watched by 4.8 million viewers on television in 2007, making it the year's fifth most-watched British film on television.

== Reception ==
=== Box office ===
The film debuted in fourth place behind Bad Boys II, Pirates of the Caribbean: The Curse of the Black Pearl and Spy Kids 3-D: Game Over with a take of $21.8 million. In the United Kingdom, the film opened at number three behind American Wedding and Pirates of the Caribbean: The Curse of the Black Pearl, earning £1.5 million in its first three days. It also ranked third behind the latter film and Finding Nemo in Australia, collecting $1.3 million during its opening weekend. The film finished with a domestic gross of $65.6 million and a worldwide total of $160.1 million.

The Cradle of Life was considered more successful at the international box office, but was a domestic box office failure. Paramount blamed the failure of the film on the poor performance of the then-latest installment of the video game series, Tomb Raider: The Angel of Darkness. After numerous delays, Angel of Darkness was rushed to shelves just over a month before the release of the film, despite the final product being unfinished and loaded with bugs. It spawned mediocre sales, and mixed reviews from critics. Former Eidos Interactive senior executive Jeremy Heath-Smith, who was also credited as an executive producer in the film, resigned days after the game was released. IGN wrote, "the film's lower box office haul was enough to cut this franchise short."

=== Critical response ===
According to review aggregator Metacritic, Lara Croft: Tomb Raider – The Cradle of Life received "mixed or average" reviews based on an average score of 43/100 from 34 critic reviews. On Rotten Tomatoes, the film has a score of 24% based on 175 reviews, with an average rating of 4.6/10. The website's critical consensus reads, "Though the sequel is an improvement over the first movie, it's still lacking in thrills." Audiences polled by Cinemascore gave it a grade of "B−" on a scale of A to F.

Critics continued to praise Jolie as Lara Croft. Andrew O'Hehir of Salon described it as a "highly enjoyable summer thrill ride", praised Jolie and thought it was better than its predecessor. Roger Ebert gave the film 3 out of 4 stars, stating that the film was "better than the first one, more assured, more entertaining ... it uses imagination and exciting locations to give the movie the same kind of pulp adventure feeling we get from the Indiana Jones movies." David Rooney of Variety praised Jolie for being "hotter, faster and more commanding than last time around as the fearless heiress/adventuress, plus a little more human." Screen Daily stated that the film is "smarter, sexier and more stylish than its predecessor".

Rene Rodriguez of The Miami Herald called it "another joyless, brain-numbing adventure through lackluster Indiana Jones territory". James Berardinelli of ReelViews said "The first Tomb Raider was dumb fun; Cradle of Life is just plain dumb ... the worst action movie of the summer." Wesley Morris of The Boston Globe wrote, "It's a bullet-riddled National Geographic special [that] produces a series of dumb, dismal shootouts that are so woefully choreographed there's reason to believe Debbie Allen may be behind them." He then said of director De Bont, "He has yet to meet a contraption he couldn't use to damage your hearing."

Jolie was nominated for a Golden Raspberry Award for Worst Actress.

== Franchise ==
=== Cancelled sequel ===
In March 2004, producer Lloyd Levin said that The Cradle of Life had earned enough internationally for Paramount to bankroll a third film, but any hopes of it going into production were soon quelled by Jolie's announcement that she had no desire to play Lara Croft a third time: "I just don't feel like I need to do another one. I felt really happy with the last one. It was one we really wanted to do."

=== Reboot ===
In 2018, the film series was rebooted with Alicia Vikander as Lara Croft.

== See also ==
- List of films based on video games
