= Alix Wilton Regan =

British actress

- Born: London, England
- Occupation: Actress
- Years active: 2003–present
- Spouse: Adam Lannon
- Website: www.alixwiltonregan.com

Alix Wilton Regan is a British actress known for voicing Calista in The Last Story, Samantha Traynor in Mass Effect 3, the female Inquisitor in Dragon Age: Inquisition, Aya in Assassin's Creed Origins, and Selemene in Dota: Dragon's Blood.

She will portray Lara Croft in the upcoming video games Tomb Raider: Legacy of Atlantis and Tomb Raider: Catalyst.

== Career ==
=== Theatre ===
Wilton Regan has performed in theatrical productions at Theatre Royal Haymarket, The Tricycle Theatre, The King's Head Theatre, The Arcola Theatre and The Landor Theatre. She also performed opposite Jonathan Pryce in "King Lear" at The Almeida Theatre in Michael Attenborough's last show as artistic director there.

=== Film ===
Wilton Regan appears in the lead role of Mary Shelley in the directorial debut of Nora Unkel, "A Nightmare Wakes", which wrapped production in summer 2019. Alix co-starred in the feature film The Wife, as Susannah Castleman, the daughter of Glenn Close and Jonathan Pryce's characters, and the sister of Max Irons'. The film is written by Jane Anderson and directed by Björn Runge. Wilton Regan also appeared in feature film "The Isle" alongside Conleth Hill and Alex Hassell, directed by Matthew Butler-Hart. She directed her first short film, "She Lies Sleeping", in April 2019 for the London Sci-Fi Film Festival 48Hr Challenge. She is also a Founding Director of the London On Film Festival, held at the UK's first social enterprise cinema, The Lexi Cinema, in north-west London. She appears as 'Zoe' in the 2012 UK feature film Life Just Is.

== Filmography ==
=== Film ===
Year	Title	Role	Notes
2009	Elemental Storage	Alice Hargrave	
2010	The Symmetry of Love	Jane	
2011	World of the Dead: The Zombie Diaries 2	Leeann	
2012	Life Just Is	Zoe	
2013	Real Playing Game	Young Alice	
2013	Castles Made of Sand	Saffy	
2015	The White Room	Kirsty Smith	
2015	Writers Retreat	Daisy	
2015	In Cube	Mariah	
2016	The Gatehouse	Star	
2017	The Wife	Susannah Castleman	
2018	The Isle	Korrigan MacLeod	
2019	Rattlesnakes	Amelie	
2020	A Nightmare Wakes	Mary Shelley	
2021	Two Minutes to Midnight	Generalstabschefin der Armee	
2022	Lockdown	Social Media Activist	aka: The Audition
2024	Dagr	—N/a	Executive producer
2025	The Heartbroke Hitman	Bo	

=== Television ===
Year	Title	Role	Notes
2003	Doctors	Annalise	Episode: "In Loco Parentis"
2003	The Bill	Josie Pike	Episodes: "Antecedent", "Fatality"
2006	Bombshell	Sophie Welling	Episodes: #1.5, #1.6, #1.7
2007	Casualty	Clare Brickell	Episode: "No Return"
2009	Hustle	Michelle	Episode: "Politics"
2010	Come Fly with Me	Françoise	Episode: #1.5
2012–2019	The Amazing World of Gumball	Carmen Verde, Hexagon Lady, Mrs. Mushroom, The Moon (voices)	Series 2–6; 45 episodes
2014	Crossing Lines	Sabina Baxendale	Episode: "The Velvet Glove"
2014	New Tricks	Tessa Dugdale	Episode: "Romans Ruined"
2015	The Erotic Adventures of Anaïs Nin	Leah the Journalist	Television film
2015	Obsession: Dark Desires	Sarah Nottingham	Episode: "Cross Your Heart and Hope to Die"
2017	The Brave	Dr. Kimberley Wells	Episode: "Pilot"
2017	Judge Rinder's Crown Court	Rachel Marsh	Episodes: #1.1, #1.2
2021–2022	Dota: Dragon's Blood	Selemene, Priestess of Mane, Mylur, Filomena (voices)	Series 1–3; 19 episodes
2024	The Stormtrooper Scandal	Herself - Narrator	Television documentary film
2025	The Wonderfully Weird World of Gumball	Carmen Verde (voice)	Episode: "The Astrological"
2025–2026	Patience	Marissa Wilson	Episodes: "The Locked Room", "Paco's Revenge"

=== Video games ===
Year	Title	Voice Role	Notes
2001, 2011, 2021	RuneScape	Ariane	
2009	Risen	Rachel, Martha, Sonja, Tilda	English version
2009	Dragon Age: Origins	Ser Cauthrien, Sanga, Petra, Habren, Mhairi, Ser Tamra, Additional Voices	Also Awakening DLC
2011	The Last Story	Calista	
2011	Dragon Age II	Macha, Lilley, Templar Ruvena, Lieutenant Harley, Mage Sympathizer	
2011	Anno 2070	Tori Bartrok	
2011	Trine 2	Isabel	English version
2012	Deponia	Goal	English version
2012	Mass Effect 3	Comm. Specialist Samantha Traynor	
2012	Risen 2: Dark Waters	Patty Steelbeard	
2012	Chaos on Deponia	Goal	English version
2012	Forza Horizon	Holly Cruz	
2012	ZombiU	Sondra Kelley	
2013	Soul Sacrifice	Sortiara, Illecebra	
2013	The Night of the Rabbit	Anja Mouse, Polar Scientist	English version
2013	The Raven: Legacy of a Master Thief	Patricia Mayers	English version
2013	Divinity: Dragon Commander	Lohannah	
2013	Goodbye Deponia	Goal	English version
2013	The Dark Eye: Demonicon	Calandra	
2014	Divinity: Original Sin	Additional Voices	
2014	Sacred 3	Aria	
2014	LittleBigPlanet 3	Pinky Buflooms	
2014	Dragon Age: Inquisition	Female Inquisitor	Also Trespasser DLC
2015	Guitar Hero Live	Additional Voices	
2015	Warhammer: End Times – Vermintide	Kerillian, Waywatcher	
2016	Deponia Doomsday	Goal, Future Goal, No-Future Goal, Baby Goal	English version
2017	Vikings: Wolves of Midgard	Additional Voices	
2017	Divinity: Original Sin II	Sebille	
2017	Total War: Warhammer II	Female Dark Elf Dreadlord	
2017	Assassin's Creed Origins	Aya	
2018	Warhammer: Vermintide 2	Kerillian	
2019	Ghost Recon Breakpoint	Nomad (Female)	Replaced Andrea Deck
2020	Wolcen: Lords of Mayhem	Valeria	
2020	Amnesia: Rebirth	Anastasie "Tasi" Trianon	
2020	Cyberpunk 2077	Alt Cunningham	
2020	Medal of Honor: Above and Beyond	Juliette	
2021	Biomutant	Light Aura	
2021	Sherlock Holmes Chapter One	Additional Voices	
2022	CrossfireX	Veŕonique Fontaine	
2022	Return to Monkey Island	Madison	
2022	Warhammer 40,000: Darktide	Traitor Captain, Female Maul Arbites	
2023	Cyberpunk 2077: Phantom Liberty	Alt Cunningham	
2024	Wuthering Waves	Augusta	English version
2024	The Elder Scrolls Online: Gold Road	Ithelia the Daedric Prince	
2024	Tales of Kenzera: Zau	—N/a	Executive producer
2024	The First Descendant	Sienna, Ember	
2024	Dragon Age: The Veilguard	Female Inquisitor	
2024	Chicken Police: Into the Hive!	Kayla	
Cancelled	Perfect Dark	Joanna Dark	
2025	Lies of P: Overture	Lea Florence Monad	
2025	Dead Take	Various Roles	Also executive producer
2025	Borderlands 4	Additional Voices	
2025	The Outer Worlds 2	Additional Voices	
2027	Squadron 42	The Player	
2027	Tomb Raider: Legacy of Atlantis	Lara Croft	
2027	Tomb Raider: Catalyst	Lara Croft	

== Awards and nominations ==
Year	Award	Category	Nominated work	Result	Ref.
2026	22nd British Academy Games Awards	Performer in a Supporting Role	Lies of P: Overture	Nominated	
