= Crystal Dynamics =

American video game developer

Crystal Dynamics, Inc.
- Type: Subsidiary
- Industry: Video games
- Founded: July 8, 1992; 34 years ago in Palo Alto, California, US
- Founders: Madeline Canepa; Judy Lange; Dave Morse
- Headquarters: San Carlos, California, US
- Key people: Scot Amos (head of studio)
- Products: Tomb Raider series; Legacy of Kain series; Gex series
- Number of employees: 273 (2022)
- Parent: Eidos Interactive (1998–2009); Square Enix Limited (2009–2022); CDE Entertainment (2022–present)
- Divisions: Crystal Northwest; Crystal Southwest
- Website: crystaldynamics.com

Crystal Dynamics, Inc. is an American video game developer based in San Carlos, California. The studio is best known for its games in the Tomb Raider, Legacy of Kain, and Gex series.

Madeline Canepa, Judy Lange, and Dave Morse founded Crystal Dynamics as a spin-off from The 3DO Company in July 1992. Initially focusing on the 3DO console, the studio's first title, Crash 'N Burn (1993), was the system's pack-in game. In 1994, it became the first developer for the PlayStation outside Japan and soon began converting its older titles for the system. The studio also created Gex (1995) and published Blood Omen: Legacy of Kain (1996), later expanding both into franchises. Facing financial hardships in 1996, the company's investors instituted significant layoffs and the discontinuation of its game publishing business. As fiscal issues persisted, the publisher Eidos Interactive acquired the studio in November 1998.

In 2003, Eidos Interactive put Crystal Dynamics in charge of the Tomb Raider series, and the studio consequently developed a modernized trilogy with Tomb Raider: Legend (2006), Tomb Raider: Anniversary (2007), and Tomb Raider: Underworld (2008). In 2009, Crystal Dynamics became part of the Japanese conglomerate Square Enix as that company acquired and consolidated Eidos Interactive's parent company. The studio then developed the first two games in a Tomb Raider reboot trilogy—Tomb Raider (2013) and Rise of the Tomb Raider (2015)—and shifted into a support role for Shadow of the Tomb Raider (2018) while working on Marvel's Avengers (2020). Square Enix sold Crystal Dynamics to Embracer Group in August 2022.

As of 2022, Crystal Dynamics employs 273 people across three studios under the leadership of the head of studio Scot Amos. The company is working on Tomb Raider: Legacy of Atlantis and Tomb Raider: Catalyst, which are scheduled for 2027.

== History ==
=== Background and early years (1992–1995) ===
Crystal Dynamics was founded by Madeline Canepa, Judy Lange, and Dave Morse on July 8, 1992, when they spun off from The 3DO Company. Canepa and Lange were previously marketing executives for Sega, where the former's integral role in the launch of Sonic the Hedgehog gave her the nickname "Mother of Sonic". Morse had co-founded Amiga Corporation, the creator of the Amiga family of home computers, and New Technology Group, which sought to design a video game console. In 1990, New Technology Group had partnered with Electronic Arts to create the 3DO, a collaboration that eventually grew into The 3DO Company. At Crystal Dynamics, Lange assumed the president role and Canepa headed the marketing department. While Morse became its chairman and chief executive officer (CEO), he also continued as New Technology Group's CEO until that company was merged into The 3DO Company. Technology Partners and Kleiner Perkins Caufield & Byers provided Crystal Dynamics with seed capital. The studio set up its first offices in the retail space of Palo Alto Airport in Palo Alto, California. Mark Cerny, also from Sega, became its first developer later that year. The studio's first projects were Crash 'N Burn and Total Eclipse, which entered production simultaneously and were announced as launch titles for the upcoming 3DO in April 1993. Cerny was vital in the development of the game engine technology used by Crash 'N Burn, Total Eclipse, and Off-World Interceptor. Developing for the system meant that the company could produce games for the CD-ROM format, avoiding the higher costs associated with cartridges.

In June 1993, Crystal Dynamics hired as its president and CEO Strauss Zelnick, who resigned as the president and chief operating officer (COO) at 20th Century Fox. According to Lange, Zelnick had been hired for his business expertise, whereas creative expertise was already present at the studio, which had twenty-eight developers at that time. Zelnick acquired between 25% and 50% of Crystal Dynamics and brought in further investors through earlier connections: Home Box Office bought 10% in July 1993, followed by King World acquiring 10% for US$7.5 million in September of that year. The combined value of the latter two stakes was estimated at $20 million. Zelnick's background in film and television increased Crystal Dynamics's focus on full-motion video in its games. Crash 'N Burn was released as the 3DO's pack-in game in October 1993. An editorial in Electronic Gaming Monthly from the same month declared the studio "the hottest new video game company on the upscale scene".

In January 1994, Zelnick drafted plans for Star Interactive, which was to publish third-party games by outsourcing the management and distribution to Crystal Dynamics and the manufacturing to a third company. Crystal Dynamics was to receive annual payments of $1.5 million and 10% of Star Interactive's profit for the management role, plus 22.5% of its gross receipts for the distribution. Star Interactive's management was to consist of The Software Toolworks's former senior vice president (VP) Mark Beaumont as CEO, in addition to Crystal Dynamics's VP of sales Allen Chaplin, and Lange, then the company's executive VP. In February, Zelnick announced his intent for Crystal Dynamics to, like a movie studio, produce games internally while also releasing titles from independent developers. It hired Fred Ford and Paul Reiche III of Toys for Bob, initially as contractors and later as employees, to release The Horde, which they had pitched to Canepa and Lange during their time at Sega. Another potential publishing project had been Naughty Dog's Way of the Warrior, which the developer showed to multiple companies during the 1994 Consumer Electronics Show. In March 1994, Bertelsmann Music Group (BMG), which Zelnick had been consulting, agreed to handle marketing and distribution for Crystal Dynamics and Star Interactive outside North America. However, as Star Interactive failed to raise the targeted $30 million, the plan for this company was scrapped in early 1994 and Lange soon departed Crystal Dynamics. In August, the studio had more than 100 employees.

Also in 1994, Crystal Dynamics became the first developer for the PlayStation outside Japan. Zelnick had wanted to move away from the struggling 3DO for some time, and Cerny traveled to the headquarters of the PlayStation maker Sony in Tokyo on the company's behalf. Although PlayStation contracts were limited to companies in Japan at the time, Cerny spoke Japanese fluently and signed the agreement in that language, which was approved by Shuhei Yoshida. As Cerny was hired as the head of Universal Interactive Studios shortly thereafter, he never used the PlayStation game development kit the company received. By October 1994, the 3DO's poor commercial performance had a significant impact on the company. John Eastburn, the studio's COO, estimated that 3DO game developers could not break even unless its consumer base expanded from 75,000 to 500,000. In December 1994, the studio partnered with the 3DO manufacturer Matsushita Electric, enabling its 3DO games to be distributed through 10,000 consumer electronics stores. In January 1995, Zelnick left Crystal Dynamics to manage BMG's North American operations, remaining a director and shareholder in Crystal Dynamics. After this move was announced in September 1994, the vacant CEO position attracted several parties interested in acquiring the studio. Although The 3DO Company and Spectrum HoloByte were frequently rumored as potential buyers, Morse stated that Crystal Dynamics was not for sale, having spare savings of $20 million and a newly acquired loan of $5 million from Silicon Valley Bank. He subsequently took up the CEO role and became significantly more involved in the studio. The company hired Randy Komisar from LucasArts as president and CEO in May 1995. Under Komisar, Crystal Dynamics began converting its older 3DO games to the PlayStation and Sega Saturn.

=== Gex, Legacy of Kain, and acquisition by Eidos Interactive (1995–2000) ===
Crystal Dynamics sought to emulate major game companies by designing a mascot character, resulting in the 1995 game Gex, which features an anthropomorphic gecko of the same name. Around this time, Crystal Dynamics published Slam 'N Jam '95 and Blazing Dragons, while also working with the Canada-based Silicon Knights on Blood Omen: Legacy of Kain. The latter project began to lose focus as it grew in scope, so the publisher brought on the writer Amy Hennig to make the game more engaging.

By 1996, due largely to the unexpectedly slow growth of the CD-ROM games market, the studio was financially stricken. In June, the company revealed plans for a reorganization. The board of directors appointed Ted Ardell, a general partner at Technology Partners, as CEO. Komisar, Canepa, and Eastburn were ousted and a third of the company's 102 employees were laid off over three months. Crystal Dynamics subsequently ceased publishing efforts to focus solely on internally developed games. Surplus computer hardware and office equipment were auctioned off in September of that year. Ardell managed the day-to-day operations, and the studio lacked a president until Rob Dyer, previously senior VP and general manager, was promoted to this position in April 1997.

Following the release of the second Gex game, Gex: Enter the Gecko, Crystal Dynamics began producing Gex 3: Deep Cover Gecko. By this point, many developers—including most of the Gex team and Enter the Gecko's lead designer, Daniel Arey—had left the company, with some of them joining Naughty Dog. Bruce Straley, a designer on Enter the Gecko, was offered the director role for the third game, but he chose to join his friends at Naughty Dog instead. Crystal Dynamics further began the development of a second Legacy of Kain game, codenamed Shifter, without Silicon Knights's involvement. While Hennig and Seth Carus created original characters, Silicon Knights filed an injunction, accusing Crystal Dynamics of plagiarizing the characters from Blood Omen. In a private settlement, the two companies agreed that Crystal Dynamics could use Blood Omen's characters as long as Silicon Knights was credited as their creator. Shifter ultimately became Legacy of Kain: Soul Reaver. Toys for Bob, as part of Crystal Dynamics, developed Pandemonium! and The Unholy War, while consulting on Pandemonium 2.

Following losses of $1.5 million in its 1997 fiscal year, Crystal Dynamics agreed to be bought by the British publisher Eidos Interactive in September 1998 for £28.4 million (equivalent to $47.5 million) paid in cash. The studio had returned to over 100 employees by this time. Originally set to close on October 31, the acquisition was completed on November 5, 1998. Dyer and Crystal Dynamics's VP of marketing, Scott Steinberg, subsequently acceded to Eidos Interactive as president and senior VP of marketing, respectively, in January 1999. Toys for Bob's final project under Crystal Dynamics was Disney's 102 Dalmatians: Puppies to the Rescue. The team was subsequently fired during a Christmas party.

=== Taking over Tomb Raider for Eidos Interactive (2001–2009) ===
Among Crystal Dynamics's early projects under Eidos Interactive were Mad Dash Racing (2001) and Whiplash (2003). The publisher also sought a first-person shooter with a sci-fi setting akin to Deus Ex, ultimately mandating it be part of the series. This decision was reversed six months before the game's completion, and it was released as Project: Snowblind in 2005. In the meantime, the Eidos Interactive studio Core Design was completing its work on Tomb Raider: The Angel of Darkness, its sixth game in the Tomb Raider series within seven years. Released as a commercial failure in 2003, developers at Crystal Dynamics believed the game to be in a poor final state. Eidos Interactive consequently assigned the series to Crystal Dynamics, with several staffers excited about the possibility of working on a large franchise they had played before. Hennig, who had since been the director for most Legacy of Kain games, requested to be involved with such a project but was directed to design another Soul Reaver game instead. This led her to leave the studio and join Naughty Dog, where she created the Uncharted series.

For Tomb Raider: Legend, the developers at Crystal Dynamics played through all previous games and read guides to gain a better understanding of their design. They intended to return to the series's roots of exploring abandoned places while adding an original feel, particularly through a new control scheme. The game was released in April 2006 and proved successful, selling 2.9 million copies within its first few months. Its designers then pitched Tomb Raider: Anniversary, a remake of the original Tomb Raider based on the gameplay of Legend. They worked with Toby Gard, one of the series's creators, to understand the intentions behind certain scenes and unrealized concepts from the original game. The game's scope was reduced to roughly half of the original game, which had been deemed too large to remake entirely, and the studio needed to deviate from the original design where it did not suit the newer gameplay. Anniversary was completed in nine months.

The last game in Crystal Dynamics's original Tomb Raider trilogy was Tomb Raider: Underworld. Around this time, a team within the studio pitched a new intellectual property called Downfall, a post-apocalyptic, open-world game set in San Francisco. However, the studio considered working on two large projects simultaneously as too ambitious and decided to halt development on Downfall. Eidos Interactive laid off roughly 30 people from Crystal Dynamics in January 2009, citing the studio's increased focus on Tomb Raider, and installed Darrell Gallagher as the head of studio.

=== Tomb Raider reboot trilogy under Square Enix (2009–2022) ===
By January 2009, Underworld had sold 1.5 million, falling short of Eidos Interactive's expectations. The publisher blamed this largely on issues distributing the game in North America. Eidos plc, Eidos Interactive's publicly traded parent company, then significantly lowered its sales forecast, and its share price fell to its lowest point in mid-January. The Japanese video game company Square Enix subsequently offered to acquire Eidos plc, citing particular interest in the Tomb Raider franchise and the prospect of expanding its Western operations. The buy-out was approved by Eidos plc in March and completed in April. Under Square Enix, another 25 staffers were dismissed from Crystal Dynamics in June 2009 "to focus resources". Gard, who had led a team for an unannounced project for a few months, left the studio in September. In November, Square Enix integrated Eidos Interactive into its European operations to form Square Enix Limited. Gallagher was later promoted to oversee all Square Enix studios in Europe and North America while retaining his role at Crystal Dynamics.

Crystal Dynamics continued to work on the Tomb Raider series, with intentions to reboot the series for new audiences. Over several years, the team discarded many concepts that would have drastically changed the core gameplay, before deciding on a modern, story-driven game with survival elements. The story was planned over three games, beginning with a new origin story. In the meantime, Crystal Dynamics sustained the franchise with the 2010 release of Lara Croft and the Guardian of Light, a spin-off with different gameplay. The first game in the reboot trilogy, titled Tomb Raider, was released in 2013. The studio followed up Lara Croft and the Guardian of Light with Lara Croft and the Temple of Osiris in 2014. Rise of the Tomb Raider was released in 2015. In December of that year, Gallagher left the studio and was replaced by Scot Amos and Ron Rosenberg, long-time producers at the company. Brian Horton, the senior art director for Tomb Raider and director of Rise of the Tomb Raider, left in 2016.

In January 2017, Square Enix announced a partnership with Marvel Entertainment to create multiple video games based on Marvel characters, with Crystal Dynamics developing Marvel's Avengers. The studio had pitched a single-player game akin to Tomb Raider that would see the player take control of the Avengers group of superheroes, switching between characters as the story progressed. However, the studio found that playing one character at a time failed to capture the team dynamic of the Avengers, leading them to refocus the project on multiplayer gameplay. With Crystal Dynamics working on Marvel's Avengers, the third game in the Tomb Raider reboot trilogy, Shadow of the Tomb Raider, was handed to the sister studio Eidos-Montréal, with a small team at Crystal Dynamics working on minor parts of the game.

In August 2018, Crystal Dynamics opened the satellite studio Crystal Northwest in Bellevue, Washington, to support the development of Marvel's Avengers. The late stages of the development saw the onset of the COVID-19 pandemic and consequent shift to work from home, which the studio had not been used to. Because the developers mostly worked alone during this time, the game launched with several issues they had been unaware of and needed later addressing. Afterward, Crystal Dynamics implemented hybrid work and remote hiring. In May 2021, Crystal Dynamics opened Crystal Southwest in Austin, Texas, under the leadership of Dallas Dickinson, who had been an executive producer for the company. Later that year, Crystal Dynamics joined Gallagher's newer studio, The Initiative, in developing a reboot of the Perfect Dark series. Crystal Dynamics was initially to replace the departed Certain Affinity as a support studio but soon took over several unfilled lead roles as the game's development was restarted. The studio further announced another Tomb Raider game in April 2022.

=== Acquisition by Embracer Group (2022–present) ===
In May 2022, Embracer Group announced it would acquire several games and studios, including Crystal Dynamics with its Tomb Raider and Legacy of Kain series, from Square Enix for $300 million. At the time, the studio had 273 employees across its three studios. Square Enix told investors it feared the studios would subsist off the revenue of the group's Japanese-made games, so their sale "could improve capital efficiency". Embracer Group expressed interest in continuing the studio's established franchises, including Tomb Raider and Legacy of Kain, through sequels, remakes, and remasters. The acquisition was completed on August 26, 2022, and Crystal Dynamics became a part of the new CDE Entertainment operating group. The studio was given ownership over Tomb Raider and Legacy of Kain by September. Square Enix retained the Gex franchise and announced ports to modern platforms with Gex Trilogy in July 2023.

In September 2023, at a time when Embracer Group was implementing cost reduction measures, Crystal Dynamics laid off nine marketing personnel and one IT worker. The studio had previously stated that such layoffs would not impact its Perfect Dark and Tomb Raider projects. Crystal Dynamics collaborated with Aspyr, another Embracer Group company, on two collections with remasters of Core Design's six Tomb Raider games. Tomb Raider I–III Remastered was released in February 2024, and Tomb Raider IV–VI Remastered was released in February 2025. The two companies also worked on Legacy of Kain: Soul Reaver 1 & 2 Remastered, released in December 2024. Crystal Dynamics laid off seventeen employees in March 2025, and Perfect Dark was canceled with the closure of The Initiative in July. According to Jason Schreier of Bloomberg News, the managements of Crystal Dynamics and The Initiative spent two months trying to find an external publisher for the game. After a tentative agreement with Take-Two Interactive collapsed due to disagreements over the franchise's ownership, Crystal Dynamics laid off further staff in late August 2025. Thirty more staff were dismissed in November. During the Game Awards 2025 in December, the company announced two Tomb Raider games to be published by Amazon Game Studios: Tomb Raider: Legacy of Atlantis, a reimagining of the first game made in collaboration with Flying Wild Hog, and Tomb Raider: Catalyst, an original entry. In March 2026, Crystal Dynamics published Legacy of Kain: Defiance Remastered, which it developed with PlayEveryWare, and Legacy of Kain: Ascendance, developed by Bit Bot Media and FreakZone Games. The company also eliminated twenty additional positions that month.

== Games developed ==
List of games developed by Crystal Dynamics
Year	Title	Platform(s)	Publisher(s)
1993	Crash 'N Burn	3DO	Crystal Dynamics
1994	Total Eclipse	3DO, PlayStation	Crystal Dynamics
1994	Off-World Interceptor	3DO, PlayStation, Sega Saturn	Crystal Dynamics
1994	Samurai Shodown	3DO	Crystal Dynamics
1995	Gex	3DO, PlayStation, Sega Saturn, Windows	Crystal Dynamics, Microsoft
1995	Solar Eclipse	PlayStation, Sega Saturn	Crystal Dynamics
1996	3D Baseball	PlayStation, Sega Saturn	Crystal Dynamics
1997	Pandemonium 2	PlayStation, Windows	Midway Games
1998	Gex: Enter the Gecko	Nintendo 64, PlayStation, Windows	Midway Games
1999	Akuji the Heartless	PlayStation	Eidos Interactive
1999	Gex 3: Deep Cover Gecko	Nintendo 64, PlayStation	Eidos Interactive
1999	Legacy of Kain: Soul Reaver	Dreamcast, PlayStation, Windows	Eidos Interactive
2000	Walt Disney World Quest: Magical Racing Tour	Dreamcast, PlayStation, Windows	Eidos Interactive
2001	Soul Reaver 2	PlayStation 2, Windows	Eidos Interactive
2001	Mad Dash Racing	Xbox	Eidos Interactive
2002	Blood Omen 2	GameCube, PlayStation 2, Windows, Xbox	Eidos Interactive
2003	Legacy of Kain: Defiance	PlayStation 2, Windows, Xbox	Eidos Interactive
2003	Whiplash	PlayStation 2, Xbox	Eidos Interactive
2005	Project: Snowblind	PlayStation 2, Windows, Xbox	Eidos Interactive
2006	Tomb Raider: Legend	GameCube, PlayStation 2, PlayStation 3, PlayStation Portable, Windows, Xbox, Xbox 360	Eidos Interactive
2007	Tomb Raider: Anniversary	macOS, PlayStation 2, PlayStation 3, PlayStation Portable, Wii, Windows, Xbox 360	Eidos Interactive
2008	Tomb Raider: Underworld	macOS, PlayStation 2, PlayStation 3, Wii, Windows, Xbox 360	Eidos Interactive
2010	Lara Croft and the Guardian of Light	Android, BlackBerry PlayBook, iOS, Nintendo Switch, PlayStation 3, Stadia, Windows, Xbox 360	Square Enix
2013	Tomb Raider	Linux, macOS, Nintendo Switch, Nintendo Switch 2, Nvidia Shield TV, PlayStation 3, PlayStation 4, Stadia, Windows, Xbox 360, Xbox One	Square Enix
2014	Lara Croft and the Temple of Osiris	Nintendo Switch, PlayStation 4, Stadia, Windows, Xbox One	Square Enix
2015	Rise of the Tomb Raider	Linux, macOS, PlayStation 4, Stadia, Windows, Xbox 360, Xbox One	Microsoft Studios, Square Enix, Feral Interactive
2018	Shadow of the Tomb Raider	Linux, macOS, PlayStation 4, Stadia, Windows, Xbox One	Square Enix
2020	Marvel's Avengers	PlayStation 4, PlayStation 5, Stadia, Windows, Xbox One, Xbox Series X/S	Square Enix
2024	Tomb Raider I–III Remastered	Nintendo Switch, PlayStation 4, PlayStation 5, Windows, Xbox One, Xbox Series X/S	Aspyr
2024	Legacy of Kain: Soul Reaver 1 & 2 Remastered	Nintendo Switch, PlayStation 4, PlayStation 5, Windows, Xbox One, Xbox Series X/S	Aspyr
2025	Tomb Raider IV–VI Remastered	Nintendo Switch, PlayStation 4, PlayStation 5, Windows, Xbox One, Xbox Series X/S	Aspyr
2026	Legacy of Kain: Defiance Remastered	Nintendo Switch, PlayStation 4, PlayStation 5, Windows, Xbox One, Xbox Series X/S	Crystal Dynamics
2027	Tomb Raider: Legacy of Atlantis	Nintendo Switch 2, PlayStation 5, Windows, Xbox Series X/S	Amazon Game Studios
2028	Tomb Raider: Catalyst	PlayStation 5, Windows, Xbox Series X/S	Amazon Game Studios

=== Canceled ===
- Downfall
- Perfect Dark

== Games published ==
List of games published by Crystal Dynamics
Year	Title	Platform(s)	Developer(s)
1994	The Horde	3DO, MS-DOS, PlayStation, Sega Saturn	Toys for Bob
1994	Star Control II	3DO	Toys for Bob
1994	PaTaank	3DO	PF.Magic
1995	Slam 'N Jam '95	3DO	Left Field Productions
1996	Slam 'N Jam '96 Featuring Magic & Kareem	MS-DOS, PlayStation, Sega Saturn	Left Field Productions
1996	Blazing Dragons	PlayStation, Sega Saturn	The Illusions Gaming Company
1996	Pandemonium!	PlayStation, Sega Saturn, Windows	Toys for Bob
1996	Blood Omen: Legacy of Kain	PlayStation, Windows	Silicon Knights
2026	Legacy of Kain: Ascendance	Nintendo Switch, Nintendo Switch 2, PlayStation 4, PlayStation 5, Windows, Xbox Series X/S	Bit Bot Media, FreakZone Games
