= Earl Baylon =

American actor

- Born: East Hollywood, California, U.S.
- Occupation: Actor
- Years active: 2011–present
- Known for: Jonah Maiava in Tomb Raider (2013 video game), Rise of the Tomb Raider, and Shadow of the Tomb Raider

Earl Baylon is an American actor. He is the voice actor for the Māori character Jonah Maiava in the Tomb Raider video game trilogy and the Netflix anime series Tomb Raider: The Legend of Lara Croft. He has also voiced characters in video games including Starfield, Rise of the Rōnin, and Batman: Arkham Shadow, and the animated series Arcane and Vinland Saga.

== Early life and education ==
Baylon was born in East Hollywood, California, and raised in Long Beach, California. He is of Filipino descent. He was active in performing arts from a young age and appeared in school musicals and played piano and guitar. In middle school he formed an acapella R&B group with friends.

During college Baylon was a biological sciences major on the pre-med track. However, his involvement in improv was the catalyst for him to turn his attention to acting as a profession.

== Career ==
Baylon was offered representation by an agent who attended one of his sketch comedy shows. His breakout role as a voice actor was for the Tomb Raider video game trilogy as Lara Croft's best friend Jonah Maiava, beginning with Tomb Raider (2013), followed by Rise of the Tomb Raider (2015), and Shadow of the Tomb Raider (2018). He reprised the role for the Netflix anime series Tomb Raider: The Legend of Lara Croft (2024), which was renewed for season two.

Baylon also voiced Manaaki Almonte in the video game Starfield (2023) and Kaishu Katsu in the video game Rise of the Rōnin (2024). He is the voice actor for the character Lyle Bolton in the VR video game Batman: Arkham Shadow, released in 2024.

He voiced the character Loris on season two of the Netflix animated series Arcane (2024). He voiced Thorgil and Harald on Vinland Saga (2023) and Caparaz on the Apple TV+ series Curses!.

He acted in the independent films Lumpia with a Vengeance (2020) and This Time (2023), and the television series St. Denis Medical and Welcome to Chippendales.

Baylon is the artistic director for Room to Improv, an AAPI comedy troupe in Los Angeles.

== Personal life ==
He is an avid comic book reader and gamer.

== Filmography ==
=== Television ===
Year	Title	Role	Notes	Ref.
2021	Trese	Tamaraw Spirit, General Villar		
2021	Arcane	Loris		
2022	Tekken: Bloodline	Ganryu		
2023	Vinland Saga	Thorgil, Harald		
2024–25	Tomb Raider: The Legend of Lara Croft	Jonah Maiava		
2025	Mobile Suit Gundam GQuuuuuuX	Bask Om, Tokwan		

=== Video games ===
Year	Title	Role	Notes	Ref.
2013	Tomb Raider	Jonah Maiava	Motion capture	
2015	Rise of the Tomb Raider	Jonah Maiava	Motion capture	
2018	Shadow of the Tomb Raider	Jonah Maiava	Motion capture	
2023	Starfield	Manaaki Almonte		
2023	Avatar: The Last Airbender - Quest for Balance	Roku, Shyu		
2024	Rise of the Rōnin	Kaishu Katsu	English version	
2024	Batman: Arkham Shadow	Lyle Bolton	Motion capture	
2024	Final Fantasy VII Rebirth			
2024	Like a Dragon: Infinite Wealth			
2025	Fatal Fury: City of the Wolves	Marco Rodrigues		
2026	Yakuza Kiwami 3 & Dark Ties	Mikio Aragaki, additional voices		
