= Tomb Raider: Catalyst =

2028 video game

- Developer: Crystal Dynamics
- Publisher: Amazon Game Studios
- Director: Will Kerslake
- Series: Tomb Raider
- Engine: Unreal Engine 5
- Platforms: PlayStation 5; Windows; Xbox Series X/S
- Release: 2028
- Genre: Action-adventure
- Mode: Single-player

Tomb Raider: Catalyst is an upcoming action-adventure game developed by Crystal Dynamics and published by Amazon Game Studios. It is the fourteenth main entry in the Tomb Raider series and the sequel to Tomb Raider: Underworld (2008). The story takes place in Northern India years after the events of Underworld and follows Lara Croft as she navigates the aftermath of a mythical cataclysm. The game is now scheduled to release for PlayStation 5, Windows, and Xbox Series X/S in the announced 2028 release window.

== Premise ==
Tomb Raider: Catalyst is set in Northern India, years after the events of Tomb Raider: Underworld (2008). A mythical cataclysm has exposed ancient ruins and awakened the forces guarding them. The story follows Lara Croft as she explores the region, competing against rival treasure hunters seeking to exploit the site's power. She must determine whom to trust to secure the ancient secret and prevent a catastrophe.

== Development and release ==
In 2021, game director Will Kerslake stated that Crystal Dynamics envisioned the future of Tomb Raider as taking place after the previous instalments, with the goal of unifying the timelines of both Core Design's and their own Tomb Raider games. The development of Catalyst began in 2022. Crystal Dynamics have divided into two teams: one working on Catalyst and the other co-developing Tomb Raider: Legacy of Atlantis (2027), a remake of the original 1996 game, with Flying Wild Hog. A single leadership team oversees both projects to manage shared resources and ensure narrative consistency. Crystal Dynamics are also collaborating with creative staff from Amazon Game Studios, which the studio partnered with as publisher in 2022.

The developers seek to design the game to be accessible to players without prior knowledge of the series, while remaining appealing to long-time fans. Set in India, which the studio described as a "fan-favorite location", Crystal Dynamics head Scot Amos stated that Catalyst is "the largest Tomb Raider that we've made to date". Although a sequel to Tomb Raider: Underworld (2008), the narrative incorporates the second reboot trilogy (2013–2018) as Lara Croft's origin story. Alix Wilton Regan was cast as Lara in both Catalyst and Legacy of Atlantis, succeeding Camilla Luddington, who portrayed the character in the second reboot trilogy. Amos said that Regan possessed "that wit and that charm and charisma that is a natural essence and core for Lara", as well as confidence and emotional depth. The game is being developed using Unreal Engine 5.

Catalyst was announced alongside Legacy of Atlantis at the Game Awards in December 2025. Previously scheduled to release in 2027, it will now be released in 2028 for PlayStation 5, Windows, and Xbox Series X/S per Jeffrey Gattis. On 24 July 2026, Amazon Games boss Jeffrey Gattis confirmed during an interview about Amazon Luna's content strategy that Catalyst had been delayed to 2028, adding that Amazon wanted Luna to become known for major franchises such as Tomb Raider.
