= Tomb Raider: Legacy of Atlantis =

Upcoming video game

- North American box art
- Developers: Crystal Dynamics; Flying Wild Hog
- Publisher: Amazon Game Studios
- Directors: Raul Siqueira; Michał Kuk
- Designer: Jason Epps
- Writer: Maria Borys-Piątkowska
- Series: Tomb Raider
- Engine: Unreal Engine 5
- Platforms: Nintendo Switch 2; PlayStation 5; Windows; Xbox Series X/S
- Release: 12 February 2027 (Note: Pre-ordering the Deluxe Edition grants 48-hour early access beginning on 10 February 2027.)
- Genre: Action-adventure
- Mode: Single-player

Tomb Raider: Legacy of Atlantis is an upcoming action-adventure game developed by Crystal Dynamics and Flying Wild Hog and published by Amazon Game Studios. The game is the second remake of Tomb Raider (1996), featuring exploration, puzzle-solving, and expanded storytelling. The narrative follows adventurer Lara Croft (portrayed by Alix Wilton Regan) as she hunts for a powerful artifact from the lost civilisation of Atlantis. The project was first publicly referenced in 2022 and revealed during the Game Awards 2025, alongside Tomb Raider: Catalyst (2028). It is expected to be released worldwide on 12 February 2027 for Nintendo Switch 2, PlayStation 5, Windows, and Xbox Series X/S.

== Premise ==
Tomb Raider: Legacy of Atlantis is a remake of Tomb Raider (1996); it is the second official remake of the latter, following Tomb Raider: Anniversary (2007).

Legacy of Atlantis features a blend of exploration, third-person combat, puzzle-solving, and expanded storytelling typical of Tomb Raider. The narrative follows adventurer Lara Croft as she travels to several exotic locations in search of the "Scion", an artifact from the lost civilisation of Atlantis and fights to keep its power from being exploited.

== Gameplay ==
Legacy of Atlantis introduces several new gameplay mechanics not present in the original game. Lara can use a wrist-mounted grappling hook for traversal, environmental interaction, and puzzle-solving. A new archaeological scanner allows players to analyze artifacts, uncover lore, and identify clues within tombs. The game also features a "Focus" ability that builds over time and can be activated to slow down combat, allowing players to perform precision attacks.

== Development ==
Before the announcement of Legacy of Atlantis, a lead-up to the events of Tomb Raider (1996) was hinted at in the unpatched ending of Shadow of the Tomb Raider (2018). In this original ending, some scenes that were later removed included one showing Lara's dual pistols and a letter from Jacqueline Natla in Calcutta, India, Lara's nemesis from the first game in the original series, which Lara picks up to read after finishing her own letter to Jonah, where the ending concludes. Crystal Dynamics announced it was developing a new Tomb Raider title in 2022, using Unreal Engine 5 following its partnership with Amazon Game Studios.

Between March 2025 and March 2026, Crystal Dynamics underwent four waves of layoffs. Following the fourth round of layoffs, Crystal Dynamics reiterated that they remained "fully committed to the future development of our already announced Tomb Raider titles". Embracer CEO Phil Rogers confirmed that Amazon Game Studios scaling back its video game development ambitions throughout 2025 impacted the development of Tomb Raider: Legacy of Atlantis.

Generative AI was used in the development of Tomb Raider: Legacy of Atlantis. The disclosure on the game's Steam listing says that it was used to support "some early exploration and temporary development content" while "Any AI-assisted assets were either replaced or refined by humans". Crystal Dynamics experience director Jeff Adams claimed that it was used "to get to a right answer fast" while Lara herself was "100% human-crafted". According to Adams, all content for the final game is human-crafted. When asked by Game Informer about if any generative-AI-created assets were ever entered into the engine, a PR representative interjected, "I think we've said all we want to say about it now".

=== Gameplay design ===
Tomb Raider: Legacy of Atlantis is a remake of Tomb Raider (1996) with modernised gameplay systems. When questioned about the difficulty level of Legacy of Atlantis, especially in light of the instant death scenarios and other issues players faced in the original game, Will Kersake, game director at Crystal Dynamics, commented: "Part of properly reinventing a game is adapting it to the tastes of modern players." Scot Amos, the head of the studio at Crystal Dynamics, said: "It's a love letter by fans, all of us, to fans. We knew the 30th anniversary was coming up and wanted to do something special to celebrate that moment and still honour all of the Core Design's original DNA and intent". The team didn't want players to have the impresson that Legacy of Atlantis is a difficult game with the inclusion of independent difficulty options for both puzzles and combat.

=== Casting ===
In December 2025, alongside the game's announcement, Alix Wilton Regan was announced to be assuming the role of Lara Croft. She takes over the role from Camilla Luddington who voiced the character in the previous three games. Meanwhile, Natla is voiced by Adrienne Wilkinson. Larson Conway is portrayed by Bradley Snedeker through performance capture and is a mercenary working for Natla.

Regan was previously slated to play Joanna Dark in Crystal Dynamics' cancelled Perfect Dark reboot. Regan became aware that a Lara Croft role was being cast when she was contacted by her agent Julie Thompson while on vacation in Italy in August 2022. She self-recorded audition tapes of three scenes in a small Italian village without a reliable internet connection, taking about five hours for them to be uploaded. Regan did four rounds of auditions for the role with some auditions using scenes from the film Lara Croft: Tomb Raider (2001) starring Angelina Jolie. She was cast in February 2023 and began work on both Legacy of Atlantis and Catalyst simultaneously in April 2023 with performance capture and voiceover. Motion capture shoots were done in three week blocks. During performance capture, Regan injured her arm after throwing herself into a door. Regan wanted her iteration of the character to be "an amalgamation of everything that's come before" from the 1996 original to Camilla Luddington's Lara Croft in the most recent Survivor prequel trilogy. However, Regan wanted her portrayal of Lara Croft in Legacy of Atlantis to be distinct from her older iteration of the character in Catalyst. On 10 July 2026, Regan completed her final recording session for Legacy of Atlantis.

== Announcement and release ==
Crystal Dynamics and Amazon Game Studios revealed Tomb Raider: Legacy of Atlantis alongside a new game in the series, Tomb Raider: Catalyst, at the Game Awards in December 2025. Legacy of Atlantis is a remake of the first game in the series. The game was originally announced to be releasing worldwide in 2026 for PlayStation 5, Windows, and Xbox Series X/S. During Sony's State of Play presentation on 2 June 2026, it was announced that the game would have a delayed release on 12 February 2027, alongside the announcement of a version for Nintendo Switch 2.
