= Nathan McCree =

English soundtrack composer (born 1969)

- Born: 27 January 1969 (age 57); England
- Genres: Orchestral; Electronic; Electroacoustic
- Occupation: Composer
- Instruments: Piano; keyboards
- Years active: 1993–present
- Label: Eidos Interactive
- Website: Official website

Nathan McCree (born 27 January 1969) is an English music composer and sound effects editor for multimedia projects including computer games, television, live events, and radio. He worked with Core Design between 1996 and 1998, for the first three Tomb Raider games, among others. He worked also with high-profile names such as the Spice Girls and Orange. In 2008, he became full-time Audio Director for Vatra Games where he worked until 2010. After this, he became Audio Director at City Interactive in Warsaw where he worked on Sniper: Ghost Warrior 2 and Alien Rage (both 2013). McCree then went freelance and set up his own studio in Brno, Czech Republic.

== Early life ==
McCree was born in England and is the third child of Patrik McCree and Beverly Allison. As a child, he spent time singing in a choir from the age of 6 where he learned about harmonies and progressions from choral music.

== Career ==
He started writing music when he was 11, on a Korg Delta synthesizer bought by his father, he used his 4 track reel-to-reel tape recorder to multi-track. He studied Computer Science at Kingston University and got his first job with Core Design as a programmer.

His job there was to code a music sequencer for the Sega Mega Drive; he wrote some music on it to demonstrate how it worked. His manager liked the music and asked him to write the music for Asterix and the Great Rescue.

== Tomb Raider ==
McCree is known for creating the original music for Tomb Raider. He wrote the entire score for the first Tomb Raider in four weeks without insight on the game levels to help him draw the music accordingly. On the following two games, he was still getting very limited descriptions for what musical elements he needed.

He spent three months working on Tomb Raider II.

After Tomb Raider II, he left to go freelance and he was contracted in to do the music for Tomb Raider III.

He was not contracted to work on Tomb Raider: The Last Revelation, being later replaced by Peter Connelly, who composed Tomb Raider music for another three Tomb Raider games. He interviewed Connelly to replace him at Core Design.

== Works ==
=== Audio director ===
- Sniper: Ghost Warrior 2 (2013)
- LEGO: Hero Factory, Brain Attack (2013)
- LEGO: Ninjago (2013)
- LEGO: Chima (2013)
- Silent Hill: Downpour (2012)
- Rush'n Attack: Ex-Patriot (2011)

=== Composer ===
- LEGO: Ninjago (2013)
- Chime (2010)
- Sleepover (2009)
- Blend-It (2008)
- Goosebumps Horrorland (2008)
- Industrial Ambience (Library music album) (2008)
- The Price Is Right (2006)
- Blockbusters (2006)
- Eurosport (2006)
- FIFA 06 (2006)
- The Regiment (2005)
- Custom Play Golf (2005)
- Breed (2003)
- Battle Engine Aquila (2002)
- Laser Squad Nemesis (2002)
- Christmas in Spiceworld (1999)
- Tomb Raider III (1998)
- Tomb Raider II (1997)
- Joypad CD Vol. 2: Tomb Raider II (1997)
- Gender Wars (1997)
- A Tribute to Lara Croft (1997)
- Tomb Raider (1996)
- Blam!-Machinehead (1996)
- Swagman (1996)
- Skeleton Krew (1995)
- Asterix and the Power of the Gods (1995)
- Soulstar (1994)
- Heimdall 2 (1994)
- BC Racers (1994)
- Bubba 'n' Stix (1994)
- Dragonstone (1994)
- Universe (1994)
- Asterix and the Great Rescue (1993)
- Chuck Rock II: Son of Chuck (1993)

=== Sound effects ===
- LEGO: Ninjago (2013)
- Silent Hill: Downpour (2012)
- Rush'n Attack: Ex-Patriot (2011)
- Lord of the Rings: Aragorn's Quest (2010)
- Chime (2010)
- Art Academy (2009)
- Sing It 2: Family Hits (2009)
- Blend-It (2008)
- Goosebumps Horrorland (2008)
- Rock Revolution (2008)
- You're in the Movies (2008)
- The Price Is Right (2006)
- Blockbusters (2006)
- Eurosport (2006)
- FIFA 06 (2006)
- The Movies: Stunts & Effects (2006)
- The Regiment (2005)
- Fable 1.5 (2005)
- Breed (2003)
- Battle Engine Aquila (2002)
- Laser Squad Nemesis (2002)
- Tomb Raider III (1998)
- Tomb Raider II (1997)
- Tomb Raider (1996)
- Blam! Machinehead (1996)
- Asterix and the Power of the Gods (1995)
- Skeleton Krew (1995)
- Bubba 'n' Stix (1994)
- Soul Star (1994)
- Asterix and the Great Rescue (1994)

== See also ==
- "Music" section of Tomb Raider article

Preceded by First	Tomb Raider composer 1996–1998	Succeeded by Peter Connelly
