= Tomb Raider: Chronicles =

2000 video game

- Developer: Core Design (Note: Mac OS port developed by Westlake Interactive)
- Publisher: Eidos Interactive (Note: Japanese PlayStation version published by Capcom and Mac OS port by Aspyr)
- Producer: Troy Horton
- Designers: Andrea Cordella; Richard Morton; Andy Sandham; Joby Wood
- Programmers: Martin Gibbins; Derek Leigh-Gilchrist
- Writers: Andy Sandham; Richard Morton
- Composer: Peter Connelly
- Series: Tomb Raider
- Platforms: PlayStation; Windows; Dreamcast; Mac OS
- Release: PlayStation: EU: 17 November 2000; NA: 26 November 2000; Windows: EU: 24 November 2000; NA: 26 November 2000; Dreamcast: NA: 26 November 2000; EU: 15 December 2000; Mac OS: NA: 20 June 2001
- Genres: Action-adventure, platform
- Mode: Single-player

Tomb Raider: Chronicles is an action-adventure video game developed by Core Design and published by Eidos Interactive. It was first released for PlayStation, Windows, and Dreamcast in 2000, then on Mac OS the following year. It is the fifth instalment in the Tomb Raider series. The narrative continues from Tomb Raider: The Last Revelation with archaeologist-adventurer Lara Croft presumed dead, and three friends recall adventures from her early career. Gameplay follows Lara through linear levels, solving puzzles and fighting enemies. Some levels incorporate additional gameplay elements such as stealth.

Despite the intended death of Lara Croft in The Last Revelation, Core Design was told by Eidos to continue the series; while a new team began work on The Angel of Darkness for the PlayStation 2, a veteran team developed Chronicles based on concepts cut from The Last Revelation. It was to be the last Tomb Raider built on the original engine, with the team having little enthusiasm for the project.

Chronicles received mixed reviews, with critics generally noting a lack of new ideas and mechanics. It is remembered as one of the weakest Tomb Raider games, and at 1.5 million copies sold, is one of the worst-selling games in the series. A remastered version of the game was included in Tomb Raider IV–VI Remastered, released in 2025.

== Gameplay ==
Lara Croft (centre) walks on a tightrope during an early level of Chronicles.

Tomb Raider: Chronicles is an action-adventure video game in which the player assumes the role of archaeologist-adventurer Lara Croft, exploring a series of locations in search of ancient artefacts. The events of Chronicles are portrayed as a series of flashbacks to adventures at different points in Lara's life. The levels are split between four locations: Rome, the coast of Russia, an island near Ireland, and a corporate building in New York City. The Windows version includes a level editor, allowing players to create levels using available Tomb Raider architecture and mechanics.

As with earlier Tomb Raider titles, the game is presented from a third person perspective with a camera system which moves with Lara or remains fixed depending on the environment. Key to progress is solving puzzles scattered through the level, which can rely on pulling different types of switches, completing platforming challenges, or finding key items. Gameplay is mostly carried over from Tomb Raider: The Last Revelation; Lara is navigated via tank controls, can jump in four directions, walk, sprint, crawl and roll through narrow areas, swim and wade through bodies of water, climb up and along ledges and ladders, and use monkey bars to traverse gaps. New additions are her ability to walk along tightropes, swing from horizontal poles, and flip out of crawl spaces.

Lara can search the area, including cupboards, for items such as medipacks and secrets. She has access to several tools including binoculars for seeing distant areas, a grapple gun for creating ropes to swing on, and a crowbar that can be used contextually to break locks. Combat focuses on Lara firing at enemies with her equipped weapon; they are her trademark pistols with unlimited ammunition, and other weapons with limited ammunition that can be found in levels. Each level has specific themes and mechanics: the Rome levels are inspired by earlier Tomb Raider titles, a Russian level includes an Extreme Depth Suit for exploring an underwater area, the Ireland levels portray a young Lara without access to weapons, while the New York levels focus on stealth and give Lara limited ammunition for her weapon.

== Plot ==
Following the events of The Last Revelation, Lara Croft is presumed dead, buried under the collapsed Great Pyramid of Giza. At Lara's home of Croft Manor, three former friends and associates—Lara's butler Winston, the family priest Father Patrick Dunstan and Lara's history teacher Charles Kane—reminisce over some of Lara's early exploits following a memorial service.

The first story follows Lara's quest through the catacombs of Rome in search of the Philosopher's stone. She is pursued by Larson Conway and Pierre DuPont, adversaries she would encounter during the events of Tomb Raider. The second story, recounted by Kane, sees Lara hunting the Spear of Destiny, lost on the ocean floor since World War II. Infiltrating Zapadnaya Litsa, she smuggles herself aboard a Russian Naval submarine commanded by Admiral Yarofev and his Mafia handler Sergei Mikhailov, who also seeks the Spear. Lara recovers the Spear, but she is ambushed by Mikhailov. The Spear's power is unleashed, killing Mikhailov, damaging the submarine, and wounding Yarofev. Lara leaves in an escape pod, but Yarofev remains behind as the Spear destroys the submarine.

The third story, told by Dunstan, follows a teenage Lara when she secretly follows Dunstan to an island haunted by demonic forces. Lara confronts several apparitions and monsters which inhabit the island, including a horse-riding humanoid demon called Vladimir Kaleta who was trapped in a prison of running water by the island's former monastic community. Dunstan is taken hostage by Kaleta, who forces Lara to block the river imprisoning him. Using a book discovered in the ruined monastery's library, Lara says Kaleta's demon name "Verdelet", taking control of him and banishing him from Earth. The fourth story, related by Winston, shows Lara infiltrating the New York corporate headquarters of her former mentor Werner Von Croy to retrieve the Iris, the pursuit of which caused the schism between them.

Their stories completed, the three toast Lara. In parallel to these events, Von Croy digs through the rubble of the Great Pyramid in a desperate attempt to find her. He finally discovers Lara's backpack among the ruins of the Great Pyramid but no sign of her body: he declares "We've found her!", presuming that Lara is alive.

== Development and release ==
Core Design, developers of Tomb Raider since its inception, had grown fatigued of the series after producing three games successively since completing the original game. The team had attempted killing off Lara in The Last Revelation, but Eidos insisted that the series continue. There was some interest from the team in developing a new title for the Playstation 2, but not a fifth title on the original PlayStation. The franchise had become very important for Eidos financially, and the publisher requested a new title for launch in late 2000. Core Design's developers initially refused – which led to Eidos' executive director Jeremy Heath-Smith summoning the developers one by one into his office to encourage them to continue. The writer and level designer Andy Sandham described these encounters with Heath-Smith as "terrifying". After a while, the company resorted to financial incentives and the project went ahead, though morale was still very low.

Core Design split into two teams; one new team worked on Tomb Raider: The Angel of Darkness for PlayStation 2, while a veteran team developed Chronicles. Most of the team from The Last Revelation returned to create Chronicles. Designer Andy Sandham, speaking in 2016, said that the staff created the game to earn a living rather than having any passion for it, deeming it as the worst title in his career. He called it the hardest Tomb Raider title he worked on. Reportedly the lead animator had fun creating new death animations for Lara, as the team as a whole disliked the project. The full-motion video cutscenes were created by ExMachina, a French studio which had previously worked on a number of video game projects including Dark Earth and Final Fantasy IX, in addition to a series of SEAT commercials featuring Lara.

Each area was designed around a different gameplay theme: Rome emulated classic Tomb Raider platforming, Russia was focused on action and stealth elements, Ireland was designed around having no weapons, and the fourth area brought more stealth and a remote companion helping Lara. Several level ideas were originally pitched for The Last Revelation before Heath-Smith insisted that the latter game focus on tomb-based environments. As with The Last Revelation, a separate tutorial area based in Lara's home was removed to reduce the workload. Several gameplay elements were expanded, new moves were incorporated, and the inventory UI refined. For the Windows version, Core Design released the level building tools as a level editor on a second disc, as Chronicles would be the last game using that generation of technology, and they wanted to allow fans the freedom to create levels of their own.

The script was written by Sandham, based on a story by Sandham and Richard Morton. Chronicles was a direct follow-up to The Last Revelation, continuing to assume that Lara was dead. Due to this style, the narrative structure broke away from the linear style used in earlier titles in favour of an anthology format, with four separate adventures loosely tied together by framing sequences. Sandham wrote the game's script after the game's level structure was finalised. There was a continuity error in the Rome segment of Chronicles related to Pierre's apparent death, attributed by Sandham to not "properly" referring to the original game's script. The use of flashbacks rather than a continuous contemporary narrative allowed Core Design to create very different levels without being tied together with an overarching story. It was also designed to close off the original era of Tomb Raider—including its technology and storyline—prior to the release of The Angel of Darkness. The Irish levels were included by Sandham, who had a love of Irish folklore and was inspired by the cover art of The Black Island, a book from The Adventures of Tintin. Jean-Yves, a character from The Last Revelation, was initially the narrator of the Russian section. Due to a controversy about the character's similarity to real-life archaeologist Jean-Yves Empereur, Jean-Yves was replaced with Charles Kane.

The music was composed by Peter Connelly, who returned from The Last Revelation. As with his other projects, Connelly used early level builds as inspiration for his compositions. Taking inspiration from the narrative's gloomy tone, Chronicles used a darker musical style while retaining established Tomb Raider musical motifs. The main theme is short compared to earlier Tomb Raider games, but Connelly had wanted something "epic". Time constraints meant that Chronicles did not have a proper main theme, with the closest being an opening segment that was inspired by Connelly's original plans.

Chronicles was announced in August 2000 for PlayStation, Windows, and Dreamcast for a release in November. Eidos marketed Chronicles extensively through commercials alongside promotional advertisements for the movie adaptation Lara Croft: Tomb Raider. Development was completed on 15 November, with Eidos confirming that the game was declared gold (indicating that it was being prepared for duplication and release). Chronicles was released in Europe on 17 November for PlayStation, and 24 November for Windows. The Dreamcast version was released in Europe on 15 December. In North America, all three versions arrived on 26 November. The Windows version was published in Japan by Eidos on 19 January 2001, being the English version with a Japanese language manual. The PlayStation version was published in Japan by Capcom on 31 May. A version for Mac OS was developed by Westlake Interactive and published by Aspyr on 20 June 2001. Like the Windows version, the Mac OS port included the level editor.

== Reception ==
Reception

Aggregate score
Aggregator	Score		
Aggregator	Dreamcast	PC	PS
Metacritic	59/100	57/100	63/100

Review scores
Publication	Score		
Publication	Dreamcast	PC	PS
Computer Gaming World	N/A	1.5/5	N/A
Edge	4/10	4/10	4/10
Electronic Gaming Monthly	5.5/10	N/A	4.33/10
Eurogamer	N/A	6/10	N/A
Famitsu	N/A	N/A	27/40
Game Informer	N/A	4/10	7/10
GamePro	3.5/5	N/A	3.5/5
GameSpot	7.2/10	6.3/10	7.2/10
IGN	5.8/10	6.3/10	6.5/10
Next Generation	N/A	N/A	3/5
Official U.S. PlayStation Magazine	N/A	N/A	2.5/5
X-Play	N/A	3/5	N/A
ODCM (UK)	6/10	N/A	N/A

The game received "mixed" reviews on all platforms according to the review aggregation website Metacritic.

While reviewers were divided on specific elements they liked or disliked, all noted that the game had few new mechanics, with the series becoming stale and lacking innovation compared to other popular game series. Edge referred to the overall game as mediocre due to its underwhelming graphics and lack of new mechanics. Game Informer journalists had varied opinions: Andrew Reiner enjoyed the premise and sound design, Andy McNamara enjoyed the puzzles but felt the series was growing stale in other areas, while Kristian Brogger and Erik Reppen were both negative due to the lack of mechanical or graphical improvements across five consecutive releases, and all reviewers felt it was time for a series reboot.

David Zdyrko of IGN was primarily mixed about the PlayStation release, calling it the best game in the series yet lacking significant differences from earlier entries. GameSpot's Joe Fielder praised the PlayStation version's graphics, details, and level design. GamePro remarked that the game had improved graphics and a good story but the controls had become antiquated. David Chen of Next Generation was positive about the PlayStation version, but similarly noted a feeling of series fatigue. Electronic Gaming Monthly dismissed the game as a "cash grab" from Eidos, with reviewers noting attempts at new ideas but faulting their poor execution and the clear limitations of the game's engine. Greg Sewart, writing for Official U.S. PlayStation Magazine described Chronicles as the best Tomb Raider sequel to date, but was tired of the series' formula and by-now unfair puzzle and trap design. Japanese gaming magazine Famitsu noted a lack of clear direction in finding puzzle elements while enjoying the character movement.

Reviewing the Dreamcast version for Electronic Gaming Monthly, Sewart noted the improved lighting over the PlayStation version, but negatively noted simplified character models. Fielder summed it up as a duplicate of the PlayStation version, but praised its controls and graphics as presenting better than The Last Revelation's Dreamcast version. Writing for IGN, Anthony Chau praised it as graphically the best console version of Chronicles, but expected more differences from the PlayStation version. These sentiments were echoed by GamePro. Dylan Davies of Official Dreamcast Magazine (UK) noted a few new ideas being implemented and varied level environments, but felt the series had seen little innovation and criticised the port as lacking for the console's power.

Eurogamer's John Bye criticised the lack of PC-specific features such as mouse support and updated graphics. Ron Dulin of GameSpot was mixed on the PC version, saying that the series had not grown with the times. IGN's Erik Peterson noted low-quality graphics carried over from the PlayStation version. Joshua Roberts of X-Play, while generally positive about the gameplay, noticed that the game and the series should have gone into a new direction. Steve Bauman of Computer Games Strategy Plus was more critical, faulting Eidos for publishing yearly titles, and contributing to its decline and formula. Jason Babler of Computer Gaming World, alongside general criticism of a lack of fresh elements, noted increased technical problems and game-breaking bugs. Reviewing the Mac OS version, Frank O'Connor of MacAddict felt the game was "the best Tomb Raider yet", but noted the series had not kept up with the rest of the gaming industry.

The PlayStation version received a "Silver" sales award from the Entertainment and Leisure Software Publishers Association (ELSPA), indicating sales of at least 100,000 units in the UK. In their financial report in February 2001, Eidos included Chronicles among the successful titles published during the late 2000 period. The game has sold 1.5 million units worldwide as of 2009; this made Chronicles the worst-selling Core Design-developed Tomb Raider game, and the second worst-selling main title up to that point.

== Legacy ==
Retrospective staff opinions of Chronicles have been mixed, with many staff feeling it was their worst Tomb Raider project at that time due to a lack of enthusiasm and franchise fatigue. In journalistic retrospectives, Chronicles has been ranked as one of the weakest 32-bit entries, and one of the worst Tomb Raider entries. Core Design's last Tomb Raider title, The Angel of Darkness (2003), was beset with production issues and released to poor critical reception, leading to Eidos taking the property away from Core Design.

Chronicles was re-released as part of Tomb Raider IV–VI Remastered, a high-definition remaster for Nintendo Switch, PlayStation 4, PlayStation 5, Windows, Xbox One, and Xbox Series X/S on 14 February 2025. It was developed and published by Aspyr in partnership with Crystal Dynamics. The remaster includes options for new control schemes, and revamped graphics.
