= Tomb Raider: The Last Revelation =

1999 video game

- Developer: Core Design (Note: Mac OS port developed by Westlake Interactive.)
- Publisher: Eidos Interactive (Note: Japanese PlayStation and Dreamcast versions published by Capcom Mac OS port by Aspyr.)
- Producer: Troy Horton
- Programmers: Chris Coupe; Martin Gibbins; Derek Leigh-Gilchrist
- Writers: Hope Caton; Andrew Sandham
- Composer: Peter Connelly
- Series: Tomb Raider
- Platforms: Microsoft Windows; PlayStation; Dreamcast; Mac OS
- Release: Windows, PlayStation: NA: 24 November 1999; EU: 3 December 1999; Dreamcast: EU: 24 March 2000; NA: 25 March 2000; Mac OS: NA: 12 June 2000
- Genres: Action-adventure, platform
- Mode: Single-player

Tomb Raider: The Last Revelation is an action-adventure video game developed by Core Design and published by Eidos Interactive. It was first released for PlayStation and Microsoft Windows in 1999, then on Dreamcast and Mac OS the following year. It is the fourth instalment in the Tomb Raider series. The narrative follows archaeologist-adventurer Lara Croft as she races to imprison the Egyptian god Set after accidentally setting him free. Gameplay features Lara navigating levels split into multiple areas and room complexes, fighting enemies and solving puzzles to progress.

Production of The Last Revelation began in 1998. Due to the strain of developing Tomb Raider titles non-stop since 1996, and general fatigue with the character, the Core Design staff wrote the narrative to end with Lara's death. While the same basic engine was used, it was extensively redesigned for better graphics and more intelligent enemy behaviour. The Dreamcast version emerged following the end of Sony's PlayStation exclusivity agreement with Eidos. The music was composed by Peter Connelly in his first major work on the series.

The game received generally positive reviews from critics, with many praising it as a return to form, but noting a lack of major innovation; several critics felt the series was becoming stale. The Dreamcast port was generally criticised for its poor technical performance compared to other platforms. As of 2009, The Last Revelation is the fourth best-selling Tomb Raider title with over five million copies sold worldwide. Eidos continued the series, and two more Tomb Raider titles began production at the same time; Tomb Raider: Chronicles for PlayStation, Dreamcast and home computers, and The Angel of Darkness for PlayStation 2 and home computers. A remastered version of the game was included in Tomb Raider IV–VI Remastered, released in 2025.

== Gameplay ==
Lara Croft (center) explores a level in third-person view.

Tomb Raider: The Last Revelation is an action-adventure video game in which the player assumes the role of archaeologist-adventurer Lara Croft, exploring a series of ancient ruins and tombs in search of ancient artefacts. The levels are split between a mandatory two-level tutorial area set in Cambodia, and the other levels taking place across locations in Egypt. Levels are separated into different zones, and some level areas need to be revisited to progress further into the game. As with earlier Tomb Raider titles, the game is presented from a third person perspective. Key to progress is solving puzzles scattered through the level, which can rely on both pulling different types of switches or finding key items. During some levels, Lara has access to a Jeep and a motorcycle with a sidecar for vehicle sections.

As with previous entries, Lara is controlled through levels using tank controls. In addition Lara can sprint, walk, move certain objects, take manual control of the game camera to look around the area, climb, monkey swing using suitable overhead surfaces, crawl through narrow spaces, roll, and jump across gaps. There are also secret actions such as turning mid-jump, performing swan dives into water, and performing a handstand. In deep bodies of water, Lara can swim around, with a limited amount of breath before she must surface or risk drowning. In shallower water, Lara can only wade at walking pace and jump vertically. In addition to her standard and returning moves, Lara can climb up poles and ropes, swing on ropes to cross gaps or navigate between the floors of a level, use a scope to aim a weapon accurately, and climb around corners. Some environmental elements such as torches can also be interacted with.

Combat involves Lara engaging enemies which appear at certain points in the environment. Lara's main weapons are her recurring dual pistols with unlimited ammunition. A shotgun, Uzis, revolver, grenade launcher, and crossbow can also be found across the game; all have limited ammunition, and some have multiple types for different effects on enemies. Players can switch between manual and automatic targeting systems. A laser scope can also be found, which when attached to a compatible weapon allows for accurate aiming from a first-person perspective. Key items in multiple levels are the binoculars for seeing distant areas, the crowbar for prying items from set places or opening some doors, and flares for illuminating dark areas. The inventory system is different from earlier entries, which used a ring system. The Last Revelation uses horizontal scrolling menus, and adds another layer for combining items or switching ammunition types for weapons. Consumable items such as health packs and ammunition can be found through the level, including secret caches of supplies.

== Plot ==
The Last Revelation opens with a flashback to a teenage Lara Croft in 1984, when she and her mentor Werner Von Croy are exploring a section of Angkor Wat for an artefact called the Iris. Upon discovering the Iris, Von Croy's haste to retrieve it triggers a trap, forcing Lara to escape without him. In the game's present of late 1999, Lara is in Egypt exploring the Tomb of Set, where the titular god of chaos is said to be imprisoned. She finds the legendary Amulet of Horus within the tomb, and escapes with it after being betrayed by her guide, who is working for Von Croy. Writing on the Amulet reveals that Lara's actions have released Set. Guided by her friend Jean-Yves, Lara explores ruins beneath Karnak and enters the tomb of Semerkhet, human ally to Set's rival Horus.

Having foreseen Lara's actions, Semerkhet left instructions for summoning Horus into the world at the turn of the millennium by cladding a stone statue of the god in his Armour and empowering it with the Amulet. While at Karnak, Von Croy ambushes Lara and steals the Amulet. Reaching Alexandria, Lara and Jean-Yves race against Von Croy's minions to retrieve the Armour of Horus from the buried ruins of Cleopatra's palace, while Set's forces move in to guard ancient sites. While Lara recovers the Armour of Horus, Von Croy kidnaps Jean-Yves and holds him for ransom in Cairo, asking for the Armour in exchange. On his way to Cairo, Von Croy is possessed by Set.

Lara arrives to find Cairo overrun by Set's forces. With help from the Egyptian Army sergeant Azizas, Lara gathers triggers for a truckload of explosives to kill a giant serpent blocking the path into the Citadel of Saladin. Azizas sacrifices himself driving the truck into the serpent. Lara rescues Jean-Yves, then pursues Von Croy into the Crusader vaults beneath the Citadel to retrieve the tablet containing Set's binding incantation. While Set offers Lara a chance to be his ally, Lara refuses and retrieves the Amulet. Beneath the Great Pyramid of Giza, Lara begins summoning Horus, but Set disrupts the ritual and attacks Lara. Lara escapes, using the Amulet to trap Set beneath the pyramid. Exhausted and injured as the temple crumbles, Lara meets Von Croy waiting outside. Unsure about whether he is himself, Lara does not take his hand as she hangs from a ledge, and Von Croy is forced to run as the temple collapses, leaving Lara's fate uncertain.

== Development ==
Production of The Last Revelation began in mid-1998, with development running parallel to Tomb Raider III. By this point, series developer Core Design had produced games annually for publisher Eidos Interactive since completing the original game. This led to both franchise fatigue, and emerging physical and mental health issues among the staff. They were also running out of ideas for keeping the franchise relevant. Since they were being given a large amount of creative freedom by Eidos, the staff secretly decided to kill off Lara and close the series. They formed the plan over a fortnight, and managed to keep it secret until it was too late to make any changes. When Core Design CEO Jeremy Heath-Smith discovered the team's plan, he reprimanded the team. Despite ultimately failing, the team were generally happy to have killed off Lara.

The story was created by Andrew Sandham, Pete Duncan, Kieron O'Hara and Richard Morton; the script was written by Sandham and Hope Caton. The title and concept came from the team wanting to create something new, a "revelation" for the series. The development team began by reading books on ancient civilizations, then designed levels based on these, which Sandham shaped into the plotline. Sandham's extensive involvement in the story was due to no-one else wanting to be involved. The limited location kept the narrative and aesthetic focused, while also giving a rich mythology from which to draw enemies and environments. While the location provided a lot of interesting elements, it also proved challenging due to a potentially-limited colour and texture palette. A trip on location was initially planned, but production deadlines meant it was cancelled, with the team instead going to the British Museum's Egyptian section and finding books on the region with lots of reference images.

The story goal was kept simple and clear, although there were several twists to the narrative. In an early draft of the planned finale, Sandham had Lara decapitated, but dropped the concept as Core Design's executives would not stand for it. In a series retrospective, Sandham noted that Core Design's attempted killing-off of Lara provided some catharsis for the team despite knowing it would likely not succeed. Lara's relationship with Jean-Yves was compared by staff to that between Fox Mulder and Dana Scully from The X-Files. The character of Jean-Yves caused controversy due to his coincidental resemblance to French archaeologist Jean-Yves Empereur. Eidos issued a public apology to Empereur following complaints from him about the character, and decided not to use the character in future instalments.

The atmosphere and puzzle design deliberately harkened back to the design principles of the original Tomb Raider, while differentiating the concept. The puzzle elements focused back on the solving of problems rather than exploring large environments for keys as had been happening in earlier sequels. Several elements, such as the UI menus and the opening tutorial level, were entirely redesigned so the game would act as a reintroduction of the character to players. In addition to new moves, Lara's existing moveset and animations were tweaked to be easier for players to activate. The targeting system was improved so Lara would lock into enemies within range and could toggle between them. In addition, the enemy AI was reworked to be more reactive and strategic. Speaking on the companion AI, Sandham remembered it being difficult to program effectively as it was a new feature in gaming at the time. While a multiplayer option was considered, it was rejected due to time and resource limits. A separate tutorial area was similarly removed to reduce workload, with tutorial elements instead incorporated into the opening levels.

While using the same basic engine design as had been used up to Tomb Raider III, the team redesigned and rebuilt it as far as possible, with an estimated 90% of the code being new. The engine redesign allowed the environment to have more 3D architecture and interactive objects within levels than earlier titles, along with more context-sensitive lighting. Lara's model was redesigned to remove the polygonal appearance of earlier instalments as much as possible. She was also given more animation during cutscenes, allowing her to blink and have lip movements when talking. The cutscene design, which had real-time sequences merging into gameplay and "natural" zone transitions linking the narrative, was inspired by the cinematic style of Final Fantasy VII and Metal Gear Solid. To make the game more accessible, the inventory rings were replaced by simpler scrolling inventory menus, and the loading screens were removed.

Previous instalments had first been produced for PlayStation and then ported to PC without any changes. With The Last Revelation a dedicated PC version was developed. As a result, the team could incorporate additional graphical elements and techniques such as bump mapping which were unachievable on the PlayStation hardware. The Tomb Raider series had been exclusive to Sony's PlayStation following an exclusivity deal during production of Tomb Raider II in 1997. With the end of the deal in 1999, Core Design decided to port the game to Sega's new Dreamcast console. The aim was to have the title running at 60 frames per second, and incorporate improved lighting alongside graphical features from the PC version.

=== Audio ===
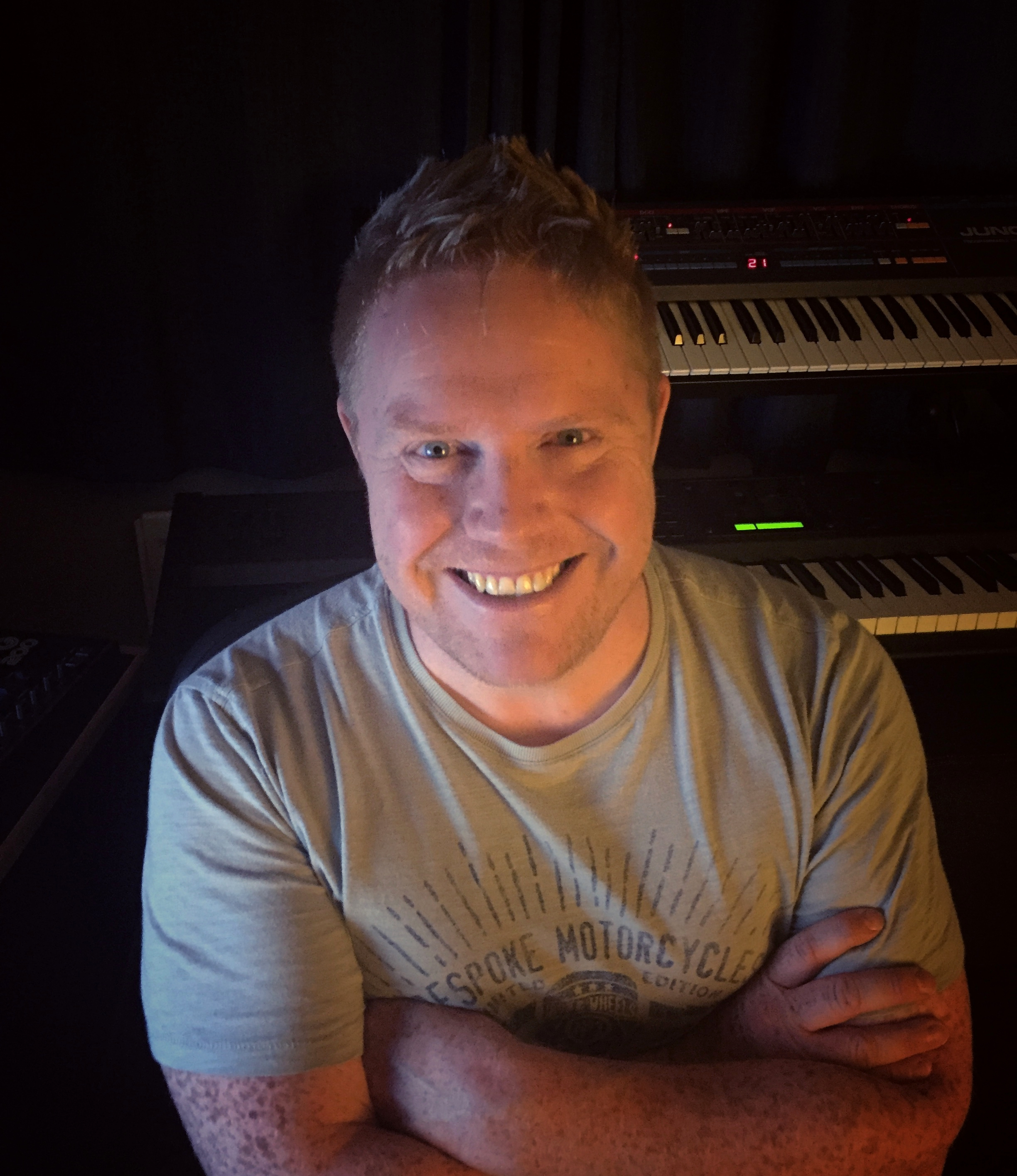
Peter Connelly (pictured 2016) acted as the composer for Tomb Raider: The Last Revelation, having previously worked on sound design for Tomb Raider III.

The game's music was composed by Peter Connelly, who had previously worked on Tomb Raider III and been credited as "Additional Sound Effects". He drew inspiration from the original Tomb Raider scores created by Nathan McCree, in addition to the music of John Williams, Danny Elfman and Hans Zimmer. The main theme "kind of just came to [him]", with the opening harp motif appearing first. Due to the game's location, Connelly wrote it to have Egyptian-style themes and motifs. He used early level designs and story drafts as inspiration for his themes. Connelly reused a piece he had written for Tomb Raider III, the final boss theme that did not make it onto the disc due to time constraints, in The Last Revelation. The Dreamcast release included an exclusive music track created by British DJ Paul Oakenfold, which played in a bonus art gallery.

The voice of Lara was recast from the earlier game, with Judith Gibbins being replaced by Jonell Elliott. Elliott had an established career in voice over prior to auditioning for the role of Lara. She said that she was fortunate enough to have the voice they were looking for, and her ability to voice Lara as a teenager also helped her land the role. Elliott would voice Lara for the next two titles, with actress Keeley Hawes taking over in 2006.

== Release ==
The first rumours of The Last Revelation emerged in May 1999. The PlayStation version released on 24 November in North America and 3 December in Europe. The PC version was released 24 November in North America, and 3 December in Europe. A "Millennium Edition" for the PC version included a limited edition comic from Top Cow Productions's Tomb Raider comic series, a pewter figurine of Lara, and an exclusive collectable card game. The edition was sold through Eidos, Babbage's, Software, Etc. and Electronics Boutique. The PC version was re-released on Steam on 29 November 2012. The Dreamcast version was released on 24 March 2000 in Europe and 25 March in North America.

The PlayStation and Dreamcast versions were published in Japan by Capcom on 19 July. A port for Mac OS, developed by Westlake Interactive and published by Aspyr, was released in North America on 12 June. The Last Revelation will also be released for Evercade in April 2025 as part of Tomb Raider Collection 2, published by the console's designer Blaze Entertainment in partnership with current developers Crystal Dynamics. A Gold Edition of the game, developed by a veteran team led by Phil Campbell, was originally in production. The level plans would have followed a plot with Lara pursuing the Fountain of Youth. The Gold Edition was scrapped for unspecified reasons, and Campbell would move on to Quantic Dream to help develop The Nomad Soul.

Eidos promoted The Last Revelation heavily starting in October 1999, allotting a budget of $5 million. Described by Eidos vice president Paul Baldwin as the company's largest marketing campaign to date, it included billboard advertisements in multiple cities, themed products at multiple stores, ads using the Tomb Raider comic, and a demo disc distribution deal with Pizza Hut. As part of the promotion in the UK, Eidos collaborated with The Times to create a standalone level; the narrative pretext features Lara in conversation with Times editor Peter Stothard before going on an adventure to Egypt. The level was offered for download from a special website, and bundled into the Evercade release.

== Reception ==
Reception

Aggregate score
Aggregator	Score		
Aggregator	Dreamcast	PC	PS
GameRankings	62%	75%	79%

Review scores
Publication	Score		
Publication	Dreamcast	PC	PS
Computer and Video Games	4/5	N/A	N/A
Edge	N/A	8/10	N/A
Electronic Gaming Monthly	3/10	N/A	5.5/10, 4/10, 7/10, 4/10
Game Informer	N/A	N/A	8/10
GameSpot	5.4/10	7.4/10	6/10
IGN	3/10	7/10	8.5/10
Next Generation	2/5	N/A	3/5
PlayStation: The Official Magazine	N/A	N/A	10/10
ODCM (UK)	7/10	N/A	N/A

Review aggregate website GameRankings gave the PlayStation release a score of 79% based on 18 reviews. The PC release saw a slightly lower score of 75% based on 23 reviews. The Dreamcast version was the lowest-rated version, scoring 62% based on 22 reviews. A common point raised across all versions was the attempt by The Last Revelation to reinvigorate the series with its return to tomb environments. The most common complaint for the Dreamcast port were technical issues which made existing problems controlling Lara using tank controls stand out more.

James Price of Official PlayStation Magazine gave the game a perfect score, praising it as the best game in the series to date and noting its improved graphics and gameplay mechanics over Tomb Raider III. James Mielke of GameSpot noted a continued solid foundation for the series, but accused Eidos of milking the series due to the lack of evolution over the annual releases. Stephen Frost of Next Generation highlighted a lack of innovation in some areas such as the controls and basic gameplay design, but overall felt the game to be an enjoyable entry in the series. IGN's David Zdyrko, while saying it was more of the same established gameplay at its core, praised The Last Revelation as the best yet in the series but unlikely to win over new fans. Paul Anderson of Game Informer regarded the graphical improvements and new moves as minor, while Andrew Reiner of the same publication considered the storytelling and graphical presentation to be the most enhanced. Crispin Boyer of Electronic Gaming Monthly appreciated the reduced enemies and obstacles and increased emphasis on exploration and puzzle solving, though he faulted the frequent backtracking in several levels.

In its review of the PC version, Edge, felt the graphics were held back by catering to the PlayStation's limitations, and while enjoyable was lacking as a sequel. Steve Smith of GameSpot also noted solid technical performance, and felt it was the best of the sequels produced up to that point, praising the more coherent story and its positive influence on the gameplay and puzzle design. Vincent Lopez for IGN was less enthusiastic than Zdyrko due to the lack of innovation in the gameplay and engine design, while noting that the PC version was technically stable.

UK publication Official Dreamcast Magazine was positive about the series' return to Sega consoles, enjoying the game design and content but noted that its graphics looked dated for the time. Computer and Video Games was generally positive about the game but disliked the control scheme as it led to multiple deaths. Mielke voiced similar sentiments to the PlayStation version in addition to technical problems. Next Generation's Jess Lungridan was highly critical of the port, feeling that its technical problems undermined the presentation and compounded previously-raised issues. Electronic Gaming Monthly felt it was an underwhelming game originally, and the technical performance on Dreamcast made it worse. Justice was underwhelmed by the game overall, and panned the gameplay as slow and clumsy. In his review for the Mac version, Christopher Breen of Macworld gave it four stars out of five, calling it "a worthy sequel in an already formidable franchise."

The Last Revelation was a bestseller for two months in the UK. The PC version received a "Silver" sales award from the Entertainment and Leisure Software Publishers Association (ELSPA), indicating sales of at least 100,000 units in the UK. ELSPA gave the game's PlayStation release a "Platinum" certification, for sales of at least 300,000 units in the region. In Spain, the Dreamcast version ranked first on video game retailer Centro Mail's sales chart in both the May and June 2000 issues of Revista Oficial Dreamcast. As of 2009, the game has sold around five million units worldwide, making it the fourth best-selling Tomb Raider game at the time after the first three games in the series.

== Legacy ==
Retrospective articles on the game itself and the series describe it as a strong game, but showing the beginning of the series' decline during the Core Design era. The game's developers remembered The Last Revelation as one of their favourite titles despite the circumstances of its production. Despite Core Design's attempt to kill off Lara Croft, Eidos insisted that the Tomb Raider series continued. The production team split into two groups, working on separate projects. A veteran team, composed of many staff from The Last Revelation, developed the direct sequel Tomb Raider: Chronicles. Chronicles was intended as the finale of the old Tomb Raider engine and gameplay style. The game was released in 2000 for PlayStation, Dreamcast and PC, and in 2001 for Mac OS.

A new team within Core Design began work on Tomb Raider: The Angel of Darkness, a title for the PlayStation 2 that was intended as a reinvention of the series. The game ran into multiple production difficulties during its three-year development, including narrative cuts explaining Lara's survival of the events from The Last Revelation. After a mixed to negative reception at its 2003 release, Eidos Interactive took the franchise away from Core Design and gave it to Crystal Dynamics for future entries. The narratives of The Last Revelation, Chronicles and The Angel of Darkness form a loosely-connected trilogy.

The Last Revelation was re-released as part of Tomb Raider IV–VI Remastered, a high-definition remaster for Nintendo Switch, PlayStation 4, PlayStation 5, Windows, Xbox One, and Xbox Series X/S. The collection was released on 14 February 2025, and it was developed and published by Aspyr in partnership with Crystal Dynamics. The remaster includes options for new control schemes, and revamped graphics. This version also included the Times Exclusive level.
