= Machine head (disambiguation) =

A machine head is part of the tuning mechanism of some stringed instruments.

Machine Head or Machinehead may also refer to:

== Music ==
- Machine Head (album), a 1972 album by Deep Purple
- Machine Head (band), an American heavy metal band
- "Machinehead" (song), a 1996 song by Bush

== Films and Television ==
- Machine Head (film), a 2000 independent horror film

== Comics and animation ==
- "Machine Head", an episode of the anime series Bubblegum Crisis Tokyo 2040
- Machine Head, a fictional crime boss in the comic book series Invincible

== Video games ==
- Blam! Machinehead, released in the United States as Machine Head, 1996 video game

== See also ==
- Machin series or "Machin head", a series of UK postage stamps
