= Asterix and the Great Rescue =

1993 video game

- European Mega Drive cover art
- Developer: Core Design
- Publisher: Sega
- Producer: Ken Lockley
- Designers: Jerr O'Carroll; Richard Morton
- Programmer: Stefan Walker
- Artist: Jerr O'Carroll
- Composer: Nathan McCree
- Platforms: Genesis/Mega Drive, Game Gear, Master System
- Release: Mega Drive/Genesis: EU: October 1993; NA: June 1994; BR: 1995; Game Gear: EU: September 1994; NA: 1995; Master System: EU: August 1994; BRA: 1995
- Genre: Platform
- Mode: Single-player

Asterix and the Great Rescue is a video game released by Sega for the Genesis/Mega Drive in 1993 and for the Game Gear and Master System in 1994.

== Gameplay ==
Asterix and the Great Rescue is a side-scrolling platform game. The startup screen offers a choice of difficulty level, as well as the ability to turn off the music and/or sound effects. The Master System and Game Gear versions allow changing characters during a level, whereas the Mega Drive/Genesis version removes this feature in favor of allowing choosing characters at the start of a level.

== Plot ==
This game is based on the long-running, French comic book series Asterix the Gaul. The characters Asterix and Obelix must rescue Getafix (Panoramix) and Dogmatix (Idéfix) from the Romans, who are in the process of taking over Gaul.

== Development ==
=== Music (Sega Mega Drive) ===
Music for the game was provided by Nathan McCree, being the first video game music that he composed. Prior to that, he coded a music sequencer for the Sega Mega Drive and wrote music on the console to demonstrate how it worked. The Core Designer's manager expressed that he liked it, asking Nathan to write the music for Asterix and the Great Rescue. He would later compose music for Asterix and the Power of the Gods and the Tomb Raider series, and he would not do any coding in any game ever since.

== Reception ==
Reception

Review scores
Publication	Score		
Publication	Game Gear	Master System	Sega Genesis
Consoles +	85%	N/A	N/A
Computer and Video Games	N/A	74%	N/A
Electronic Gaming Monthly	20/40	N/A	26/50
GamePro	14.5/20	N/A	14.5/20
GameZone	N/A	N/A	74/100
Hyper	N/A	N/A	91/100
Joypad	89%	89%	88%
M! Games	N/A	N/A	59%
Mega Fun	N/A	N/A	71%
Player One	91%	83%	N/A
Video Games (DE)	N/A	N/A	65
VideoGames & Computer Entertainment	N/A	N/A	4/10
Sega Magazine	N/A	72/100	N/A
Sega Power	N/A	84%	78%
Sega Pro	N/A	74%	N/A

Reviewing the Genesis version, GamePro criticized the steep difficulty slope and poor controls, but they ultimately recommended the game to players who like tough puzzles.

The four reviewers of Electronic Gaming Monthly gave the Game Gear version a 5 out of 10, saying that the graphics are well done, but the sounds are "a nuisance", and that the controls make the game excessively frustrating. GamePro similarly wrote that the Game Gear version's graphics and animation are good but that controlling the character is extremely difficult.
