= Tomb Raider: The Angel of Darkness =

2003 action-adventure video game

- Developer: Core Design (Note: Mac version developed by Beenox.)
- Publisher: Eidos Interactive (Note: Mac version published by Aspyr.)
- Producer: Andrew Watt
- Designer: Richard Morton
- Programmer: Richard Flower
- Artist: Andrea Gordella
- Writer: Murti Schofield
- Composers: Peter Connelly; Martin Iveson
- Series: Tomb Raider
- Platforms: PlayStation 2, Windows, Mac OS X
- Release: 20 June 2003: PlayStation 2; NA: 20 June 2003; UK: 4 July 2003; EU: 7 July 2003; AU: 28 May 2004; Windows; NA: 1 July 2003; EU: 4 July 2003; AU: 16 July 2003; Mac OS X; NA: 18 December 2003
- Genres: Action-adventure, stealth
- Mode: Single-player

Tomb Raider: The Angel of Darkness is a 2003 action-adventure game developed by Core Design and published by Eidos Interactive for PlayStation 2 and Microsoft Windows. A Mac OS X port was developed by Beenox and published by Aspyr the same year. It is the sixth instalment in the Tomb Raider series, acting as a direct sequel to Tomb Raider: The Last Revelation (1999) and Tomb Raider: Chronicles (2000). The storyline follows Lara Croft as she attempts to clear herself of being the suspect of her former mentor Werner Von Croy's murder while investigating the activities of a black magic cult. The gameplay follows series tradition, with Lara navigating platforming environments while incorporating stealth and character growth elements.

The game's development began three years before its release. The intention was to create a different game from previous entries in the franchise, one that could compete better with newer action games and fully exploit the potential of the sixth generation of gaming platforms. It was also planned to be the first in a new trilogy of Tomb Raider games released for the new generation. However, development was fraught with difficulties, which led to the game being delayed twice and numerous planned sections of the game were scaled back in order to meet deadlines.

Despite selling 2.5 million copies worldwide, The Angel of Darkness received generally negative reviews from critics; while some praise went to its story, the game was widely faulted for its poor controls, camera and numerous technical issues. In the aftermath of the game's release, the planned sequels were scrapped, and the development of the franchise was transferred to Crystal Dynamics for the next entry in the series, Tomb Raider: Legend (2006). A remastered version, which reinstates dialogue and mechanics that were scrapped during the original game's development, was included in Tomb Raider IV–VI Remastered, released in 2025.

== Gameplay ==
Tomb Raider: The Angel of Darkness, like previous Tomb Raider games, is a third-person action-adventure puzzle game. Players control the main series protagonist Lara Croft throughout the majority of the game. The majority of Lara's basic moves are carried over from the previous instalment, such as walking, jumping, climbing, swimming, crawling, swinging on ropes and standard gunplay. Her new moves include a small hop, army-crawling, hand-to-hand combat and a "super-jump" that can be performed while running. Lara can also sneak up on enemies and perform stealth attacks, flatten herself against walls and peer around corners. Lara's ability to sprint, present in the three previous entries in the series, is only available when the player opens a cabinet containing gas masks in the 'Galleries Under Siege' level. Her weapons arsenal is also modified from previous games, featuring new weapons such as a K2 Impactor stun gun and upgraded versions of weapons like the shotgun.

Unlike previous games in the series, Lara has a stamina meter that depletes while she is performing bouts of climbing: if the bar empties before reaching her destination, she falls. The rate at which the meter decrease slows if the player performs special actions that increase Lara's strength. These actions are also necessary to progress through many of the levels. The game incorporates elements similar to a role-playing game, whereby Lara can talk with various NPCs encountered throughout the environment and choose what kinds of answers to give: early in the game, these answers will directly affect her progress through the story. The game also features a second playable character, Kurtis Trent. Initially appearing to be an antagonist, he becomes controllable by the player late in the game. He features mainly identical moves to Lara, and his sections of the game are more based around combat.

== Plot ==
The Angel of Darkness follows on from events in Tomb Raider: The Last Revelation and Tomb Raider: Chronicles, where Lara Croft was presumed dead. An unspecified time later, Lara arrives in Paris at the request of her former mentor, Werner Von Croy, who was tasked by a man named Eckhardt to find a set of artifacts known as the Obscura Paintings. The city, and Von Croy, are gripped with fear over a serial killer the press has dubbed the "Monstrum". During an argument between Lara and Von Croy, an unknown force attacks them, and Lara is knocked unconscious. She wakes to find Von Croy dead and her memories of the attack blurred. Suspected of his murder, Lara goes on the run. After retrieving Von Croy's journal from a colleague named Margot Carvier, she learns that Von Croy discovered the location of the fourth Obscura Painting beneath the Louvre; during her time in Paris getting help from local businessman and mob boss Louis Bouchard, Lara is stalked by Kurtis Trent, the last survivor of a society called the Lux Veritatis who are sworn to fight against Eckhardt's plans. After infiltrating the Louvre, she learns that the paintings hide pieces of the Sanglyph, an alchemical artefact created by Eckhardt hundreds of years before. The paintings were seized and hidden by the Lux Veritatis centuries before. After retrieving the painting from its hiding place, Lara is ambushed by Kurtis and robbed of the painting.

The two escape the Louvre as it is assaulted by mercenaries, with Kurtis using a magical disc to keep both Lara and the mercenaries at bay; both are knocked out by a shape-shifting stranger. Lara is rescued by Bouchard, who takes her to Von Croy's apartment to find further clues. At the apartment, Lara relives the murder and realizes that a strange man, revealed to be Eckhardt, had knocked her unconscious and killed Von Croy. However, Bouchard sends an assassin to kill Lara; she is able to eliminate the hitman and heads for Prague, where a new Monstrum killing has taken place. Arriving in Prague, she finds the location of the final painting and re-encounters a captive Bouchard. He reveals that Eckhardt is planning to use the Sanglyph to awaken the Cubiculum Nephili, the last surviving member of the hostile Nephilim race, and breed them back into existence. Bouchard is later murdered by Eckhardt, who is revealed to have been killing and extracting samples for his experiments under the guise of the Monstrum. Lara infiltrates Eckhardt's headquarters in the Strahov Sanitarium, with help from an investigative journalist named Thomas Luddick. The journalist is later captured and murdered by Eckhardt. Lara encounters members of the Cabal, a secret society that shares Eckhardt's ambitions. While going through the complex, she switches off the power, releasing a rabid creature called the Proto-Nephilim. Later on, Lara is locked in a containment area by Kurtis so he can turn the power back on without interference.

Kurtis succeeds, finding his way through the Sanatorium and killing the Proto-Nephilim. Forming an alliance, Lara retrieves the final painting, while Kurtis goes to retrieve a Periapt Shard, one of three magical daggers which can kill Eckhardt. After retrieving the painting, Lara is forced by Eckhardt to hand over the paintings to save Kurtis' life. After Eckhardt releases one of the Cabal's monsters on them, Kurtis helps Lara escape—giving her the two Periapt Shards in his possession—before killing the monster, being seriously wounded in the process. Lara recovers the final Shard and reaches Eckhardt, who reforms the Sanglyph and begins reviving the Cubiculum Nephili. Lara succeeds in wounding him but is stopped by Joachim Karel, Eckhardt's right-hand man. Karel proceeds to kill Eckhardt, revealing himself to be a Nephilim who has been secretly aiding Lara using his influence in the Cabal and shape-shifting abilities. He offers Lara the chance to join him, but Lara refuses after remembering that it was Karel who murdered Von Croy in Eckhardt's form. Lara uses the Sanglyph to destroy the Cubiculum Nephili, causing an explosion that kills Karel. On her way out, she finds Kurtis' weapon and it leads her toward the monster's chamber. Smiling, Lara walks through the door into the shadows, ending the game.

== Development ==
Promotional screenshot for The Angel of Darkness. The game was created to fully use the PS2's power and incorporate stealth mechanics similar to those of the Metal Gear series.

=== Early concepts and split team ===
The Angel of Darkness started development three years prior to its release under the working title Tomb Raider Next Generation. The team were operating under the assumption that after The Last Revelation, the next title would be the generational transition to the PlayStation 2 that they had been looking forward to. An early design approach involved new skill mechanics, with the title to be "almost Metroidvania" in style. The story would have picked up following Lara's fall at the end of The Last Revelation, with an injured Lara being saved by a character called the Shaman and re-learning her abilities.

However, these plans were altered by Eidos' insistance that a new Tomb Raider title be developed for the original PlayStation and be ready for sale in late 2000. The team were highly resistant to the idea, wanting to move on from the PlayStation and do something new. Core Design was ultimately able to bring them around with financial incentives, though morale was low. Core Design separated the group into two teams, with a new team working on The Angel of Darkness and series regulars on Tomb Raider Chronicles. By this stage none of the creators of the original Tomb Raider were working on the titles except programmer Gavin Rummery who had moved into a management role. Tomb Raider Chronicles pushed the PlayStation to its technical limits, contributing to lower review scores and sales than previous titles in the series.

After the completion of Tomb Raider Chronicles, designer Richard Morton came over and found that the new team had gone "off the rails", scrapping the entire project once already and only completing the game's basic story. The programmer Martin Gibbons commented that the team had managed to make "a thousand-polygon tree and a broken engine" which had to be discarded. Former designer Andrew Sandham, who left Core Design during production, recalled that the new team were aiming at something like Grand Theft Auto set across the entirety of Europe, which would have been impossible on the hardware. There was also a general lack of leadership, causing the entire development system to be fragmented. The developers later admitted to being overambitious. Some of them also commented that none of the Core team were prepared for the added complexity of developing for the advanced PlayStation 2.

=== Reuinified team and main production ===
As part of the preparation for the game, the company conducted market research, and decided to create a new setting and story for the main character. One of the main drives behind the game was fully using the new platform's potential and reinventing the character of Lara Croft, including rebuilding her character model and allowing her to perform melee combat. The CGI cutscenes were created by Attitude Studio.

Among the goals of the team for The Angel of Darkness were to create more complicated puzzles and make the character of Lara Croft, together with the tone of the game, darker and more hard-edged. They also wished to compete with some of the newer action-adventure games on the market, which were providing heavy competition, and include gameplay ideas from Shenmue and the Metal Gear series. Many character movements were drawn from and based directly on movements made by real people, similar to later motion capture techniques, and the world design drew from various artists and elements of films from the likes of Luc Besson and David Fincher. Murti Schofield, who had previously worked with Core Design, was brought in to write the story and script. As part of writing the background for the organisations involved in the story, he researched historical secret societies and artefacts, and accurate translations of Latin text incorporated into the game. Schofield created the character Kurtis Trent upon a request for someone who could become the focus of a spin-off franchise. Core spent two years trying to reshape the franchise as well as writing a back story in the form of a book separated into multiple chapters, with The Angel of Darkness being the first of those chapters. According to Schofield, the early plan was for The Last Revelation character Jean-Yves to be the murder victim, but due to a controversy about the character's similarity to real-life archaeologist Jean-Yves Empereur, Jean-Yves was replaced with Von Croy and the story subsequently rewritten.

In order to meet the deadline, areas of the game containing key narrative elements had to be cut; one of the losses was the explanation of how Lara survived the events of The Last Revelation. Among other concepts that needed to be cut were two further locations, character animations, sound bites, and unique gameplay elements involving Kurtis. The planned final confrontation in Cappadocia was reworked to take place in Prague. Some completed environmental assets also ended up being cut by mistake. Some of those elements were also deliberately left out by the team, who wished to bring them into planned sequels. Paris was intended to be a "freeform" with exploration and dialogue elements, but much of the planned content was removed, resulting in some surviving elements sounding and appearing bare or unfinished in the released product. The game was reportedly submitted eight times to Sony before its release. The PS2 version was the focus of development, with the PC port being an afterthought. The PC control scheme was created in a week just a month before the scheduled release. Staff later agreed that the game needed a further six to eight weeks to be finished, but the rush to publish the game denied them that time.

=== Music and audio ===
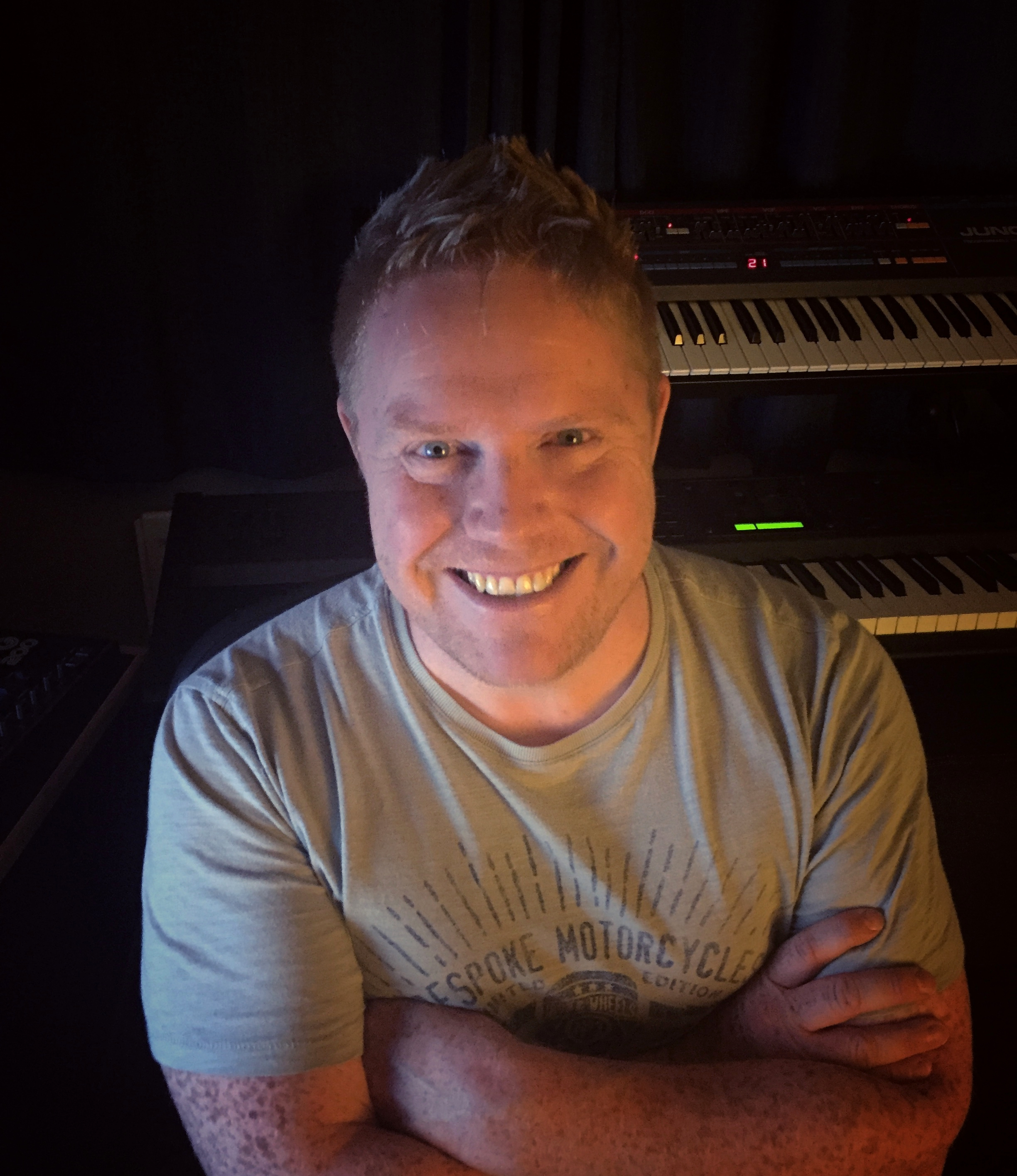
Peter Connelly (pictured 2016) acted as co-composer for The Angel of Darkness, creating an orchestral score performed by the London Symphony Orchestra.

The music for Tomb Raider: The Angel of Darkness was composed by Peter Connelly and Martin Iveson. The soundtrack, compared to earlier entries in the franchise, was far more orchestral. It was also one of the few areas of the game's development that did not suffer setbacks or similar problems. While Connelly had always written his work with an orchestra in mind, previous Tomb Raider scores had used synthesised instruments. He and Iveson approached Heath-Smith about using a live orchestra, and the move was approved. Heath-Smith also agreed to the two's first choice of orchestra, the London Symphony Orchestra. It was known from the start that the score would be performed by the London Symphony Orchestra so it was written with that in mind. Connolly described the split of tracks as "50/50" between him and Iveseon.

The music was recorded in a very short time, meaning the team did not get many retake opportunities. Connelly later referred to the game's main theme as his masterpiece. The track "Dance of the Lux Veritatis" was left out of the game due to both quality concerns and having no scenes to match it. The score was recorded live at Abbey Road Studios, London, in 2002, orchestrated by Peter Wraight and conducted by David Snell. The orchestra had no time for rehearsals, performing them for the first time when they were being recorded. Angel of Darkness was described by Connelly as his "the most exciting project to work on" due to working with the London Symphony Orchestra. The orchestra recorded over forty minutes of music in a six-hour session.

As part of the game's promotion in Germany, Eidos collaborated with German composer Alex Christensen and singer Yasmin Knoch on a single inspired by the game, "Angel of Darkness". Christensen compared writing a single for the series to composing for the James Bond series, using the game's story and visuals for inspiration. The single was released on 14 July 2003 by Epic Records, and also received a music video incorporating footage from the game which was released on 23 June; the video featured Christensen and Knoch transforming into virtual characters and being joined by Lara. The video was released through the game's German website and ran on MTV and VIVA.

Schofield was present at the voice recordings, working with cast members to refine their performances. Jonell Elliott returned as the voice of Lara Croft, having previously voiced her in The Last Revelation and Chronicles. Elliott compared the game's script to that of a movie in its style, contrasting against the earlier games. Her portrayal was influenced by the darker tone of the storyline. Later Elliott said she was unaware of what parts of her recordings were cut from the game until learning from fans. One of her favorite scenes that ended up being cut was a scene related to the deleted Shaman character. At the time, Elliott said she had grown comfortable voicing Lara by the time she recorded for The Angel of Darkness. Kurtis Trent was voiced by Eric Loren, who enjoyed voicing the character and worked with Schofield on developing him during recordings. Veteran actor Joss Ackland voiced Eckhardt. Elliott remembered feeling intimidated by Ackland during the recording sessions due to his veteran status, but was also impressed by his ability. Von Croy was voiced by Kerry Shale, returning from earlier entries. The cast recorded their dialogue together in contrast to the norm of recording voice lines separately, making the process feel even more like they were making a film. Angel of Darkness was Elliott's final time playing Lara, as Keeley Hawes replaced her for the following title.

=== Release ===
The Angel of Darkness was unveiled under its official name in March 2002, with a fuller demonstration appearing at E3 that year. Problems with the game were sensed at an early stage, as Heath-Smith forgot himself and began swearing at the game while trying to demonstrate the opening level at a buyer's conference. A release date was announced for November, but the game got delayed into spring 2003. Eidos stated at the time that The Angel of Darkness would benefit from additional marketing support from Lara Croft: Tomb Raider - The Cradle of Life, the sequel to the original 2001 film. The developers instead stated that Eidos needed the game out to meet Eidos's internal financial deadline. The game was supported by extensive marketing. During the promotion at E3 2002, Elliott performed as Lara for a promotional video, using a motion capture suit with Lara's model mapped over it. The game went gold on 18 June 2003, two days before its original release date, although there was some confusion as the game had reportedly gone gold on 2 June.

The PS2 version was released in North America on 20 June, followed by UK on 4 July, and 7 July in mainland Europe. In Australia, it was released the following year on 28 May 2004. The Windows version was released in North America on 1 July, in Europe on 4 July, and in Australia on 16 July. A Collector's Edition was released in Europe as a Game exclusive and in North America through EB Games; the edition featured a documentary on the game, a CD of music, and promotional material. The PS2 and PC versions were released in Japan by Eidos Interactive on 23 October. For this version, the subtitle was changed to Utsukushiki Tōbō-sha. (Note: (美しき逃亡者; lit. Pretty Fugitive)) A version of the Collector's Edition was included with pre-orders. A port for Mac OS X was developed by Beenox and published by Aspyr on 18 December in North America.

== Reception ==
=== Sales ===
Tomb Raider: The Angel of Darkness received strong initial sales, mostly driven by an aggressive advertising campaign. The game reached 6th place in the UK Top 20 sales charts, but dropped to 13th by the following week. The game's PlayStation 2 version received a "Platinum" sales award from the Entertainment and Leisure Software Publishers Association (ELSPA), indicating sales of at least 300,000 copies in the United Kingdom. It eventually went on to sell 2.5 million copies.

=== Critical response ===
Reception

Aggregate score
Aggregator	Score	
Aggregator	PC	PS2
Metacritic	49/100	52/100

Review scores
Publication	Score	
Publication	PC	PS2
Eurogamer	N/A	4/10
Game Informer	N/A	5.5/10
GameRevolution	N/A	C−
GameSpot	6.1/10	6.5/10
GamesRadar+	N/A	78%
IGN	5.3/10	5.3/10

According to Metacritic, which calculated an average score of 52 and 49 for the PlayStation 2 and Windows version respectively, the game received "mixed or average reviews" and "generally unfavorable reviews". Reviewers praised the game's storyline, graphics, sound, and environments, while they criticised its large number of bugs and system requirements and its poor controls, combat system, and camera movement. Gaming magazine Game Informer gave it 5.5/10, while PlayStation Official Magazine rated it 8/10.

The game's story received positive reviews. IGN's Douglas C. Perry praised its "compelling storyline" and "set of intriguing bit characters", while GameSpot's Greg Kasavin praised the story as "interesting", expressing surprise that it did not earn a higher ESRB rating. Eurogamer's Kristan Reed said that the game's story was of higher quality than to other games. Game Revolution's A. A. White was less positive, stating that while the game's darker story was an improvement compared to its predecessors, it never "[managed] to build to a captivating crescendo", while the reviewer for GamesRadar called it "bountiful but confusing". The music and sound were also highly praised. Perry called it a beautifully scored game, with dramatic mood and feeling, with minimal sound effects adding "a sense of variety and even peculiarity", atmospheric, and the best in the series. Kasavin praised the game for ambient effects, a musical score, and first-rate voice acting.

The reaction to the graphics was mixed. Perry cited multiple examples of good level design, smooth character models, surface textures, and lighting while feeling more mixed about Lara's unrealistic figure and hardened appearance. White cited the graphics as an improvement, but was unimpressed by Lara's character model and noted multiple frame-rate dips that seemed almost like playing the game in slow motion. The GamesRadar review called the graphics an improvement on [Tomb Raider: Chronicles], but not a clean break from the previous Croft titles. Kasavin called the detailing in textures and models "impressive", but cited several points where the game suffered from severe framerate dips. Reed praised the game's graphical polish, with "almost every multi-tiered location crammed with detail and careful incidentals", but critiqued the frequent loading screens and stylised or low detail for environments and characters.

The gameplay was heavily criticised. Perry said that those aspects of the game "pale in comparison to 90% of the PlayStation 2's adventure or action-adventure games, and they actually hurt the rest of the game's best qualities", but that the new moves worked smoothly apart from the stealth actions. White criticised the new layout's negative effect on gameplay and the poor enemy AI, and Kasavin called the experience "frustrating, difficult, and tedious", though stating that such moments stood out because many areas of the game were thrilling. Reed found the controls dated and the stealth mechanics and strength upgrade system unnecessary, while the GamesRadar reviewer cited both the gameplay and control layout as dated, citing the difficulty of effectively controlling Lara at multiple points in the game because of these issues. The camera was also criticised, with White, Perry, Reed, Kasavin and the GamesRadar reviewer all citing it as awkward to control and sometimes wayward or confusing during its scripted movements.

== Legacy ==
In 2010, GameTrailers placed the game 5th in their "Top 10 Worst Sequels" list. The Angel of Darkness caused multiple problems for the Tomb Raider franchise. Paramount Pictures faulted The Cradle of Life's lacklustre box office performance on the poor critical reception the video game received from reviewers and fans. Shortly after the game's release, Jeremy Heath-Smith, managing director at Core Design and development director at Eidos Interactive, would leave both companies with immediate effect, and plans for a sequel called The Lost Dominion, part of a proposed trilogy created using the game's engine, were scrapped.

Top Cow Productions, publishers of the Tomb Raider comic series, partnered with Eidos to adapt the storyline of Angel of Darkness across issues 32, 33 and 34 between July 30 and October 29, 2003. The events of Angel of Darkness were later adapted into Lara Croft Tomb Raider: The Action Adventure, an interactive DVD. Developed by Little Worlds Studio in France, it was released on 8 November 2006 by Bright Entertainment.

Following the poor performance of both the game and the second film, Eidos transferred the production of the next Tomb Raider game from Core Design to another Eidos subsidiary, Crystal Dynamics, noted as the developers of the Legacy of Kain series. Core Design would never release another Tomb Raider title. The studio remained attached to the franchise until 2006, when a remake of the original game for the PSP entitled 10th Anniversary was cancelled, and Core Design sold to Rebellion Developments and renamed to Rebellion Derby. The studio was ultimately shut down in 2010.

In later years, The Angel of Darkness was noted for using or experimenting with multiple gameplay features that later became commonplace, such as the RPG elements, stamina meter and mixing atmospheric features from different video game genres. In 2021, an unofficial fan remake, titled The Angel of Darkness 1.5, was revealed to be in development as a revamped collaboration between developer Julian Guba and character model creator Konrad Majewski with the Unreal Engine 4.

The Angel of Darkness was re-released as part of Tomb Raider IV–VI Remastered, a high-definition remaster for Nintendo Switch, PlayStation 4, PlayStation 5, Windows, Xbox One, and Xbox Series X/S. Released on 14 February 2025, it is being developed and published by Aspyr in partnership with Crystal Dynamics. The remaster includes options for new control schemes, and revamped graphics. The remastered version restores cut dialogue and some gameplay mechanics related to Lara and Kurtis.
