= Herdy Gerdy =

2002 video game

- North American cover art
- Developer: Core Design
- Publisher: Eidos Interactive
- Producer: Clint Nembhard
- Programmer: Chris Long
- Artist: David Pate
- Composers: Martin Iveson; Peter Connelly
- Platform: PlayStation 2
- Release: EU: 22 February 2002; NA: 4 March 2002; JP: 9 January 2003
- Genres: Strategy, puzzle, action-adventure, platform
- Mode: Single-player

Herdy Gerdy is an action-adventure platforming strategy puzzle video game for the PlayStation 2 console, released in 2002. It is developed by Core Design and published by Eidos Interactive. The game involves herding animals, navigating obstacles, and solving puzzles. The player has to collect a variety of herding tools, and there are alternate pathways to reach the end.

== Gameplay ==
The game is best described as a virtual shepherd simulation, with some adventure and platform elements. The player must herd enough creatures into their pens to unlock areas and new levels. However, the various creatures have certain reactions and skills; some swim while some drown, for example. The levels themselves are difficult to negotiate, with pirate ships, winding caverns, and ruins blocking Gerdy's path. The creatures are controlled by a complex but flawed artificial intelligence. They are prone to getting stuck, sometimes irretrievably, on objects in the environment owing to a lack of adequate collision detection.

The game has a large environment (around 40 different areas) as well as 12 different fictional creatures to herd into their different pens. It requires strategic thinking, as some animals eat others, some animals cannot jump, some cannot swim, and each kind requires a separate herding technique. The heads-up display is relatively simple: there are three colored displays at the top of the screen. To the left, the display shows the number of dead animals. The next, in the centre of the screen, represents those alive and free, and the display on the right shows those that have been captured.

Herdy Gerdy is plagued by automatic camera problems. Although the game features manual camera control, when the view between Gerdy and the camera is obstructed control reverts to automatic often to the chagrin of the player. At the bottom of the screen is a progress bar with dots: each dot confirms that you have captured 5% of the animals in the level. Finally, the map shows the player's position, animals, pens, rainbow buttons, and the gypsy at the end of the level.

== Development ==
Herdy Gerdy underwent development for several platforms before its eventual PlayStation 2 release. In February 1998, German magazine Sega Magazin reported that Core Design was developing the game in connection with Sega's forthcoming console, later released as the Dreamcast. A 2002 retrospective in The Tufts Daily reported that development had originally begun for the Nintendo 64 before moving to the Dreamcast and subsequently the PlayStation 2.

== Plot ==
The game begins with young Gerdy awakening in his home on the morning he and his father are set to depart for the great herding tournament. Gerdy springs out of bed, agitated that he and his father have overslept. However, he finds his father unable to wake up.

Upon seeking the advice of the elder Yggdrasil, Gerdy learns that his father has been placed under a spell by the evil Sadorf. Sadorf knew Gerdy's father, Master Gedryn, was the only one who could defeat him at The Tournament. The winner of The Tournament is given an Acorn, which holds the source of all magic on the Island, something Sadorf wishes to have complete control of. Yggdrasil tasks Gerdy with taking his father's place in The Tournament.

From there, Gerdy must journey across the Island to get to The Tournament, learning how to herd various creatures along the way. The journey encompasses many biomes and sections of the Island, as Gerdy gathers magical herding instruments and articles of clothing along the way.

Eventually, Gerdy makes it through the Island's forests to arrive in Foxtown, a port from which guests and contestants depart for Tournament Island. Gerdy hitches a ride with a friendly baker, and makes it to Tournament Island just in time to compete. From there, he must use all the skills he's acquired throughout his journey to beat Sadorf's best herding times, and claim the Acorn for himself. He then awakens his father, and celebrates victory with all the allies he's met along the way. The game ends with Gerdy winking at the camera.

== Levels ==
- Gerdy's Hut
- Meadow Village; Yggdrasil's Tree
- Valley Floor; The Mill; Daisy Patch
- Midmear; Red's Arena
- The Elven Wood
- Goldmine Gorge
- Belder's Spring
- Mountain Pass
- Moonlit Peaks; Poric's Cave
- Forest Glade
- Crystal Lake; Mole's Workshop
- The Ancient Temple
- Pirate Cove
- Skrag's Nest
- The Great Forest
- The Lost Bear
- Beaver Creek
- Foxtown Bridge
- Foxtown; Foxtown Docks
- Tournament Island; The Tournament

== Items ==
- Magic Herding Stick: When placed in grass or snow, Doops and Bleeps will gather around it instead of wandering off.
- Magic Boots: Allows Gerdy to run faster and jump higher.
- Magic Flute: When played, Bleeps, Honks, Drummer Ants, Grimps, and Glooters will follow Gerdy.
- Elven Horn: When blown, smaller herding creatures will scatter. Gromps will drop what they're doing to chase Gerdy. Grimps will be temporarily dazed. Sleeping NPCs will awaken.
- Magic Feather: Makes Gerdy light enough to climb ladders.
- Magic Hammer: Allows Gerdy to hit Rainbow Switches, activating doors, bridges, gates, or creature pens.
- Magic Gloves: Allows Gerdy to push heavy blocks with paw prints on the side.
- Magic Swimsuit: Allows Gerdy to swim.

== Herding Creatures ==
- Doops: Small, chicken-like animals. The most basic herding creature. They must be chased to be herded. Up to 15 can fit in one pen. Doops can be eaten by Gromps and Grimps and can be killed by Warrior Ants. They will die if they fall from too high of a height. They can float down streams, but cannot swim against currents. They will gather around the Magic Herding Stick when placed. The Magic Flute has no effect on them. They will scatter when the Elven Horn is blown. Running too fast while chasing them will cause them to scatter. They appear as green dots on the mini-map.
- Bleeps: Small, blue/purple, bipedal cat-like animals with propeller tails. The Magic Flute must be played to herd them. Up to 8 Bleeps will follow at one time, and up to 8 Bleeps will fit in one pen. Bleeps can be eaten by Gromps and Grimps and can be killed by Warrior Ants. They can fall from any height and survive by using their tails as mini helicopters. They will drown in even the shallowest of water. The will gather around the Magic Herding Stick when placed. They will follow in a single file line when the Magic Flute is played. The will scatter when the Elven Horn is blown. They appear as blue dots on the mini-map.
- Gromps: Large, pink, bear-like creatures. An aggressive herding creature. Approaching one will cause it to chase you, after which you will need to lead it over its pen to trap it. Only 1 Gromp can fit in a pen. If the Gromp catches you, it will punch you and launch you to another part of the level. Gromps will eat smaller herding creatures, including Doops, Bleeps, Honks, and Honklings. If a Gromp pen is too close to a Doop or Bleep pen, it will pull out a fishing pole and begin eating the creatures. Gromps cannot jump, and they cannot cross water. Upon meeting, 2 Gromps will fight for 20 seconds, before sitting dazed for another 10 seconds. Eating Blurps will cause the Gromp to be sick for 20 seconds, during which time they cannot chase your or eat your smaller herding creatures. They appear as red dots on the mini-map.
- Honks: Small, yellow, duck-like creatures. The Magic Flute must be played to herd them. Up to 8 Honks will follow at one time, and up to 16 Honks can fit in a pen. Honks can be eaten by Gromps and Grimps. They can survive any fall as long as there is at least a puddle of water beneath them. They can swim against current if they are being herded. They will follow in a single file line when the Magic Flute is played. They will scatter when the Elven Horn is blown. They appear as yellow dots on the mini-map.
- Honklings: Small, green, baby Honks. They start as eggs, which will only hatch when Honks are nearby. You must already be herding Honks to herd Honklings. Up to 8 Honklings will follow you, and only 8 can fit in a pen, as the pen must also be able to hold the 8 Honk parents. Honklings can be eaten by Gromps. Like Honks, they can fall from any height as long as there is a puddle beneath them. They will gather behind Honks in a single file line when the Magic Flute is played. They will scatter when the Elven Horn is blown. They appear as yellow dots on the mini-map.
- Drummer Ants: Small ants, which play a drum. They are only seen at Goldmine Gorge. They come in shades of red and orange. The Magic Flute must be played to herd them. They are not aggressive, but are necessary to lead Warrior Ants which are aggressive. A red Drummer Ant must be herded to herd red Warrior Ants and an orange Drummer Ant must be herded to herd orange Warrior Ants. They must also be herded to the correctly colored ant hill. They appear as red or orange dots on the mini-map.
- Warrior Ants: Small ants, which carry spears. They are only seen at Goldmine Gorge. They come in shades of red and orange. They will only follow if the player is already herding a Drummer Ant of a matching color. They are highly aggressive, and will kill Doops and Bleeps. They must be brought to the correctly colored ant hill. They appear as red or orange dots on the mini-map.
- Grimps: Small, black, vicious creatures. An aggressive herding creature. The Magic Flute must be played to herd them. Up to 9 Grimps will follow at one time, and up to 9 Grimps can fit in a pen. If you are not playing the Magic Flute around them, they will chase you and eat you if they catch you. If they eat you, their position on the map will be reset, and you will reappear just out of their range. Grimps will eat smaller herding creatures such as Doops, Bleeps, and Honks. They will follow in bunches when the Magic Flute is played. They will temporarily be dazed when they fall from high heights, or if the Elven Horn is blown. They appear as purple dots on the mini-map.
- Glooters: Small, purple, rat-like creatures. They are only seen at Foxtown. The Magic Flute must be played to herd them. Up to 10 Glooters will follow you, and up to 20 Glooters will fit in a pen. They do not interact with heights or water. They will follow in a single file line when the Magic Flue is played. They do not interact with other herding creatures. They appear as purple dots on the mini-map.
- Blurps: Small, purple, hedgehog-like creatures. They are not a herding creature. They can used to make Gromps temporarily sick. When the Elven Horn is blown, they curl into balls that can be kicked to other locations. They do not appear on the mini-map.

== Reception ==
Reception

Aggregate scores
Aggregator	Score
GameRankings	69.93%
Metacritic	69/100

Herdy Gerdy received mixed to positive reviews from critics. It has an aggregate score of 69.93% on GameRankings and 69/100 on Metacritic.
