= Gabbari necropolis =

Ancient site in Alexandria, Lower Egypt

Coordinates: 31°10′24″N 29°53′02″E

The Gabbari Necropolis is an Alexandria's City of the Dead in Lower Egypt. It is described as a site "of the utmost importance for the preservation of the cultural heritage" and one of the world's largest necropoli. The necropolis is for the dead of middle classes of the first generations of Alexandria (3 BCE); however the discoveries are unpredictable. Archeologists have so far found funerary dining rooms only 20 inches beneath the soil's surface, and 33 feet deeper a huge, seven-level tomb was discovered. The area of Gabbari Necropolis is now known locally with the name of "Kom El Malh"

== Discovery ==
The necropolis was discovered by chance in June 1997, during road work in the western part of the Alexandria district of Gabbari at the exit of the port's gate 27. The team of archaeologists of Centre d'études Alexandrines (CEA) directed by Jean-Yves Empereur worked in the site from 1997 till 2000, later a publication of two volumes (Necropolis 1, Necropolis 2) were published by IFAO Institut Français d'Archéologie Orientale. The first volume covers the excavation done in 1997 with details about the architecture of tombs and the other antiques found there, the second covers other sections of the excavation. There are versions of the two volumes at the library of Centre d'études alexandrines in Alexandria; 50 Soliman Youssry st. Moharam Bek

== Antiques found ==
The necropolis was one of the sights on the itinerary of travelers in past centuries, it has numerous loculi (burial niches hollowed out of the walls) closed with limestone slab sealed with plaster, however it was later reopened and another corpse placed beside the first one; one loculi contained up to ten skeletons. Some of the loculis were covered with painted architectural decoration with some numbers, names or words of encouragement to the dead for their long journey "Dionysia, you worthy woman, farewell". At the back of some loculi there's a passage made by tomb-robbers in previous centuries. Other antiques found during excavation like lamps, amphora, ceramic and painted decoration.
