= Peter Connelly =

Video game composer and sound designer

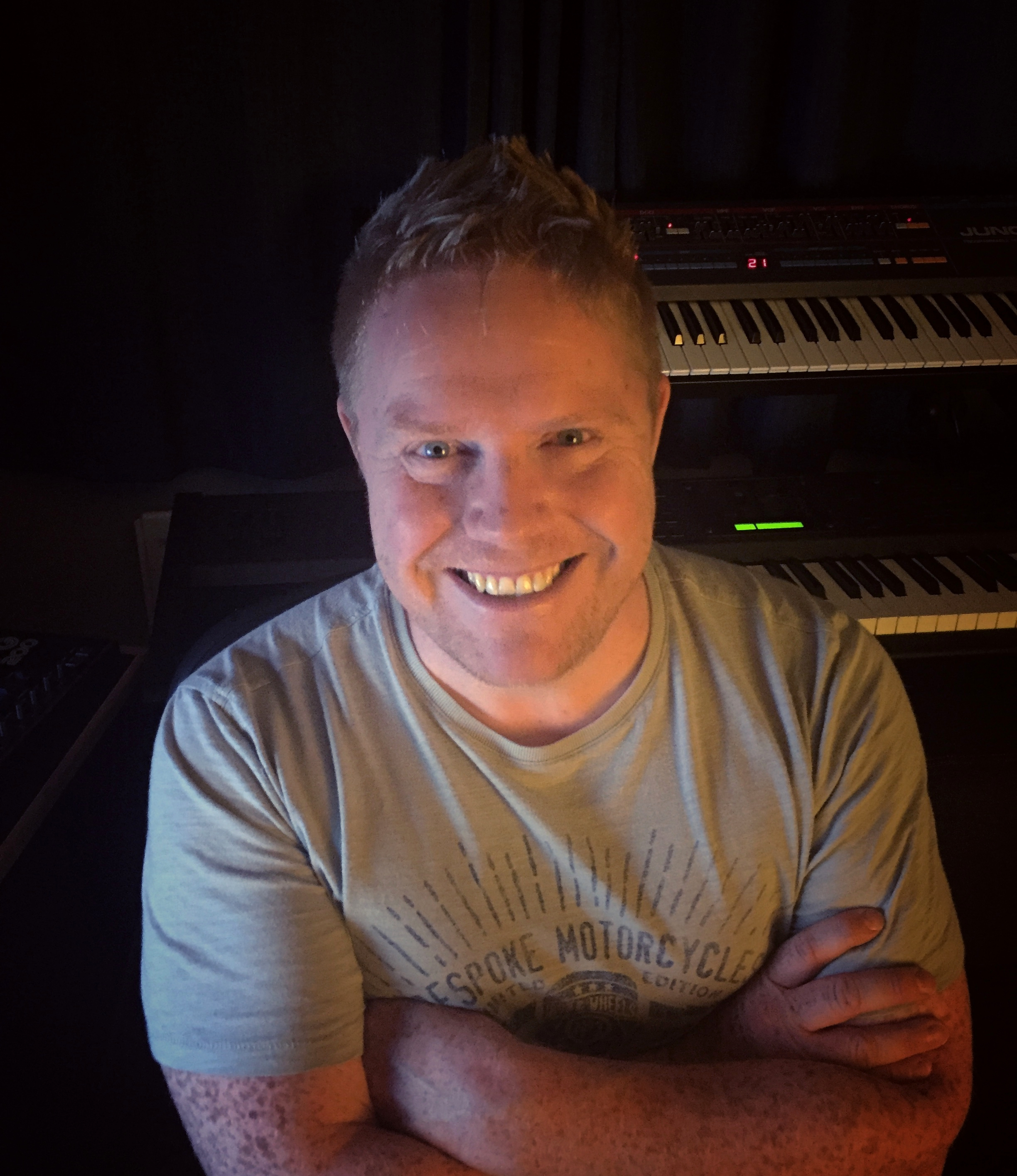
- Connelly in September 2016

Background information
- Born: September 8, 1972 (age 53); South Shields, Tyne and Wear, England
- Genres: Orchestral; electronic; electro-acoustic
- Occupations: Music composer; sound designer
- Instruments: Keyboard; piano; guitar; cello
- Years active: 1995–present
- Labels: Eidos Interactive; Square Enix; Ubisoft; Activision; Electronic Arts
- Website: peterconnelly.com

Peter Connelly is a British video game composer and sound designer known for his work on the action-adventure Tomb Raider series. He has been part of several video game releases working mainly with Core Design, Eutechnyx and Ubisoft.

== Career ==
In September 1998, Connelly joined Derby-based studio Core Design, a subsidiary of UK video game publisher Eidos Interactive. As part of Core Design, Connelly worked in sound design on Tomb Raider III: Adventures of Lara Croft and later as a leading composer for Tomb Raider: The Last Revelation and Tomb Raider: Chronicles. Tomb Raider: The Angel of Darkness, which Connelly co-wrote with Martin Iveson, featured the London Symphony Orchestra.

Connelly has scored other commercial games at Core Design such as Herdy Gerdy, Smart Bomb, and Free Running. At Ubisoft Reflections, developers of the Driver series, Connelly worked as senior sound designer on Driver: San Francisco. After completion of Driver, Connelly was contracted as Audio Lead and Composer on both Watch Dogs and The Crew. Connelly is currently a contractor with Slightly Mad Studios, working as Senior Sound Designer. Connelly also runs Peter Connelly Limited, a sound production studio.

According to Tomb Raider Chronicles, Connelly has cited John Williams and Danny Elfman as “exceptional” soundtrack composers who have influenced his own work. Another influence is Burt Bacharach.

Connelly's experience with the London Symphony Orchestra while working on Tomb Raider: The Angel of Darkness was a significant milestone in his career. The recording sessions took place at Abbey Road Studios in 2002. Working with the LSO was an unexpected dream come true for Connelly, especially given the time constraints for recording. The orchestra's ability to sight-read and precisely execute the music with minimal takes was highly impressive. Connelly described the live performance of the Angel of Darkness theme by the LSO as incomparable to any recording.

== Fraud conviction ==
On 17 July 2025, Peter Connelly was jailed for 16 months for fraudulently applying for a COVID loan. Connelly overstated his company’s turnover and obtained a second Bounce Back Loan of £37,500 in 2020 when businesses were only entitled to a single loan. Connelly told investigators he had taken out the loans to fund a project to reimagine the Tomb Raider soundtrack, which he thought would be potentially lucrative. The project never came to fruition, his company went into liquidation in August 2021 without repaying either loan, while Connelly himself entered into an individual voluntary arrangement (IVA) to avoid personal bankruptcy in June 2022.

== Works ==
=== Music and sound design ===
- The Crew (2014) (with Joseph Trapanese)
- Watch Dogs (2014)
- Horrid Henry (2009)
- SpeedZone/Wheelspin' (2009)
- Garden Party (2008)
- Smart Bomb (2005)
- Podz (2004)
- Tomb Raider: The Angel of Darkness(2003) (with Martin Iveson)
- Herdy Gerdy (2002) (with Martin Iveson)
- Tomb Raider: Chronicles (2000)
- Tomb Raider: The Last Revelation (1999)
- Flesh Feast (1998)
- Mass Destruction (1997)
- Risk II (1996)
- Battleship (1996)

=== Audio director and sound design ===
- Hot Wheels: Beat That! (2007)
- Pimp My Ride (2008)
- Cartoon Network Racing (2007)
- Fast and Furious Tokyo Drift (2006)
- Hummer Badlands (2005)

=== Sound design ===
- Driver: San Francisco (2011) (as senior sound designer)
- PopStar Guitar (2008)

=== Additional sound design ===
- Ferrari Challenge: Trofeo Pirelli (2008)
- Free Running (2007)
- Tomb Raider III (1998)

=== Orchestral arrangement ===
- Emergency Heroes (2008)

== Recent work ==
Peter is currently engaged producing Tomb Raider: The Dark Angel Symphony.

Working alongside Peter on The Dark Angel Symphony are, among others, Dr Richard Niles (arranger, conductor); virtuoso cellist Tina Guo, known for her work in Wonder Woman and alongside Hans Zimmer on his live shows; and vocalist Julie Elven whose previous work includes League of Legends and Horizon: Zero Dawn. The album's executive producer and communications lead is Ash Kapriélov, declared "Lara's Biggest Fan" in Retro Gamer (Issue 163) for his dedicated work for the Tomb Raider video game franchise.

== See also ==
- Tomb Raider#Music

Preceded by Nathan McCree	Tomb Raider composer 1998–2003	Succeeded by Troels Brun Folmann
