= Tomb Raider IV–VI Remastered =

2025 video game collection

- Developer: Aspyr (Note: Original games developed by Core Design. Additional development by Crystal Dynamics and Saber Interactive.)
- Publisher: Aspyr
- Series: Tomb Raider
- Platforms: Nintendo Switch; PlayStation 4; PlayStation 5; Windows; Xbox One; Xbox Series X/S
- Release: WW: 14 February 2025
- Genre: Action-adventure
- Mode: Single-player

Tomb Raider IV–VI Remastered is a 2025 collection of action-adventure games developed and published by Aspyr. It is a remastered compilation of three games in the Tomb Raider series originally developed by Core Design: The Last Revelation (1999), Chronicles (2000), and The Angel of Darkness (2003).

Tomb Raider IV–VI Remastered began production after the release of Tomb Raider I–III Remastered (2024), the team taking player feedback into account. The team wanted to preserve the darker atmosphere of the three games through the remastering process. For Angel of Darkness, several pieces of content cut during that game's original development were restored, including voice lines and gameplay elements.

Tomb Raider IV–VI Remastered was released for Nintendo Switch, PlayStation 4, PlayStation 5, Windows, Xbox One, and Xbox Series X/S on 14 February 2025. The collection of games received mixed reviews from critics.

== Gameplay ==
Tomb Raider IV–VI Remastered is a collection of remasters of three games in the Tomb Raider series: Tomb Raider: The Last Revelation, Tomb Raider: Chronicles, and Tomb Raider: The Angel of Darkness. Like the previous Tomb Raider titles, each game features archaeologist-adventurer Lara Croft exploring a majority of locations in search of ancient artifacts, and is presented from a third-person perspective. As with the original games, Lara is equipped with two pistols with infinite ammo by default and can run, walk (which prevents her from falling off ledges), look around areas, climb, monkey swing using suitable overhead surfaces, crawl through narrow spaces, roll, and jump across gaps.

== Development and release ==
Tomb Raider IV–VI Remastered was co-developed by Saber Interactive and publisher Aspyr. The two had previously worked on Tomb Raider I–III Remastered (2024), a collection of remasters of Core Design's first three Tomb Raider titles in partnership with Crystal Dynamics. Aspyr was already intending to remaster all the Core Design-era Tomb Raider titles before the release of I–III Remastered, with the first remaster's positive response confirming them in their decision. The team took player feedback into account, adding more options to photo mode, and including the original graphics as an option. The collection also includes the "Times Exclusive" level, a rare extra promotional level released for The Last Revelation.

According to Aspyr brand manager Matthew Ray, the team took a "unique approach" to the atmospheric graphical updates as The Last Revelation, Chronicles and The Angel of Darkness had a darker and more story-driven tone than the earlier Tomb Raider titles. The goal with graphical updates was improving and enhancing them without taking away the established art style. For The Angel of Darkness, several additions were made including restored gameplay elements and areas, cut voice lines, and abilities unique to second player character Kurtis Trent.

Ahead of the release of the first compilation, Aspyr product director Chris Bashaar stated in an interview that they expressed interest in making more Tomb Raider remasters in the future, including The Last Revelation and Chronicles. The game was revealed by Crystal Dynamics and Aspyr on 11 October 2024, and was announced to be released for Nintendo Switch, PlayStation 4, PlayStation 5, Windows, Xbox One, and Xbox Series X/S on 14 February 2025.

=== Use of AI generated voice work ===
After launch, fans noted that some of the dialogue in French sounded robotic and artificial. Françoise Cadol, a French voice actress for Lara, accused Aspyr of using generative AI to replicate her voice without her consent. Her lawyer issued a formal cease-and-desist notice to the company. After similar accusations from the Brazilian voice actress Lene Bastos, Aspyr issued a formal apology and stated that they would remove AI generated voice lines from the game. A hotfix issued in September removed the AI voices while keeping the other elements of the patch.

== Reception ==
Reception

Aggregate scores
Aggregator	Score
Metacritic	(PC) 70/100 (PS5) 65/100 (XSXS) 62/100
OpenCritic	47%

Review scores
Publication	Score
Destructoid	7.5/10
Eurogamer	4/5
Nintendo Life	6/10
Push Square	7/10
The Guardian	3/5

Tomb Raider IV–VI Remastered received "mixed or average" reviews from critics, according to review aggregator website Metacritic. OpenCritic determined that 47% of critics recommended the game.
