= Smart Bomb (video game) =

2005 video game

- Developer: Core Design
- Publisher: Eidos Interactive
- Designer: Jamie Morton
- Composer: Peter Connelly
- Platform: PlayStation Portable
- Release: NA: May 10, 2005
- Genres: Strategy, puzzle
- Modes: Single-player, multiplayer

Smart Bomb is a 2005 timed puzzle video game for the PSP developed by Core Design. It was one of the first video games to be released on the PSP and was at first set to be a big game, yet many control flaws and repetition of levels meant that it was a relatively low selling game. This is the last game Core Design worked on before it was renamed Rebellion Derby the following year; R.D. would close its doors in March 2010.

The aim of the game is to defuse a bomb on the screen while the timer counts down, each level is divided into tiers that get closer to the core of the bomb and once successfully defused the player moves on to the next level.

== Gameplay ==
The player is a member of a fictitious Counter Terrorist Unit, who must defuse bombs found in various locations. Each bomb is rigged with a number of puzzles that all must be completed before the timer on the bomb goes off, and thus ending the game.

The player may select the order of the puzzles within each bomb to attempt. There are several different types of puzzles available in the game, including:

- Tile connections: The player must rotate tiles in order to make connections between several pairs of terminals on the outside of the board. While the player is attempting to do this, the bomb will randomly flip tiles around, which the player will need to undo.
- Marble maneuvering: One or more marbles must be guided by tilting the platform the marbles are on to direct them into special locations. There are obstacles such as laser barriers or fans that block paths that must be turned off by directing a marble into special slots (which are then locked to prevent movement while the board is tilted) in order to allow a marble to pass through.
- Gears and belts: The player must arrange a series of gears and belts between gears such that when a handle is turned, the critical gears (one or more depending on the puzzle) must turn at the same time. Some components are fixed in place and must be maneuvered around.
- Lasers and mirrors: The player must arrange a series of mirrors to guide lasers to specific target points on the board. Like the Gears and Belts puzzle, some components are fixed and must be maneuvered around.
- Robot programming: The player must create an arrangement of commands (such as "go forward" or "turn right") to be given to a robot such that the robot will collect all target items on a track in one shot.

While working with these puzzles, special bonuses will pop up and can be collected if the player is fast enough. These power-ups include score bonuses and extra time for completing all the puzzles within the bomb.

There are also special optional puzzles that can also be completed for bonuses.

== Reception ==
Reception

Aggregate score
Aggregator	Score
Metacritic	45/100

Review scores
Publication	Score
Edge	3/10
Electronic Gaming Monthly	2.83/10 (Note: Two critics of Electronic Gaming Monthly gave the game each a score of 3/10, and the other gave it 2.5/10.)
Famitsu	26/40
Game Informer	6/10
GameSpot	4.8/10
GameSpy	2/5
GameZone	4.2/10
IGN	5/10
Official U.S. PlayStation Magazine	1.5/5
X-Play	1/5

The game received "generally unfavorable reviews" according to the review aggregation website Metacritic. IGN stated that the game was aimed at being as fast-paced and frantic as WarioWare, but heavy with complex puzzles instead of quick brain-teasers. GameSpot noted several technical issues with the game such as the game's presentation and sluggish controls. In Japan, where the game was ported for release under the game Baku-No (爆脳) on June 16, 2005, Famitsu gave it a score of two sixes and two sevens for a total of 26 out of 40.
