= Skeleton Krew =

1995 video game

- Sega Mega Drive version
- Developer: Core Design
- Publisher: Core Design (EU) U.S. Gold (US)
- Designers: Guy Miller, Bob Churchill
- Programmers: Jason Gosling, Chris Long
- Artists: James Ryman, Heather Gibson
- Composer: Nathan McCree
- Platforms: Sega Mega Drive, Amiga A1200, Amiga CD32
- Release: 1995
- Genre: Action
- Mode: Single-player

Skeleton Krew is a 1995 video game developed by Core Design for the Sega Mega Drive, Amiga A1200 and Amiga CD32.

== Gameplay ==
Gameplay of Skeleton Krew is represented in an isometric perspective.

Skeleton Krew is a shoot 'em up game played in a scrolling isometric perspective. Gameplay takes place across six stages, with progress saved via a password save system. Players select one of three characters who feature different levels of power and speed, including Joint, who wields a "crash-n-burn" blaster, Rib, who wields a "tri-blast trasher", or Spine, who wields a "pulverax" plasma beam. One of three difficulty levels can be set to adjust the toughness of enemies.

Characters can be moved in eight directions on the ground, and their upper bodies can aim and shoot independently in a different direction. The game's controls allow players to hold or rotate the direction of fire. NuBucks can be collected throughout levels, with the collection of 10,000 NuBucks or a 1-UP icon earning the player an additional life. Skeleton Krew supports a multiplayer mode, allowing two players to simultaneously complete levels.

== Plot ==
In 2062, genetic scientist Moribund Kadaver has taken over a cryogenics facility on behalf of the Deadly Enforcement Aggressive Destruction Inc (DEAD) corporation. Moribund is using the facilities to engineer an army of mutants named Psykogenix and unleashes them on the city. After military forces is slaughtered, the mutants expand across the solar system. The Military Ascertainment Department (MAD) call upon the mercenary Skeleton Krew to defeat the Psykogenix threat.

== Development ==
Skeleton Krew was developed by Core Design. The studio aimed to create a two-player isometric shoot 'em up title. The initial design and visuals were conceived by artist James Ryman, a former Rare staff member. Development began in 1993 with a storyboard and script-writing process, with the studio drafting a design document over a month to set the approach before commencing work on the game. It was showcased at the Chicago Consumer Electronics Show in 1994.

== Reception ==
Reception

Review scores
| Publication | Score | |
| Publication | Amiga | Sega Genesis |
|---|---|---|
| AllGame | | 4/5 |
| Amiga Power | 59% | |
| Game Informer | | 6.25/10 |
| GamePro | | 3.6/5 |
| Mean Machines Sega | | 83% |
| Amiga CD32 Gamer | 87% | |
| Sega Magazine | | 82% |
| Video Games | | 9/10 |

Skeleton Krew received generally favorable reviews upon release. Critics generally enjoyed the novelty of the isometric presentation, and viewed the game handled well using this perspective. Some considered the controls were effective, with Game Informer viewing they overcame the limitations to diagonal controls on the Mega Drive and that they made for "very accurate aiming". GamePro wrote that aiming shots in this perspective could be confusing and "takes some getting used to", but was easy to handle once mastered.

Reviewers praised the game's presentation as well-executed and distinctive, with Video Games commending the graphics as "fantastic" and that their design enabled levels to have a "flavor of their own". Game Informer viewed the characters to be "poorly defined" and the levels to be "lifeless".
