= Asterix and the Power of the Gods =

1995 video game

- Cover art
- Developer: Core Design
- Publisher: Sega
- Producer: Jeremy Smith
- Designer: Simon Phipps
- Programmer: Stefan Walker
- Artist: Richard Morton
- Composer: Nathan McCree
- Platform: Sega Mega Drive
- Release: PAL: April 21, 1995
- Genre: Platform
- Mode: Single-player

Asterix and the Power of the Gods is a 1995 platform game for the Sega Mega Drive based on the comic book series Asterix, most notably Asterix and the Chieftain's Shield.

== Plot ==
In Gaul, Vercingetorix was defeated by Julius Caesar and his Roman army. The shield was lost to the invading Romans and Asterix must liberate the shield from their control.

== Gameplay ==
Players must guide Asterix through different levels. An isometric map is used to enter different levels. Asterix has the ability to run, jump, and defeat enemies by directly hitting them.

Players can talk to non-player characters. Other people's houses can be visited in search of clues.

== Reception ==
Reception

Review scores
Publication	Score
Consoles +	85%
Computer and Video Games	89/100
Jeuxvideo.com	12/20
Mean Machines Sega	90/100
Mega Fun	58%
Mega	76%
Sega Magazine	72%
Sega Power	30%
Sega Pro	85%

== See also ==
- List of Asterix games
