= Tomb Raider (1996 video game) =

1996 video game

- European cover art
- Developer: Core Design (Note: Mac OS port developed by Aspyr, N-Gage and Pocket PC ports by Ideaworks3D, and mobile ports by Square Enix.)
- Publisher: Eidos Interactive (Note: Japanese Saturn and PlayStation versions published by Victor Interactive Software, Pocket PC version by Handango, and mobile ports by Square Enix.)
- Programmer: Paul Douglas
- Artist: Toby Gard
- Writer: Vicky Arnold
- Composer: Nathan McCree
- Series: Tomb Raider
- Platforms: Sega Saturn; MS-DOS; PlayStation; N-Gage; Pocket PC iOS; Android
- Release: Sega Saturn: EU: 24 October 1996; NA: 14 November 1996; MS-DOS, PlayStation: NA: 14 November 1996; EU: 22 November 1996; Mac OS: WW: 16 March 1999; Pocket PC: NA: July 2002; N-Gage: NA: 7 October 2003; EU: 10 October 2003; iOS: WW: 16 December 2013; Android: WW: 1 April 2015
- Genre: Action-adventure
- Mode: Single-player

Tomb Raider is a 1996 action-adventure game developed by Core Design and published by Eidos Interactive as the debut entry in the Tomb Raider media franchise. It was first released on the Sega Saturn, followed shortly by versions for MS-DOS and the PlayStation. Later releases came for Mac OS (1999), Pocket PC (2002), N-Gage (2003), iOS (2013) and Android (2015). The game follows archaeologist-adventurer Lara Croft, who is hired by businesswoman Jacqueline Natla to find an artefact called the Scion of Atlantis. Gameplay features Lara navigating levels split into multiple areas and room complexes while fighting enemies and solving puzzles to progress.

The initial concept was created by Toby Gard, who is credited as Lara's creator and worked as lead artist on the project. Production began in 1994 and took 18 months, with a budget of £440,000. The character of Lara was based on several influences, including Tank Girl, Indiana Jones, and Hard Boiled. The 3D grid-based level design, innovative for its time, was inspired by the structure of Egyptian tombs. The music was composed by Nathan McCree, who took inspiration from English classical music. Originally announced in 1995, the title went on to receive extensive press attention and heavy promotion from Eidos Interactive. An expansion pack subtitled Unfinished Business was released in 1998, containing new standalone levels.

Tomb Raider was praised for its innovative 3D graphics, controls, and gameplay. The game went on to win several industry awards and is considered to be one of the greatest video games ever made. It is also one of the best-selling games for the PlayStation, with seven million units sold worldwide, and it remained the best-selling title in the Tomb Raider franchise until the 2013 reboot. Lara Croft herself became a cultural icon, rising to prominence as one of gaming's most recognisable characters. Following the game's success, numerous sequels were released, beginning with Tomb Raider II in 1997. Two remakes have been developed; Tomb Raider: Anniversary (2007), and the upcoming Tomb Raider: Legacy of Atlantis (2027). A remastered version of Tomb Raider, alongside Unfinished Business, was released as part of Tomb Raider I–III Remastered in 2024.

== Gameplay ==
Lara Croft retrieves the first piece of the Scion in the Tomb of Qualopec.

Tomb Raider is an action-adventure video game in which the player assumes the role of archaeologist-adventurer Lara Croft, who navigates through a series of ancient ruins and tombs in search of an ancient artefact. The game is split into four zones: Peru, Greece, Egypt and the lost island of Atlantis. A training level set in Lara's home of Croft Manor can be accessed from the start menu. The game is presented in third-person perspective. Lara is always visible, and the camera follows the action by focusing on Lara's shoulders by default, but the player can take manual control of the camera to get a better look at an area. The game automatically switches to a different camera view at key points, either to give the player a wider look at a new area or to add a cinematic effect. In the Sega Saturn and PlayStation versions, players save their progress in a level using Save Crystals, while in the PC versions the player can save at any point. If Lara dies, the player must restart from a previous save.

The object of Tomb Raider is to guide Lara through a series of tombs and other locations in search of treasures and artefacts. On the way, she must kill dangerous animals and creatures while collecting objects and solving puzzles. The emphasis lies on exploring, solving puzzles, and navigating Lara's surroundings to complete each level. Movement in the game is varied and allows for complex interactions with the environment. In addition to standard movement using tank controls, Lara can walk, jump over gaps, shimmy along ledges, and swim through bodies of water. Certain button combinations allow Lara to either perform a handstand from a hanging position or execute a swandive.

Lara has two basic stances: one with weapons drawn and one with her hands-free. When her weapons are drawn, she automatically locks on to any nearby targets. Locking onto nearby targets prevents her from performing other actions which require her hands, such as grabbing onto ledges to prevent falling. By default, she carries two pistols with infinite ammo. Additional weapons include a shotgun, dual magnums, and dual Uzis. A general action button is used to perform a wide range of movements, such as picking up items, pulling switches, firing guns, pushing or pulling blocks, and grabbing onto ledges. Items to pick up include ammo, small and large medi-packs, keys, and artefacts required to complete a stage. Any item that is collected is held onto in Lara's inventory until it is used. Throughout each stage, one or more secrets may be located. Discovering these secrets is optional, and when the player finds one a tune plays. The locations of these secrets vary in difficulty to reach. The player is usually rewarded with extra items.

== Plot ==
Archaeologist-adventurer Lara Croft is approached by a mercenary named Larson, who is working for businesswoman Jacqueline Natla. Natla hires Lara to acquire the Scion, a mysterious artefact buried in the tomb of Qualopec, situated near Vilcabamba within the Peruvian Andes. After recovering the Scion from Qualopec's tomb, Lara is ambushed by Larson, who reveals after his defeat that she is holding merely a piece of the artefact, and Natla has sent rival treasure hunter Pierre DuPont to retrieve the other pieces. Breaking into Natla's offices to find out Pierre's whereabouts, Lara discovers a medieval monk's diary, and learns that the Scion is a powerful artefact composed of three pieces, which were divided between the three rulers of the ancient continent of Atlantis, and one of these pieces is buried alongside former Atlantean ruler Tihocan, beneath an ancient monastery, St. Francis' Folly, in Greece.

Navigating the monastery, and following several firefights with Pierre, Lara locates the tomb of Tihocan, where she kills Pierre and recovers the second piece of the Scion he had taken. From a mural, she learns that Tihocan unsuccessfully tried to resurrect Atlantis after a catastrophe struck the original continent. After combining both pieces of the Scion, Lara is shown a vision that reveals the third and final piece of the Scion was hidden in Egypt after the third Atlantean ruler, a traitor who used the artefact to create a breed of monsters, was captured and imprisoned by Tihocan and Qualopec. Making her way through Egypt to the lost city of Khamoon, Lara kills Larson and recovers the third Scion piece.

Emerging from the caves, Lara is ambushed by Natla and her three henchmen, who take the Scion. Lara escapes and stows away aboard Natla's yacht, which takes her to an uncharted island where an Atlantean pyramid filled with monsters is located. After dispatching Natla's henchmen and making her way through the pyramid, Lara finds the Scion and sees the rest of the vision, revealing Natla to be the betrayer. Lara faces Natla, who reveals that she intends to use her army to push forward humanity's evolution, as she believes both Atlantis and current civilisation are too soft to withstand disaster. Lara decides to destroy the Scion, and Natla's attempt to stop her sends her into a crevasse. After fighting a large legless monster, Lara shoots the Scion, setting off a chain reaction that begins to destroy the pyramid. Lara kills a winged Natla and escapes the exploding island.

== Development ==
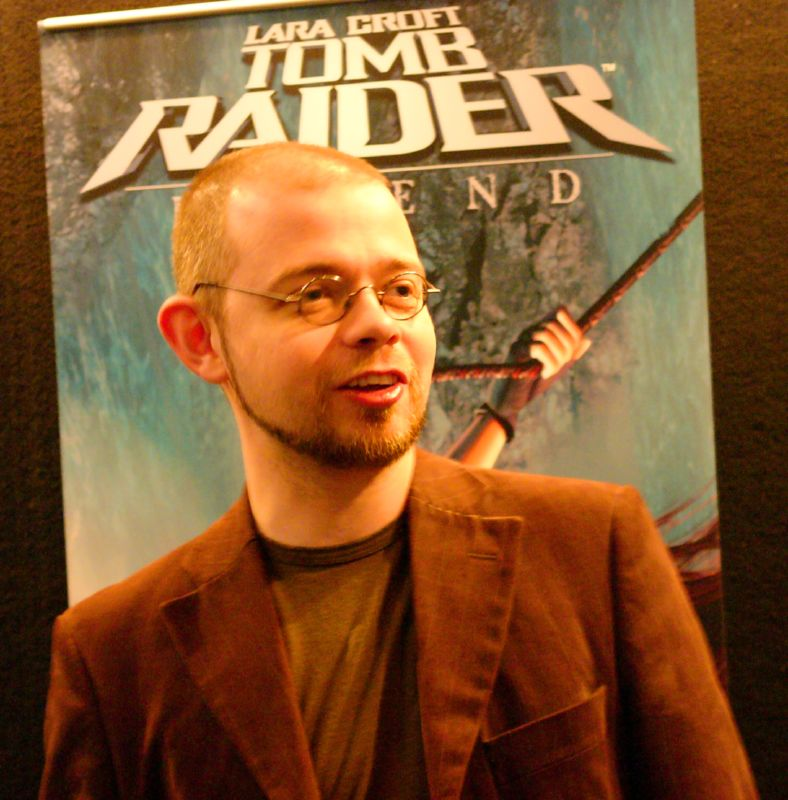
Toby Gard at the 2005 Electronic Entertainment Expo

The initial concept for Tomb Raider was created by Toby Gard, who worked for Core Design, a game development studio based in Derby, England, that had established itself developing titles for home computers and Sega consoles. It was proposed by Gard to company head Jeremy Heath-Smith during a 1994 brainstorming session for game concepts for the then-upcoming PlayStation console. The entire staff approved, and Heath-Smith gave Gard permission to start the project once he finished work on BC Racers for the Sega CD. The game concept was created before anything else, with the main hooks being its cinematic presentation and being a 3D character-driven experience.

Gard worked with Paul Douglas on fleshing out the concept and design and doing pre-production for six months, before the team expanded to six people including programmers Gavin Rummery and Jason Gosling, and level designers/artists Neal Boyd and Heather Gibson. The team wanted to mix the adventuring style of Ultima Underworld and the 3D characters shown off in Virtua Fighter. The team kept the project deliberately simple and comparatively modest in scope, with its development budget being approximately £440,000. The production atmosphere was fairly informal. Development began in 1994 and lasted eighteen months. The team endured excessive overtime and crunch during the last stages. During production, Core Design was sold to CentreGold, which in turn was purchased by Eidos Interactive in May 1996, who became publisher for the title.

When Gard first presented the idea for the game, the concept art featured a male lead who strongly resembled Indiana Jones. Heath-Smith asked for a change for legal reasons. When Gard created the initial design document, he decided to give the player a choice of genders and created a female adventurer alongside the male character. Once he realized creating and animating two playable characters would require double the design work, he decided to slim back down to one. The female character, originally named Laura Cruz, was his favorite, so he discarded the male character before development work began. After Eidos became the game's publisher, they unsuccessfully lobbied for a selectable male lead. Speaking about his approach to the concept, Gard noted that he deliberately went against publisher trends when designing both the character and the gameplay. Laura went through several changes before the developers settled on the final version, including a name change to Lara Croft after Eidos executives in the United States objected to the original name. The inspirations for the character of Lara Croft included the character Tank Girl, the Indiana Jones series' titular lead, and the John Woo film Hard Boiled. Lara's notably exaggerated physical proportions were a deliberate choice by Gard, as he wanted a caricatured personification of women who could be an action icon for the younger generation.

From the game's earliest stages, the team wanted the title to involve tombs and pyramids. In the early story draft, Lara would be confronted by a rival group called the "Chaos Raiders". During the Greece levels, Lara and Pierre were to have been less hostile rivals, helping each other with puzzles in the first level. Larson evolved from an Afrikaans character called Lars Kruger, who shared a similar role in the original plot. The script itself was written by Vicky Arnold, who joined in 1995 and would work on later Tomb Raider titles. Gard and Douglas created the basic story draft alongside the initial game design, then Arnold turned it into a script after joining the project. It was Arnold's job to write the dialogue, and create a cohesive narrative around the locations selected by the team members. While Lara's character design and Gard's initial concept were present, much of the additional detail was worked out by Arnold.

The platforming design drew extensively from Prince of Persia, with the Doppelgänger enemy during the Atlantis section being an homage to the Shadow Prince from that game. The high number of animal enemies was meant to ground players in the world before the more fantastical elements appeared, in addition to being easier to animate and program than human enemies. The staff were also uncomfortable with Lara killing that many humans. The initial concept gave combat prominence, but as production began the focus shifted to platforming and puzzle-solving. A plan that made it into the final product was using enemy placement to shift the atmosphere from pure action-adventure to a horror-like tone. The harder areas, including the Palace Midas levels, and instant death traps have been attributed to Boyd. The team consciously set the story in real archaeological locations representing several cultures. Boyd and Gibson immersed themselves in literature and history about each culture for the first three areas, respectively inspired by the Inca Empire, Classical Greece and Ancient Egypt. The Greece levels were put in after planned levels in Angkor Wat, Cambodia were dropped. The Croft Manor training level was built by Gard over a weekend. Its design was based on pictures of Georgian manor houses taken from an unspecified reference book.

=== Design and platforms ===
The title was developed for Sega Saturn, MS-DOS personal computers (PC), and PlayStation, with all three versions in development simultaneously. Gosling led programming for the Saturn version. Douglas described the game code for each title as identical, with an additional layer of specific coding to tailor the game for each platform. While Sony Europe approved the game early on, making Tomb Raider one of the earliest approved third-party products for the PlayStation, Sony America initially rejected the game's concept and asked for more and better content. Douglas blamed the response on Core Design submitting Tomb Raider too early in production. In response the development team made several changes to the game design documentation and produced a version on Sony hardware which would lead to worldwide approval by Sony. For the Saturn version, Sega negotiated a timed exclusivity deal in Europe, meaning the Saturn version was released in that region ahead of other versions. Core Design and Sega made the deal during the last few months of development, so the team had to finish up the Saturn version six weeks earlier than they had planned, forcing them to work even longer hours.

Following the release of the Saturn version, a number of bugs were discovered that affected all versions of the game; because of the timed exclusivity, the development team fixed these bugs for the PlayStation and PC versions. Two notable surviving bugs in all versions were the "corner bug", which allowed players to scale architecture by jumping repeatedly against a corner; and a bug which caused the game not to recognise the collection of a secret in the final level. In 1997 Core Design opened negotiations with Nintendo to release a Nintendo 64 version of the game and started work on the port in anticipation of the negotiations being successful. The planning took place between 1996 and 1997, with Douglas wanting to redesign the game mechanics to incorporate the platform's analogue stick controls. The team never received Nintendo 64 development kits, and the port was scrapped when Sony finalised a deal to keep subsequent Tomb Raider games exclusive to PlayStation until the year 2000.

A third-person 3D action-adventure like Tomb Raider was unprecedented at the time, and the development team took several months to find a way to make Gard's vision for the game work on the hardware of the time, in particular getting the player character to interact with freeform environments. Tomb Raider used a custom-built game engine, as did many games of the era. The engine was designed and built by Douglas with assistance from Rummery. Rummery created the level editor, which allowed for "seamless" creation of levels. According to Rummery, the decision to build the game levels on a grid was the key breakthrough in making the game possible. It is Core Design's contention that, prior to the development of Tomb Raider, they were "struggling somewhat" with 32-bit development. Lara's movements were hand-animated and coordinated rather than created using motion capture. The reason for this was that the team wanted uniformity in her movement, which was not possible with motion capture technology of the time.

The level editor program was designed so that developers could make rapid adjustments to specific areas with ease. Another noted aspect was the multi-layered levels, as compared to equivalent 3D action-adventure games of the time which were mostly limited to a flat-floor system with little verticality. The interlinking room design was inspired by Egyptian multi-roomed tombs, particularly the tomb of Tutankhamun. The grid-based pattern was a necessity due to the d-pad-based tank controls and the Saturn's quad polygon-based rendering technology. Levels were first designed using a wireframe construction, with each area at this stage having only links to other areas of a level and walls. The team then added architecture and gameplay elements like traps and enemies, then implemented the different lighting values. Due to time and technical limitations, planned outdoor areas had to be cut.

The choice of a third-person perspective was influenced by the team's opinion that the game type was under-represented when compared to first-person shooters such as Doom. The third-person view meant multiple elements were difficult to implement, including the character and camera control. The camera had four pre-set angles, which seamlessly switched depending on the character's position and the level progress. For standard navigation and combat, the camera was fixed on a particular point and oriented around Lara while focusing on that object. Lara's twin pistol set-up was in place from the early prototypes. The aiming system was designed so that each gun arm had an aiming axis, with a shared "sweetspot" where both guns fired at the same target. For underwater environments, the effects were created using gouraud shading to create real-time ripple and lighting effects.

=== Audio ===
The music for Tomb Raider was composed by Nathan McCree, who at the time was an in-house composer for Core Design. The main inspiration behind the score for McCree was English Classical music. This approach was directly influenced by his conversations with Gard about Lara's character. Based on this, he kept the main theme simple and melodic. The main theme used a four-note motif, which continues to appear through the series. The piece "Where The Depths Unfold", used when Lara is swimming underwater, was a choral work. They did not have the space or budget for live music recording, which was challenging for McCree as he needed to create the whole thing using synthesisers. To make the choir sound realistic, he inserted recordings of himself breathing at the right points so it sounded like an actual choir. For each track, McCree got a basic description of where the music would be used, then was left to create it. There was no time for rewrites, so each track was included in the game as first composed.

Unlike most other games of the time, there was not a musical track playing constantly throughout the game; instead, limited musical cues would play only during specially-selected moments to produce a dramatic effect. For the majority of the game, the only audio heard is action-based effects, atmospheric sounds, and Lara's own grunts and sighs, all of which were enhanced because they did not have to compete with music. According to McCree, the game was scored this way because he was allotted very little time for the job, forcing him to quickly write pieces without any thought to where they would go in the game. When the soundtrack was finally applied, the developers found that the tunes worked best when applied to specific places. The symphonic sounds were created using Roland Corporation's Orchestral Expansion board for their JV series keyboards.

English voice actress Shelley Blond provided the voice of Lara. She was given the job after her agent called and had her record some audition lines onto tape. She felt under a lot of pressure at the time, as Core Design had spent three months searching for the right voice. She recalled: "I was asked to perform her voice in a very plain non-emotive manner and in a 'female Bond' type of way. I would have added more inflection, tone and emotion to my voice but they wanted to keep it how they felt it should sound, which was quite right. My job was to bring their character to life".

According to Blond, she spent four to five hours recording the voice for Lara including the grunts, cries and other effort and death sounds. A different account attributes these sounds to Gibson, Core Design's PR Manager Suzie Hamilton, and sound designer Martin Iveson whose voice pitch was made higher. Blond would not return for any subsequent entries. In a 2011 interview Blond stated that her departure was due to disagreeing with "some things" within Core Design and Eidos, but five years later she said that she was asked to reprise her role but had to decline due to other commitments. She gave permission for her effort voice work to be reused while the character's dialogue would be voiced by Judith Gibbins.

== Release and versions ==
Tomb Raider was first confirmed in 1995, although details were kept scarce by the developers. There was little attention from the press until a demo was run at the 1996 Electronic Entertainment Expo, causing the press and public to pay more attention. There was a huge amount of publicity, much of which did not involve the Core Design team at all, which prompted mixed feelings. While the scale of the game's eventual popularity was not in the team's minds, its strong reception at gaming events hinted that it would be a success. To help promote the game, Eidos hired models to portray Lara Croft at trade events. They first hired Natalie Cook, but apparently due to her unsuitability with Eidos's cross-media plans for the character, she was replaced with Rhona Mitra in 1997. Mitra served as Lara's model until 1998. They also organised a large press event during August based around exploring notable Egyptian archaeological sites, an event its organiser Susie Hamilton being amazed they were able to make it work.

The game was first released for Saturn in Europe on 24 October 1996. In North America, the Saturn, PlayStation and MS-DOS versions were released simultaneously on 14 November. In Europe, the PlayStation and MS-DOS versions were released on 22 November. Future PC patches allowed the game to work on Windows 95. The PC version was released on Steam on 29 November 2012. Due to technical limitations of MS-DOS, the PC version came without in-game music. The PlayStation and Saturn versions were also published in Japan in 1997 by Victor Interactive Software under the name Tomb Raiders. The Saturn version was released on 14 January, while the PlayStation version came on 14 February. The PlayStation version was re-released for the PlayStation Network in North America in August 2009, and in Europe in August 2010. An attempt was made by Realtech VR to remaster the first three Tomb Raider titles for Windows, but due to not having asked permission from then-franchise owner Square Enix first, the project was cancelled.

The game was released for Mac OS on 16 March 1999. It was ported to the platform by Aspyr and based on Tomb Raider Gold. A port to the Pocket PC was published by Handango in July 2002. It was released on the N-Gage as a day one launch title on 7 October in North America and 10 October in Europe. Both ports were developed by Ideaworks3D. Tomb Raider was ported to iOS devices, developed and published by Square Enix. The port was released on 17 December 2013, and includes the additional levels of the Gold release. As of August 2024 Tomb Raider is no longer available for purchase on the iOS app store. This version was released on Android devices in April 2015. A version for Evercade was released as part of Tomb Raider Collection 1 in 2024.

Long term interest from fans has also led to a number of unofficial ports. In 2016, developer Timur "XProger" Gagiev began work on OpenLara, an open source port of the original Tomb Raider engine. The further development of this project enabled Tomb Raider to be ported to many modern and legacy systems, such as the 3DO Interactive Multiplayer, 32X, the Xbox, iPhone, and the Nintendo 3DS. In January 2022, a version for the Game Boy Advance was released, which attracted attention from several media outlets.

=== Unfinished Business ===
In spring 1998, four new levels were released in an expansion pack for the Windows version, known under the title Tomb Raider: Unfinished Business. Originally the expansion was planned for release in the summer of 1997 as a purchasable add-on, and would have contained promotional materials for the game's sequel Tomb Raider II. However these plans were apparently scrapped, and the levels were later made available for free as downloadable content for the Windows release without any promotional content. A budget version of the game was later released containing both the original game and the additional levels under the title Tomb Raider Gold. Production on these new levels was led by Phil Campbell, a newcomer who was transferred to Core Design after another project was cancelled. The two new areas were dubbed "Unfinished Business", set within the ruins of the Atlantean pyramid; and "Shadow of the Cat", which saw Lara exploring a temple in Egypt dedicated to the goddess Bastet. "Unfinished Business" was intended as an alternate, more difficult finale to the game featuring more mutant enemies and a focus on complex platforming. The concept for "Shadow of the Cat" was born from a cat statue used in the Khamoon level, with the levels being themed after a cat's nine lives. Due to licensing issues, several later re-releases excluded the Gold content.

== Reception ==
Reception

Aggregate scores
Aggregator	Score			
Aggregator	iOS	PC	PS	Saturn
GameRankings	N/A	92%	90%	87%
Metacritic	55/100	N/A	91/100	N/A

Review scores
Publication	Score			
Publication	iOS	PC	PS	Saturn
Computer and Video Games	N/A	N/A	N/A	5/5
Edge	N/A	9/10	9/10	N/A
Electronic Gaming Monthly	N/A	N/A	8.5/10, 9.5/10, 9.5/10, 9/10	N/A
Famitsu	N/A	N/A	7/10, 7/10, 8/10, 6/10	7/10, 8/10, 8/10, 8/10
GameRevolution	N/A	A	A	A−
GamesMaster	N/A	N/A	N/A	95%
GameSpot	N/A	8.5/10	8.5/10	7.9/10
GameZone	N/A	7/10	N/A	N/A
IGN	N/A	N/A	9.3/10	N/A
Next Generation	N/A	N/A	N/A	5/5
TouchArcade	3/5	N/A	N/A	N/A
Sega Saturn Magazine	N/A	N/A	N/A	92%
Dengeki PlayStation	N/A	N/A	85/100, 90/10, 85/100, 90/100	N/A

Upon its release in 1996, the game was widely praised by video game magazines for its variety and depth of control, revolutionary graphics, intriguing environments, and use of occasional combat to maintain an atmosphere of tension. Ryan MacDonald of GameSpot described the game having the puzzle solving from Resident Evil, the gory action of Loaded, and the ability to have a 360-degree freedom in the gameplay. The game tied with the Saturn version of Street Fighter Alpha 2 for Electronic Gaming Monthly's "Game of the Month", with their review team saying it stood out from other titles and was the PlayStation's best release at the time. Next Generation called it "a thought-provoking, riveting action-adventure easily on par in intensity with any of Hollywood's finest efforts", citing it as a landmark title and potential trend setter for that console generation.

Some critics rated the PlayStation version better than the Saturn version. MacDonald wrote that its graphics were sharper and GamePro scored it half a point higher than the Saturn version in every category despite noting the former's "solid showing". However, Next Generation said that it would not bother to review the PlayStation version because the differences between it and the Saturn version were negligible. Similarly, Electronic Gaming Monthly only reviewed the PlayStation version, and stated in a feature on the game that both versions were playable and enjoyable, while also having identical graphics. A retrospective analysis of the game by Digital Foundry referred to the Saturn version as the least enjoyable version due to lower frame rate and worse audio when compared to the other versions. Next Generation reviewed the PC version of Tomb Raider Gold, rated it three stars out of five, and wrote that it was a suitable purchase for series newcomers, with old players being more likely to download the levels from the game website.

Tomb Raider was Computer Games Strategy Plus's 1996 overall game of the year and won the magazine's award for the year's best "3D Action" game as well. It was a finalist for CNET Gamecenter's 1996 "Best Action Game" award, which went to Quake. Electronic Gaming Monthly named Tomb Raider a runner-up for both "PlayStation Game of the Year" (behind Tekken 2) and "Saturn Game of the Year" (behind Dragon Force), commenting that both versions had been designed to take optimum advantage of each console's capabilities. They named it runner-up for both "Action Game of the Year" (behind Die Hard Trilogy) and "Adventure Game of the Year" (behind Super Mario 64), as well as "Game of the Year" (again behind Super Mario 64). It won "Best Animation" in the 1996 Spotlight Awards.

Less than a year after its release, Electronic Gaming Monthly ranked the PlayStation version of Tomb Raider the 54th-best console video game of all time, particularly citing its vast and compelling areas to explore. In 1998, PC Gamer declared it the 47th-best computer game released, and the editors called it "tremendous fun to play and a legitimate piece of post-modern gaming history". In 2001 Game Informer ranked it the 86th-best game ever made. They praised it for Lara's appeal to gamers and non-gamers alike.

=== Sales and accolades ===
At release, Tomb Raider topped the British charts a record three times, and contributed substantially to the success of the PlayStation. In the previous year, Eidos Interactive had recorded a nearly $2.6 million pre-tax loss. The success of the game turned this loss into a $14.5 million profit in a year. As one of the top-selling games of the PlayStation console, it was one of the first to be released on PlayStation's 'Platinum' series, and its success made Tomb Raider II the most anticipated game of 1997. By 1997, 2.5 million units had been sold worldwide. The Sega Saturn version was also a success, being one of the system top sellers in the Christmas 1996 season. In Germany, the Saturn version topped Karstadt's Saturn sales chart for four consecutive months from March through June 1997.

In August 1998, the game's computer version received a "Platinum" sales award from the Verband der Unterhaltungssoftware Deutschland (VUD), while its PlayStation release took "Gold". These prizes indicate sales of 200,000 and 100,000 units, respectively, across Germany, Austria, and Switzerland. During the first three months of 1997, Tomb Raider was the ninth-best-selling console game in the United States, with sales of 143,000 units. This made it the country's highest-selling PlayStation title for the period. Tomb Raider sold over 7 million copies worldwide. Tomb Raider, along with its successor, Tomb Raider II, were the two best-selling games in the franchise prior to the 2013 reboot.

In 1999, Next Generation listed Tomb Raider as number 22 on its "Top 50 Games of All Time", commenting that the level design and art direction enabled a real feeling of exploration and accomplishment. In 2001, GameSpot listed Tomb Raider on its "15 Most Influential Games of All Time", saying it served as a template for many 3D action-adventure games that would follow and helped drive the market for 3D accelerator cards for PCs. In 2004, the Official UK PlayStation Magazine chose Tomb Raider as the fourth-best game of all time.

It won a multitude of Game of the Year awards from leading industry publications. In 1998, Tomb Raider won the Origins Award for Best Action Computer Game of 1997. In 1999, Toby Gard and Paul Douglas won the Berners-Lee Interactive BAFTA Award for best contribution to the industry for their work creating the franchise. In 2018, The Strong National Museum of Play inducted Tomb Raider to its World Video Game Hall of Fame.

== Legacy ==
The sequel to the game, Tomb Raider II, was in the concept stage as production of Tomb Raider was wrapping up. Under pressure from Eidos Interactive, Core Design would develop a new Tomb Raider annually between 1997 and 2000, putting considerable strain on the team. A total of five sequels were produced, their struggles culminating in the troubled development of Tomb Raider: The Angel of Darkness for PlayStation 2. Releasing to poor critical reception and lackluster sales, Eidos Interactive transferred the franchise to Crystal Dynamics, who would reboot the series in 2006 with Tomb Raider: Legend.

The original game and the Unfinished Business expansion were released as part of Tomb Raider I–III Remastered, a high-definition remaster for Nintendo Switch, PlayStation 4, PlayStation 5, Windows, Xbox One, and Xbox Series X/S. Released on 14 February 2024, it was developed and published by Aspyr in partnership with Crystal Dynamics. The remaster includes options for new control schemes, and revamped graphics.

=== Remakes ===
After the release of Legend, Crystal Dynamics created a remake of Tomb Raider using the Legend engine and continuity. Gard acted as one of the story designers, fleshing out both the main narrative and Lara's characterisation. The remake was co-developed by Crystal Dynamics and Buzz Monkey Software. Titled Tomb Raider: Anniversary, the game released worldwide in 2007 for PlayStation 2, Windows, PlayStation Portable, Xbox 360 and Wii.

A second remake, co-developed by Crystal Dynamics and Flying Wild Hog and published by Amazon Game Studios, was announced in 2025. The remake, set within a "Unified Timeline" continuity, was designed to translate the original game into a modern experience with elements from across Lara's various portrayals up to that point. Titled Tomb Raider: Legacy of Atlantis, the game is set for release in 2027 for PlayStation 5, Windows, Xbox Series X/S and Nintendo Switch 2.

A cancelled remake for PlayStation Portable was in development at Core Design from late 2005 to early 2006, titled 10th Anniversary Edition. Core Design had wanted to remake Tomb Raider for the PSP and PS2, and got permission from Eidos to do so. According to Rummery, Eidos cancelled the project after seeing a demo of the opening for Legend on PSP and deciding Crystal Dynamics could successfully deliver the games on more platforms than Core Design could at the time. It was left in an unfinished but playable alpha state, with a build of this version leaked online in 2021.

=== Impact ===
Following the release of Tomb Raider, Lara Croft herself became a gaming icon, seeing unprecedented media cross promotion. These included commercials for cars and foodstuffs, an appearance on the cover of The Face, and requests for sponsorship from outside companies. The level of sophistication Tomb Raider reached by combining state-of-the-art graphics, an atmospheric soundtrack, and a cinematic approach to gameplay was at the time unprecedented.

While Gard enjoyed working at Core Design, he wished to have greater creative control, and disliked Eidos's treatment of Lara Croft in promotional material, which focused on her sex appeal at the expense of her in-game characterisation. Gard and Douglas left Core Design in 1997 to found their own studio, Confounding Factor. This prompted mixed feelings from remaining Core Design staff, who were already at work on the next title in the series. Speaking in 2004, Gard said he would have liked to produce a sequel, but noted that Lara had changed from his original concepts for her, leaving him unsure of how he would handle her. Gard would eventually return to the franchise with Tomb Raider: Legend.

In 2016, Derby resident Luke Earle organized a Tomb Raider Day celebration for the game's 20th anniversary on 24 October, showcasing memorabilia that included material taken from Core Design's offices following the company's closure in 2010. The event returned on the 25th anniversary in 2021, and has since become an annual occurrence.

==== Nude Raider ====
An infamous part of Tomb Raider's history is a fan-made software patch dubbed Nude Raider. The patch, when added to an existing PC copy of a Tomb Raider game, caused Lara to appear naked. In 1999, Core Design considered taking legal action against websites that hosted nude pictures of Lara Croft, stating that "we have a large number of young fans and we don't want them stumbling across the pictures when they do a general search for Tomb Raider." Eidos sent cease and desist letters to the owners of the "nuderaider.com" URL that hosted the patch to enforce its copyright of Tomb Raider. Sites depicting nude images of Lara Croft were sent cease and desist notices and shut down, and Eidos Interactive was awarded the rights to the Nude Raider domain name. Rumours suggested that Lara could be made nude through a cheat code. The management suggested this to developers, but the developers refused. As a response to the controversy, Core Design included a secret code in Tomb Raider 2; allegedly a similar nude code, it in fact makes Lara explode.
