= Jean-Yves Empereur =

French archaeologist

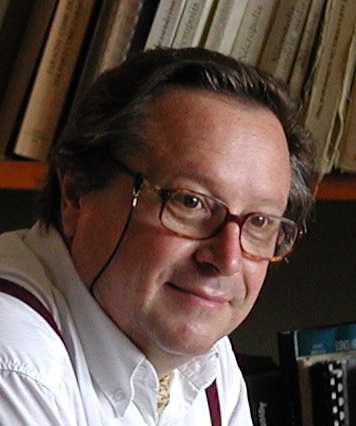
Jean-Yves Empereur

Jean-Yves Empereur (French: [ɑ̃pʁœʁ]; born 1952) is a French archeologist. He studied classic literature in the University Paris IV Sorbonne (DEA, CAPES, Agrégation de lettres in 1975, Doctorat in archeology in 1977).

He is a former member (since 1978) and general secretary (1982–2000) of the École française d'Athènes. He conducted some excavations, including some submarine ones, in Greece, Cyprus and Turkey, on the sites Thasos and Amathus.

He is a researcher from the CNRS, director of the Centre d'études alexandrines (CEA) - Alexandria Studies Center that he founded in 1990, and since then he has led archeological research in Alexandria on earth and underwater.

== Archeological excavations ==
Empereur conducts emergency excavations in the Alexandria town center. The modern city was built over the ancient one, which means that the archaeological excavations become possible only when older buildings are taken down for civil works, for example. As an example of this recovery work, beautiful mosaics can be enjoyed at Diane field, a Roman villa from the 2nd century.

In 1993, a dyke was to be built on the supposed site of the lighthouse of Alexandria. Empereur, Jean-Pierre Corteggiani, and around thirty scuba divers then attempted a rescue operation by starting some excavations in a 2.25 ha zone situated north-east from Fort Qaitbay.

Until 1996, these excavations in Alexandria harbour led to the discovery of many archeological remains: 5,000 architectural blocks weighing up to 75 tons, columns, capitals, huge broken statues, a dozen sphinxes, and above all the indisputable remains of the lighthouse itself. A 12-metre door made of Aswan granite was virtually reassembled. Some gigantic statues that used to stand against the lighthouse, representing Ptolemaic kings and queens, were found right next to their pedestal. Empereur hopes that in the future this marvellous site will be open to amateur scuba divers.

In March 1997, the site of the Gabbari Necropolis, Alexandria's city of the dead, was discovered during the building of the bridge linking the western harbour to the Cairo road. The director of the museums and archeological sites of Alexandria asked for Empereur's help on June 27. The general map of the ancient city appeared then, with the streets following the drawings by Dinocrates, the first urbanist architect.

== Bibliography ==
- Les amphores, la nécropole nord d’Amathonte II, Études chypriotes VIII, 1987
- Le port hellénistique d'Amathonte, Actes du Symposium "Cyprus and the Sea", Nicosie, 1993
- A short guide to the catacombs of Kom el Shoqafa, Alexandria, Sarapis, Alexandria, 1995, ISBN 977-5633-01-X
- Alexandrie redécouverte, Fayard, Paris, 1998, ISBN 2-7028-1161-2
- Alexandrina 1, Institut français d'archéologie orientale, Cairo, 1998
- Alexandrie médiévale 1, with Christian Décobert, Institut français d'archéologie orientale, Cairo, 1998
- Le Phare d'Alexandrie : La Merveille retrouvée, coll. « Découvertes Gallimard » (nº 352), série Archéologie. Paris: Gallimard, 1998 (new edition in 2004), ISBN 2-07-030379-9
- Petit guide du Musée gréco-romain d'Alexandrie, Harpocrates, Alexandria, 2000, ISBN 977-5845-02-5
- Alexandrie : Hier et demain, coll. « Découvertes Gallimard » (nº 412), série Culture et société. Paris: Gallimard, 2001, ISBN 2-07-076240-8
  - Alexandria: Past, Present and Future, 'New Horizons' series, London: Thames & Hudson, 2002
  - Alexandria: Jewel of Egypt, "Abrams Discoveries" series, New York: Harry N. Abrams, 2002
- Nécropolis 1, with Marie-Dominique Nenna, Institut français d'archéologie orientale, Cairo, 2001
- Alexandrina 2, Institut français d'archéologie orientale, Cairo, 2002
- Nécropolis 2, with Marie-Dominique Nenna, Institut français d'archéologie orientale, Cairo, 2003

== Filmography ==
Gédéon Programmes produced a documentary trilogy about Empereur's work, directed by Thierry Ragobert:

- La septième merveille du monde (le Phare)
- Alexandrie la magnifique
- Les mystères d'Alexandrie

== Personal life ==
In 2001 Empereur confronted video games publisher Eidos Interactive for using his image in the fourth game of Tomb Raider series: The game's protagonist, Lara Croft, meets a friend of hers in Alexandria, who coincidentally resembled Jean-Yves Empereur, including having the same first name and profession. The publisher apologized and agreed to stop using the character in their games.

== Honors and awards ==
- Knight of the Order of Legion of Honour
- Officer of the Ordre National du Mérite
- Officer of the Ordre des Palmes Académiques
- Knight of the Ordre des Arts et des Lettres

== See also ==
- Alexandria
- Lighthouse of Alexandria
