= Blam! Machinehead =

1996 video game

- European PlayStation cover art
- Developer: Core Design
- Publishers: WW: Eidos Interactive; JP: Virgin Interactive Entertainment
- Platforms: MS-DOS, PlayStation, Saturn
- Release: WW: 1996; BRA: February, 1997; JP: May 23, 1997
- Genre: First-person shooter
- Mode: Single-player

Blam! Machinehead (released in the US as Machine Head) is a 1996 first-person shooter (FPS) developed by Core Design and released by Eidos Interactive in North America and by Virgin Interactive Entertainment in Japan for Sega Saturn, MS-DOS, and PlayStation.

== Plot ==
In the near future of 2020, a disgruntled nanotechnology worker injects himself with nanomachines to improve his poor physique, accidentally turning himself into a sentient gray goo creature and destroying most life on Earth. MIT scientist Dr. Kimberly Stride rides a hovercraft over the goo wastelands to deliver a nuclear bomb into the heart of the creature.

== Reception ==
Reception

Review scores
Publication	Score
AllGame	2.5/5 (SAT)
GamePro	73/100
Joypad	70/100
Mega Fun	70/100
Next Generation	3/5 (SAT)

Next Generation reviewed the Saturn version of the game, rating it three stars out of five. The magazine praised the graphics capabilities, but was critical of controls and lack of additional content.

German magazine Mega Fun gave the game a rating of 86%. In 1998, Saturn Power listed the game 96th on their Top 100 Sega Saturn Games writing: "Nothing mind-blowingly original in any fashion but, in typical Core style, an interesting game nonetheless."
