= Lara Croft: Relic Run =

2015 video game

- Developer: Simutronics
- Publisher: Square Enix Europe
- Producers: Iain Riches; Laura Carter
- Series: Tomb Raider
- Engine: Unity
- Platforms: Android, iOS, Windows Phone 8
- Release: May 25, 2015
- Genres: Action-adventure, endless runner
- Mode: Single-player

Lara Croft: Relic Run is a free-to-play action-adventure endless runner platforming game for mobile platforms. It was developed by Simutronics and published by Square Enix's European subsidiary in May 2015. Players take on the role of franchise protagonist Lara Croft as she searches for a lost colleague while confronting a shadowy conspiracy.

Relic Run is part of the Lara Croft continuity, a subseries within the Tomb Raider franchise that is separate from the main series. It was developed as an evolution of the endless runner genre made famous by Temple Run. Simutronics and Crystal Dynamics worked closely together to make sure it was both its own game and fitted properly within the franchise.

== Gameplay ==
A scene from Lara Croft: Relic Run, with Lara performing a wall run

Lara Croft: Relic Run is an action-adventure endless runner platforming game in which the player controls Lara Croft, main protagonist of the Tomb Raider franchise. The gameplay is similar to Temple Run; Lara must navigate endlessly looping environments, accumulating a score depending on the distance run. The game uses touch controls, with different movements across the screen prompting an action from Lara. If Lara hits an obstacle, the run ends unless the player uses an Ankh, in which the case the run is continued from a checkpoint. Within these environments, Lara must navigate around natural obstacles and deliberate traps. The difficulty and frequency of obstacles and traps increases as the run continues. Lara can perform parkour moves within the environment, along with sliding, jumping and wall-running, each triggered contextually by a movement of the controls. During some occasional rail shooter combat segments, Lara must fight off enemies using equipped weapons: these include her trademark twin pistols, sub-machine guns and an assault rifle. Players tap on enemies to fire at them, along with crates containing coins or health. Lara must defend herself from enemy attacks by shooting projectiles out of the air; the run can also end if she falls in battle from losing all health. There are also some sequences where Lara travels in vehicles, such as a quad bike or motorbike, through areas of the level, and boss fights, where she fights large monsters, such as a Tyrannosaurus in the Jungle stage.

During runs, Lara collects coins which are used to purchase additional outfits that grant certain boosts to the player, new weapons, and upgrades to her boots for easier runs. In the game's 120-level campaign, spread out across three biomes and acts with 40 levels each, players alternate between completing objectives in the act's environment in odd-numbered levels and hunting for relics in even-numbered levels. In the former, the player must complete such level's objective three times in the same run to fully master the level with a 3-star rating, used to increase replay value. In the latter, Lara must find Clues, objects scattered along the route that fill up a meter in the top left corner of the screen. Once the meter is full, a Relic will appear, and Lara must collect this Relic to complete the level and earn extra coins. Lara can also collect score multipliers, which increase her run's overall score; caches of ammunition for her additional weapons; coin magnets, and Clue Boosters to find Relics faster. Each act has a set of achievements to unlock. Players with a Facebook account can post their scores on the site, and can also be sent Curses, which distort the game's visuals (such as creating a tunnel vision effect or pixellating the graphics) for a limited time. If a player survives the Curse, they are rewarded a cache of coins and the opportunity to send their own Curse to the other player. The game is free and all items can be unlocked in-game, but players can unlock various costumes and caches using in-app purchases.

== Premise ==
Set shortly after Lara Croft and the Temple of Osiris, the game follows Lara as she goes in search of fellow archeologist Carter Bell. On her search, which takes her through the jungles of Thailand, the Saharan Desert and the snowy Himalayas, she uncovers a world-threatening conspiracy. Relics collected during play sessions unlock journal entries that reveal pieces of the story and make new locations available.

== Development and release ==
Relic Run takes place in the Lara Croft subseries, a continuity separate from the mainline rebooted Tomb Raider games. When the project was first proposed, it was intended that Lara should retain key abilities from the main series, specifically her acrobatic abilities and the combat segments. While they used other endless runner games as a base, they did not want to copy them, instead trying to evolve them in a meaningful way. The bosses, such as the Tyrannosaurus, were included to give the game a fantastical feel, as opposed to the more mature and realistic entries in the main series. The ducking and diving sequences Lara went through entering these stages were incorporated to mask loading times. Striking the balance between the game's challenge and encouraging players to return was a crucial part of game development. Franchise developer Crystal Dynamics worked closely with developer Simutronics when designing the game, ensuring that it would remain faithful to the series despite its status as a mobile spin-off. The core fanbase was also consulted during development. The game's aesthetic was deliberately intended to evoke earlier Tomb Raider games: for instance, the opening Jungle stage evoked the opening levels of Tomb Raider III: Adventures of Lara Croft. It was also intended to appeal to a wider audience due to its platform and genre. Relic Run was first announced in April 2015, shortly thereafter going on a soft release in the Netherlands so any problems with the game could be sorted out prior to the full release. The game included advertisements incorporated in partnership with NativeX. It was released on May 25 for Android, iOS and Windows Phone 8.

== Reception ==
Reception

Aggregate score
Aggregator	Score
Metacritic	71/100

Review scores
Publication	Score
Gamezebo	3.5/5
Pocket Gamer	2.5/5
TouchArcade	4/5

The game had mixed reception by critics.

The Android version of the game has been installed more than 10 million times.
