= Tomb Raider Reloaded =

2023 video game

- Developer: Emerald City Games (Note: Support for and additional development of the game by DECA Games since late 2023.)
- Publisher: CDE Entertainment
- Engine: Unity
- Platforms: iOS, Android
- Release: 14 February 2023
- Genre: Action
- Modes: Single-player, multiplayer (Note: Added as of version 1.4. First multiplayer event commenced on September 29, 2023.)

Tomb Raider Reloaded is an action video game developed by Emerald City Games and published by CDE Entertainment for iOS and Android devices. Based on the Tomb Raider series, the game uses the classic character depiction of protagonist Lara Croft, departing from the "grittier" presentation of the "Survivor" reboot trilogy that began with Tomb Raider in 2013. The title was released between 2020 and 2022 in a few select countries as a free-to-play game, with optional in-app purchases, with a full release on 14 February 2023.

== Gameplay ==
Tomb Raider Reloaded is a top-down shooter that plays similar to the mobile game Archero, becoming one of the few Tomb Raider games played from a top-down perspective, such as Tomb Raider: The Prophecy and the two Lara Croft spin-offs Lara Croft and the Guardian of Light and Lara Croft and the Temple of Osiris.

== Premise ==
Tomb Raider Reloaded is the third Tomb Raider video game to be based on archaeologist Lara Croft's quest to uncover the lost kingdom of Atlantis by searching for three parts of an Atlantean artifact known as the Scion in three countries.

== Development ==
The game was announced in November 2020 for a 2021 release on iOS and Android, with Canadian studio Emerald City Games serving as the development studio, with it being published by Square Enix London Mobile. Franchise developer Crystal Dynamics was not directly involved with the game, but provided assistance to assure a "great Tomb Raider experience". The game soft-launched in South East Asia, Thailand and the Philippines on the Google Play Store in May 2021.

On July 21, an update was released that included improved graphics, more levels, new music, bug fixes and more. The game also added a new opening cutscene featuring the voice of Keeley Hawes, who last voiced Lara Croft in Lara Croft and the Temple of Osiris. On October 15, Square Enix London Mobile director Ed Perkins said that the game was delayed to 2022 and clarified that it was not meant to tie in directly to Square Enix's official 25th anniversary celebration of the Tomb Raider franchise in 2021. However, on the 25th anniversary of the release of Tomb Raider on the Sega Saturn in Europe on October 28, Shelley Blond, Judith Gibbins and Jonell Elliott were revealed to voice Lara Croft in Reloaded, giving players the option to choose between their voices as a launch exclusive feature.

The game was delayed until its release on February 14, 2023.

As of December 2023, DECA Games, a German subsidiary of Embracer Group, assumed development responsibilities for the game, replacing Emerald City Games. By the following summer, the game completed its transition to DECA Games and now has a new dedicated development team at work on updates.

== Release and updates ==
Reloaded was released as scheduled on February 14, 2023, with a Netflix version also available alongside it that grants Netflix subscribers a premium gameplay experience that is free of advertisements and in-app purchases. Players who pre-registered for the game ahead of its worldwide launch would begin the game with uncommon golden pistols.

The game's campaign was initially released incomplete, with only 9 chapters available to play across two acts, one in Peru and one in Greece, pursuant to the source material's plot. An update on June 12 added a final chapter for Greece, set in the tomb of Tihocan, to complete the second act, while also providing a sneak peek of three additional chapters set in Egypt for the story's third act.

Version 1.4, released on September 6, introduces a small aspect of multiplayer competition into the game in the form of event leaderboards and leagues, while also nerfing the gold pistols by changing their bonus ability that unlocks on epic rarity or higher.

Version 1.5, released on December 7, added the first chapter of the long-awaited Egypt chapters. In addition, new Doppelganger and Evening Dress outfits were added to the game.

On January 15, 2026, it was announced that the Netflix version of the game will be removed from Netflix, with the removal scheduled for February 13, 2026.
