= Tomb Raider (GBC video game) =

2000 video game

- European box art
- Developer: Core Design
- Publisher: THQ
- Producer: Troy Horton
- Designer: Darren Price
- Programmers: Sean Dunlevy; Ian Manders
- Artist: Matthew Charlesworth
- Composers: Manfred Linzner; Bernhard Wodok
- Series: Tomb Raider
- Platform: Game Boy Color
- Release: NA: 7 June 2000; EU: 28 June 2000; UK: 30 June 2000; AU: 18 July 2000
- Genre: Action-adventure
- Mode: Single-player

Tomb Raider (also known as Tomb Raider: The Nightmare Stone) is a 2000 action-adventure video game developed by Core Design and published by THQ for the Game Boy Color under license from series owner Eidos Interactive. Following series protagonist Lara Croft as she searches ruins in South America for a powerful artefact, the gameplay features platforming and puzzle-solving on a 2D side-scrolling environment.

Tomb Raider was the debut entry for the series on Nintendo platforms, with it being described by developers and journalists as technically impressive for the platform. It sold well for THQ, and was praised by critics for its technical achievements and emulation of the main series gameplay in portable form. Two sequels were released: Curse of the Sword in 2001 and The Prophecy in 2002.

== Gameplay ==
In Tomb Raider, the player controls Lara Croft though 14 levels spread across five areas. In each level, the player must solve puzzles, jump over obstacles, and defeat enemies. Lara can perform up to 25 different moves, including ledge-grabbing, backflips, and cliff-diving. The story of the game follows Lara's attempts to stop a group of treasure hunters from possessing the Nightmare Stone, a key capable of releasing the evil god Quaxet.

== Development and release ==
Tomb Raider was developed for the Game Boy Color (GBC) by series creators Core Design as the character's first title on Nintendo hardware. Following the release of Tomb Raider III (1998), artist Matthew Charlesworth and programmer Sean Dunlevy created a prototype build, originally intended as a science fiction project dubbed "Salvage". After two months of development, the two saw saw its potential as the working basis for a Tomb Raider game, getting approval for its development from Core Design lead Jeremy Heath-Smith. Production took a year, with staff including producer Troy Horten, veteran programmer Ian Manders, and multiple artists for the background art. Charlesworth described the production as full of "incredibly hard work and crazy hours (all self-inflicted)".

Eidos Interactive producer Mike Shmitt described the game as technically impressive for the platform given the character's origins on more powerful hardware. Lara's animations, numbering over two thousand, were rendered from the home console originals, with direct memory access used to make the animations work. Lara's model was 48 pixels, far more than other player characters on the console. The music and audio were handled by Manfred Linzner and Bernhard Wodok of Shin'en; the GBC Tomb Raider was among the company's first projects.

Eidos Interactive licensed the property out to THQ. In a press release, Eidos's Jeremy Heath-Smith explained the partnership as due to THQ's extensive library of GBC titles. Announced in November 1999, Tomb Raider was released in North America on 7 June 2000 under the title Tomb Raider Starring Lara Croft. It later released in Europe on 28 June, in the United Kingdom on 30 June, and in Australia on 18 July. To promote the release in the United Kingdom, THQ held a contest in GamesMaster magazine. Prizes were bundles that included copies of the game and Tomb Raider branded apparel, such as a shirt, backpack, and wallet. One bundle also included a Game Boy Color handheld console.

== Reception ==
Reception

Aggregate score
Aggregator	Score
GameRankings	79%

Review scores
Publication	Score
GamesMaster	90%
GameSpot	8.1/10
Hyper	8/10
IGN	8/10
N64 Magazine	4/5
Nintendo Power	7.6/10
Planet Game Boy	90%

During a report on the Australian release, THQ noted that the game had sold out in the region on release. THQ positively noted the game as part of its second quarter fiscal report for 2000.

The game received an average score of 79% at GameRankings, based on an aggregate of 10 reviews. Frank Provo of GameSpot praised the levels, stating that each features a different gameplay theme, ranging from rope climbing in the temple levels to swimming in the caverns and dash-jumping over volcanic lava flows. Critics also highlighted Lara's smooth and acrobatic animations, and the fact that the player can perform a wide variety of moves with the limited buttons of the Game Boy Color.
