= Tomb Raider II =

1997 video game

- Developer: Core Design (Note: Ported to Mac OS by Westlake Interactive.)
- Publisher: Eidos Interactive (Note: Mac OS release published by Aspyr.)
- Producer: Troy Horton
- Designers: Neal Boyd; Heather Gibson
- Programmer: Gavin Rummery
- Artists: Stuart Atkinson; Jocelyn Charmet
- Writer: Vicky Arnold
- Composer: Nathan McCree
- Series: Tomb Raider
- Platforms: Microsoft Windows; PlayStation; Mac OS iOS; Android
- Release: Windows, PlayStation: NA: 21 November 1997; EU: 21 November 1997; Mac OS: NA: October 1998; iOS; 3 December 2014; Android; 28 October 2015
- Genre: Action-adventure
- Mode: Single-player

Tomb Raider II (also known as Tomb Raider II: Starring Lara Croft) is a 1997 action-adventure video game developed by Core Design and published by Eidos Interactive. It was first released on Windows and PlayStation. Later releases came for Mac OS (1998), iOS (2014) and Android (2015). It is the second entry in the Tomb Raider series, and follows archaeologist-adventurer Lara Croft hunting the magical Dagger of Xian in competition with an Italian cult. Gameplay features Lara navigating levels split into multiple areas and room complexes while fighting enemies and solving puzzles to progress, with some areas allowing for or requiring the use of vehicles.

Production began in 1996 immediately after the success of the original Tomb Raider, being completed in between six and nine months, a short development period which was physically and emotionally stressful for the team. Original staff members Toby Gard and Paul Douglas left over creative differences with Eidos, though many remained including composer Nathan McCree. A Sega Saturn version was scrapped due to technical limitations and a console exclusivity deal signed between Eidos and Sony.

Tomb Raider II was well-received by critics upon its release, with many noting its expanded gameplay and smoother graphics. It went on to sell nearly seven million copies worldwide. An expansion pack entitled The Further Adventures of Lara Croft was in development in late 1997 but was cancelled. Some elements from the project were carried over to the 1998 sequel, Tomb Raider III. An expansion entitled The Golden Mask was released the following year, containing new levels focused on Lara's quest to find a golden mask in Alaska. A remastered version of the game, alongside The Golden Mask, was included in Tomb Raider I–III Remastered in 2024.

== Gameplay ==
Lara Croft rides a snowmobile to navigate through a level in the game.

Tomb Raider II is an action-adventure video game in which the player assumes the role of archaeologist-adventurer Lara Croft, exploring a series of locations including ruins and tombs in search of ancient artefacts. The game is split into levels: the Great Wall of China, Venice, an oil rig and shipwreck in an unspecified ocean area, and the foothills of Tibet. Lara's home of Croft Manor can be accessed from the start menu as a training area, and is used in the final level.

Much of the gameplay is carried over from the original Tomb Raider. The game is presented in a third person perspective focused on Lara, with levels and movement built around a grid-based system, with Lara's movement built around tank controls. Progress is based on puzzles revolving around finding keys and completing platforming sections, avoiding traps and environmental hazards in the process. Lara can run, walk (which prevents her from falling off ledges), look around areas, jump forwards and backwards, shimmy along ledges, crawl, swim through bodies of water, and move blocks. In addition, Lara is able to walk through shallow water, climb ladders and other designated surfaces, turn 180 degrees while jumping or swimming, and during the Venice and Tibet levels drive a speedboat and snowmobile respectively. Zip lines in some areas can be used to traverse large gaps, and flares can be used to light dark areas for a limited time.

By default in combat, Lara uses two pistols with infinite ammo, with her unable to perform actions aside from jumping while her weapons are drawn. Supplementary weapons with limited ammunition can be found during the game; these are a shotgun, dual automatic pistols, dual Uzis, an M16 rifle, a grenade launcher, and a harpoon gun used in underwater combat. In some urban areas, windows can be shot out to create new routes. During exploration, Lara can find supplies such as medipacks which heal damage, flares and ammunition for weapons both from defeated enemies, and around the environment. Each level contains three secret collectables−a silver, jade and gold dragon−which reward supply caches and sometimes weapons when all three are collected. Players can perform saves anywhere in-game. If Lara is killed, the player must restart from a previous save.

== Plot ==
Lara Croft is searching for the Dagger of Xian, a magical weapon once used by an ancient Emperor of China to command his army; by plunging the weapon into its owner's heart, the weapon has the power to transform its bearer into a dragon. Having tracked the Dagger's chamber to beneath the Great Wall of China, Lara is accosted by a member of the Fiamma Nera, an Italian cult obsessed with the Dagger. Before killing himself, the cultist reveals that his master Marco Bartoli seeks the Dagger, and she tracks the Fiamma Nera to an abandoned opera house in Venice, Italy. Stowing away aboard a seaplane leaving Venice with Bartoli on board, Lara overhears Bartoli discussing the Seraph, an object key to retrieving the key to the Dagger's chamber that was with his father Gianni when his luxury liner Maria Doria was bombed and sunk.

Lara is found on the plane and captured, being imprisoned in a repurposed oil rig above the Maria Doria. Lara escapes and encounters a monk of the Barkhang Monastery in Tibet, who originally defeated the Emperor and sealed the Dagger away. The monk was there to prevent Bartoli from salvaging the Seraph. Bartoli kills the monk, and Lara narrowly escapes and dives alongside a submersible to discover the shipwreck, and searching throughout the remains she eventually retrieves the Seraph. Using the plane, she heads for Tibet and reaches the Barkhang Monastery, which is under siege from the Fiamma Nera. Using the Seraph, she opens the way to retrieve the key to the Dagger's chamber, killing its monstrous guardian in the process. Escaping the Fiamma Nera, she unlocks the Dagger's chamber, but is plunged into the catacombs beneath before she can reach it.

Making her way back, she witnesses Bartoli stabbing himself with the Dagger and being carried through a portal by his cultists. Following them through, Lara navigates a magical space of floating jade islands and animated statues, finally confronting Bartoli as he transforms into a dragon. Lara renders the dragon unconscious and pulls the dagger from Bartoli's heart, killing him and escaping back into the real world just as the area starts to collapse, causing part of the Wall to explode in the process. The Fiamma Nera launch a final unsuccessful attack against Lara at Croft Manor; the final scene is Lara about to disrobe for a shower, then breaking the fourth wall as she shoots at the camera.

== Development ==
Upon its release in 1996, Tomb Raider was a huge critical and commercial success for developer Core Design and publisher Eidos Interactive. According to one report, a sequel was being planned two months before the original was released. Co-designer Heather Gibson called the prospect of not making a sequel "unthinkable" given the work done on the original and its commercial success. Due to creative differences surrounding Lara's portrayal and the decision to make a sequel rather than an entirely new game, her credited creator Toby Gard left the company alongside designer Paul Douglas, prompting mixed feelings from the other team members. Programmer Gavin Rummery had been working with Gard and Douglas on a planned original title, but disagreed with their attitude towards the heads of Core Design and rejoined the Tomb Raider team shortly before Gard and Douglas left.

The production schedule, which lasted between six and nine months according to different estimations, was taxing for many team member both physically and emotionally: the production was later described as a prolonged crunch period. Rummery described its production as "insane", while fellow programmer Andrew Howe felt the production time was not unreasonable due to using pre-existing technology. Alongside Rummery and Gibson, co-designer Neal Boyd, producer Troy Horton, writer Vicky Arnold, and composer Nathan McCree also remained. The team was also expanded so the game could be produced in time; among them was future designer Andy Sandham, transferred over from production of Fighting Force 2 to work on the CGI cutscenes. Also new to the team were animators Stewart Atkinson and Joss Charmet. A team of six playtesters worked on the game throughout production right until it was sent for Sony's approval, playing through the game repeatedly to pick up bugs.

Tomb Raider II was originally planned for PlayStation, Windows and Sega Saturn, the same platforms as the original. Core Design had been planning for a Saturn version of Tomb Raider II to use the 3D accelerator cartridge designed for the Saturn conversion of Virtua Fighter 3; this cartridge was cancelled before Tomb Raider II was completed. The Saturn version was officially cancelled in mid-1997, with Core Design staff member Adrian Smith citing technical limitations of the console to program an adequate conversion. It was reported that the more detailed 3D graphics of Tomb Raider II were too much for the Saturn hardware to handle, as the original game was already known to perform worse than other versions. In September 1997, Eidos signed a deal with Sony, making the console versions of Tomb Raider exclusive to the PlayStation until the year 2000. The Windows version was built for the Windows 95 system. The team described the two versions as having few differences beyond their graphics; the Windows version allowed for high resolution display, while the PlayStation version used "neat transparencies and other effects".

Lara's appearance in Tomb Raider II was given a make-over by Atkinson. The number of polygons used for her character model was increased, adding more realistic curves to its design, and giving her more outfits for different levels. Core Design producer Andrew Thompson estimated that her character model used double the number of polygons. She was also given a free-flowing ponytail to make her more realistic. The ponytail had been present in some early builds of the first game but had to be cut due to technical issues; a fix was developed that allowed it to appear in II. While Gard had been unwilling to populate the game with human enemies, Tomb Raider II put a greater focus on combat with armed human opponents, alongside a greater variety of animal and supernatural enemies. This was also done in response to player complaints about a lack of combat in the original.

While the higher combat meant there was more focus on action, Smith noted that the exploration that was a focus of the first game remained important. There were also more boss-like battles compared to the original, and the enemy AI was improved so they could pursue her onto raised platforms. Rather than starting over from scratch, the team used the same engine as the first game, focusing on tweaking and including new features such as climbing and wading. Adding in all the new elements, both graphical and gameplay-related, was described as challenging as the team wanted the game to be seen as its own game more than a sequel. Grenades were originally planned for the first game, but were not finished in time for release, so were not included in Tomb Raider II. A notable leftover glitch from the first game was the "corner bug", with Boyd intentionally placed a health item in the game that could only be reached by using the glitch.

A new level editor tool was designed so areas could be put together quickly, speeding up the level creation and allowing for quick detection of bugs. There was a greater variety of level environments created, including a number of outdoor areas. The in-game camera was also adjusted to correct awkward camera angles that could occur in the original. Tomb Raider II was described as similar in length to the first game, but with more detailed environments and expanded gameplay elements. Atkinson attributed the inclusion of vehicles as his suggestion. Three proposed actions that did not make it into the final game were crawling through narrow spaces, swinging on ropes, and a "hand-over-hand" gymnastics move with an unspecified application. Planned sections riding a motorbike and a horse had to be cut. The game was to have ended with the dragon battle, but this was felt to be anticlimactic, so an epilogue level was added. Due to time constraints, the team set the epilogue in the existing Croft Manor level. Winston the Butler was intended to appear in this final level armed with a blunderbuss, though he would not actually attack the enemies. His appearance was cut due to time constraints. The final shower scene, with Lara breaking the fourth wall, was a response from Core Design to the notorious "Nude Raider" fan patch. They similarly included a secret code that blew Lara up rather than its rumoured function of stripping Lara.

=== Audio ===
McCree was allotted much more time to score the game than he was with the original Tomb Raider, allowing him to not only write twice as many tunes, but also plan out ahead of time how his music would be used in the game and generally become more directly involved in the game's development. He worked on the game's music and sound with sound designer Matt Kemp. McCree enjoyed finding ways of arranging the main theme, with its simplicity making variations after the first game easy. One of the pieces he remembered fondly was "Venice"; describing it as "an exercise in stylistic writing", he wrote it to sound like a piece of Baroque music such as Antonio Vivaldi and Johann Sebastian Bach, with the major challenge being to make the violins sound real. He spent three months working on the score for Tomb Raider II. McCree and Kemp later called their work on the game stressful due to not knowing the space they had available, and needing to cut and rearrange the music and sound up to the last minute. The team considered incorporating interactive MIDI sampling, but discarded the idea due to poor sound quality.

While Lara's original voice actress Shelley Blond was offered the chance to reprise her role, she was unable to do so due to other commitments, but she gave permission for her effort noises to be kept. Judith Gibbins became the new voice of Lara. Gibbins, who had worked in amateur dramatics, was recommended to audition by her brother Martin Gibbins who worked at Core Design. Her role in the game was kept a secret, though she did confide in her son. The secrecy was part of the marketing strategy that Eidos was employing to make Lara seem like a real person. Voice recording took place in London and lasted months due to the need to re-record due to frequent script changes. She would voice the character only once more in the following game.

== Release ==
Tomb Raider II was announced early in 1997. An early demo based on the game's alpha version, later leaked online, was shown at E3. Beginning in October, Eidos launched what was described as a "multi-media dollar" extensive marketing campaign including radio commercials, print and television ads, cross promotion with MTV and the drink brand Pepsi, and a direct mail campaign. The push ran parallel to an increased media presence for Lara as a character. The exclusivity deal with Sony meant that extra funding was made available for the game's marketing, alongside making the Tomb Raider series an icon for the console. Due to the deadline pressure, PlayStation demo discs were mistakenly sent to Sony with expired copy-protection timers, making them unplayable. After Sony "went nuclear", Core Design quickly created a fix and recalled the discs. The Natural History Museum, London was booked out for a launch event hosted by Jonathan Ross. The launch party itself took place in Central Hall (now known as Hintze Hall), which at the time was dominated by the Diplodocus cast Dippy. For live action promotion at gaming events, Lara was portrayed by actress Rhona Mitra, who had replaced model Natalie Cook as part of Eidos's cross-media promotional strategy.

Both the Windows and PlayStation versions of the game were released in North America and Europe on 21 November 1997. The PlayStation version was published in Japan by Victor Interactive Software on 22 January 1998. A version for Mac OS was developed by Westlake Interactive and published by Aspyr in North America in October 1998.

Tomb Raider II went platinum on PlayStation 1 in Europe on March 19th 1999 and was granted Millennium Product status by the Design Council under the government of Tony Blair.

Tomb Raider II was made available for download for the PlayStation 3 via the PlayStation Network store on 7 September 2012. The game was released for Mac OS X and sold via the Mac App Store in October 2011. The PC version was re-released digitally in 2012 by GOG.com. A version for iOS was published by then-franchise owner Square Enix on 3 December 2014. This version was released for Android the following year on 28 October. The game was remastered as part of the Tomb Raider I–III Remastered collection for the Nintendo Switch, PlayStation 5, PlayStation 4, Xbox Series X/S, Xbox One, and PC in February 2024.

=== The Further Adventures of Lara Croft expansion ===
A cancelled expansion pack for the game was in development in late 1997, which would have featured seven levels set in India. The pack was nicknamed Tomb Raider 2.5 by some media at the time, and Gavin Rummery described it as a "continuation" of Tomb Raider II. A disk swapping feature was in development for the PlayStation version of Tomb Raider II that would allow players to launch the original, then switch out disks to play the expansion pack levels. According to IGN it would have also featured new FMV sequences.

A new team composed of other Core Design developers was established for the expansion, while the Tomb Raider II team explored an early transition to the PlayStation 2 for the franchise with a two or three year development period. In the end Eidos' desire for annual sequels led to a cancellation of the PlayStation 2 project; the expansion team instead developed a full sequel for PlayStation as Tomb Raider III: Adventures of Lara Croft. Some elements from The Further Adventures were carried over into the final game.

=== The Golden Mask expansion ===
An additional set of four levels, alternately called Tomb Raider II Gold and Tomb Raider II: The Golden Mask, was released for Windows and Mac OS in 1999. The story follows Lara exploring a hidden realm in Alaska in search of a magical golden mask. The levels were first released as downloadable content through the game's website starting in April 1999. The full version was released as an expansion pack alongside a reissue of the main game on 30 May. The levels were offered as a free download for those who already owned Tomb Raider II. While the levels were original, they were built using the existing engine and technology of Tomb Raider II. Phil Campbell, designer of the Gold editions of the Tomb Raider games, noted that the levels and stories were designed based around references more than having any connection to the main game. The level set was originally going to have an opening cutscene introducing the narrative. Lara was originally given a more revealing leopard skin jumpsuit outfit for the level "Nightmare in Vegas", but was vetoed by Eidos and Core Design as not fitting the character. Another dropped concept for the level was having the scenery mostly in black and white, and human enemies being different versions of Elvis Presley. While released for the Mac in January 2000, and included in the mobile ports and Remastered, several re-releases of Tomb Raider II excluded The Golden Mask due to licensing issues.

== Reception ==
Reception

Aggregate scores
Aggregator	Score		
Aggregator	iOS	PC	PS
GameRankings	N/A	80%	83%
Metacritic	53/100	N/A	85/100

Review scores
Publication	Score		
Publication	iOS	PC	PS
Electronic Gaming Monthly	N/A	N/A	9/10
GameSpot	N/A	8.2/10	5.7/10
IGN	N/A	N/A	8/10
Next Generation	N/A	N/A	4/5
Official U.S. PlayStation Magazine	N/A	N/A	4.5/5
PlayStation: The Official Magazine	N/A	N/A	10/10
TouchArcade	3/5	N/A	N/A
Macworld	N/A	4/5	N/A

Tomb Raider II received positive reviews from most critics. At Metacritic, which assigns a weighted average rating out of 100, the game received a score of 85 for the PlayStation version based on 13 reviews, which indicates "favourable reviews". The majority commented that while the differences from the original game are relatively small, Tomb Raider was a strong enough game that these differences and the consistent execution were enough to make an outstanding game. Next Generation, for example, stated that despite its forced development and having little additions in the game, the magazine felt the second game was superior to the original. Glenn Rubenstein was one of the few to disagree, writing in GameSpot that the improvements were cosmetic. He opined that both instalments of the series to date are uninspired games which sold largely on the stardom of Lara Croft. IGN's Adam Douglas concluded that compared to its predecessor, the second game is inferior to the original despite being entertaining. Crispin Boyer of Electronic Gaming Monthly drew the comparison more favourably, considering Tomb Raider II a superior game.

Among the changes the sequel made, the ones which received the most positive mentions were the addition of vehicles and the ability to climb walls. Many critics also compared the game's massive length favourably to that of the original Tomb Raider. Both GameSpot's Tim Soete and GamePro highly praised the timed traps, saying they induce a greater sense of panic and engagement than the traps in the original Tomb Raider. Rubenstein, despite his generally negative assessment of the game, agreed with Douglas that the greater number of human opponents in the sequel was a welcome improvement. An overwhelming majority of critics described Tomb Raider II as extremely difficult right from the beginning levels, with Next Generation stating that Core had clearly designed it with players who had completed the original Tomb Raider in mind. GamePro likewise described it as "for experts", but suggested that novices could learn the game given a good amount of patience and practice.

The graphics received more criticism than other aspects of the game; both Rubenstein and Electronic Gaming Monthly's Shawn Smith noted that the environmental graphics are rough, but added that this was both understandable and relatively unimportant given the enormous size of the levels. Soete and Next Generation also praised the huge levels, with Soete commenting that Lara is exaggeratedly dwarfed in her surroundings, scaling the enormous walls of a gangster hideout's vestibule during one adventure, swinging from balcony to balcony in a surrealistically proportioned opera house during another. Macworld's Michael Gowan wrote that while gunplay is involved, the exploration and problem solving keep the players riveted for hours and also praised the graphics. GamePro gave Tomb Raider II a 4.0 out of 5 for control and a perfect 5.0 for sound, fun factor, and graphics, applauding the controls, onslaught of threats, character animation, cinematic cutscenes, and intelligent use of sound effects and music.

Electronic Gaming Monthly named it "Adventure Game of the Year" at their 1997 Editors' Choice Awards, citing its unmatched variety of challenges and experiences.

=== Sales ===
In their first month of release in the United States, the computer and PlayStation versions of Tomb Raider II were respectively the ninth best-selling computer game and the eleventh best-selling home console game. The PlayStation version peaked at #3 in December 1997, while the computer version peaked at #6 in January 1998. The PlayStation version briefly resurfaced on the chart in March and April 1999. In the UK, the game remained in the top 10 sales charts for 29 weeks and stayed in the top 40 sales charts for 167 consecutive weeks. In August 1998, Tomb Raider II's computer and PlayStation releases each received a "Platinum" sales award from the Verband der Unterhaltungssoftware Deutschland (VUD), given to games with at least 200,000 sales across Germany, Austria and Switzerland. Sales of its computer version totaled 137,000 units in the German market between January and September 1998 alone, which made it the region's third-best-selling computer game during that period. It ultimately became the German market's fifth-best-selling computer game of 1998 as a whole. Tomb Raider II's PlayStation version sold 221,000 units and was the German market's third-biggest console title across all systems over the same timeframe. At the 1999 Milia festival in Cannes, Tomb Raider II earned a "Gold" prize for revenues above €39 million in the European Union during the previous year. In 2005, Tomb Raider II was ranked as the second best-selling PS1 and tenth best-selling PC game of all time in the UK. The game has sold 6.8 million copies worldwide as of 2009, and was the second overall best selling PlayStation title in the UK.

== Legacy ==
Following Tomb Raider and Tomb Raider II, the Core Design team wanted two years to properly evolve the series game design, but the company was committed by Eidos to delivering a new Tomb Raider title annually to meet consumer demand, which caused several team members to attempt quitting. To compromise, Heath-Smith hired further staff, with many of these new hires working on the next entry. Originally intended as a spin-off and reworked during development as the next mainline entry, Tomb Raider III was released in 1998 for PlayStation and Windows. Alongside this, other team members began work on the fourth entry Tomb Raider: The Last Revelation (1999), intended as a means of killing off the character due to the workload and stress of developing the series.

Tomb Raider II and The Golden Mask expansion were released as part of Tomb Raider I–III Remastered, a high-definition remaster for Nintendo Switch, PlayStation 4, PlayStation 5, Windows, Xbox One, and Xbox Series X/S. Released in February 2024, it was developed and published by Aspyr in partnership with Crystal Dynamics. The remaster includes options for new control schemes, and revamped graphics.

During this period, Lara Croft also reached the height of her popularity as a character, appearing in advertisements and media crossovers, including an appearance in U2's 1997 PopMart Tour. A film adaptation was first proposed in 1996 and the film rights were acquired by Paramount Pictures in 1998. The adaptation was eventually released as Lara Croft: Tomb Raider in 2001 with Angelina Jolie in the titular role. In 2017, the game's opening Great Wall level was remade by a fan in Unreal Engine and released as Tomb Raider: The Dagger of Xian. The project was a free demo.

=== Winston in the freezer ===
As Winston the butler follows Lara around the Croft Manor level, it is possible to lead him into the walk-in freezer and close the door to trap him in there. Doing so became a popular joke among players. Heather Gibson was aware it was possible during development of the level, but it was not a conscious design choice. Winston was coded as "violent" but was slow moving and lacked any attacks, which led him to follow Lara slowly around the level. He would attempt to leave the freezer but was unable to do so. Asked about the scene in an interview conducted for The Making of Tomb Raider, McCree stated that for fans "...it's oddly part of their childhood, hearing Winston, and locking him in the freezer."

The scene is referenced in Rise of the Tomb Raider, where a document indicates that a younger Lara used to lock Winston in there as an "act of rebellion". In the remastered version of the game, locking Winston in the freezer causes him to be frozen into a block of ice and the player is granted an achievement.
