= Temple of Osiris =

Temple of Osiris may refer to:

- Great Osiris Temple, in Abydos, Egypt
- Lara Croft and the Temple of Osiris, a video game
