= Tomb Raider =

Video game franchise

- The Tomb Raider logo from 2022 onwards
- Genre: Action-adventure
- Developers: Core Design (1996–2006); Aspyr (1998–2003, 2022–2025); Crystal Dynamics (2003–2017, 2021–present); Eidos-Montréal (2015–2019); Square Enix Montréal (2015–2016); Flying Wild Hog (2022–present)
- Publishers: Eidos Interactive (1996–2009); Square Enix (2010–2021); Microsoft Studios (2015–2016); Aspyr (2024–2025); Amazon Games (since 2026)
- Platforms: Various: Android; Arcade; Dreamcast; Evercade; Game Boy Color; Game Boy Advance; GameCube; iOS; Linux; macOS; Microsoft Windows; Mobile phone; J2ME; MS-DOS; N-Gage; N-Gage 2.0; Nintendo DS; Nintendo Switch; Nintendo Switch 2; PlayStation; PlayStation 2; PlayStation 3; PlayStation 4; PlayStation 5; PlayStation Portable; Sega Saturn; Stadia; Wii; Windows Mobile; Xbox; Xbox 360; Xbox One; Xbox Series S; Xbox Series X
- First release: Tomb Raider; 24 October 1996
- Latest release: Tomb Raider IV–VI Remastered; 14 February 2025

Tomb Raider, also known under Lara Croft: Tomb Raider from 1996 to 2008, is a media franchise that originated with an action-adventure video game series created by British developer Core Design. The franchise is currently owned by Embracer Group and operated by CDE Entertainment; it was formerly owned by Eidos Interactive, then by Square Enix Europe after Square Enix's acquisition of Eidos in 2009 until Embracer Group purchased the intellectual property alongside Eidos in 2022. The franchise focuses on the fictional British archaeologist Lara Croft, who traverses the globe in search of lost artefacts, infiltrating dangerous tombs, ruins and militia along her journey. Gameplay generally focuses on exploration, solving puzzles, navigating hostile environments filled with traps, and fighting enemies. Additional media has been developed for the franchise in the form of film adaptations, comics, soundtracks and novels.

Development of the first Tomb Raider video game began in 1994; it was released two years later. Its critical and commercial success prompted Core Design to develop a new game annually for the next four years, which put a strain on staff. The sixth game, Tomb Raider: The Angel of Darkness, faced difficulties during development and was considered a failure at release. This prompted Eidos to switch development duties to Crystal Dynamics, which has been the series' primary developer since. Other developers have contributed to spin-off titles and ports of mainline entries.

The Tomb Raider series had sold over 100 million units worldwide by 2024, while the entire franchise generated close to $1.2 billion in revenue by 2002. The series has received generally positive reviews from critics, and Lara Croft became one of the most recognisable video game characters, winning accolades and earning places on the Walk of Game and Guinness World Records.

== Titles ==
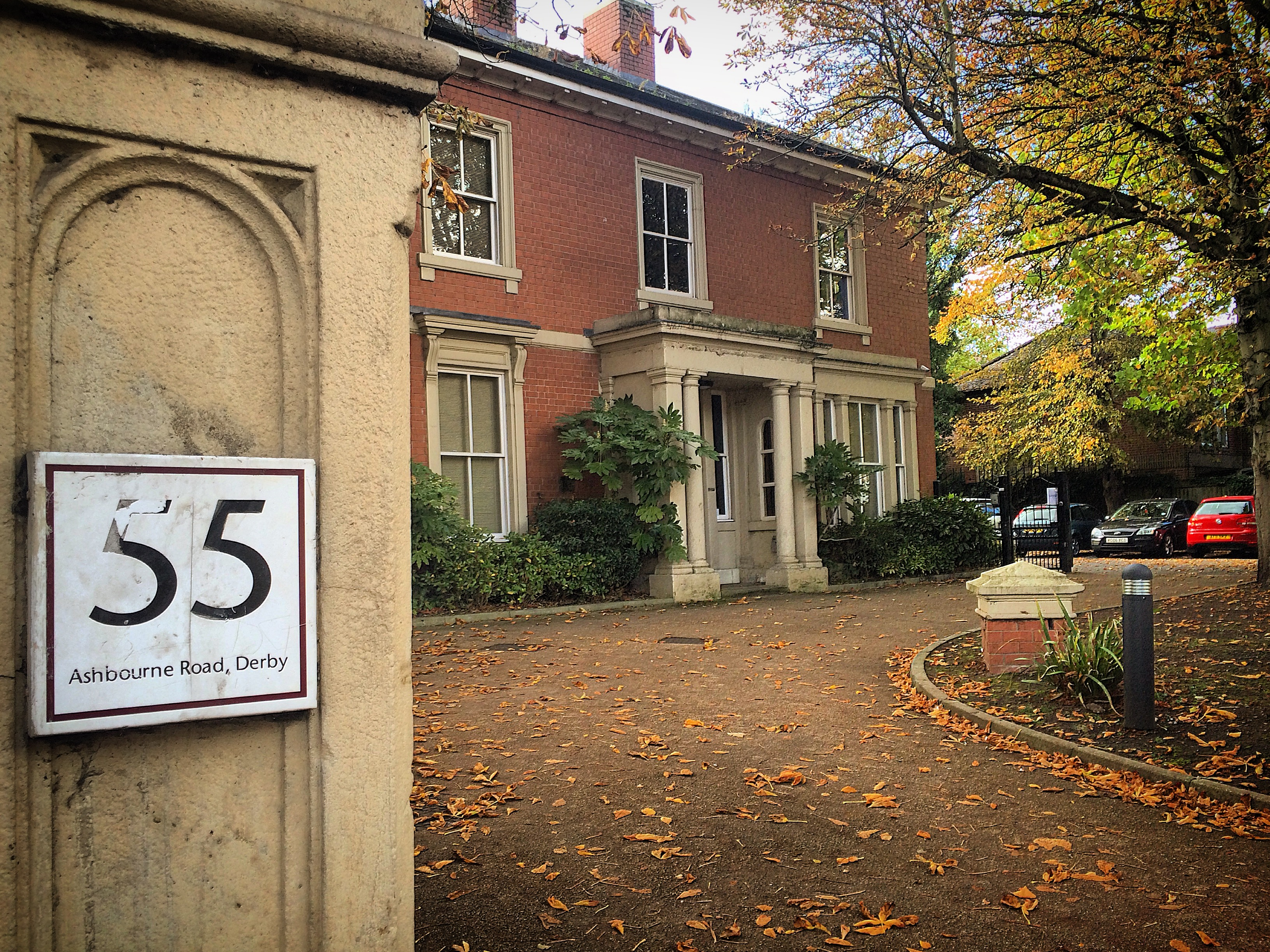
55 Ashbourne Road in Derby, where Core Design developed Tomb Raider from 1994 to 2006

Release timeline Core Design Crystal Dynamics Square Enix Embracer
1996	Tomb Raider
1997	Tomb Raider II
1998	Tomb Raider III
1999	Tomb Raider: The Last Revelation
2000	Tomb Raider
2000	Tomb Raider: Chronicles
2001	Tomb Raider: Curse of the Sword
2002	Tomb Raider: The Prophecy
2003	Tomb Raider: The Angel of Darkness
2004–2005
2006	Tomb Raider: Legend
2007	Tomb Raider: Anniversary
2008	Tomb Raider: Underworld
2009
2010	Lara Croft and the Guardian of Light
2011–2012
2013	Tomb Raider
2014	Lara Croft and the Temple of Osiris
2015	Lara Croft: Relic Run
2015	Lara Croft Go
2015	Rise of the Tomb Raider
2016–2017
2018	Shadow of the Tomb Raider
2019–2022
2023	Tomb Raider Reloaded
2023	The Lara Croft Collection
2024	Tomb Raider I–III Remastered
2025	Tomb Raider IV–VI Remastered
2026
2027	Tomb Raider: Legacy of Atlantis
2028	Tomb Raider: Catalyst

The first six Tomb Raider games were developed by Core Design, a British video game development company owned by Eidos Interactive. After the sixth game in the series was released to a mixed reception in 2003, development was transferred to American studio Crystal Dynamics, who have handled the main series since. Since 2001, other developers have contributed either to ports of mainline games or with the development of spin-off titles.

=== Main series ===
==== Original series ====
Tomb Raider, the first entry in the series, was released in 1996 initially for the Sega Saturn and then the PlayStation and personal computers (PC). The Saturn and PlayStation versions were then released for Japan in 1997. Its sequel, Tomb Raider II, launched in 1997, again for Microsoft Windows and PlayStation. A month before release, Eidos finalised a deal with Sony Computer Entertainment to keep the console version of Tomb Raider II and future games exclusive to PlayStation until the year 2000. The PlayStation version was released in Japan in 1998. Tomb Raider III launched in 1998. As with Tomb Raider II, the PlayStation version released in Japan the following year.

The fourth consecutive title in the series, Tomb Raider: The Last Revelation, released in 1999. In 2000, with the end of the PlayStation exclusivity deal, the game also released on the Dreamcast. In Japan, both console versions released the following year. Tomb Raider: Chronicles released in 2000 on the same platforms as The Last Revelation, with the PlayStation version's Japanese release as before coming the following year. After a three-year gap, Tomb Raider: The Angel of Darkness was released on Microsoft Windows and PlayStation 2 (PS2) in 2003. The PlayStation 2 version was released in Japan that same year.

==== Legend trilogy ====
The next entry and first reboot of the franchise, Tomb Raider: Legend, was released worldwide in 2006 for Microsoft Windows, PlayStation 2, Xbox, Xbox 360, PlayStation Portable (PSP), GameCube, Game Boy Advance (GBA) and Nintendo DS. The Xbox 360, PlayStation 2 and PlayStation Portable versions were released in Japan the same year. A year later, a remake of the first game (with the updated game engine of Tomb Raider: Legend) titled Tomb Raider: Anniversary was released worldwide in 2007 for Microsoft Windows, PlayStation 2, PlayStation Portable, Xbox 360 and the Wii. The next entry, Tomb Raider: Underworld, was released in 2008 on Microsoft Windows, PlayStation 3 (PS3), PlayStation 2, Xbox 360, Wii and DS. The PlayStation 3, PlayStation 2, Xbox 360 and Wii versions were released in Japan in 2009.

In 2011, The Tomb Raider Trilogy was released for PlayStation 3 as a compilation release that included Anniversary and Legend remastered in HD resolution, along with the PlayStation 3 version of Underworld. The disc includes avatars for PlayStation Home, a Theme Pack, new Trophies, Developer's Diary videos for the three games, and trailers for Lara Croft and the Guardian of Light as bonus content.

==== Survivor trilogy ====
The second reboot of the series, titled Tomb Raider, was released worldwide in 2013 for Microsoft Windows, PlayStation 3 and Xbox 360. Its sequel, Rise of the Tomb Raider, was released in 2015 on the Xbox 360 and Xbox One. The game was part of a timed exclusivity deal with Microsoft. Versions for the PlayStation 4 and Microsoft Windows were released in 2016. A following sequel to complete the trilogy, Shadow of the Tomb Raider, was released worldwide on PlayStation 4, Xbox One, and Microsoft Windows in 2018. An arcade game based on this incarnation was released by Bandai Namco Amusement in Europe in 2018.

=== Spin-offs ===
==== Game Boy spin-offs ====
Core Design developed two Game Boy Color titles in the early 2000s. The first, a side-scrolling game simply titled Tomb Raider was released in 2000. The second, its sequel, Tomb Raider: Curse of the Sword, was released in 2001. A Game Boy Advance title called Tomb Raider: The Prophecy was released in 2002. Unlike the first two Game Boy titles, this was developed by Ubi Soft Milan and published by Ubi Soft, adopting an isometric perspective and moving away from the side-scrolling platform-based gameplay.

==== Lara Croft spin-offs ====
From 2010 to 2015, a subseries simply titled Lara Croft was in development at Crystal Dynamics, introducing an isometric video game graphics gameplay style was released, existing in its own continuity. The first game, Lara Croft and the Guardian of Light, was released in 2010 as a downloadable title for PC, PS3 and Xbox 360. It was followed by Lara Croft and the Temple of Osiris, released for retail and download in 2014 for PC, PS4 and Xbox One. Both titles were released in a compilation entitled The Lara Croft Collection for Nintendo Switch in 2023. An entry for mobile devices, an endless runner platformer titled Lara Croft: Relic Run, was released in 2015. Square Enix Montreal also released a platform-puzzler for mobile devices, Lara Croft Go in 2015.

==== Other spin-offs ====
In 2023, four Tomb Raider titles for mobile phones were released. Developed by Emerald City Games for iOS and Android devices, Tomb Raider Reloaded is an action arcade and free-to-play game released by CDE Entertainment in 2022. A Tomb Raider themed downloadable content expansion for PowerWash Simulator was released for free on 31 January 2023.

=== Cancelled games ===
The plans for the franchise following the release of Tomb Raider II in 1997 were heavily revised. Initially, an expansion disk was planned for II entitled The Further Adventures of Lara Croft, which would have been set in India. Some engineering work was conducted for the PlayStation version to allow for a disk swap after launching the base game. A segment from issue 64 of GamesMaster informally referred to the expansion as Tomb Raider 2.5 and stated that it would have seven levels. A full sequel, then billed as Tomb Raider III was planned to have a two-year development period and release on the PlayStation 2. This game would have had a remote island setting and a focus on survival, including a need to find food and water. Core Design developer Gavin Rummery has stated that the island setting would not have resembled the 2013 reboot, but rather have been "self-contained". Eidos was initially behind the plan but intended to maintain an annual release schedule, and therefore brought in a new team to handle The Further Adventures of Lara Croft. Rummery objected on the grounds that splitting Tomb Raider out across multiple teams could lead to conflict between the projects, and has stated that it led him to "eventually throw in the towel." Eidos pursued annual releases with the new team. The India setting from the expansion disk was adopted for Tomb Raider III, a sequel for the original PlayStation, and the PlayStation 2 title was dropped. Rummery credits the failure of The Angel of Darkness in 2003 to burnout of the second team from annual releases, which stemmed from those directional changes in the late 1990s. The details were ultimately revealed by interviews with former staffers conducted for The Making of Tomb Raider in 2021.

After the release of The Angel of Darkness in 2003, Core Design continued working on the franchise for another three years, but both of the projects under development in that period were cancelled. A sequel titled The Lost Dominion was undergoing preliminary development that year, but the negative reception of The Angel of Darkness caused it and a wider trilogy to be scrapped. With Eidos's approval, Core Design then began development of an updated edition of the first game for the PSP called Tomb Raider: 10th Anniversary in late 2005, with a projected release date of Christmas 2006. Development continued while other Core Design staff were working on the platformer Free Running. When Core Design was sold to Rebellion Developments in June 2006, Eidos requested the project's cancellation. It was suggested by staff that Eidos did not want to let outside developers handle the franchise. An Indiana Jones "reskin" of the game was never completed, and Free Running was ultimately the studio's final title in 2007. Core Design—by then named Rebellion Derby—shut down in 2010. A January 2006 build of 10th Anniversary was leaked online in 2020, and remains available on the Internet Archive.

In the mid-2000's TT Games produced a test animation of Lara Croft as a Lego minifigure. The studio felt the Tomb Raider series wasn’t big enough for a standalone game, so the idea was pitched to Lucasfilm as a potential crossover with Indiana Jones. The pitch was immediately rejected, as Lucasfilm disliked the Tomb Raider series and believed it to be a knockoff of Indiana Jones.

== Common elements ==
=== Lara Croft ===
Various incarnations of Lara Croft in the video game series. Despite multiple revisions to her clothing and general physique, her face and hair have remained generally consistent.

Lara Croft is the main protagonist and playable character of the video game series. She travels around the world in search of many forgotten artefacts and locations, frequently connected to supernatural powers. While her biography has changed throughout the series, her shared traits are her origins as the only daughter and heir of the aristocratic Croft family. She is portrayed as intelligent, athletic, elegant, fluent in multiple languages, and determined to fulfil her own goals at any cost. She has brown eyes and brown hair worn in a braid or ponytail. The character's classic outfit consists of a turquoise singlet, light brown shorts, calf-high boots, and tall white socks. Recurring accessories include fingerless gloves, a backpack, a utility belt with holsters on either side, and twin pistols. Later games have multiple new outfits for her.

Lara Croft has been voiced by six actresses in the video game series: Shelley Blond, Judith Gibbins, Jonell Elliott, Keeley Hawes, Camilla Luddington, and Alix Wilton Regan. In other media, Croft was also voiced by Minnie Driver and Hayley Atwell in various animated series, and portrayed by Angelina Jolie and Alicia Vikander in feature films. Multiple models and body doubles have portrayed Croft in promotional material until the reboot in 2013. Eight different real-life models have portrayed her at promotional events.

In January 2023, The Hollywood Reporter reported that Phoebe Waller-Bridge was set to write a TV show adaptation of the franchise for Amazon, starring Sophie Turner as Croft. The series on Prime Video was announced to be accompanied by a tie-in video game and film in an interconnected universe, likened to the Marvel Cinematic Universe.

==== Continuity ====
The circumstances of her first adventures, along with the drive behind her adventures, differ depending on the continuity. In the original continuities, she is on a plane that crashes in the Himalayas: her journey back to civilization against the odds help to begin her journey towards her adult life as an adventuress and treasure hunter. In the original continuity, after her ordeal in the Himalayas, she left behind her privileged life and made a living writing about her exploits as an adventurer, mercenary, and cat burglar. Shortly after these books she was disowned by her family. In The Last Revelation, Lara was caught in a collapsing pyramid at the game's end, leaving her fate unknown: this was because the staff, exhausted from four years of non-stop development, wanted to move on from the character. Chronicles was told through a series of flashbacks at a wake for Lara, while The Angel of Darkness was set an unspecified time after The Last Revelation, with Lara revealed to have survived. The circumstances of her survival were originally part of the game but were cut due to time constraints and the pushing of the publisher Eidos.

In the Legend continuity, her mother Amelia was involved in the crash, and she is partially driven by the need to discover the truth behind her mother's disappearance and vindicate her father's theories about Amelia's disappearance. This obsession with the truth is present in Anniversary, and ends up bringing the world to the brink of destruction during the events of Underworld. Her father is referred to as Lord Henshingly Croft in the original games and Lord Richard Croft in the Legend continuity. The Lara Croft subseries take place within their own separate continuity, devoting itself to adventures similar to earlier games while the main series goes in a different stylistic direction.

In the 2013 reboot continuity, Lara's mother vanished at an early age, and her father became obsessed with finding the secrets of immortality, eventually resulting in an apparent suicide. Lara distanced herself from her father's memory, believing like many others that his obsession had caused him to go mad. After studying at university, Lara gets an opportunity to work on an archaeology program, in the search for the mythic kingdom of Yamatai. The voyage to find the kingdom results in a shipwreck on an island, which is later discovered to be Yamatai, but the island is also home to savage bandits, who were victims of previous wrecks. Lara's attempts to find a way off the island lead her to discover that the island itself is stopping them from leaving, which she discovered is linked to the still-living soul of the Sun Queen Himiko. Lara tries to find a way to banish the spirit of the sun queen in order to get home. The aftermath of the events of the game causes Lara to see that her father was right, and that she had needlessly distanced herself from him. She decides to finish his work, and uncover the mysteries of the world. The game's sequels portray Lara Croft in conflict with an ancient organization, Trinity, in their quest to obtain supernatural items for world domination.

=== Gameplay ===
A gameplay screenshot from Tomb Raider: Anniversary, showing Lara jumping for a ledge below a door switch. While many mechanics within the Tomb Raider series have undergone changes, platforming and puzzle solving linked to this are recurring, standard elements within the series.

The gameplay of Tomb Raider is primarily based around an action-adventure framework, with Lara navigating environments and solving mechanical and environmental puzzles, in addition to fighting enemies and avoiding traps. These puzzles, primarily set within ancient tombs and temples, can extend across multiple rooms and areas within a level. Lara can swim through water, a rarity in games at the time that has continued through the series. According to original software engineer and later studio manager Gavin Rummery, the original set-up of interlinking rooms was inspired by Egyptian multi-roomed tombs, particularly the tomb of Tutankhamun. The feel of the gameplay was intended to evoke that of the 1989 video game Prince of Persia. In the original games, Lara utilised a "bulldozer" steering set-up, with two buttons pushing her forward and back and two buttons steering her left and right, and in combat Lara automatically locked onto enemies when they came within range. The camera automatically adjusts depending on Lara's action, but defaults to a third-person perspective in most instances. This basic formula remained unchanged through the first series of games. Angel of Darkness added stealth elements.

For Legend, the control scheme and character movement was redesigned to provide a smooth and fluid experience. One of the key elements present was how buttons for different actions cleanly transitioned into different actions, along with these moves being incorporated into combat to create effects such as stunning or knocking down enemies. Quick-time events were added into certain segments within each level, and many of the puzzles were based around sophisticated in-game physics. Anniversary, while going through the same locales of the original game, was rebuilt using the gameplay and environmental puzzles of Legend. For Underworld, the gameplay was redesigned around a phrase the staff had put to themselves: "What Could Lara Do?". Using this set-up, they created a greater variety of moves and greater interaction with the environment, along with expanding and improving combat.

The gameplay underwent another major change for the 2013 reboot. Gameplay altered from progression through linear levels to navigating an open world, with hunting for supplies and upgrading equipment and weapons becoming a key part of gameplay, yet tombs were mostly optional, and platforming was less present in comparison to combat. The combat was redesigned to be similar to the Uncharted series: the previous reticle-based lock-on mechanics were replaced by a free-roaming aim. Rise of the Tomb Raider built on the 2013 reboot's foundation, adding dynamic weather systems, reintroducing swimming, and increasing the prevalence of non-optional tombs with more platforming elements.

== History ==
=== Original series at Core Design (1994–2006) ===
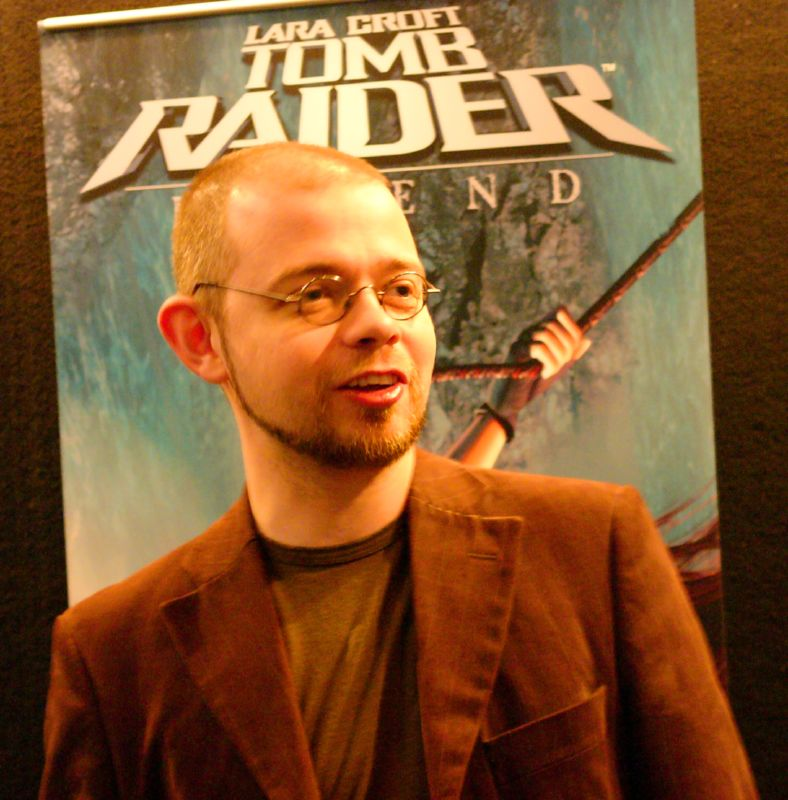
Toby Gard, a key creative figure for the original series, at E3 2005

The concept for Tomb Raider originated in 1994 at Core Design, a British game development studio. One of the people involved in its creation was Toby Gard, who was mostly responsible for creating the character of Lara Croft. Gard originally envisioned the character as a man: company co-founder Jeremy Heath-Smith was worried the character would be seen as derivative of Indiana Jones, so Gard changed the character's gender. Her design underwent multiple revisions and redrafts during early development. The game proved an unexpected commercial success, reversing Eidos' then-bleak financial situation. After the success of Tomb Raider, work began on a sequel. Gard was no longer given creative control of the character, and it was stated by development staff that he was both saddened and disappointed by the use of Lara Croft's sex appeal in marketing. Gard left Core Design in 1997, alongside Tomb Raider co-creator Paul Douglas, to found their own gaming company Confounding Factor.

The remaining team members, alongside new arrivals, would work on the sequel Tomb Raider II which released a year after the original game and proved as big a commercial success. The development team were burned out by release due to the extreme crunch policy at Core Design. The vision for the franchise in late 1997 involved an expansion pack for Tomb Raider II, entitled The Further Adventures of Lara Croft, followed by a survival game called Tomb Raider III to be released two or three years later for the PlayStation 2. Eidos were initially behind this direction, but later were driven by a desire to have annual releases for the Christmas window. This led them to request that a second team be created to develop an expanded version of The Further Adventures and release that as Tomb Raider III in the interim. The decision was not communicated to the original team, which learned of the move only when Tomb Raider III was publicly announced as a 1998 title for the original PlayStation. They were exhausted and withdrew from the PlayStation 2 project in response, which was soon cancelled. The Tomb Raider II team did not work on the franchise again, with some team members going on to work on Project Eden.

Going forwards the franchise would be worked on by the Tomb Raider III team, and in line with Eidos' vision for the franchise they would aim for annual releases. Core Design's policy at the time involved years-long crunch periods, which placed strain on them and ultimately led to similar burnout. For this reason, and the feeling that they had exhausted the series' potential, the team tried to kill off Lara at the end of the fourth game, The Last Revelation. Eidos insisted that the series continue, and so Chronicles was developed by the Tomb Raider team while an additional group made preparations for the transition to PlayStation 2 with The Angel of Darkness. The Chronicles team strongly disliked being forced to continue the franchise, with the lead animator enjoying creating new death animations for Lara on that basis. The game was poorly received, with reviewers suggesting the series was growing stale. During this period, multiple handheld titles were developed by both Core Design and third-party developers.

The production of The Angel of Darkness was beset by problems from an early stage, with the team wanting to create a grander game to compete with contemporary action-adventure games. When the Chronicles team came back over to work on The Angel of Darkness, they found that production had completely "gone off the rails", with the entire project having been scrapped and restarted once already. Under pressure from Eidos, key sections of the game needed to be cut, and it was released before the team felt it was ready. It also suffered from crunch and burnout. The game received negative reactions from critics, and was cited by Paramount as the reason for the second Tomb Raider film underperforming.

While development of the next title Legend moved to Crystal Dynamics, Core Design continued to work on the franchise. A remake of the original game for PlayStation Portable was in development there, entitled 10th Anniversary. While Eidos had been averse to further Tomb Raider titles from the group, their recent purchase by SCi meant that the decision would now be made by the new parent company, and they were in favour. By 2006 the title was nearly finished, but after Crystal Dynamics sent a demo to SCi showing the first level of Legend running on PSP, 10th Anniversary was cancelled and Crystal Dynamics were charged with remaking the original instead. One of the key reasons for this was the fact that Crystal Dynamics had stronger capabilities to do a cross-platform launch. The decision "went down like a cup of cold sick" at Core Design. The studio attempted to reskin the title as a National Treasure or Indiana Jones game in the wake of the decision, but these did not come to fruition. The loss of the Tomb Raider IP was a factor in the studio's closure several years later.

=== Crystal Dynamics and Legend trilogy (2003–2008) ===
After the critical backlash against The Angel of Darkness, Eidos decided to take production of the Tomb Raider series out of Core Design's hands and give it to another subsidiary studio. Production of the next game was given to Crystal Dynamics in 2003, a studio that had made its name with the Legacy of Kain series. Eidos CEO Ian Livingstone stated that while the critical failure of The Angel of Darkness was a major reason for taking the series away from Core Design, the decision was motivated by their inordinate struggles with developing for the PlayStation 2, and by how many members of the Core team had complained that they were "burnt out" on Tomb Raider. He added that "for a UK company, moving the development of its prized asset from Derby to California was a big decision to make but, as it turned out, absolutely the right one to make". One of the main priorities for both Eidos and Crystal Dynamics was to regain the fanbase's trust in the brand, along with helping the series reclaim the status and selling power it had before The Angel of Darkness' release. Their main goal was to put Lara back inside tombs, with their physics-based engine enabling more intricate puzzles. Legend was well received, and was the first game in a rebooted trilogy. After Legend was finished, the team decided to celebrate the tenth anniversary of the series by remaking the original game, rebuilding the environments and redesigning the story to fit in with the events and gameplay of Legend. Alongside the development of Anniversary, an entry for seventh-generation hardware was in development, although it used established gaming architecture from Legend and this caused problems for the development team. This released as Tomb Raider: Underworld in 2008.

=== Square Enix acquisition and Survivor trilogy (2009–2022) ===
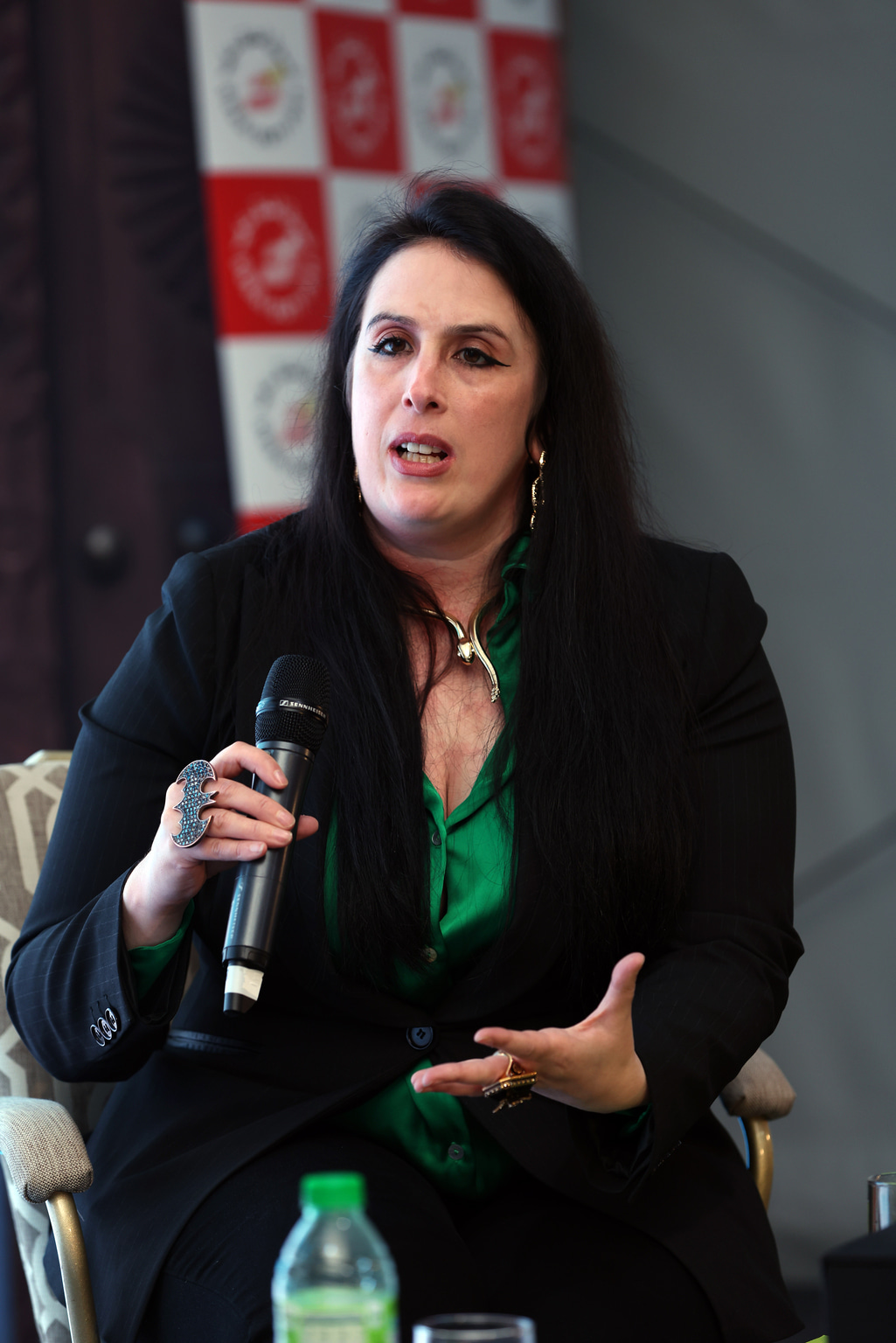
The first two Survivor trilogy games were written by Rhianna Pratchett

In 2009, the year after the release of Underworld, Eidos was bought by Square Enix and later renamed Square Enix Europe, giving Square Enix ownership of the Tomb Raider franchise. Development of Tomb Raider remained with Crystal Dynamics, now under the new structure. A new subseries began in 2010, billed simply as Lara Croft rather than Tomb Raider while using the aesthetics of the Legend continuity. The first of these was Lara Croft and the Guardian of Light, followed by Lara Croft and the Temple of Osiris in 2014. From 2015 the subseries aimed at the mobile format with Relic Run, and later Lara Croft Go which received critical acclaim.

During this period, a second development team was working on a second reboot of the series and character, which put emphasis on a darker and grittier interpretation of the character. Another priority was presenting Lara as a more human character, putting her in vulnerable situations, and showing how she begins her journey to becoming a "tomb raider" through both narrative and gameplay. The reboot, simply entitled Tomb Raider, was met with critical acclaim at launch in 2013, and became the start of the "Survivor Trilogy". A sequel, eventually revealed as Rise of the Tomb Raider, started development a few months after the reboot's release. In response to criticisms about a lack of classic tombs, more optional and story-based tombs were incorporated into the game. It continued the team's new portrayal of Lara, showing more sides to her character and her growing obsession with discovering the truth. In 2018, Shadow of the Tomb Raider was released to coincide with a new film starring Alicia Vikander as Lara Croft, simply titled Tomb Raider, taking heavy inspiration from the 2013 game of the same name. Shadow was developed by Eidos-Montréal as Crystal Dynamics completed Marvel's Avengers, though Crystal would provide secondary support. The game concluded Lara's origin story. A "Definitive Edition", featuring all 7 DLCs for Shadow was released in November 2019.

Following the conclusion of the Survivor trilogy, both Crystal Dynamics and Eidos-Montréal were busy with Marvel properties, and so there were no further Tomb Raider games for several years. In Crystal Dynamics' case, continued support for Marvel's Avengers lasted until 2023. A great many crossovers with other video game franchises were also developed beginning in 2014 and continuing into the early 2020s, with an article from Fandom Wire identifying 14 franchises that received crossovers, ranging from Fall Guys to Dead by Daylight. These were generally in the form of cosmetic additions or through Lara appearing as a playable character.

=== Embracer Group acquisition and re-releases (2022–present) ===
Embracer Group purchased a number of Square Enix Europe assets in May 2022 for $300 million, including Crystal Dynamics and the Tomb Raider franchise. The sale was for a comparatively low price, and was intended to fund Square Enix's disastrous pivot to NFT games in the early 2020s. Crystal Dynamics had previously announced the next main Tomb Raider title in 2021 as a game that would "unify the timelines", and combine elements from all three series, including the work of Core Design. In this timeline, Lara would be a seasoned adventurer. This instalment will use Unreal Engine 5, and will be published by Amazon Games. The mobile game Tomb Raider Reloaded was published by Square Enix London Mobile in 2023. The IP is held by Middle-earth Enterprises, a subdivision of Embracer.

The period also saw a number of re-releases in the form of collected editions and remasters. Feral Interactive's Lara Croft spin-offs were re-released as The Lara Croft Collection for Nintendo Switch in 2023. Aspyr released remasters of all six Core Design titles across two collections as Tomb Raider I–III Remastered and Tomb Raider IV–VI Remastered in 2024 and 2025, respectively. The remasters were made available for Nintendo Switch, PlayStation 4, PlayStation 5, Windows, Xbox One, and Xbox Series X/S. The Core Design games were also re-released in their original form for Evercade across two cartridges, with Tomb Raider Collection 1 covering the first three games, and Tomb Raider Collection 2 covering the fourth and fifth. The Evercade re-releases did not include The Angel of Darkness.

On December 11, 2025, during the Game Awards, two new separate entries were announced: Tomb Raider: Legacy of Atlantis and Tomb Raider: Catalyst, set for release in 2026 and 2027, respectively. Legacy of Atlantis is a remake of the original 1996 game developed by the Polish studio Flying Wild Hog, with modern game mechanics and graphics; while Catalyst is set in Northern India and follows Lara after a cataclysm reveals ancient secrets and the forces protecting them, while rival Treasure Hunters descend on the region. Both games will utilize Unreal Engine 5 and will use Alix Wilton Regan as the voice actress for Lara Croft. Catalyst is set "years after the events of Underworld" and treats the Survivor trilogy as Croft's origin story.

== Films and television ==
There were initially two film adaptations made in the early 2000s that starred Angelina Jolie as Lara Croft in Lara Croft: Tomb Raider in 2001 and its sequel, The Cradle of Life, in 2003. While both films were financially successful, neither of them were well received by critics. A reboot starring Alicia Vikander as Lara Croft was released in 2018, which was better received. A sequel of the 2018 film was in development with Vikander returning as Croft but it was later canceled with the film rights reverted to the game company and prompted a bidding war among studios. In January 2023, MGM sister company Amazon Studios (now known as Amazon MGM Studios) secured the rights to a new Tomb Raider reboot film, with Dmitri M. Johnson and his company dj2 Entertainment attached to produce. The film was intended to be interconnected with a television series from Phoebe Waller-Bridge and a video game from Crystal Dynamics, forming a Tomb Raider shared universe and franchise.

In 2007, an animated series based on Lara Croft titled Revisioned: Tomb Raider was produced and broadcast by GameTap as part of a series of re-imaginings of popular video game series. The series voiced by Minnie Driver ran between May and June 2007. Multiple noted animators and writers were involved with the series, including Peter Chung, Warren Ellis, Gail Simone and Jim Lee. While the production team had great creative freedom, they were given a basic guideline for the character by the developers so that Lara would not do anything out of character.

In 2021, Legendary Television announced an animated television series titled Tomb Raider: The Legend of Lara Croft that is set after the events of Shadow of the Tomb Raider. The first season was released in October 2024 on Netflix and the second and final season was released in December 2025.

Originally announced in May 2024, a live-action television series is currently in production at Amazon MGM Studios. Phoebe Waller-Bridge serves as the creator, writer, executive producer, and co-showrunner of the series alongside Chad Hodge with Story Kitchen's Dmitri M. Johnson, Michael Lawrence Goldberg, and Timothy I. Stevenson also executive producing. Sophie Turner was confirmed to portray Lara Croft in September 2025 with Sigourney Weaver, Martin Bobb-Semple, Jason Isaacs, Bill Paterson, Jack Bannon, John Heffernan, Celia Imrie, Paterson Joseph, Sasha Luss, Juliette Motamed, and August Wittgenstein joining the cast in January 2026.

== Music ==
The original Tomb Raider theme was composed by Nathan McCree. He created the original theme music after having discussions with Gard about the character of Lara Croft. Having decided to use Classical English music as an inspiration, he decided to create something simple for the theme song. Its simplicity made rearrangements and orchestrations easy. For his work on the first three Tomb Raider games, he was given fairly minimal briefs, and for Tomb Raider III he was working on the game as a freelancer as he had left the company. For The Last Revelation, Peter Connelly replaced Nathan McCree as the main composer, using McCree's music as a basis for his work. He composed the opening theme for The Last Revelation, saying that the opening melody came to him out of the blue, and added Egyptian motifs to fit in with the game's setting. Chronicles was originally going to have a sizeable original opening theme, but due to time constraints the majority of it ended up being discarded, much to Connelly's later regret. Only the opening segment survived. The music for The Angel of Darkness, composed by Connelly and Martin Iveson, was the one element of production that did not encounter problems, as recording was finished before the major content cuts happened. Scored using a full orchestra as opposed to the synthesised instruments of previous titles, it was performed by the London Symphony Orchestra.

For Legend, Troels Brun Folmann composed the music and managed the sound effects. Alongside composing a large amount of music for the game, he created micro-scores for small segments within gameplay. Folmann returned to score Anniversary, doing re-orchestrations of the original score, along with expanding them. For Underworld, Folmann handled the main theme while Colin O'Malley handled the rest of the soundtrack, which featured far less looping music than Legend. The 2013 reboot was scored by Jason Graves, who had become known through his work on the Dead Space franchise. Along with his orchestral style, he created a special instrument to create discordant sounds within the music, and musical elements from around the globe to represent the inhabitants of the game's island location. For Rise of the Tomb Raider, the composer was Bobby Tahouri, who had previously worked as assistant composer on video games and theatrical films. Guardian of Light used no original music, instead using extracts from the music of Legend, Anniversary and Underworld. The music for Temple of Osiris was written by Will Roget II, who had originally worked on licensed video games including Star Wars: The Old Republic. Temple of Osiris was the first title in the Lara Croft subseries to have an original score, using Egyptian and Middle Eastern musical elements while creating a new main theme that could be used in future Lara Croft games.

== Technology ==
Over the lifetime of the franchise, four custom proprietary game engines have been built to support the main titles. Shadow of the Tomb Raider (2018) was the final main series title to use a proprietary engine, as the franchise is now moving to Unreal Engine 5. The change reflects a wider industry shift in recent years away from proprietary engines.

=== Tomb Raider Engine (1994–2000) ===
The first Tomb Raider used a custom-built game engine, as other equivalent engines available to Core Design at the time were not versatile enough to realise the team's vision. The engine was designed by Paul Douglas, who handled the game's artificial intelligence (AI) and the three-dimensional (3D) graphics. The choice of a 3D game was influenced by the team's opinion that the game type was under-represented when compared to first-person shooters such as Doom. Its 3D style meant multiple elements were difficult to implement, including the AI and camera control. Another noted aspect was the multi-layered levels, as compared to equivalent 3D action-adventure games of the time which were limited to a flat-floor system. Lara's movements were hand-animated and coordinated rather than created using motion capture. The reason for this was that the team wanted uniformity in her movement, which was not possible with motion capture technology of the time. For Tomb Raider II, minor upgrades were made to the engine, with the main improvements being to the AI and smoothing out Lara's model. Tomb Raider III underwent major revisions, including rewrites to the graphics engine and improvements in the lighting and AI systems. The engine was given a major overhaul for The Last Revelation. The first five games make use of full-motion video cutscenes. For the first three games, they were primarily used as transitional periods depicting Lara moving from one level to another or one location to another. For Chronicles, fairly minor revisions were made.

=== Angel of Darkness Engine (2000–2003) ===
For The Angel of Darkness, a new engine was built from scratch, but due to being unfamiliar and unused to the technology of the PS2, the team encountered multiple problems such as needing to remove areas and characters due to polygon restrictions. Due to the deadlines imposed, the team were forced to cut corners, meaning that the game reached store shelves in a poor condition.

=== Crystal/Foundation Engine (2003–2019) ===
For Legend, the staff at Crystal Dynamics created a proprietary engine from the ground up, named the Crystal Engine. The engine and the game's content were developed in parallel, leading to scheduling and workload difficulties. Anniversary used the same engine as Legend. Underworld used a new engine built specifically for the game, although its basic codebase was shared with Legend. The group of developers who were working on this new engine were not tied specifically to the Underworld project, but rather shared by other projects, and this led to issues of prioritisation and communication. There were also problems with complicated dependencies and over-ambition. In Underworld, Lara's movements were animated using full motion capture, with Olympic gymnast Heidi Moneymaker providing the character's animations.

The Crystal Engine was modified with time and eventually re-titled "Foundation Engine", and remained in use through the 2010s. Lara's hair movements were made more realistic using TressFX in Tomb Raider and PureHair in Rise of the Tomb Raider. The version used for Shadow of the Tomb Raider featured new graphical enhancements from developer Eidos-Montréal.

== Cultural impact ==
Both the character of Lara Croft and the concepts behind the Tomb Raider franchise have evolved thematically and in popularity since the first game's release in 1996. The success of the game series led to several commercial tie-ins that further catapulted to cultural icon status, including feature spin-off games, feature films, and comics.

=== Tomb Raider nude code ===
Following the release of the first 1996 Tomb Raider video game there were online rumors about a Tomb Raider Nude Code, an internet online urban legend that the programmers of the Tomb Raider video game series had added a special nude cheat code that would turn the game's heroine, Lara Croft, completely naked during gameplay.

== Reception ==
Upon release, Tomb Raider became an unexpected success, reaching the top of sales charts and remaining for a time. It went on to sell over 7 million units worldwide. Tomb Raider II was a greater commercial success, with debut sales higher than the first game and total worldwide sales of 8 million units. The series sales continued to be strong until the release of Chronicles, which sold 1.5 million units. While The Angel of Darkness met with initial strong sales, it failed to meet expectations due to publisher pressure. Since the release of Legend, the series has picked up in terms of sales, popularity, and critical acclaim. The 2013 reboot sold 11 million units, becoming the most commercially successful Tomb Raider title to date. By 2021, the series had sold over 85 million units worldwide. In addition to the games' success, the 2001 film adaptation grossed $275 million, making it the highest-grossing video game adaptation until being overtaken in 2010 by Prince of Persia: The Sands of Time, and had the biggest opening weekend (US$47.7m) for an action film with a female lead since Aliens in 1986. Additionally, the first Tomb Raider comic book issue was the best-selling comic book of 1999. In 2018, The Strong National Museum of Play inducted the first Tomb Raider to its World Video Game Hall of Fame.

Multiple video game journalists, including Electronic Gaming Monthly's Crispin Boyer in 1997 and Eurogamer's Martyn Carroll in 2008, have cited the series as a pioneer in the medium, both laying the foundations for and popularising action-adventure and platforming games. Carrol credited the series for bringing video gaming out into the cultural mainstream. In a different article, Eurogamer cited The Angel of Darkness as a pioneer of mixing different video game genres. The public's reactions to the series over the years have conversely had a profound effect upon the series' direction and identity, as noted in a 2008 review of the series' history by Develop. In 2006, Tomb Raider was voted one of Britain's top 10 designs in the Great British Design Quest organised by the BBC and the Design Museum. The game appeared in a list of British design icons which included Concorde, Mini, World Wide Web, Grand Theft Auto, K2 telephone box, London tube map, AEC Routemaster bus, and the Supermarine Spitfire. In 2020, Tomb Raider featured on a series of UK postage stamps issued by the Royal Mail to celebrate classic UK video games.

The character of Lara Croft has similarly enjoyed popularity, standing out during her initial appearance in the male-dominated video game market, and continuing to stand out throughout the series' history. After her debut in 1996, Lara Croft was featured on the front cover of British culture magazine The Face, a position previously held by real-life celebrities. She similarly was featured in Irish rock band U2's PopMart Tour. The character was inducted onto the Walk of Game in 2006, and earned multiple mentions in the Guinness World Records: she was recognised as the "most successful human video game heroine" in 2006, and earned six awards in 2010. As part of the latter honours, Guinness World Records editor Gaz Deaves said that the character "epitomises all that's great about video gaming". The city of Derby, where Core Design was headquartered, has a street named "Lara Croft Way" and features the character in its walk of fame. In an article for 1UP.com, Jeremy Parish said that Lara's sex appeal was the main draw for early fans, a facet Eidos exploited for marketing and attempted to emulate in other products. He cited other writers' statements that her popularity stemmed from player empathy with her ability to survive tough situations, alongside contrasting against weaker female characters such as Princess Peach. However, alongside this praise, she has divided opinion as to her character design and consequent sexuality: she is both hailed as an empowering figure for women and a negative role model due to her hyper-sexualized and unrealistic appearance.
