= Wilbert Roget II =

American composer

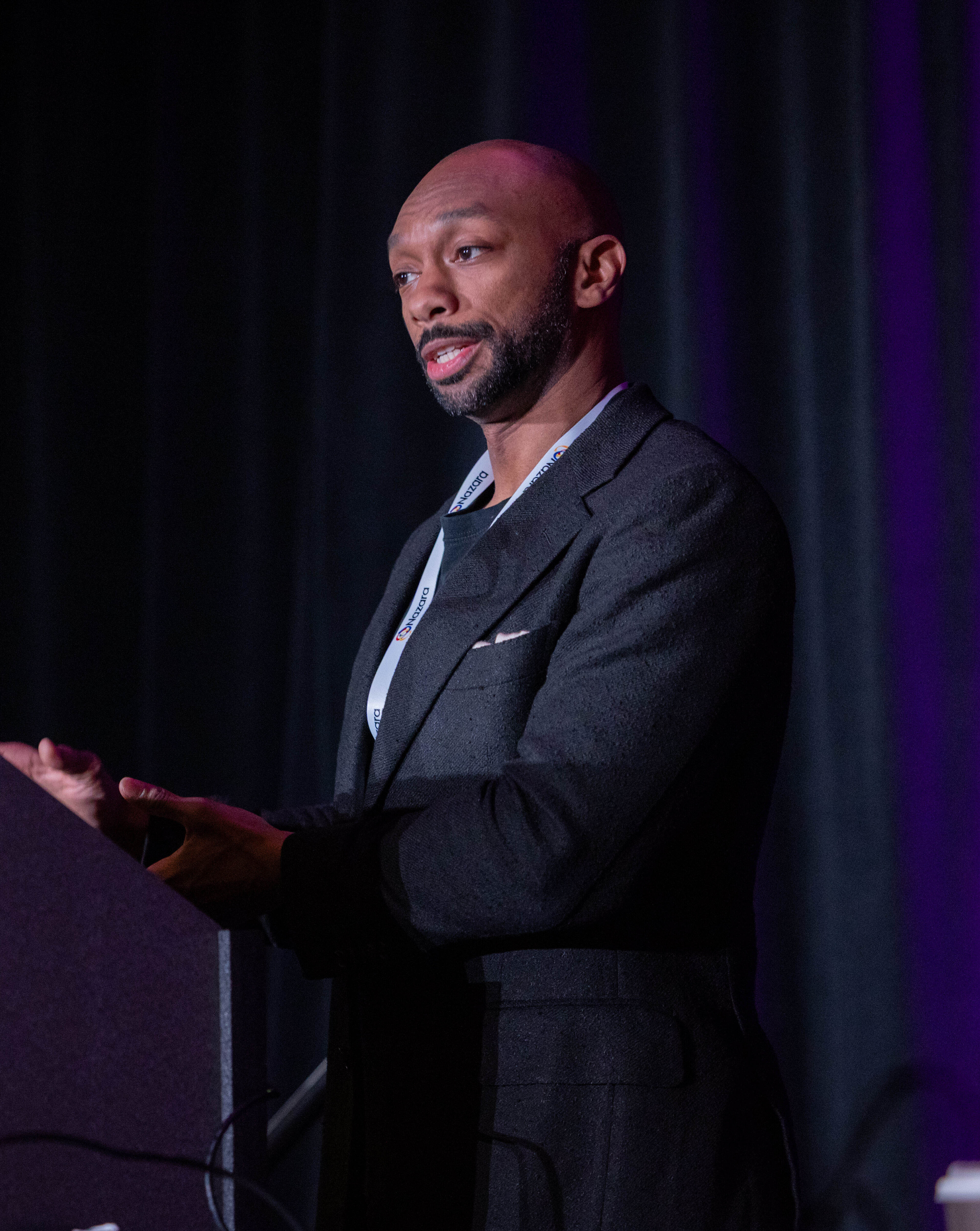
- Roget in 2025

Background information
- Born: December 7, 1983 (age 42); Philadelphia, Pennsylvania
- Genres: Video game score; film score
- Occupation: Composer
- Years active: 2006–present
- Labels: Materia Collective

Wilbert Roget II (born December 7, 1983) is an American composer known for his work on video game music, particularly Mortal Kombat 11 (2019), Call of Duty: WWII (2017), Lara Croft and the Temple of Osiris (2014), Helldivers 2 (2024), and Star Wars Outlaws (2024). His scores have won multiple awards and nominations from the Game Audio Network Guild, the Academy of Interactive Arts & Sciences, the BAFTA, and the National Academy of Recording Arts and Sciences.

== Early life and education ==
Roget grew up in Philadelphia and starting playing piano at the age of four. He became interested in the possibilities of cinematic storytelling in video games during high school, and found particular inspiration in Japanese video game and anime soundtracks such as Nobuo Uematsu's and Hitoshi Sakimoto's music for the Final Fantasy series and Yoko Kanno's music for Cowboy Bebop. He earned a BA in music at Yale University in 2005, studying with composition faculty including Kathryn Alexander and Matthew Suttor.

== Career ==
Roget joined LucasArts as a staff composer in 2008, where he scored Star Wars franchise games including Star Wars: The Old Republic and served as music editor on various titles. His final soundtrack for LucasArts was the unreleased Star Wars: First Assault, a live orchestral score recorded by the London Symphony Orchestra at Abbey Road Studios. He then left LucasArts to pursue a freelance career.

Working freelance, Roget has scored major titles such as Call of Duty: WWII, Lara Croft and the Temple of Osiris, and Mortal Kombat 11, as well as independent titles such as Anew: The Distant Light. He often records his own flute, keyboard, accordion, and guitar parts. When discussing his influences, he often cites classical music; for example, his Call of Duty score was influenced by Claude Vivier's "Zipangu," Toru Takemitsu's "Requiem for String Orchestra," and Krzysztof Penderecki's "Threnody for the Victims of Hiroshima." In Forbes, Erik Kain declared that the Call of Duty score made him "an instant fan."

Roget is also a sample library developer, and products from his audio software company Impact Soundworks are widely used in film and video game composition.

Although Roget works primarily in the music industry, he is also active in academic music programs. He served as visiting faculty at the San Francisco Conservatory of Music from 2018-2019 in the Department of Technology and Applied Composition, and has guest lectured at Yale University and the University of Rochester. In 2016, he completed a solo carillon commission, Island Stones, for the University of Michigan School of Music, Theatre & Dance. He has also given talks and appeared on panels at the Game Developers Conference, ASCAP Expo, PAX, PAX Dev, and MAGFest.

== Awards and recognition ==
Roget's scores have earned multiple awards and nominations from the Recording Academy, the Game Audio Network Guild (GANG) and the Academy of Interactive Arts and Sciences (AIAS). In 2025, Roget's score for Helldivers 2 earned him a "British Academy Games Award for Music" at the BAFTA Awards. Also in 2025, Roget's score for Star Wars Outlaws earned him a nomination for "Best Score Soundtrack for Video Games and Other Interactive Media" at the 67th Annual Grammy Awards. He also received two D.I.C.E. Award nominations for "Outstanding Achievement in Original Music Composition" at the 28th Annual D.I.C.E. Awards, for his works on Helldivers 2 (which he eventually won) and Star Wars Outlaws. In 2020, Roget's work on Mortal Kombat 11 garnered him another nomination for "Outstanding Achievement in Original Music Composition" at the 23rd Annual D.I.C.E. Awards. In 2018, he swept the GANG Awards for Music of the Year, Best Interactive Score, Best Original Instrumental (tied), Best Game Audio Article/Publication, and Best Soundtrack Album for his Call of Duty: WWII soundtrack, which was also nominated for the D.I.C.E. Award for "Outstanding Achievement in Original Music Composition." In 2014, his soundtrack for Lara Croft and the Temple of Osiris was nominated for the D.I.C.E. Award for "Outstanding Achievement in Original Music Composition", and the GANG Awards for Music of the Year and Best Original Instrumental. In 2012, his soundtrack for Star Wars: The Old Republic won the GANG Award for Best Original Instrumental. In 2009, his soundtrack for Star Wars: The Force Unleashed was nominated for three GANG Awards. He also received GANG Awards in 2011, 2010, and 2006.

== Discography ==
=== Composer ===
Video games
Title	Year	System	Notes
Star Wars: The Old Republic	2011	Windows	
Lara Croft and the Temple of Osiris	2014	PlayStation 4, Windows, Xbox One	
Guild Wars 2: Path of Fire	2017	Windows, Mac OS X	
Call of Duty: WWII	2017	PlayStation 4, Windows, Xbox One	
Destiny 2: Forsaken	2018	Stadia, PlayStation 4, Windows, Xbox One	
Mortal Kombat 11	2019	PlayStation 4, Xbox One, Windows, Nintendo Switch	Main theme and story mode music, gameplay music composed by Matthias Wolf and Armin Haas of Dynamedion.
Vader Immortal: A Star Wars VR Series	2019	Oculus Quest, Oculus Rift S	
Call of Duty: Mobile	2020–2021	Android, iOS	
Mortal Kombat 1	2023	PlayStation 5, Xbox Series X/S, Windows, Nintendo Switch	
Helldivers 2	2024	PlayStation 5, Windows, Xbox Series X/S	
Pacific Drive	2024	PlayStation 5, Windows	
Star Wars Outlaws	2024	PlayStation 5, Xbox Series X/S, Windows	

Animated series
Title	Year	Notes
Gundam: Requiem for Vengeance	2024	Netflix ONA series

=== Other credits ===
Video games
Title	Year	System	Notes
Star Wars: The Force Unleashed	2008	PlayStation 3, Xbox 360	Music editing and implementation
Star Wars: The Clone Wars – Jedi Alliance	2008	Nintendo DS	Music editor
Fracture	2008	PlayStation 3, Xbox 360	Music editor
Star Wars: The Clone Wars – Republic Heroes	2009	Microsoft Windows, Xbox 360, PlayStation 3, Wii, PlayStation Portable, PlayStation 2, Nintendo DS	Music assistant
Star Wars Battlefront: Elite Squadron	2009	PlayStation Portable, Nintendo DS	Music assistant
Lucidity	2009	Microsoft Windows, Xbox 360	Piano on "Carte d'Etoile"
Lego Indiana Jones 2: The Adventure Continues	2009	Macintosh, PlayStation 3, Wii, Windows, Xbox 360	Music editing
Indiana Jones and the Staff of Kings	2009	PlayStation 2, Wii	Music editing
Star Wars: The Force Unleashed II	2010	PlayStation 3, Windows, Xbox 360	Additional compositions, music editing
LEGO Star Wars III: The Clone Wars	2011	Nintendo 3DS, Nintendo DS, PlayStation Portable	Music editing
