= Tomb Raider: Curse of the Sword =

2001 video game

- North American box art
- Developer: Core Design
- Publisher: Activision
- Producers: Andy Watt; Mike Schmitt
- Designers: Jamie Morton; Paul Field
- Programmers: Dan Scott; Ian Manders
- Artist: Matt Charlesworth
- Composers: Manfred Linzner; Bernhard Wodok
- Series: Tomb Raider
- Platform: Game Boy Color
- Release: NA: 25 June 2001; EU: 17 August 2001
- Genre: Action-adventure
- Mode: Single-player

Tomb Raider: Curse of the Sword is an action-adventure video game, part of the Tomb Raider series, developed by Core Design and published by Activision under license from Eidos Interactive. It was released for the Game Boy Color in 2001, and is a sequel to the first Tomb Raider for the same system. The next Tomb Raider game for a handheld system was Tomb Raider: The Prophecy for the Game Boy Advance.

== Plot ==
A long time ago, an evil magician named Madame Paveau rose to power in the underworld of New Orleans using her dark magic and sacrificing humans. The underworld became synonymous with fear, and only with the aid of a powerful, benevolent magician could people rise up against her murderous control. After a mob broke into her mansion and burnt it down, the evil magician was destroyed. Her body was shattered upon jagged precipices on the bottom of a nearby cliff.

People believed they were safe from Madame Paveau and her devilish ways, but they were not aware that one of her apprentices had survived. He performed an ancient rite by her broken body and captured her soul in a sacred container. The minion began his search for a suitable body and the proper spells that would bring his master back to life.

In a dark antiquities museum, Lara Croft witnesses the theft of a powerful sword from the museum. In the confusion and chaos of the theft, Lara is cut by the sword. Her blood on the blade makes hers the body that is needed for the ritual. The minion sets off to gather the remaining objects needed to transfer Madame Paveau's soul into Lara's body.

Lara starts pursuing the cult, hoping to save her soul, eventually tracking them down to The Bahamas. Lara succeeds in retrieving the sword and breaks it in two, preventing Paveau from resurrecting.

== Development and release ==
Curse of the Sword was developed for the Game Boy Color by Tomb Raider series developers Core Design, who also developed the earlier GBC title. Dan Scott, the lead programmer enhanced the game engine used in the first title in the series. Staff included co-producers Andy Watt and Mike Schmitt, artist Matt Charlesworth, and designers Jamie Morton and Paul Field. Series owner Eidos Interactive were eager to have a Tomb Raider game release to coincide with the 2001 film adaptation. The music and audio were handled by Manfred Linzner and Bernhard Wodok of Shin'en; Curse of the Sword and its predecessor were among the company's first projects.

While the original GBC title was licensed out by Eidos to THQ, Curse of the Sword was licensed out to Activision. The game was announced by Eidos Interactive and Activision at E3 in May 2001. The game was released in North America on 25 June, and in Europe on 17 August.

== Reception ==
Reception

Aggregate score
Aggregator	Score
GameRankings	76.71%

The game received an average score of 76.71% at GameRankings, based on an aggregate of 7 reviews.
