= Nativex =

Nativex, LLC.
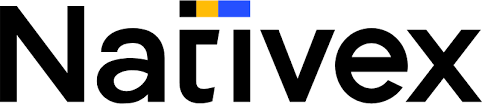
- Type: Private
- Industry: Mobile games, Advertising
- Founded: 2000
- Founders: Robert Weber; (co-founder); Ryan Weber; (co-founder)
- Headquarters: Singapore
- Area served: APAC, EMEA, North America, Latin America
- Parent: Mobvista
- Website: www.nativex.com

Nativex (formerly W3i) is a mobile advertising platform company headquartered in Singapore. Nativex is an authorized ad service provider for closed ecosystem media such as Tencent, Bytedance, UC & Baidu; 3rd-party programmatic platforms such as AppLovin, & Unity Ads; affiliate & influencer marketing partners such as InMobi; mobile OEM such as Huawei; attribution partners such as Google Tag Manager and Tenjin.

The company was listed in American City Business Journals' Fast 50 as one of the fastest-growing companies in Minneapolis–Saint Paul for 2013.

== Core Business ==
Nativex provides marketing services including media planning, ad placement, creative production, and advertising data analysis. It launched TopWorks Creative Studios in 2020.

== History ==
In 2000, twin brothers Rob and Ryan Weber founded Nativex as a desktop-based advertising company.

On March 1, 2016, Nativex announced that it has been acquired by Mobvista, the largest mobile ad network company in Asia, for $24.5 million.

In September 2020, Nativex launched TopWorks, a global creative network that helps advertisers create localized ad creatives. Since its launch, it has become an official TikTok Marketing Partner.

Nativex has established key partnerships over the years to expand its marketing service. It is now the official marketing partner of Kwai for Business and the official marketing agency for Sina Weibo, Xiaohongshu, Baidu, and BIGO Ads.
