= Shelley Blond =

British actress

- Born: 25 March 1970 (age 56); London, England
- Occupations: Actress; television presenter; author
- Years active: 1996–present
- Children: 2

Shelley Blond (born 25 March 1970) is an English actress.

== Career ==
Shelley Blond was the first voice actress for Lara Croft, lending her voice to the character in the first game. She was also several character voices in the computer game Black & White.

Blond appeared in Cold Feet as character Geraldine Hughes; as Michelle, Jez's girlfriend, in Peep Show; and the television film Cruise of the Gods as PA Romy as well as in West End musicals Only The Lonely (Patsy Cline) and Elvis, both for Bill Kenwright.

Blond has hosted Room Raiders, T99, and Trouble at Breakfast for Trouble TV, Crazy Drivers for Bravo and It's a Mystery for CITV as well as having starred in over 15 high-profile television commercials, including Toffee Crisp Clusters, David Gray's White Ladder album, Pot Noodle, Lambrini, and Celebrity Big Brother idents for Comic Relief.

She is the voice of Spooky Sister Amelia on Disney Channel's The Spooky Sisters, Cinderella in Snow White: The Sequel and Audrey Glamour in the 2014 film Moomins on the Riviera. She is the long-standing regular voice for ITV, Discovery Channel, National Geographic Channel, History/Bio/Crime & Investigation channels, FX, Virgin Media On Demand, and is the voice for numerous cartoons, commercials, and jingles.

Also an author, her children's books, The Multi-Coloured Bird and The Lonely Spider are published by Five Dads Ltd.

== Filmography ==
=== Film ===
| Year | Title | Role | Notes |
|---|---|---|---|
| 2002 | Cruise of the Gods | PA Romy | Television film |
| 2007 | Snow White: The Sequel | Cinderella | Voice |
| 2009 | Tranquility | Therapist | Short film |
| 2014 | Moomins on the Riviera | Audrey Glamour | Voice |

=== Television ===
| Year | Title | Role | Notes |
|---|---|---|---|
| 2000 | Cold Feet | Geraldine Hughes | Episode: "Episode #3.2" |
| 2001 | The Bill | Miriam Sadler | Episode: "Tolerance: Part 2" |
| 2004 | The Spooky Sisters | Amelia | Voice |
| 2004 | Casualty | Jenny Lindsey | Episode: "Finding Faith" |
| 2005 | Peep Show | Michelle | Episode: "Mugging" |

=== Video games ===
| Year | Title | Role | Notes |
|---|---|---|---|
| 1996 | Tomb Raider | Lara Croft | Voice |
| 1998 | Tomb Raider: Unfinished Business | Lara Croft | Voice; archived audio; expansion pack for Tomb Raider (1996) |
| 2001 | Black & White | Additional Voices | Voice |
| 2022 | Tomb Raider Reloaded | Lara Croft | Voice; launch only. |
| 2023 | Cashville | Irene Adler | Voice; archived audio |
| 2024 | Tomb Raider I–III Remastered | Lara Croft | Voice; archived audio; remasters for Tomb Raider I and Unfinished Business only |
