= Tomb Raider III =

1998 video game

- Developer: Core Design (Note: Mac OS version developed by Westlake Interactive.)
- Publisher: Eidos Interactive (Note: Mac OS version published by Aspyr.)
- Producer: Troy Horton
- Designers: Jamie Morton; Richard Morton; Andrew Sandham
- Programmers: Chris Coupe; Martin Gibbins
- Writer: Vicky Arnold
- Composer: Nathan McCree
- Series: Tomb Raider
- Platforms: Microsoft Windows; PlayStation; Mac OS
- Release: Windows, PlayStation: EU: 20 November 1998; NA: 24 November 1998; Mac OS: NA: 19 October 1999
- Genre: Action-adventure
- Mode: Single-player

Tomb Raider III (also known as Tomb Raider III: Adventures of Lara Croft) is an action-adventure video game developed by Core Design and published by Eidos Interactive. It was first released for PlayStation and Microsoft Windows in 1998, and for Mac OS in 1999. It is the third title in the Tomb Raider series, following Tomb Raider II (1997). The story follows archaeologist-adventurer Lara Croft as she embarks upon a quest to recover four pieces of a meteorite that are scattered across the world. To progress through the game, the player must complete a series of levels that involve solving puzzles, traversing dangerous locations, and defeating enemies.

Tomb Raider III was built on an upgraded version of the Tomb Raider engine that was used by its predecessors. The engine offers better speed efficiency and new graphical features such as coloured lighting and triangular polygons, allowing developers to achieve greater detail and more complex geometry. The game was designed to be more in line with the puzzle-solving gameplay of the original Tomb Raider as opposed to the more shooting-oriented style of Tomb Raider II.

Accompanied by an extensive marketing campaign, Tomb Raider III was a commercial success, selling around six million copies worldwide. Although the game received generally favourable reviews, it did not fare as well as its predecessors, with critics generally agreeing that the game failed to change the same tried and tested formula. The game's difficult and unforgiving gameplay also received some criticism. A sequel, Tomb Raider: The Last Revelation, was released in 1999. A stand-alone expansion for Tomb Raider III featuring six new levels, subtitled The Lost Artefact, was released in 2000. A remastered version of the game, alongside The Lost Artefact, was included in Tomb Raider I–III Remastered in 2024.

== Gameplay ==
The player, controlling Lara Croft from a third-person perspective, progresses through the game's Nevada Desert level.

Tomb Raider III is a single-player action-adventure game where the player controls the protagonist, Lara Croft, from a third-person perspective through five locations: India, South Pacific, London, Nevada, and Antarctica. Once the player completes the first location (India), the following three (South Pacific, London, and Nevada) can be played in any order before the final location (Antarctica) closes the game. Each location features a series of enclosed levels that involve solving puzzles, jumping over obstacles, and defeating enemies. Most puzzles involve rearranging items, manipulating switches, or pushing objects. As Lara, the player can run, jump, climb, crawl, "monkey swing" across certain overhead frames, and swim and dive underwater for a limited period of time. Lara can sprint to gain a temporary burst of greater speed while running, which is useful for escaping errant boulders and other immediate disasters.

To defeat enemies, the player can use a variety of weapons, including dual pistols, dual Uzis, a Desert Eagle, a shotgun, an MP5 submachine gun, a grenade launcher, a rocket launcher, and a harpoon gun for underwater use. The dual pistols have infinite ammunition and are Lara's default weapons, while the other weapons have finite ammunition and must be found in the levels. At one point in the game, Lara is stripped of all her weapons, leaving the player defenceless and forced to use stealth, before recovering her pistols later. Lara has a certain amount of health that decreases if she falls from a great height or when she is attacked by enemies. If Lara's health is fully depleted, the player must start the game again from a previous save point. Saving the player's progress on the PlayStation version of the game requires a memory card and consumes a Save Crystal from Lara's inventory. These can be found throughout each level and do not require the player to save the game at the pick-up spot.

A significant portion of the game takes place underwater. Some pools are inhabited by piranhas that can kill Lara within seconds, while others have streams with currents that can pull her in a fixed direction, preventing the player from being able to swim back or grab onto a ledge. Furthermore, the water in the Antarctica levels is too cold for Lara to swim through for more than a few seconds. The player can also wade through quicksand, but at the risk of drowning Lara. Some levels require the player to use vehicles. For example, the kayak helps Lara fight her way down rapids in the Madubu Gorge level, while an underwater propeller unit allows her to explore deep water areas in the Lud's Gate level. Other vehicles include a quad bike, a boat, and minecarts. Flares may be used to explore darkened areas. Ammunition, flares, and health recovery items are dispersed among the levels to help players increase their resources. The game features a tutorial level where the player can practise Lara's moves and combat abilities.

== Plot ==
A corporation called RX-Tech excavates the crash site of a meteorite that impacted on Antarctica millions of years ago and finds strange Rapa Nui-like statues alongside the grave of one of HMS Beagle's sailors. Meanwhile, archaeologist-adventurer Lara Croft is searching for an artefact known as the Infada Stone in the ruins of an ancient Indian Hindu temple once inhabited by the Infada tribe. After taking the artefact from a researcher working for RX-Tech, Lara is approached by RX-Tech scientist Dr. Willard, who explains that Polynesians came across a meteorite crater in Antarctica thousands of years ago and found that it held incredible power. Using rock from the meteorite, they crafted four crystalline artefacts, one of which is the Infada Stone. They fled Antarctica for unknown reasons, but in the 19th century, a group of sailors travelling with Charles Darwin came to Antarctica and rediscovered the artefacts. The four artefacts were distributed across the globe. Dr. Willard has been able to track the artefacts by using the diary of one of the sailors. Lara agrees to help him find the other three.

Travelling to a South Pacific island in Indonesia, Lara encounters a wounded soldier who gives her hints about the existence of Puna, a powerful deity. While pursuing Puna, Lara learns that one of Darwin's sailors brought one of the artefacts to the island. She infiltrates a temple and defeats Puna, who has immense power granted by the second artefact, the Ora Dagger. In London, Lara searches for the third artefact, the Eye of Isis, now in the possession of Sophia Leigh, the head of a cosmetics corporation. Lara learns that the corporation has performed experiments on humans in order to achieve immortality and eternal youth for Sophia's personal gain. Lara confronts Sophia in her office and ultimately obtains the artefact. In Nevada, Lara makes her way through a desert canyon and tries to enter Area 51, where the fourth artefact, Element 115, is located in an alien spacecraft guarded by the US government. She is taken prisoner after her attempted break-in fails. Freeing herself, she escapes the security compound and stows away in a truck to Area 51, where she obtains the artefact.

After collecting all four artefacts, Lara travels to Antarctica and discovers that Dr. Willard had been using the knowledge gained from the meteorite to perform experiments on his own men, turning them into horrible mutations. Angered by this revelation, she confronts Dr. Willard, who reveals that he is planning to encourage the mutations, only on a global scale, using the combined power of the artefacts and the meteorite from which they were carved. As Lara voices her opposition to his operation, Willard betrays her, steals the artefacts, and disappears into the RX-Tech excavation site. After fighting more mutants and navigating the treacherous ruins of the ancient city of Tinnos built atop the meteorite crater, Lara faces Willard, who has now used the power of the four artefacts to greatly speed up the evolutionary processes of the human body and thereby turned himself into a spider-like creature. Lara deactivates the meteorite by recovering the artefacts, kills the mutated Willard, and escapes by helicopter.

== Development ==
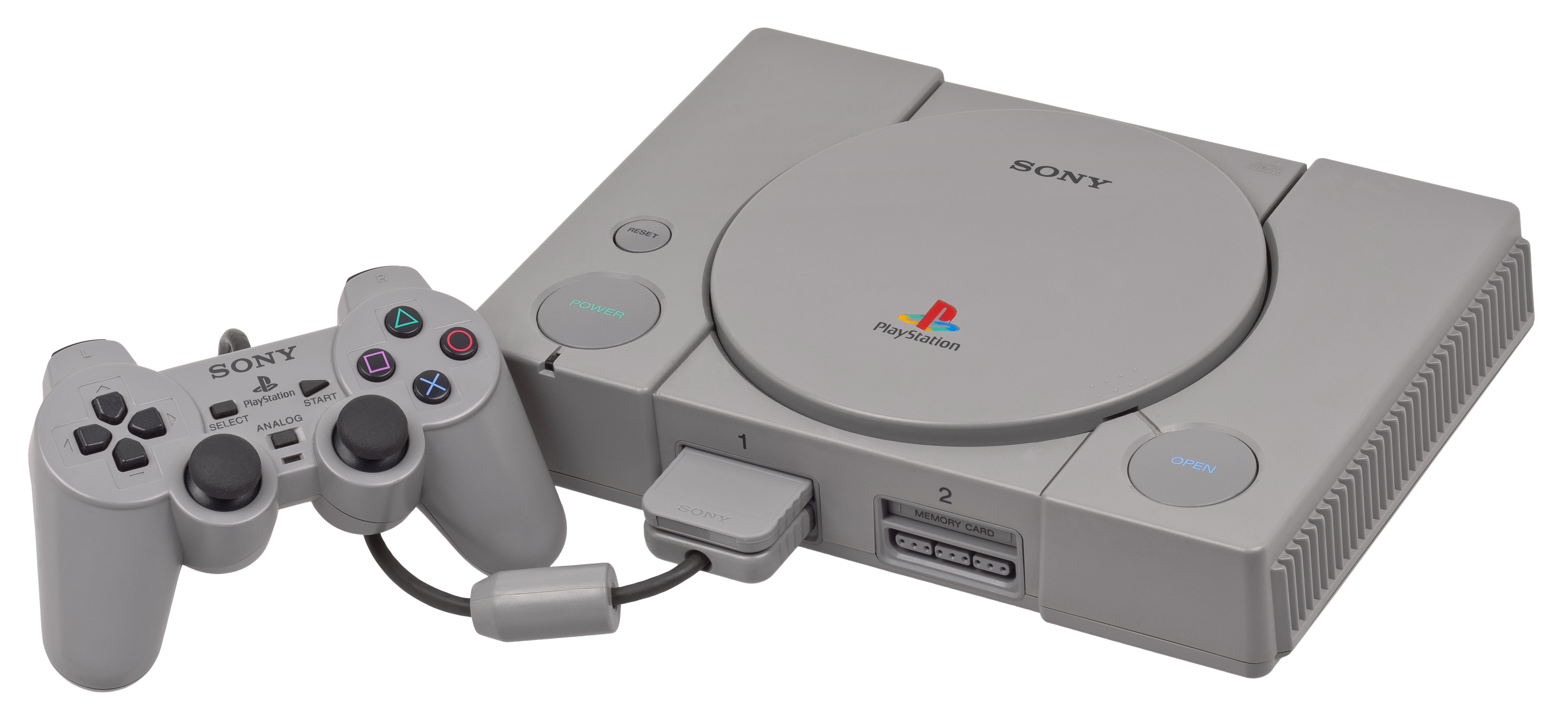
Unlike its predecessors, Tomb Raider III was primarily developed for the PlayStation console.

As the development of Tomb Raider II concluded in late 1997, Core Design considered plans for a sequel. The fact that the second game was selling very well dispelled the team's fears that the franchise was a one-hit wonder, and led to the scoping of a continuation for the franchise. Development on Tomb Raider III began that December. The project originated as an extension of The Further Adventures of Lara Croft, which had been planned as a seven level expansion pack for Tomb Raider II. The final game retained a shortened Adventures of Lara Croft subtitle. It was developed by the expansion pack team- a new group formed from other Core Design developers- rather than the Tomb Raider II team.

The PlayStation served as the lead platform for the game, while the Microsoft Windows release is a conversion with slightly improved visuals. As a result, everything was built around the capabilities of the PlayStation hardware, with 16-bit palettes and high-resolution graphics, as opposed to the 8-bit palettes and "pseudo medium" resolution of the earlier titles, as Core Design CEO Jeremy Smith recalled. It made use of a revised engine featuring changes from Martin Gibbins, who previously worked on the 1996 title Blam! Machinehead. The upgraded engine offered better speed efficiency and new graphical features. While both the original Tomb Raider and Tomb Raider II used a grid system where developers could build the levels with a set of blocks, Tomb Raider III's system incorporated triangular polygons, allowing developers to achieve greater detail and more complex architectural structures. The triangles also allowed developers to implement the game's quicksand and rippling water features. The dynamic lighting system was improved with coloured lighting and better water reflection, making Tomb Raider III more atmospheric than its predecessors. The team also implemented new weather effects such as rain, snow, and wind. The game features more particle effects, offering more realistic explosions and smoke. All the textures used in the game were drawn in true colour before being rendered by the graphics engine, resulting in a better output quality.

Tomb Raider III was designed more in line with the puzzle-solving gameplay of the original Tomb Raider as opposed to the more shooting-oriented style of Tomb Raider II. The levels were designed to be less linear than before with the goal of giving players multiple routes to complete each one. The game's five locations were decided upon before the plot was conceived. According to producer Mike Schmitt, the team opted to "just take a globe, spin it, and see where it lands, and whether it's an interesting location or not". Once the setting had been decided upon, a storyline linking all the locations was written. Lara's range of abilities was expanded with moves such as the duck, crawl, dash, and "monkey swing". The 1995 film Desperado was an influence on Lara's gun play and new moves. Developers initially considered the possibility of implementing hand-to-hand combat, but the idea was rejected because it would have required giving enemies new combat animations.

Dr. Tom Scutt, a specialist with a Ph.D in artificial intelligence was hired to enhance the game's artificial intelligence and give enemies more lifelike behaviour. In previous Tomb Raider games, enemies would simply run at Lara and attack immediately, whereas in Tomb Raider III, enemies can pop out of the dark and attack the player, or retreat back into the level and regroup to attack later. Stealth features partially inspired by the 1997 first-person shooter GoldenEye 007 were introduced, giving players the ability to avoid detection by sneaking behind enemies. New vehicles that are critical to complete certain levels were added; the team also experimented with the idea of putting Lara on horseback, but they ultimately discarded it. The London section of the game was originally intended to feature an additional level set in a cathedral, but was removed from the main story due to its high difficulty and kept instead as a bonus available after collecting secrets. The development of the game took eleven months to complete, and incorporating all the new ideas into the engine was considered the most difficult task of the project.

=== PlayStation 2 version ===
In late 1997, a survival game entitled Tomb Raider III was in early development for the PlayStation 2. In interviews conducted for The Making of Tomb Raider, most staff indicated that a two-year development cycle was planned, though Heather Gibson stated that it would have been three years. The team intended to make major changes for the sequel, as they did not want to simply make another game with the same engine and gameplay. The team intended to develop a new engine and animation system and add survival elements. The game would have had a remote island setting and a need for Lara to find food and water. Gavin Rummary indicated that it would not have been similar to the 2013 reboot.

Eidos however intended to pursue annual releases for the franchise, and wanted a game ready for Christmas 1998. They instead had a new team formed of other Core Design developers work on an expanded version of The Further Adventures of Lara Croft which would be released as a standalone Tomb Raider III. Their intention at the time was that the original team would continue working on the PlayStation 2 title in the interim as a future mainline entry for the franchise. Eidos did not notify the developers of the production change; Gavin Rummary indicated that they only became aware when Tomb Raider III was announced to the public as a PlayStation title. The original team was burned out from the extreme crunch for the previous games, and were concerned about conflicts between the two projects. "it was just too much", according to Stuart Atkinson. The survival game concept persisted without the Tomb Raider IP briefly, but the team were ultimately moved to work on Project Eden (2001). There would be no Tomb Raider game for the PlayStation 2 until The Angel of Darkness (2003).

== Marketing ==
The release of Tomb Raider III was accompanied by an extensive marketing campaign. To promote the game, English model Nell McAndrew was hired to appear as Lara Croft on a press tour across Italy, Spain, Germany, the US, and Australia. McAndrew made appearances on various multimedia outlets, including TV shows, radio stations, and department stores, while Lara Croft appeared on the front cover of most UK games magazines. Other highlights included French TV advertisements for the SEAT car manufacturer and a music video for the German band Die Ärzte. British sports lifestyle brand Animal designed and merchandised a range of Lara Croft clothes and accessories, while Core Design launched its own clothing articles. In May 1998, a demonstration of the game was presented at the Electronic Entertainment Expo in Atlanta, Georgia. The show included a virtual appearance of Lara, which allowed the audience to ask her questions. According to Core Design's public relations manager Susie Hamilton, a total of £1.7 million was spent on the marketing campaign.

Like its predecessor, Tomb Raider III had a launch party at the Natural History Museum, London. A short film was shot for the event, entitled Tomb Raider: The Trilogy. The tongue-in-cheek film featured a gamer being interrogated by the Police about their obsession with Lara Croft. Afterwards the film remained on a digibeta tape that was rediscovered by Janey de Nordwall, handed over to Square Enix; and eventually released on YouTube in 2016.

== Releases ==
Tomb Raider III was released for the Microsoft Windows and PlayStation platforms in Europe on 20 November 1998, and in North America on 24 November. Upon release, some minor bugs in the game were detected, the most significant of which prevented players from completing the Temple Ruins level if they saved the game in a specific area and then went back to that area. Although the bugs in the Microsoft Windows version were addressed with the release of a patch, they remained in the original PlayStation discs. To prevent further issues, Core Design quickly burned new gold discs with an updated version of the game. A port, developed by Westlake Interactive and published by Aspyr, was released for Mac OS computers in 1999. A stand-alone expansion, titled Tomb Raider III: The Lost Artefact, was released for Microsoft Windows and Mac OS computers in March 2000. Unlike the main game, the expansion was developed by a separate Eidos team. It includes six levels set in Scotland, the Channel Tunnel, and France, where Lara must learn of the existence of a fifth meteorite piece called the Hand of Rathmore. In 2011, Tomb Raider III was released as a "PSOne Classic" on the PlayStation Network.

Tomb Raider III and The Lost Artefact were released as part of Tomb Raider I–III Remastered, a high-definition remaster for Nintendo Switch, PlayStation 4, PlayStation 5, Windows, Xbox One, and Xbox Series X/S. Released in February 2024, it was developed and published by Aspyr in partnership with Crystal Dynamics. The remaster includes options for new control schemes, and revamped graphics.

== Reception ==
Reception

Aggregate scores
Aggregator	Score
GameRankings	78% (PS); 73% (PC)
Metacritic	76/100

Review scores
Publication	Score
Computer and Video Games	5/5
Edge	8/10
Electronic Gaming Monthly	7/10, 7.5/10, 5.5/10, 7.5/10
EP Daily	7.5/10
Famitsu	30/40
Game Informer	9/10
GameRevolution	C+
GameSpot	7.5/10 (PS); 6.9/10 (PC)
IGN	8/10 (PS); 7.7/10 (PC)
Next Generation	4/5
Official U.S. PlayStation Magazine	3.5/5

Although Tomb Raider III received generally favourable reviews from critics, it did not fare as well as its two predecessors. Edge considered Tomb Raider III "a valid addition to the growing franchise", stating that it offers more attractive graphics and more innovation than Tomb Raider II, while Next Generation called it the biggest and most rewarding game of the series. CVG described it as a perfect mix of the exploration and puzzles of the original, in addition of more shooting elements in the game. Other critics, however, felt that the game failed to change the same tried and tested formula. In its review, IGN said that Tomb Raider III added nothing revolutionary in its formula.

Writing for GameSpot, reviewer Joe Fielder highlighted the graphics for their new lighting effects and varied textures, saying that they improve the gameplay experience because they make it easier for players to identify ledges and jump-off points. Douglass Perry of IGN remarked that the upgraded engine made the game look better than its predecessors, but overall considered Tomb Raider III to be outdated, especially when compared to newer engines that were released at the time. Andy McNamara of Game Informer said that although the graphics and lighting were superior to the previous games, the effect would not be noticeable unless compared to them. Edge felt that the old controls did not suit the more complex environments and criticised the game's lack of narrative and cinematic presentation.

The game's difficult and unforgiving gameplay frustrated critics. Game Revolution explained that, while in previous Tomb Raider games instant death was when trying to rush through an area, every step in Tomb Raider III is a potential threat of instant death. The publication went so far as to call Tomb Raider III "a marketing concept", proclaiming that the game is so difficult that it is impossible to beat without buying a strategy guide. Similarly, Electronic Gaming Monthly criticised the game for being rushed and highly frustrating. The magazine also remarked that the stealth elements in the Nevada levels were ineffective, especially when compared to Konami's Metal Gear Solid.

The game's new vehicles, improved artificial intelligence of enemies, and nonlinear gameplay were generally highlighted positively. The Electric Playground said that progressing through the different locations in a nonlinear fashion makes Lara's adventuring more diverse and rewarding. CVG's Alez Huhtala praised the fact that players must collect Save Crystals to save their progress in the PlayStation version of the game, as he felt that Tomb Raider II's option to save the game at any time made the game very easy and removed tension. In contrast, Joe Rybicki of Official U.S. PlayStation Magazine felt that the save system was a poor return and aspect from the original game, making Tomb Raider III much more frustrating, but ultimately recommended it for its addictive gameplay.

=== Sales ===
Upon release, Tomb Raider III topped the UK games charts and was the German market's second-best-selling video game of 1998, behind Anno 1602. In its first month of release in the United States, it was the sixth best-selling home console game. At the 1999 Milia festival in Cannes, it took home a "Platinum" prize for revenues above €68 million in the European Union during the previous year. This made it the highest-grossing game in Europe for 1998. As of 2009, Tomb Raider III had sold around six million copies worldwide.
