= Tomb Raider: The Prophecy =

2002 video game

- Developer: Ubi Soft Milan
- Publisher: Ubi Soft
- Producer: Nicola Aitoro
- Designer: Riccardo Landi
- Composer: Lionel Payet-Pigeon
- Series: Tomb Raider
- Platform: Game Boy Advance
- Release: NA: 12 November 2002; EU: 15 November 2002
- Genre: Action-adventure
- Mode: Single-player

Tomb Raider: The Prophecy is a 2002 action-adventure video game developed by Ubi Soft Milan and published by Ubi Soft for the Game Boy Advance. Part of the Tomb Raider series, it follows protagonist Lara Croft as she explores multiple temples in search of keys to a world-destroying power. Gameplay features exploration, combat and platforming displayed from a top-down isometric perspective.

== Gameplay ==
Lara Croft faces off against a skeleton warrior in King Heort's Tomb. Her health and choice of weaponry is visible in the top right.

Unlike previous handhelds in the series such as the Tomb Raider: Curse of the Sword, which played in a side-scrolling two-dimensional form, reminiscent of 8-bit games, The Prophecy instead plays in an isometric viewpoint, giving the player a viewpoint from above the player character's head. The game contains many familiar elements of the franchise such as being able to jump, run, climb and shoot. As the game was the first Tomb Raider to be rendered in an isometric view until Lara Croft and the Guardian of Light, the game was also given a new combat system to suit the view style. The system does not include the regular player-controlled lock on gun play of previous games. It does instead contain an auto-lock system to make combating enemies easier. There are three weapons that the player can use: Lara's signature handguns, Uzi pistols and golden guns. The controls were designed to be simple, with the directional pad assigned to movement, the A button is used as a jump button, the R button pulls out or holsters weapons, and the L button allows the player to sprint.

== Plot ==
The game is based around an ancient prophecy written in the Tome of Ezekiel, which tells of three magical stones, used by various powerful rulers around the world. Lara Croft must find these stones before a cult known as the Teg-du-Bhorez can collect them all and use them to revive a mystical being known as the Great Grey One, thus bringing about the end of the world. Throughout the game Lara searches for the stones and thinks that she has found them. However, she realises that she was mistaken and has to come back to defeat the game's villain.

== Development ==
Tomb Raider: The Prophecy was developed for the Game Boy Advance by Ubi Soft Milan, a division of Ubi Soft, under license from Tomb Raider owners Eidos Interactive. During this period, series developer Core Design, who had worked on the previous portable Tomb Raider titles for Game Boy Color, was developing the next mainline title The Angel of Darkness (2003). The development team was eleven people, all veterans of developing for the Game Boy portable console family. The staff included producer Nicola Aitoro, Riccardo Landi as lead designer, and Lionel Payet-Pigeon as composer. The team designed the environments, characters and camera movements to reproduce established elements from the main series. Lara's moveset was modelled on the first two Tomb Raider games. A challenge for the team was giving Lara smooth animations within the limited hardware, with one of the sacrifices being the ability to use two-handed weapons such as the shotgun.

The Prophecy was announced in May 2002: its full title was given as "Lara Croft Tomb Raider: The Prophecy". The game was released in North America on 12 November that year. It later released in Europe on 15 November, and in Japan on 6 December.

== Reception ==
Reception

Aggregate score
Aggregator	Score
Metacritic	66/100

Review scores
Publication	Score
Eurogamer	6/10
GameSpy	3/5
GameZone	7/10

Tomb Raider: The Prophecy received "mixed or average" reviews, according to review aggregator Metacritic.

The game received a 3 1/2-out-of-5 score from GameSpy reviewer Scott Steinberg, who praised it for the aesthetic effects of the game camera, which give the illusion that the player can see into a 3-dimensional space. However, Steinberg criticized the repetitive nature of the game, as it largely consists of the player having to trigger a switch, and opening a door or shutting off a trap, only to come to the next switch and repeat it again. GameSpy concluded that although the game has some merits, it falls short in terms of gameplay standards of many of its greatest assets are related to audio and visuals.

The Prophecy was a runner-up for GameSpot's annual "Best Action Game on Game Boy Advance" award, which went to Metroid Fusion.
