= Lara Croft and the Temple of Osiris =

2014 video game

- Developer: Crystal Dynamics (Note: Ported to Microsoft Windows and PlayStation 4 by Nixxes Software)
- Publisher: Square Enix
- Composer: Wilbert Roget II
- Series: Tomb Raider
- Platforms: PlayStation 4; Windows; Xbox One; Stadia; Nintendo Switch
- Release: PlayStation 4, Windows, Xbox One; 9 December 2014; Stadia; 22 December 2020; Nintendo Switch; 29 June 2023
- Genres: Action-adventure, Twin-stick shooter
- Modes: Single-player, multiplayer

Lara Croft and the Temple of Osiris is an action-adventure game developed by Crystal Dynamics and published by Square Enix for Windows, PlayStation 4 and Xbox One. It is the sequel to the 2010 video game Lara Croft and the Guardian of Light, and the second installment in Lara Croft spin-off series of the Tomb Raider franchise. The game was released on 9 December 2014. It was released on Stadia on 22 December 2020.

The game was released along with its predecessor as part of The Lara Croft Collection for Nintendo Switch by Feral Interactive on 29 June 2023.

== Gameplay ==
Temple of Osiris features cooperative gameplay for up to four players.

Like its predecessor, Lara Croft and the Guardian of Light , Lara Croft and the Temple of Osiris is a non-linear "arcade-inspired" action game with a fixed isometric camera, similar to Tomb Raider: The Prophecy for Game Boy Advance. Additionally, the colored circle underneath each player in tandem with the twin-stick control scheme draws total gameplay comparisons to SpongeBob SquarePants: Plankton's Robotic Revenge, Ratchet & Clank: All 4 One, or Contra: Rogue Corps. It features cooperative gameplay, and up to four players can take control of one of four characters, Lara Croft, Carter Bell, Isis or Horus. Each playable character possesses unique weapons and skills. As with some previous installments, Lara retains her dual pistols with infinite ammunition and a grappling hook, which she is able to use to cross gaps.

== Plot ==
Deep in the deserts of Egypt, Lara Croft joins forces with rival treasure hunter Carter Bell and imprisoned gods Isis and Horus, to defeat the evil deity Set. Lara and her companions battle the elements of nature through ancient tombs and they must recover the fragments of Osiris to stop Set from enslaving all humanity.

== Development ==
Crystal Dynamics began development on Temple of Osiris in 2013, following the release of Tomb Raider. Nixxes Software provided development support on the game; they had collaborated with Crystal Dynamics on previous Tomb Raider games. In a 2022 interview with Digital Foundry, composer Wilbert Roget II stated that Crystal Dynamics had originally planned for the Lara Croft brand to become its own spin-off franchise from the Tomb Raider IP. The studio completed development in November 2014. That month, Valve and Crystal Dynamics organized a contest for people to produce and submit promotional Tomb Raider themed content for the video game Team Fortress 2. The winning items were revealed on 3 December and were implemented in Team Fortress 2 as rewards for people who pre-purchased Temple of Osiris. Contest winners received a selection of titles from Square Enix's catalogue on Steam.

== Release ==
The game launched on 9 December 2014. The studio released the game's original soundtrack as a free download. A limited Gold Edition of the game was available to purchase; it included a 3-inch Lara figurine, art book, a map of the game's overworld, and a season pass for downloadable content (DLC). The game was released as part of PlayStation Plus free games in August 2015. The game was released as part of Microsoft Games with Gold free games in May 2017.

Prior to the game's launch, a season pass was announced which would include all future downloadable content for the game. Four downloadable content packs were released in January 2015, three of which contained in-game items and character skins based on Tomb Raider: Legend, and the Deus Ex and Hitman franchises. These themed packs were previously available as bonuses for pre-ordering the game from specific retailers. The fourth content pack, titled Icy Death, added various in-game items, a tomb featuring new puzzles and enemies, and a Lara Croft character skin based on the 2013 Tomb Raider video game. On 2 February, the Twisted Gears downloadable pack was released featuring a tomb, new in-game items, and a Lara Croft character skin based on the original Tomb Raider game.

In March 2020, Square Enix made Temple of Osiris and the 2013 Tomb Raider reboot redeemable for free on Steam for a limited time during the COVID-19 pandemic as part of their "Stay Home and Play" campaign in order to encourage social distancing.

=== The Lara Croft Collection ===
A collection of Temple of Osiris and its predecessor Guardian of Light, The Lara Croft Collection, was released for Nintendo Switch in June 2023, published by Feral Interactive.

== Reception ==
Reception

Aggregate score
| Aggregator | Score |
|---|---|
| Metacritic | PC: 73/100; PS4: 74/100; XONE: 72/100 |

Review scores
| Publication | Score |
|---|---|
| Computer Games Magazine | 8/10 |
| Destructoid | 6/10 |
| Eurogamer | 7/10 |
| Game Informer | 7.75/10 |
| GameRevolution | 5/10 stars |
| GameSpot | 7/10 |
| GamesRadar+ | 4/5 stars |
| Hardcore Gamer | 3.5/5 |
| IGN | 8.1/10 |
| PC Gamer (US) | 79/100 |
| Polygon | 7.5/10 |
| Push Square | 6/10 stars |
| The Guardian | 3/5 stars |
| USgamer | 3.5/5 |
| VideoGamer.com | 7/10 |

Temple of Osiris received "mixed or average" reviews from critics, according to review aggregator Metacritic. During the 18th Annual D.I.C.E. Awards, the Academy of Interactive Arts & Sciences nominated Temple of Osiris for "Outstanding Achievement in Original Music Composition".

Dave Rudden of IGN called the game "almost as essential as Lara's third-person execursions", praising the game's creative level design and multiplayer while criticizing its lack of personality in comparison to previous titles. GamesRadar+ gave the game four stars out of five, praising the chaotic co-op, environmental puzzles, and bosses, while criticizing the game's loading issues and lack of readability during cooperative play. Emanuel Maiberg of PC Gamer called the game "much more fun with a friend" while appreciating its clever puzzles and lamenting the game's short runtime which left little room to capitalize on its mechanics. Christian Donlan of Eurogamer complimented the game's utilization of its fairly simple mechanics in order to mask the lack of "first-rate" quality to any one facet of the game. Ben Reeves of Game Informer called the game "largely a retread of Guardian of Light" and deemed its gameplay "standard" while still finding the game fun to play through with friends. GameSpot called the game's pacing "gratifying" in the way it mixed its shooting, locomotion, and problem-solving, while calling out the dated visuals, unrewarding story, and technical issues. Polygon's Philip Kollar noted that in spite of critical issues such as the game's poor loot system and occasionally bad camera, it proved to be an enjoyable experience nevertheless. Push Square gave the game six stars out of ten and lamented the game's lack of personality and memorability while praising its graphics, bosses, and short loading times.
