= Cyberpunk (disambiguation) =

Cyberpunk is a literary subgenre of science fiction.

Cyberpunk may also refer to:

- "Cyberpunk" (short story), a 1983 short story by Bruce Bethke that coined the term "cyberpunk"
- Cyberpunk (role-playing game), a 1988 tabletop game written by Mike Pondsmith
  - Cyberpunk (collectible card game), based on the role-playing game
  - Cyberpunk 2077, a 2020 role-playing video game developed by CD Projekt Red, based on the role-playing game by Mike Pondsmith
  - Cyberpunk: Edgerunners, a 2022 anime series based on the video game Cyberpunk 2077
- GURPS Cyberpunk, a 1990 genre toolkit for role-playing games
- Cyberpunk: Outlaws and Hackers on the Computer Frontier – 1991 nonfiction book by Katie Hafner and John Markoff
- Cyberpunk (album), a 1993 album by Billy Idol
- Cyberpunks (video game), a 1993 shooter game for the Amiga computer

== See also ==
- Cybergoth, a fashion and music subculture
- Cyberpunx, a comic book series
- Cypherpunk, a type of social activist
