= Monty Python's Flying Circus (disambiguation) =

Monty Python's Flying Circus is a British comedy sketch television series originally broadcast by the BBC between 1969 and 1974.

Monty Python's Flying Circus may also refer to:

- Monty Python's Flying Circus (album), a 1970 comedy album
- Monty Python's Flying Circus: The Computer Game (also known as Monty Python's Flying Circus), a 1990 computer game
