= Chuck Rock =

1991 video game

- European Mega Drive box art
- Developer: Core Design (Note: Commodore 64 and Game Boy versions developed by Genias and Spidersoft.)
- Publisher: Core Design: Amiga, C64, CD32 Core Design Archimedes Krisalis Software Super NES, Mega-CD/Sega CD, Game Boy Sony Imagesoft Game Gear Sega Mega Drive/Genesis, Master System Virgin Games
- Designer: Robert Churchill
- Programmer: Chris Long
- Artist: Lee Pullen
- Composer: Matthew Simmonds
- Platform: List: Amiga, Atari ST, Acorn Archimedes, Game Gear, Mega Drive/Genesis, Super NES, Game Boy, Commodore 64, Master System, Mega-CD/Sega CD, Amiga CD32
- Release: 1991: Amiga, Atari ST, Archimedes; EU: 27 April 1991 Mega Drive/Genesis; NA: January 1992; EU: August 1992 Master System; EU: August 1992 Game Gear; NA: September 1992; EU: 15 October 1992 Super NES; NA: November 1992; PAL: 1992 C64; 1992 Mega-CD/Sega CD; NA: 1992; EU: July 1993 Game Boy; NA: December 1993; EU: 1993 CD32; EU: 1994
- Genre: Platform
- Mode: Single-player

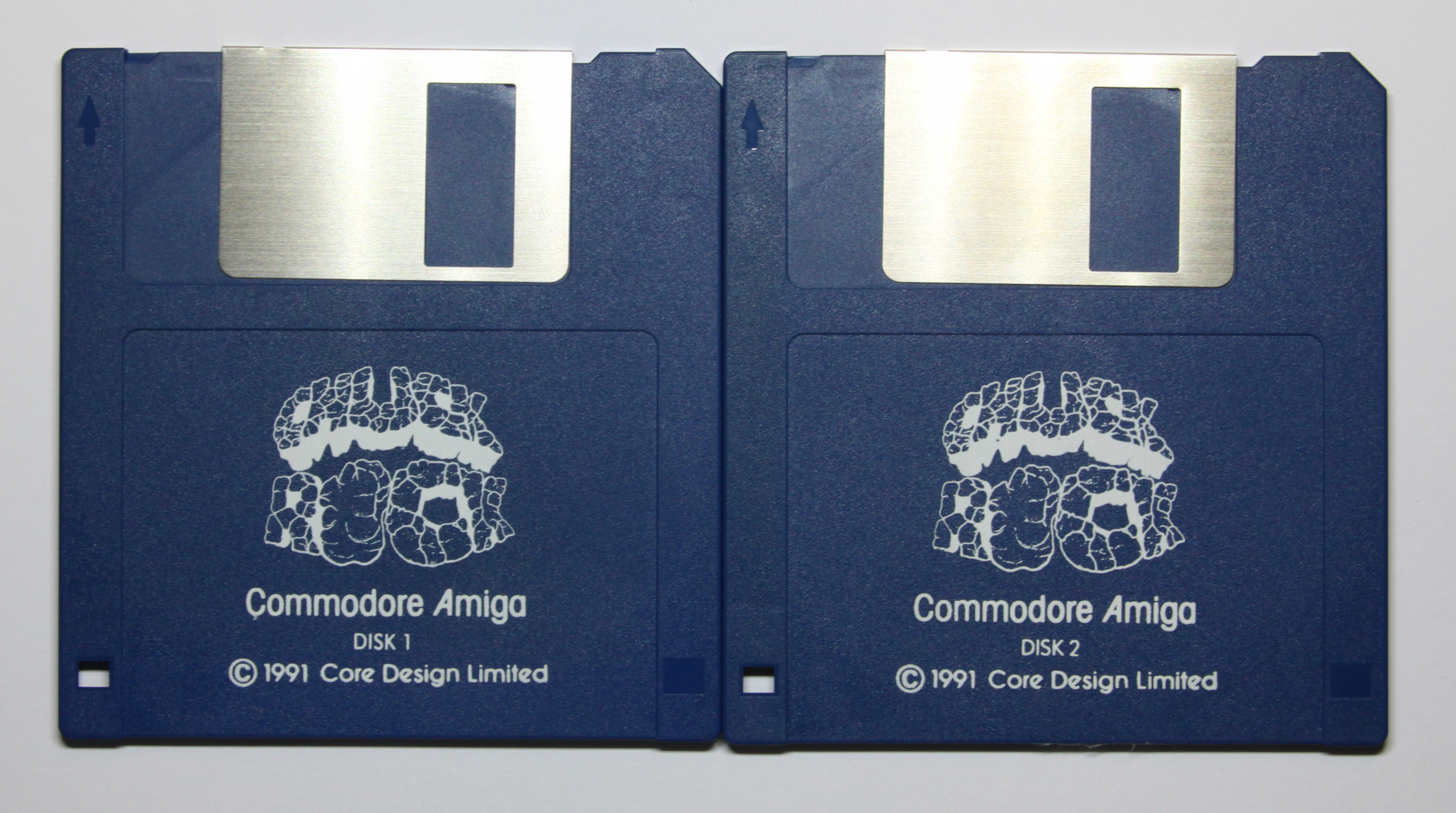
Amiga version floppy disks

Chuck Rock is a 1991 platform video game developed and published by Core Design for the Atari ST and Amiga computers. A Commodore 64 port followed in 1992 and an Amiga CD32 version in 1994. The game was subsequently published by Krisalis Software for the Acorn Archimedes. Virgin Interactive published the game for the Mega Drive/Genesis, Master System, and the Game Gear. Sony Imagesoft published the game for the Mega-CD, Super NES, and Game Boy.

The character of Chuck Rock was an early mascot for Core Design before the introduction of Lara Croft in the 1996 game Tomb Raider, and Chuck Rock and his family even featured in some UK comic books of the 1990s. Chuck Rock was followed by the sequel Chuck Rock II: Son of Chuck in 1993 and the spin-off BC Racers in 1994.

== Plot ==
The setting of the game is a fictional prehistorical Stone Age-era world that is shared by both neanderthals, woolly mammoth, saber-tooth tigers, dinosaurs, and various assorted wild primeval monsters such as prehistoric mammals, giant insects, human-eating plants, and other exotica; thus, the setting is similar to that of films such as One Million Years B.C., or television shows such as The Flintstones or Dinosaurs.

The eponymous Chuck Rock is an overweight, square-jawed caveman characterized by loutish and lewd behaviour perhaps influenced by the lad culture of the 1990s. Chuck has a limited vocabulary (his favourite phrase being "Unga Bunga" and not much else), has a balding head cut into a punk-style mohawk, eats whole dinosaur-steaks raw in one bite, and has a penchant for picking up rocks and throwing them at things, hence his name. Chuck is a guitarist and singer (or shouter) in a rock band along with some other cavemen, his attractive wife Ophelia Rock, and a long-haired dinosaur bass player; and whilst on stage he wears a long wig to hide his balding head.

One day, while Chuck watches TV, Ophelia Rock does the laundry. She is knocked unconscious and kidnapped by jealous local bully Garry Gritter (a pun on the name of pop star Gary Glitter), and carried off to Gritter's hang-out in the creepy dinosaur graveyard. Chuck must go to her rescue, searching for her in primeval jungles, swamps, lakes, an ice-capped mountain top, caves, and even the insides of a gigantic dinosaur.

== Gameplay ==
Chuck Rock is a side-scrolling action-adventure puzzle platformer where the player, as the eponymous caveman, rescues his love interest, Ophelia, who is held hostage in a jungle by Gary Gritter. The game has five worlds (Jungle, Cave, Water, Ice and Graveyard) each with three to five levels and a concluding boss battle, and provides the player three lives and one continue. Parallax scrolling is present in all versions except the Atari ST. The enemies include dinosaurs (such as small ones that pop out of eggs) and spiders, and Chuck attacks them by thrusting his beer belly, kicking while above ground, and chucking rocks and boulders. Additionally, rocks can shield Chuck from hazards that fall from the top, and boulders can be used as platforms, which is occasionally necessary to obtain certain bonus items. Some animals aid in Chuck's journey, such as flying lizards that he eats, a brontosaurus that he rides, and a crocodile that serves as a seesaw for him to bounce over a wall.

== Development ==
Development of Chuck Rock began in mid-October 1990 when graphic artist Lee Pullen drew a Neanderthal character in OCP Art Studio on his Atari ST. The game was designed around the character by Robert Churchill, with the prehistorical themes inspired by Bonk's Adventure, and programmed by Chris Long, who gave the character the name "Chuck Rock". Pullen watched the Tom and Jerry cartoons in order to "get the right feel and balance" of the game's slapstick humour. The music, sound effects and voices were composed and designed by Matthew Simmonds.

The Archimedes version was programmed by programmed by Andrew Ware and Shaun Hollingworth at Krisalis Software Ltd. The Commodore 64 version was programmed by Luca Zarri and Marco Corazza at Genias, with graphics by Marco Corazza and Andrea Paselli, and music and sound effects by Paolo Predonzani. During development, Core Design believed that the market for the Commodore 64 was dwindling at the time, and decided to cancel the game. Genias completed the game and had it released only in Italy. The Game Boy version was programmed by Darren Clayton and tested by Kevin Howe at Spidersoft.

The music and sound effects in the Sega Genesis, Game Gear and Master System versions were composed by Matt Furniss at Krisalis Software Ltd. The music and sound effects in the Mega-CD version were composed by Martin Iveson.

== Reception ==
Reception

Review scores
Publication	Score
AllGame	2.5/5 (GG)
Computer and Video Games	83/100
Electronic Gaming Monthly	31/40 (SMD)
Games-X	5/5 (ST)
Mean Machines Sega	91% (SMD)
Total!	50% (GB)
Play Time	77% (SMD)
Sega Master Force	91%
Zzap!64	96% (C64)

Award
Publication	Award
Zzap!64	Gold Medal

Computer and Video Games (CVG) reported that Chuck Rock was one of the most popular home computer games upon release. Writing for Mean Machines, Julian called Chuck Rock the best platform game of 1992, Rich the best since James Pond 2: Codename RoboCod (1991). Steve of Electronic Gaming Monthly (EGM) called it one of the best action-adventure video games since Sonic the Hedgehog (1991) for its new elements to the genre.

Play Time writer Ray named Chuck Rock one of the funniest mascots to compete with Sonic. Writers of EGM praised its successful combination of humorous elements and "heavy gameplay", Steve arguing Kato and Ken (1990) was the only other game he played that had it. The graphics were frequently acclaimed, called excellent, exceptional, and superb. Ray and the EGM writers spotlighted the humorous animations, Martin noting Chuck's standing animation and Ray the enemies, who he described as "lovely drawn". Julian of Mean Machines described the environments as beautifully-drawn. Ray labeled the graphics a primary motivator for playing the game. EGM's Ed claimed the Sega Genesis could have used more upbeat titles like Chuck Rock.

Games-X called the gameplay exceptional and recommended it to fans of Rick Dangerous (1989). Paul Glancey of CVG called Chuck Rock Core Design's best platformer so far, if simple and unoriginal. The gameplay was praised as addictive, encouraging hours of play. The difficulty curve and potentially long play time was also praised. Julian, who usually hated combinations of platform and puzzle, wrote Chuck Rock successfully combined the genres, reasoning the puzzles were "logical and enjoyable" and did not interfere with the action.

Martin and Ray suggested minor gameplay tweaking; Ray criticized the platforms that Chuck can jump from below to while also being vulnerable to going through when jumping. Glancey also advised more diversions to the experience, such as "a few extra weapons".

The game's humorous sound effects were a frequent highlight. Glancey felt it and the cartoon graphics made Chuck Rock good source material for a cartoon show. Mean Machines highlighted the sound effects, especially those themed to the Stone Age a la The Flintstones (1960–1966). EGM and Mean Machines also admitted to grooving along to the music.

The Genesis port was well-received by critics of EGM for its transition of the graphics from one console to another, Mean Machines its faster performance, larger screen and smooth frame rate. James of Total!, reviewing the Game Boy version, was critical of the collision detection and slow movement of the player character, and found the environments dull.

== Legacy ==
A direct sequel came in 1993 in the form of Chuck Rock II: Son of Chuck, which was also ported to several consoles like its predecessor. Chuck Rock II: Son of Chuck was more aimed at a younger audience than its predecessor, and the player character was not actually Chuck Rock himself but his infant son, Chuck Junior. It was not as well received by fans. Nonetheless around the time of the game's release, Core commissioned a comic strip in the long-running UK children's magazine Look-in, centering on the day-to-day lives of Chuck, Ophelia and Junior. As a meta-referential joke, Chuck Junior owned a "SteggaDrive" console, a reference to the Mega Drive name. A year later, the magazine was closed (after almost 25 years), and the final strip saw Chuck being swept away from his boat, presumed dead but washing up on a tribal island and being revered as god – as an inexplicable comic touch, mourners at his "funeral" included then-Prime-Minister John Major.

A spin-off to Chuck Rock came in the game BC Racers, released later in the same year as Chuck Rock II: Son of Chuck. BC Racers was released on the Mega-CD, Sega 32X and 3DO, and the format was changed from that of a platformer to that of a racing game. The game was designed by Toby Gard, who later created Lara Croft. BC Racers retained the characters of Chuck Rock as well as his son Chuck Junior. Other prehistoric racers include Millstone Rockafella, Brick Jagger and Jimi Handtrix. The game was generally well received among the fans of the consoles in question.
