= Simon Phipps (game designer) =

British video game designer (born 1966)

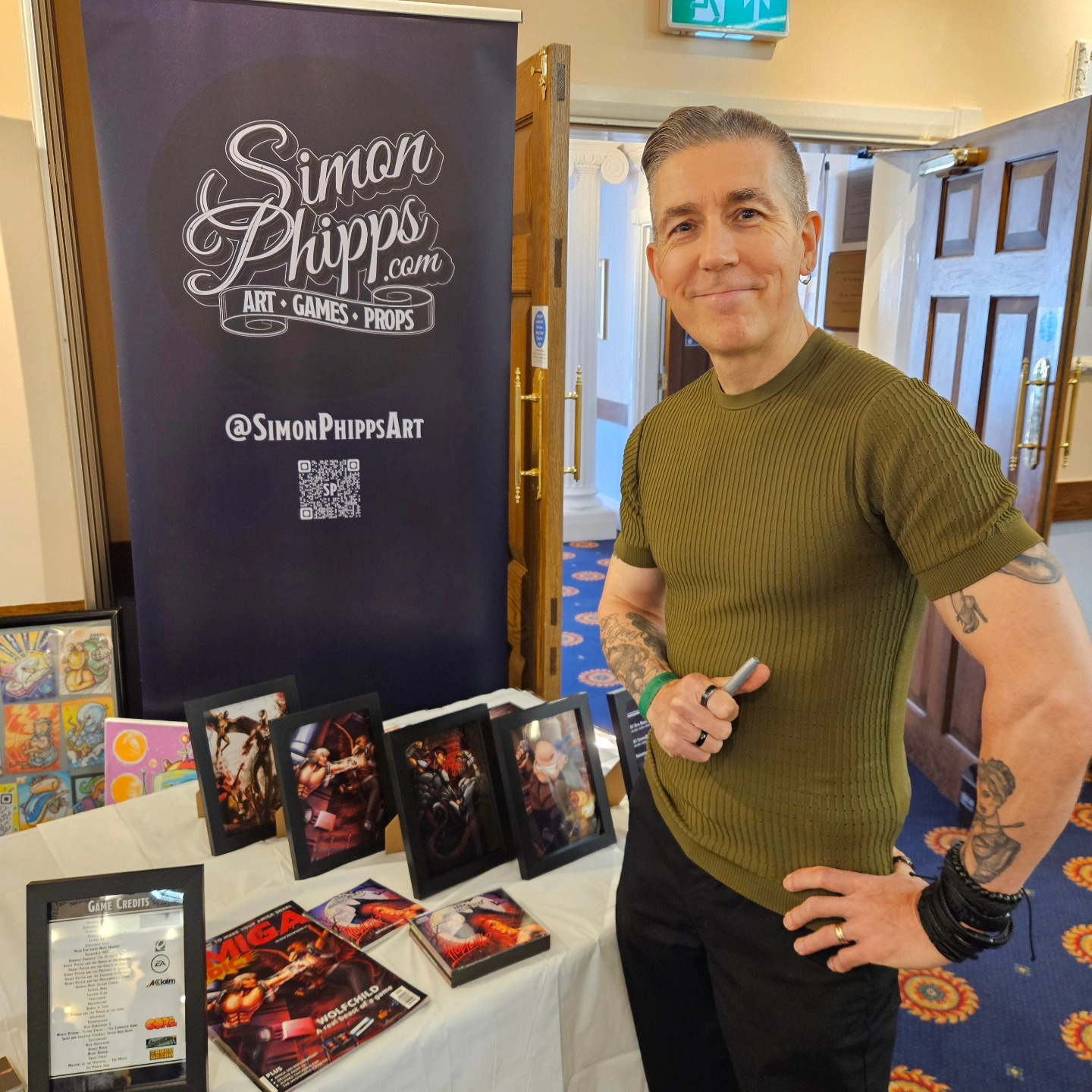
- Phipps at NottsVGE 2024
- Born: 1966 (age 59–60); England
- Occupation: Video game designer

Simon Phipps is a British self-taught game programmer and video game designer. He began making games in 1982 when he wrote his first published video game, StarForce Lander (a version of Lunar Lander) he wrote while he was at school. He spent a few months writing business software before he was approached to provide some freelance artwork for Sheffield-based Gremlin Graphics. At his interview, he was offered a full-time position.

In 1988, he was one of the founders of Core Design, where he would work on many of their titles until leaving in 1996.

Phipps then worked on Acclaim Entertainment's hit Shadow Man, alongside game designer Guy Miller. Phipps worked for Acclaim Teesside, but about 9 months into making the game ShadowMan: 2econd Coming, he left for Electronic Arts (EA) where he worked alongside Guy Miller on the Harry Potter games for five years.

In 2006, he moved to EA's studio Criterion Games working on a number of unpublished titles as well as contributing to their website and video podcast. In early 2009 he left EA and joined Eurocom.

Simon has been a regular guest of the Nottingham Video Games Expo (NottsVGE) which was established in 2022 and has so far been held across two different venues across Nottingham.

In 2024, Simon was part of the Nottingham Video Games Expo on the 20th and 21 July, which was held at The Belgrave Rooms. Simon exhibited unique game design art, plus delivered a talk across the weekend of the expo about his work in the gaming industry. Over previous years, Simon has been part of the Nottingham Video Game Expo delivering talks and Q&A.

== Games ==
- Jet Power Jack
- Masters of the Universe: the Movie
- Skate Crazy
- Night Raider
- Rick Dangerous
- Switchblade
- Saint and Greavsie's Football Trivia
- Monty Python's Flying Circus: The Computer Game
- Rick Dangerous 2
- Thunderhawk
- Wolfchild
- Asterix and the Power of the Gods
- Bubba 'n' Stix
- Shellshock
- College Slam
- ShadowMan
- ShadowMan: 2econd Coming
- Harry Potter and the Philosopher's Stone
- Harry Potter and the Chamber of Secrets
- Harry Potter and the Prisoner of Azkaban
- Harry Potter and the Goblet of Fire
- Harry Potter and the Order of the Phoenix
