= Nippon Safes Inc. =

1992 video game

- Developer(s): Dynabyte
- Publisher(s): Dynabyte; Global Software
- Platform(s): MS-DOS, Amiga
- Release: 1992
- Genre(s): Adventure
- Mode(s): Single-player

Nippon Safes Inc. is a point-and-click adventure game developed by Italian developer Dynabyte. It was released in 1992 for MS-DOS and Amiga computers. The game is the predecessor to The Big Red Adventure and features cartoonish, comics-style graphics and a unique icon-based interface. In 2021 the game was declared freeware by the original authors of the game.

== Gameplay ==
The player controls three heroes: Doug, a smart safe-cracker; Dino, a strong but stupid boxer; and Donna, a sexy club dancer. Players can choose to play as any of these characters or all three, as each character has their own story to follow and puzzles to solve. The stories of the three characters intersect at certain points, but players can also choose to focus on just one character if they prefer.

== Reception ==
Reception

Review scores
Publication	Score
Amiga Power	85%
CU Amiga	86%
The One Amiga	83%

Overall, Nippon Safes Inc. received positive reviews for its humorous writing, clever puzzles, and innovative use of the Parallaction system. Amiga Power compared the game to Curse of Enchantia and Monkey Island and thought the game difficulty was optimal.
