= Shellshock (video game) =

1996 video game

- North American Saturn cover art
- Developer: Core Design
- Publishers: Saturn: NA: U.S. Gold; EU: CentreGold; PlayStation: NA: U.S. Gold; EU: Core Design; DOS: NA: Eidos Interactive; EU: Core Design
- Producers: Jeremy Heath-Smith; Mike Schmitt
- Designer: Simon Phipps
- Programmer: Mansoor Nusrat
- Writer: Guy Miller
- Composer: Martin Iveson
- Platforms: MS-DOS, PlayStation, Sega Saturn
- Release: Saturn: EU: 19 April 1996; NA: 14 June 1996; PlayStation: EU: 19 April 1996; NA: 30 June 1996; DOS: EU: 19 April 1996; NA: 26 July 1996
- Genres: Combat simulation, first-person shooter, vehicular combat
- Modes: Single-player, multiplayer (Note: Only available on MS-DOS and up to eight players via online)

Shellshock is a video game developed by Core Design and published by U.S. Gold for Sega Saturn, PlayStation and MS-DOS, first released in 1996.

== Gameplay ==
Shellshock is a near-future game in which the player character is a new recruit as part of a tank commando corps that work as mercenaries.

== Release ==
A 3DO Interactive Multiplayer version was announced to be in development but it never released.

== Reception ==
Reception

Review scores
Publication	Score
AllGame	3/5 (PC)
Computer Gaming World	3/5 (PC)
Next Generation	4/5 (PS1); 3/5 (SAT); 2/5 (PC)

Next Generation reviewed the PlayStation version of the game, rating it four stars out of five, and stated that "for those with the determination and patience, Shellshock has its rewards."

Next Generation reviewed the Saturn version of the game, rating it three stars out of five, and stated that "Combine the simplistic but entertaining gameplay with 25 extremely challenging levels and there is plenty here for the gamer who doesn't mind foregoing a little realism for fun."

Next Generation reviewed the PC version of the game, rating it two stars out of five, and stated that "on the pure action level, this might whet some appetites. It's not a hit, but it might be enough to entertain you as long as it's purchased in the ever-helpful bargain bin."

Mark Clarkson from Computer Gaming World gave the game 3 stars out 5, saying while "Shellshock doesn't set any new standards, it is fun and loud. Your M-13 rips through chain-link fences and snaps street lights like twigs, all while thumping music blares in the background. And best of all, in a LAN-based multiplayer game you can hurl both shells and taunts a your real-life homies."
