= Bubble and Squeak (video game) =

1994 video game

- Developer(s): Audiogenic Software
- Publisher(s): Sunsoft; Audiogenic Software
- Producer(s): Peter Calver
- Designer(s): Pat Fox; Scott Williams
- Composer(s): Allister Brimble (Amiga, CD32); Matt Furniss (Genesis)
- Platform(s): Amiga, Genesis, CD32
- Release: NA: March 1994; EU: January 1995
- Genre(s): Platform
- Mode(s): Single-player

Bubble and Squeak is a platform game published for the Amiga in 1994 by Audiogenic Software. It was developed by Fox Williams under the name Barney & Clyde, and they ported it to the Sega Genesis for which it was published by Sunsoft under license from Audiogenic. The game is a childlike sci-fi fantasy platform game in which players control a little human boy named Bubble along with recent alien acquaintance Squeak. The platform levels are separated by brief underwater scrolling shooter bonus segments.

== Plot ==
The story takes place on the planet Grool, a planet inhabited by mostly short, anthropomorphous felines. The idyllic and mundane lifestyle of the feline aliens is interrupted when an alien invader known as Kat of Nine Tails kidnaps Grool's sentient populace, inadvertently leaving one of them, Squeak, behind. Shortly after, Squeak encounters a human boy known only as Bubble who agrees to rescue Grool's captured populace.

== Gameplay ==
Players control Bubble and at any time during gameplay they can command Squeak to either 'follow' or 'wait' for him. Squeak, who is invulnerable to enemies and enemy fire, has own AI and can help collect items or give Bubble a boost via piggy-back, toss him up to tall heights or serve as a platform for him to stand on. Collectable items include gems, coins, and a submersible icon which is necessary to play the shooter stages; some items can be picked up and carried to other locations such as springs, but the only items the player can pick up in the shooter stages were extra lives and Speed-ups. In both modes of gameplay (collecting and shooting), Bubble is equipped with unlimited ammunition, either stars or torpedoes.

== Reception ==
Electronic Gaming Monthly gave the Genesis version a 6.6 out of 10, praising the use of teamwork and strategy and the impressive graphics.

== See also ==
- Bubba 'n' Stix, a similar game released the same year
