= BC Racers =

1994 video game

- North American Sega CD box art
- Developer: Core Design
- Publishers: Sega CD; Core Design; 32X, MS-DOS; Front Street Publishing; 3DO; GoldStar; LG Electronics
- Designer: Martin Gibbons
- Series: Chuck Rock
- Platforms: Sega CD, 32X, MS-DOS, 3DO
- Release: Sega CD: EU: December 1994; NA: February 1995; 32X: NA: June 1995; 3DO, MS-DOS: UK: 1995
- Genre: Racing
- Modes: Single-player, multiplayer

BC Racers is a 1994 racing video game released by Core Design for the Sega CD, 32X, 3DO and MS-DOS. The game was co-designed by Toby Gard, who later co-created Lara Croft. BC Racers mixes a racing simulation with a "prehistoric" theme. It is the third game in the Chuck Rock series, despite the Chuck Rock connection not being prominent.

== Plot ==
The millionaire playboy caveman Millstone Rockafella has organized a BC bike race, the winner of which will receive the Ultimate Boulderdash Bike. Six groups of riders - one driving, one deploying weapons from the sidecar - from all around the prehistoric world will use their rock-powered sidecars to compete for this prize.

== Gameplay ==
BC Racers has four difficulty settings: Easy, Medium, Hard and Rockhard. Each of the settings has eight different circuits, making a total of 32 circuits in the game. There are also eight themes, from desert wastes to active volcanoes and massive jungles. The tracks need four laps to complete, and feature many special elements specific to the circuit's setting. Unusually for a game of this type, there are no power-ups, except for a "turbo" that the bikes can trigger every few seconds.

Both of the bikes' riders can use physical attacks to injure other drivers. If the bike gets beaten enough, it crashes out, giving the player extra points. The same thing can happen to the player's bike.

Some ports of the game include a split-screen two player mode. The Sega CD version instead has a two-player cooperative mode (one of the players controls the driver, while the other controls the fighting, steering and turbo).

Some of the riders in BC Racers come from other famous Core Design games, such as Chuck Rock and Chuck Rock Junior. Others are obvious references to several real-world characters, such as Brick Jagger, Sid Viscous and Jimi Handtrix (referencing Mick Jagger, Sid Vicious and Jimi Hendrix).

== Development ==
Jeremy Smith of Core Design said the original Sega CD version took "eight or nine months" to develop. Its working title was "Chuck Rally".

== Reception ==
Reviewing the Sega CD version, GamePro criticized the pixelated landscapes, minimal sound effects, and difficult controls when using a three-button controller, but praised the comical graphics and "lightweight" tone, and recommended it as a decent title for younger gamers. Digital Press gave the Sega CD version 7 out of 10, praising the controls and music, but they criticized the graphics.

In their review of the 32X version, GamePro commented that the graphics are sharper than in the Sega CD version, but look much worse during actual gameplay due to the choppy frame rate and prominent slowdown, especially during two-player mode. They nonetheless concluded that BC Racers will appeal to the gamers due to its numerous tracks, humorous attacks, and simultaneous two-player action.

Next Generation reviewed the PC version of the game and gave it two out of five stars, deeming it inferior to another kart title Super Karts.

Reviewing the 3DO version, a Next Generation critic rated it as the worst racing game on the 3DO to date, citing the lack of depth to the car handling, the ugly-looking courses, and overall outdated feel of the game. He gave it one out of five stars.
