= Darkmere =

1994 video game

Darkmere: The Nightmare's Begun
- Developer(s): Zero Hour Software
- Publisher(s): Core Design
- Producer(s): Jeremy Heath-Smith
- Designer(s): Mark K. Jones
- Programmer(s): Paul A. Hodgson; Andrew J. Buchanan; Stewart Gilray
- Artist(s): Mark K. Jones; Richard Fox
- Composer(s): Martin Iveson
- Platform(s): Amiga
- Release: 1994
- Genre(s): Action-adventure
- Mode(s): Single player

Darkmere: The Nightmare's Begun is an action-adventure game developed by Zero Hour Software and published by Core Design in 1994. Darkmere was first being developed by Arcane Developments, but due to repeated delays and the project becoming too ambitious, development was moved in-house at Core Design and the code was "virtually rewritten from scratch." Core Design went on to publish a sequel to Darkmere that same year called Dragonstone, on Amiga(A500/A600/A1200/A4000) and Amiga CD32, which failed to match the critical approval of its predecessor.

== Plot ==
Long ago the great dragon Enywas killed villagers and burned down their farms every night. One day an elf named Gildorn left his people to slaughter the dragon with an enchanted sword crafted by the mage Malthar. After his difficult encounter, Gildorn was made king of the village and found himself a wife Berengaria. Gildorn's happiness was short lived. One day his wife left and all he found in his search was a child she had given birth to and Gildorn named him Ebyrn. Gildorn had been neglecting his duties to protect the kingdom in search of his lost wife. As a result, the kingdom suffered a fate worse than the Enywas' attack. A plague of orcs, brigands and dragons swarmed the kingdom followed by a cloud of darkness called the "Darkmere". Villagers were now constantly killed or taken away and no one was safe wherever they went. Finally in his dying days, Gildorn entrusts Prince Ebryn with his old enchanted sword and an elven crystal and requests him to seek help from Malthar then find and destroy the source of this evil.

== Gameplay ==
The player takes the role of Prince Ebryn. The game is divided into three locations which is the unnamed village, the forests beyond and the dark caverns. Progressing through the locations requires the player to solve quests and tasks. The player can move in four directions through multiple roads, paths and rooms. The player can interact with objects and perform actions with menus for picking up items, identifying items, examining, talking to people and using items. The protagonist's elven sword glows when orcs are near, a reference to an elven sword with the same trait in The Lord of the Rings, Sting. If the player kills innocent people, their sword hurts the player. In combat the player needs to time slash attacks with the sword to kill enemies and avoid taking damage. If all Ebryn's health is lost, the game is over.

More conversation topics in dialogue become available as the player explores, or from conversation, as 'key words' in character's responses are added to available topics in dialogue.

== Development ==
Mark Jones had come up with the idea of Darkmere since he worked at Ocean Software and was keen on isometric perspective games. In his spare time, he designed the main character Prince Ebryn. He wasn't able to find a company to help work on his concept. Arcane Design agreed to find a suitable publisher after he signed the rights of his idea to them and soon Core Design agreed to take on the project.

The game began development in February 1992 with plans to be released by October. However the game was delayed several times before release in 1994. Core Design called Darkmere's release "very late indeed", with Core's managing director Jeremy Smith explaining that "[Darkmere] was started by one programmer who managed to get about 40% of the main code written before realising that the original design was way too ambitious for the hardware he was using. So after a few 'staff changes' we took the project in-house and virtually rewrote it from scratch." Smith purports that "[Darkmere] is a game which achieves 90% of what we initially expected. It's still a massive game but its delay is perhaps due to naiveness and bad management on our part." Time restrictions were imposed on Darkmere's development, and in a 1992 interview prior to a developer change and subsequent re-writing of the game, Darkmere designer Mark Jones stated that despite the time restrictions, "[Darkmere] has all turned out exactly as I'd planned it, although I would have originally liked longer to develop the game. I don't think that the time restrictions placed on us have meant that there is anything we have purposely omitted, there's just a few extra things that we haven't been able to add - nothing important that will detract from the way the game actually plays, though."

The One interviewed Mark Jones, Darkmere's designer, for information regarding its development in a pre-release interview prior to Arcane Developments' dismissal from the project in 1992. According to this interview, Darkmere's concept was "floating around for a couple of years" before its development. Jones cited The Hobbit as an inspiration for Darkmere, further exemplified by one of the taverns being named the "Tolk Inn" and the protagonist's sword glowing in the presence of orcs, similar to Sting. Darkmere's puzzlesolving and gameplay was designed to be more "interactive" according to Jones, who explains that "Darkmere can be played in two ways, with the emphasis either on traditional adventuring or combat ... missions often don't turn out to be straightforward and it is this mesh of sub-plots that will make Darkmere a joy to play. What we've tried to do is make sure that every puzzle is solvable in two ways or in a combination of two styles." Jones criticized dice-roll mechanics in RPGs, and stated that ''Darkmere relies on proper fighting moves. The energy of both characters involved are [displayed] so you can decide whether it's worth taking the risk and fighting or accepting the easy way out and running for it".

Arcane Developments, Darkmere's former developer, stated that sound is an 'often overlooked aspect of games', and as a result Darkmere was at the time stated to have 100 kilobytes of sampled sound in each level. Digitized speech was planned, but Jones expressed that "there was just no memory left for speech", but stated that Darkmere's sound effects "should spook the player and really draw them into the game and, coupled with the actual gameplay, make it far more realistic than similar games we've seen." Arcane Developments described Darkmere as the game "Cadaver wasn't". Steve Iles, Darkmere's producer, stated that Darkmere is more involved than Cadaver, being more "visually exciting", and having more interaction with characters and more combat-based action.

== Reception ==
The One gave Darkmere an overall score of 82%, praising the "atmospheric" sound effects' volume depending on the player's distance to the source of the sound, as well as the art style, saying "[Darkmere] oozes style and the quest is large enough to keep even the most experienced adventurer occupied for several weeks ... if you're even moderately interested in adventuring then you can't do much better." The One criticized the map design, expressing a desire for it to be "more structured", furthermore stating "you're likely to spend hours wandering around trying to fathom out where to go next and because everything is so spread out it's easy to become hopelessly lost", as well as the inventory UI, which they referred to as "frustrating to use."

== Reviews ==
- Amiga Dream / Dream / Login
- Génération 4
- Joystick (French)
- Amiga Games
- Pelit
- Amiga Joker
- Amiga Format
- Amiga Computing
- CU Amiga
- Power Play
- Amiga Power
- The Good Old Days
