= Wolfchild =

1992 video game

- Cover art
- Developer: Core Design
- Publishers: Core Design; Virgin Games (GG, MS, SNES); JVC Musical Industries (MCD, Gen)
- Director: Jeremy Heath-Smith
- Producer: Ian Mathias
- Designer: Simon Phipps
- Programmers: John Kirkland (68000), Alex Davis (65816), Sean Dunlevy (Z80)
- Artist: Simon Phipps
- Composer: Martin Iveson
- Platforms: Amiga, Atari ST, Sega CD, Sega Genesis, Game Gear, Master System, SNES
- Release: 1992
- Genre: Platform game
- Mode: Single-player

Wolfchild is a platform game originally released for the Amiga and the Atari ST by Core Design in 1992. It was later released for the SNES, Mega Drive/Genesis, Sega CD, Master System, and Game Gear.

The plot revolves around biotechnology researcher Kal Morrow and his son Saul. When Kal is kidnapped by the evil Chimera organization, Saul uses one of his father's inventions to turn himself into a wolf-human hybrid (similar to a werewolf) that may be capable of defeating Chimera.

Wolfchild was designed by Simon Phipps, also responsible for the earlier Switchblade 2, a rather similar game. The action is viewed from the side and scrolls in eight directions. The player must guide Saul through five levels, negotiating platforms and shooting various monsters, the result of Chimera experiments. Initially, the player character is Saul in his normal, human form. Only when enough energy has been collected does he turn into a wolf-human, giving him much better attack techniques.

== Reception ==
Reception

Review scores
Publication	Score
AllGame	SNES: 2.5/5
Electronic Gaming Monthly	SNES: 5/10; GEN: 5.25/10
Mega	32%
ACE	905/1000

Gary Whitta of ACE magazine gave the Amiga version a score of 905 (out of a possible 1000), praising its animation, speed and responsiveness, and generally deeming it executed better than Switchblade 2. Mega said that the Sega CD version was overpriced and did not make use of the hardware. Electronic Gaming Monthly gave the SNES version a 5 out of 10, complimenting the graphics and sound effects, but found gameplay as dull and unappealing. They gave the Genesis version a 5.25 out of 10, saying it was identical to the earlier Sega CD version aside from the CD music, and that the game was overlong with repetitive gameplay which quickly becomes dull.
