= Dragonstone (video game) =

1994 video game

- Developer: Core Design
- Publisher: Core Design
- Producer: Jeremy Heath-Smith
- Designers: Robert Churchill; Barry Irvine; Mark K. Jones; Simon Phipps
- Programmer: Barry Irvine
- Artists: Mark K. Jones; Simon Phipps
- Composer: Martin Iveson
- Platforms: Amiga; Amiga CD32
- Release: 1994 (ECS/OCS); 1995 (CD32)
- Genre: Role-playing
- Mode: Single-player

Dragonstone is a fantasy action role-playing game developed and published by Core Design for the Amiga in 1994 and Amiga CD32 in 1995. It was planned as a sequel to the Amiga game Darkmere, but became a standalone game over the course of development, possibly in part due to Darkmere's repeated delays.

== Plot ==
An unnamed hero travels across seven worlds to kill dragons, rescue Princess Kirstie and restore the ultimate power to the dragonstones to vanquish the dragon hordes.

== Development ==
Dragonstone began development in August 1993, and was developed in a year. Dragonstone was originally designed as a sequel to Darkmere, but over the course of its development became a standalone game. The One reports a rumor as to the reason behind this change; they purport that this may have been due to Darkmere's numerous delays, and Core Design possibly believed that Dragonstone may release before Darkmere. The One interviewed Bob Churchill, Dragonstone's map designer, for information regarding its development in a pre-release interview. Churchill states that Dragonstone began because "The Darkmere programmers took forever and Mark Jones, the graphic artist, was left with nothing to do. So he started knocking up plans for a sequel - Darkstone, as it was then called ... However, the story has changed so much through development that it's become an entirely self-contained game." Dragonstone was inspired by Zelda games, and Churchill states that he "[loves] the Zelda games to bits", and goes on to say that "There are many reasons why they're brilliant but the most obvious is that they play so nicely. The traps and puzzles are so well designed - in most cases you can see exactly what you need to do but it's the doing it which presents the problem. We wanted to do a Zelda-type game on the Amiga, because no-one has ever attempted one before." Furthermore comparing Dragonstone to Zelda, Churchill states that "the two games are pretty close. There is plenty of wandering around and interacting with people, which is very Zelda-ish. The puzzles are similar as well - the in-game characters will request a specific object so that they can complete a task, so it's your job to retrieve it for them, thus opening up more areas to explore."

A difference that Churchill notes between the two games is that Dragonstone has characters that "move around of their own free will" regardless of the player's involvement, posing an example of a woodcutter in a forest who chops down trees, saying that "You'll keep bumping into him and you'll discover new areas which he's cleared, enabling you to explore parts of the level which were previously out of reach." In regards to Dragonstone's puzzles, Churchill expresses that designing them is difficult due to the programming aspect of getting them into the game; stating that "because the puzzles you think up are limited by what you're doing in the actual game - the amount of sprites you can use per level, that kind of thing. You often think: 'I wish we could get this bit in,' but Barry the programmer will say it's not possible." To lessen this issue, Churchill states that several sprites are reused, saying that "Once you've designed a sprite for a specific purpose you'll often ask yourself whether or not it's possible to use that graphic again in another puzzle. That's what I'm doing now for the Castle Level - I've used up the amount of sprites the programmer will allow so it's a case of discovering ways in which I can use them again." Dragonstone's puzzles were designed to be logic-based, and Churchill states that players will "never have to do anything obscure to progress".

The One notes the importance of atmosphere in adventure games, and Churchill expresses several ways Dragonstone is designed to be more immersive, such as sound effects increasing in volume the closer the player is to the source of the sound, and some "smart" graphic effects, such as "an interesting mosaic effect" which occurs when the player teleports. According to Churchill, some parts of Dragonstone were cut so the game could work on the Amiga A500. Mark Jones, Dragonstone's graphic artist, wasn't in-house for Dragonstone's development and Churchill states that "he had to send all the [graphics] up to us by post, which meant that any changes we wanted to make took a lot longer." Churchill states that Mark Jones aimed for a "realistic" art style with Dragonstone's graphics.

== Reception ==
The One gave Dragonstone an overall score of 79%, comparing the game's puzzles to Dizzy, and furthermore stating, "the difficulty level seems to have been aimed at the younger player. There's nothing wrong with that, but at times the game is quite challenging as far as the arcade-ness goes ... while the puzzle solving is just too easy." The One expresses that they find the use of scrolls in the game's puzzles to be a crutch, as the later levels in which they are prevalent are "just boring - you hit the space bar, you solve the problem." The first two levels rely more upon traditional puzzle solving due to the protagonist not yet having the full extent of their powers, a section of the game that The One prefers to the later levels.
