= Blob (video game) =

1993 video game

- Developer: Jonnathan Hilliard
- Publisher: Core Design
- Platform: Amiga
- Release: EU: September 1, 1993
- Genre: Puzzle-platform
- Mode: Single-player

Blob is a puzzle-platform game with more game modes developed by Jonnathan Hilliard and published by Core Design for the Amiga. It was released in the United Kingdom on September 1, 1993.

== Gameplay ==
Blob takes place on tiles floating at different levels in space. The player controls the game's eponymous character, Blob, with the 3D perspective allowing the character to be moved around the tiles at the current level, bounced up to a title at a higher level or dropped down to a lower level. There are 50 worlds in the game, each of which requires either an exit to be found or the collection of items located around it, in order to clear it. Other objectives may need to be completed in order to activate an exit, such as coming into contact with all tiles in a world (similar to the game Q*bert) or rescuing a certain number of creatures known as Blobletts.

There are different types of tile, which have effect on the characters behaviour. These include tiles which bounce Blob higher than usual, that restrict his ability to bounce, that are turned on and off by a switch and tiles covered in ice, that prevent the player from changing the direction of the character until it slides onto a normal tile.

Falling onto a tile from too high causes the character to get hurt, and may damage the tile causing it to crack and eventually break. Blob can also be hurt by aliens, and after a certain amount of damage is sustained, he will lose a life. A life is also lost should Blob fall past the lowest level of tiles in a world.

== Development ==
Development of Blob spanned about a year, from September 1992 until its release in September 1993. Jonnathan Hilliard, the game's lead developer began working on it as he completed his degree course at university. He had worked on 3D systems as part of his university course, and used this knowledge to develop Blob's 3D game engine. Hilliard sent a sample of the game, named at the time "Bouncy Thing", to ten different publishers, in a near-finished state of completion. This resulted in Core Design commissioning the game and hiring Hilliard to work for the company full-time as a developer.

After agreeing to publish the game, Core Design had Billy Allison redesign the graphics, using the Deluxe Paint IV software application, to have more animation in a bid to give the main character more personality. Other changes to the game focused on improving the general presentation and adding more alien characters. The name of the game was also changed during development, firstly to Odd Blob, before a vote held by Core staff decided on Blob as the release title.

== Reception ==
Blob received mixed critical reaction from the Amiga gaming press. Amiga Power provided one of the most positive reviews for the game, describing the game as "brilliantly original" and "maddeningly addictive" and praised its easily graspable gameplay in awarding the game a score of 88%. A positive review was also given by Amiga Format who described Blob as "wonderfully different" and stated that the 3d perspective gave a unique viewpoint which set it apart from other puzzle games. Both The One and Amiga Computing criticised the game's control system, which led to The One criticising the game as being too unforgiving and awarding a score of 67%. CU Amiga magazine questioned the long-term appeal of the game suggesting that the game "starts to become a repetitive chore" but still described it as one of the better games in the puzzle genre released in 1993.
