= Core Design =

Former British video game developer

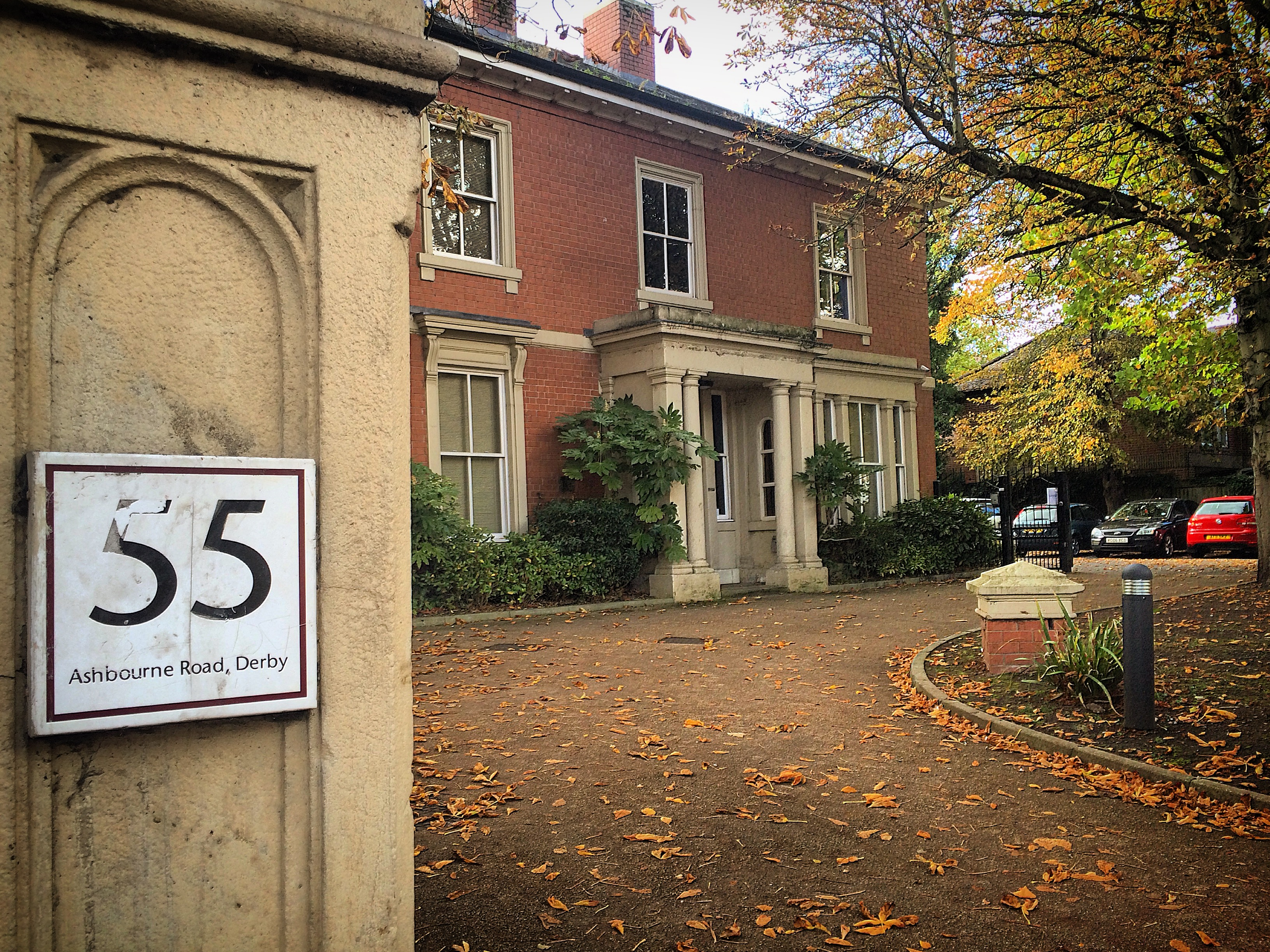
- The entrance of 55 Ashbourne Road in Derby where Core Design was located during the development of the original Tomb Raider
- Formerly: Core Design Limited (1988–2006)
- Type: Subsidiary
- Industry: Video games
- Founded: 13 May 1988; 38 years ago
- Defunct: 17 March 2010
- Fate: Dissolved
- Headquarters: Derby, England
- Products: Rick Dangerous series; Chuck Rock series; Thunderhawk series; Tomb Raider series; Fighting Force series
- Number of employees: 5 (2010)
- Parent: CentreGold (1994–1996); Eidos Interactive (1996–2006); Rebellion Developments (2006–2010)
- Website: core-design.com

Core Design Limited (known as Rebellion (Derby) Ltd between 2006 and 2010) was a British video game developer based in Derby, England. Founded in May 1988 by former Gremlin Graphics employees, it originally bore the name Megabrite until rebranding as Core Design in October the same year.

The company was acquired by CentreGold (the parent of U.S. Gold) in October 1994, which was itself acquired in turn by Eidos Interactive in April 1996.

In May 2006, the Core Design personnel and assets were acquired by Rebellion Developments, and the company became Rebellion Derby, which was then shut down in March 2010.

== History ==
Based in the city of Derby, England, Core Design was founded on 13 May 1988 by Chris Shrigley, Andy Green, Rob Toone, Terry Lloyd, Simon Phipps, Dave Pridmore, Jeremy Heath-Smith, Kevin Norburn and Greg Holmes. Most were former employees of Gremlin Graphics.

The studio was taken over by CentreGold (the parent company of U.S. Gold) in October 1994, with CentreGold itself being acquired by Eidos Interactive in 1996.

Heath-Smith regarded the acquisition as a relief, commenting, "The funding of development is so expensive that I doubt we could have continued to fund ourselves as an independent company." Eidos subsequently sold most of CentreGold, but retained U.S. Gold, the owners of Core Design.

The company is widely known for the Tomb Raider series. The first game was created by Toby Gard and Paul Douglas, released in 1996, and followed by several sequels. The success of the first Tomb Raider has been credited with making Eidos Interactive a major force in the industry, and turned Eidos's 1996 pretax loss of $2.6 million into a $14.5 million profit. In September 1997, Sony Computer Entertainment's US arm, SCEA, signed an agreement with Eidos to make the sequel exclusive to the PlayStation console. The deal was extended to include Tomb Raider III (1998). Fourth and fifth games in the franchise, Tomb Raider: The Last Revelation (1999) and Tomb Raider: Chronicles (2000) respectively, followed.

After the critical failure of Tomb Raider: The Angel of Darkness in 2003, parent company Eidos put Crystal Dynamics, another Eidos-owned studio, in charge of Tomb Raider franchise development. This prompted the Core Design management team, Jeremy Heath-Smith along with his brother Adrian, to leave the company and establish a new one, Circle Studio. According to the brothers they hired many of Core Design's creative staff "We asked 37 people to join us and 36 came." and that "Core Design is now floundering around with a handful of people trying to get a project off the ground, and no real leadership, which is sad."

The remaining staff at Core Design worked on a timed puzzle game, Smart Bomb, for the PlayStation Portable (PSP), released in summer 2005. The company then worked on a proposal to remake the original Tomb Raider game, also for the PlayStation Portable. This version was cancelled by the publisher, Eidos, in favour of franchise development remaining with Crystal Dynamics.

In May 2006, Eidos announced that independent developer Rebellion Developments had acquired Core Design's assets and staff, while the Core brand and intellectual property, including Tomb Raider, remained in Eidos' possession. Under the new banner of Rebellion, the company went on to work on several titles including Free Running (2007), Shellshock 2: Blood Trails and Rogue Warrior (both 2009). Starting in January 2010, due to an expiring lease on Rebellion Derby's offices, Rebellion Developments started seeking restructuring opportunities for the studio. As no other possibility than closure was found, Rebellion Derby was closed down effective on 17 March 2010.

== Legacy ==
In July 2010, shortly after the closure of the studio, a nearby road in Derby was named "Lara Croft Way", in honour of the studio's contribution to the creative industries.

== Games developed ==
Year	Game	Platform(s)
1988	Action Fighter	Amiga, Atari ST, Amstrad CPC, Commodore 64, ZX Spectrum
1989	Dynamite Düx	Amiga, Atari ST, Amstrad CPC, Commodore 64, ZX Spectrum
1989	Rick Dangerous	Amiga, Atari ST, MS-DOS, Amstrad CPC, Commodore 64, ZX Spectrum
1989	Saint and Greavsie	Amiga
1989	Switchblade	Amiga, Atari ST, Amstrad CPC, Commodore 64, ZX Spectrum, Amstrad GX4000
1989	Axel's Magic Hammer	Amiga, Atari ST
1990	Torvak the Warrior	Amiga, Atari ST
1990	Corporation	Amiga, Atari ST, MS-DOS, Sega Genesis
1990	Monty Python's Flying Circus: The Computer Game	Amiga, Atari ST, MS-DOS, Amstrad CPC, Commodore 64, ZX Spectrum
1990	Skidz	Amiga, Atari ST
1990	Impossamole	Amiga, Atari ST, Amstrad CPC, Commodore 64, ZX Spectrum, Turbografx-16
1990	Rick Dangerous 2	Amiga, Atari ST, MS-DOS, Amstrad CPC, Commodore 64, ZX Spectrum
1990	CarVup	Amiga
1991	War Zone	Amiga
1991	Chuck Rock	Acorn, Amiga, Amiga CD32, Atari ST, Commodore 64, Sega CD, Game Gear, Sega Genesis, SNES, Master System
1991	Heimdall	Acorn, Amiga, Atari ST, MS-DOS, Sega CD
1991	Frenetic	Amiga, Atari ST
1992	Doodlebug	Amiga, Atari ST
1992	Chuck Rock II: Son of Chuck	Amiga, CD32, Sega CD, Game Gear, Sega Genesis, Master System
1992	Curse of Enchantia	Amiga, MS-DOS
1992	Hook	Sega CD, Sega Genesis
1992	Premiere	Amiga, CD32
1992	The Adventurers	Amiga
1992	Thunderhawk	Amiga, Atari ST, MS-DOS, Sega CD
1992	Wolfchild	Amiga, Atari ST, Sega CD, Game Gear, Sega Genesis, SNES
1992	Jaguar XJ220	Amiga, Sega CD
1992	Wonder Dog	Amiga, Sega CD
1993	Asterix and the Great Rescue	Game Gear, Sega Genesis, Master System
1993	Encore	MS-DOS
1993	Blastar	Amiga
1993	Blob	Amiga
1993	Cyberpunks	Amiga
1993	Darkmere	Amiga
1994	Corkers	Amiga
1994	BC Racers	Sega 32X, 3DO, Sega CD, MS-DOS
1994	Heimdall 2	Amiga, CD32, MS-DOS
1994	Universe	Amiga, CD32, MS-DOS
1994	Banshee	Amiga, CD32
1994	Dragonstone	Amiga, CD32
1994	Battlecorps	Sega CD
1994	Soulstar	Sega CD
1994	Bubba 'n' Stix	Amiga, CD32, Sega Genesis
1995	Skeleton Krew	Amiga, CD32, Sega Genesis
1995	Asterix and the Power of the Gods	Sega Genesis
1995	The Big Red Adventure	Amiga, MS-DOS
1995	The Scottish Open: Virtual Golf	MS-DOS, PlayStation, Saturn
1995	Firestorm: Thunderhawk 2	MS-DOS, PlayStation, Saturn
1996	Shellshock	MS-DOS, PlayStation, Saturn
1996	Tomb Raider	MS-DOS, PlayStation, Saturn
1996	Blam! Machinehead	PlayStation, Saturn
1997	Swagman	PlayStation, Saturn
1997	Fighting Force	Windows, PlayStation
1997	Tomb Raider II	Windows, PlayStation
1998	Ninja: Shadow of Darkness	PlayStation
1998	Tomb Raider III	Classic Mac OS, Windows, PlayStation
1999	Fighting Force 2	Dreamcast, PlayStation
1999	Tomb Raider: The Last Revelation	Dreamcast, Windows, PlayStation
2000	Tomb Raider: Chronicles	Dreamcast, Windows, PlayStation
2000	Tomb Raider	Game Boy Color
2001	Tomb Raider: Curse of the Sword	Game Boy Color
2001	Project Eden	Windows, PlayStation 2
2001	Thunderhawk: Operation Phoenix	PlayStation 2
2002	Herdy Gerdy	PlayStation 2
2002	Tomb Raider: The Prophecy	Game Boy Advance
2003	Tomb Raider: The Angel of Darkness	Mac OS X, Windows, PlayStation 2
2005	Smart Bomb	PlayStation Portable
2007	Free Running	PlayStation Portable
