= AMX Mouse =

Computer mouse for ZX Spectrum, Amstrad CPC, BBC Micro and Acorn Electron

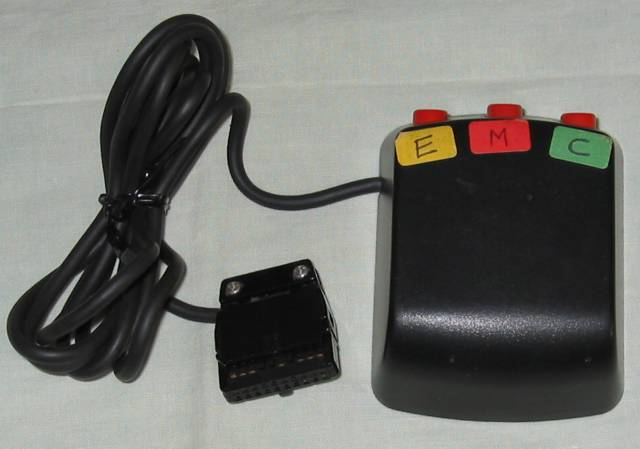
- Connects to: ZX Spectrum; Amstrad CPC; BBC Micro
- Common manufacturers: Advanced Memory Systems
- Introduced: 1985; 41 years ago
- Type: computer mouse

AMX Mouse was a 1985 computer mouse sold by the British company Advanced Memory Systems. The mouse has 3 buttons. It was sold with a dedicated interface, and usually with some accompanying software such as AMX Art (MacPaint clone), AMX Pagemaker, AMX Palette, AMX Control and Icon Designer.

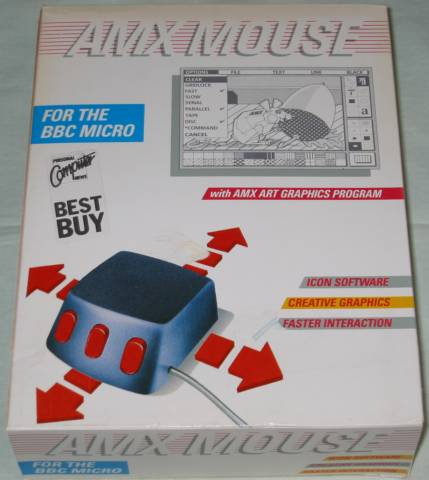
Box

== Market ==
The AMX Mouse product was sold for the ZX Spectrum, Amstrad CPC and BBC Micro computers, along with the Acorn Electron (through Advanced Computer Products), these being popular home computers at the time. As such, it allowed modern user interfaces to be present in common household machines.

It was compatible with art software such as OCP Advanced Art Studio or Max Desktop. The game Starglider is also listed as being compatible.

== Other software ==
Other available software for the BBC Micro from the manufacturer was:

- AMX 3D Zicon which took 3D vector drawings and converted them to AMX Art format. Also allowed sketching in 2D and converting to 3D;
- AMX Database which was a database with a graphical user interface;
- AMX XAM which created multiple choice exams with pictures from AMX Art;
- AMX Paintpot which coloured pictures produced with AMX Art.
