= CarVup =

1990 video game

- Cover art
- Developer(s): Core Design
- Publisher(s): Core Design
- Designer(s): Robert Toon
- Programmer(s): Robert Toon
- Artist(s): Terry Lloyd
- Composer(s): Matthew Simmonds
- Platform(s): Amiga, Atari ST
- Release: EU: November 1990
- Genre(s): Platform, puzzle
- Mode(s): Single-player

CarVup is a platform game developed and published by Core Design in 1990. Based on Jaleco's 1985 arcade game City Connection, it was released for the Amiga and Atari ST.

== Gameplay ==
The gameplay involves controlling a cartoon-like car named Arnie, who is jumping from platform to platform while avoiding enemies. If the time limit in each level was reached, a demon-like creature called Turbo flies into the screen which homed in on the player within 15 seconds, costing them a life.

Much like City Connection, the objective of the game is to drive over every platform in the level, which changed the platforms in some ways. For example, in the construction zone the platforms are girders with holes for rivets. A rivet would appear in the hole once it was driven over. With this task completed, Arnie would be picked up by a helicopter and taken to the next level. At the end of three levels, Arnie would rescue an animal friend and continue on to the next themed level.

Themed levels include: construction site, Halloween, garden and other various themes.

== Development ==
Both the Amiga and Atari ST versions of CarVup began development in May 1990, and were released in November. CarVup's protagonist, Arnie, was initially named Carl. The game's plot was conceived before the team decided on a car protagonist; Robert Toon, CarVup's designer & programmer, stated that the team decided on an automotive aesthetic because "people can associate with cars and, because it has no brakes, it's easy to explain why it doesn't stop moving". CarVup was inspired by the similarly colorful & cartoony platformers Rainbow Islands and Rod Land; Terry Lloyd, CarVup's graphic artist, expressed that he wanted to have cartoon visuals without making them 'too simplistic'. Toon further expressed that CarVup was made to look "like it came from a console or arcade game". Most of CarVup's graphics were created in OCP Art Studio on an Atari ST, and larger works such as the title screen were created in DEGAS Elite. Memory limitations impacted CarVup's graphic design, limiting the number of frames each animation could have; this also impacted Arnie's sprite, and making it 'stand out' despite the sprite's small size was a priority. Arnie was planned to have more facial expressions, but this was scrapped due to memory constraints. Parallax scrolling is unique to the Amiga version of CarVup, and isn't present in the Atari ST version.

== Reception ==
The One gave the Atari ST version of CarVup an overall score of 90%, praising its 'arcade-style' presentation accentuated by its "cute" graphics, as well as its "simplistic" and "tremendous[ly] fun" gameplay. The One praised CarVup's level design, which when combined with the game's enemy AI, created a challenge which requires skill. The One further praised CarVup's "wonderfully colourful" graphics, as well as its "jolly" music.

== See also ==
- City Connection
