= Free Running =

2007 video game

- Developers: Rebellion Developments (PS2, Wii); Core Design (PSP)
- Publishers: Ubisoft, Reef Entertainment, Graffiti Entertainment
- Composer: Martin Iveson
- Platforms: Microsoft Windows, PlayStation 2, PlayStation Portable, Wii
- Release: AU: 19 April 2007; EU: 20 April 2007; Wii, Windows: EU: 1 October 2009; NA: 28 April 2010 (Wii); NA: 3 December 2019 (PC)
- Genres: Sports, platforming
- Modes: Single-player, multiplayer

Free Running is a 2007 video game for the PlayStation 2, PlayStation Portable, Wii and Microsoft Windows, developed by Rebellion Developments and Core Design and published by Ubisoft, Reef Entertainment, and Graffiti Entertainment. A Nintendo DS version was planned, but cancelled. The game was originally due for release in 2005 but was delayed due to apathy from its original publisher, Eidos.

== Gameplay ==
Free Running is a freerunning sports game, with mechanics similar to those found in skateboarding titles such as the Tony Hawk's series. The objective of the game is a representation of freerunning, and players must demonstrate speed alongside flamboyance. The player is required to navigate their character through an urban environment by climbing, leaping, wall-running and other acrobatic maneuvers. Points are earned by performing combinations of such moves, and completing mini-challenges such as checkpoint races. Sébastien Foucan, the inventor of freerunning, is your mentor and guides you through the game's tutorial in the PS2 version. He was removed in later ports. The Wii port is played with either the Wii Remote and Nunchuk or the Classic Controller.

== Reception ==
Reception

Aggregate score
Aggregator	Score
Metacritic	(PSP) 65/100 (PS2) 61/100 (Wii) 51/100

Review scores
Publication	Score
Edge	7/10
Eurogamer	5/10
GamesMaster	75%
PlayStation Official Magazine – UK	6/10 (OPS2) 5/10
PSM3	70%
VideoGamer.com	5/10
The Sydney Morning Herald	2/5

The game received "mixed" reviews on all platforms according to the review aggregation website Metacritic. Eurogamer criticized the PlayStation 2 version's stiff controls and camera, leading to unease in performing tricks and combinations. It did not compare favourably to the fluid movement in Prince of Persia: The Sands of Time and Crackdown – titles that were deemed to be better free running games than Free Running.
