= Fighting Force =

1997 video game

- North American PlayStation cover art
- Developer: Core Design
- Publishers: Eidos Interactive (PS, Win); Crave Entertainment (N64); Electronic Arts Victor (JP)
- Producer: Ken Lockley
- Programmer: Sarah Avory
- Artist: Roberto Cirillo
- Composer: Martin Iveson
- Platforms: PlayStation, Windows, Nintendo 64
- Release: PlayStation: NA: 5 November 1997; PAL: November 1997; Windows: PAL: October 1997; Nintendo 64: NA: 1 June 1999; PAL: December 1999
- Genre: Beat 'em up
- Modes: Single-player, multiplayer

Fighting Force (Note: Known in Japan as Metal Fist) is a beat 'em up video game developed by Core Design and published in 1997 by Eidos Interactive for PlayStation and Windows. A Nintendo 64 version was published by Crave Entertainment in 1999. The Japanese version for the PlayStation was published by Electronic Arts Victor. Announced by Core shortly after the success of Tomb Raider, Fighting Force was highly anticipated and commercially successful but met with mixed reviews. It was followed by Fighting Force 2.

== Gameplay ==
Players control one of four characters as they move through urban and science fiction environments, battling waves of oncoming enemies with weapons including soda cans, knives, cars, and guns. The player can make some choices as to which territory to travel through.

== Story ==
The four characters have various reasons for taking on Dr. Dex Zeng, a criminal mastermind with an army at his command who predicted that the world would end in the year 2000. After New Year's Eve 1999, Dr. Zeng believed that there was an error preventing the apocalypse, so he decided to correct it by destroying the world himself. The action starts with a police cordon around Zeng's office skyscraper, moving to such locales as a shopping mall, subway and Coast Guard base before finally ending at the top of Zeng's island headquarters.

== Characters ==
A screenshot of Ben "Smasher" Jackson punching a generic enemy

Players choose from a selection of four characters: Hawk Manson, Mace Daniels, Alana McKendricks and Ben "Smasher" Jackson. Hawk Manson and Mace Daniels are two all-around characters. Hawk is somewhat stronger than Mace who is in turn faster than Hawk. Ben "Smasher" Jackson is a large and slow bruiser capable of lifting and throwing the engines of cars at enemies. Alana McKendricks is a fast but soft-hitting teenager with an effective jump-kick. All four characters have a special move that can be performed with the loss of a portion of health.

== Development and release ==
Core Design originally pitched the game to Sega as a potential fourth entry in Sega's Streets of Rage series. In an August 1996 interview with German magazine Sega Magazin, Core Design staff described their in-development project as a three-dimensional game inspired by Streets of Rage. The team discussed plans for up to five characters fighting simultaneously on screen, destructible environments, and both indoor and outdoor locations. At the time, the game was being developed exclusively for the Saturn, with the developers stating that a direct PlayStation conversion would not be possible. Sega declined; according to Core, Sega explained that it had its own plans for continuing the series. Core opted to go ahead with the game as a standalone, multi-platform title, and started work on it. Core Design collaborated with ten coders from EA Japan in making the game.

The story line and character designs were done by Marc Silvestri. The character of Dr. Zeng was inspired by Heaven's Gate.

A "Battle Arena" mode was added to the game during development, but it was cut from the final version.

In addition to the PlayStation, Windows, and Nintendo 64 versions, a Sega Saturn version was developed and eventually completed. After Eidos decided against publishing this version, Sega Europe secured the publishing rights and announced a European release date of November 1997, but ultimately cancelled the release. Despite its cancellation, French magazine Mega Force published a review of the Saturn version, awarding it a score of 90%. An early prototype, with older character designs, was leaked in November 2008. In February 2024, the released Core running demo disc (which provided a real-time demo of multiple Core Design Saturn titles), which post-dates the leaked beta, was hacked to be playable.

Eidos demonstrated a playable Nintendo 64 version at the 1998 E3. Eidos later cancelled this version of the game, but in February 1999 publisher Crave Entertainment purchased the rights from Eidos and put the game into its release schedule. The Nintendo 64 version was released in North America and Europe in 1999, under the title Fighting Force 64. Differences include partially improved graphics and changes in the available number of player lives.

In June 2024, Limited Run Games announced that they are working with copyright owner Square Enix to release the game and its sequel in Fighting Force Collection for the PlayStation 4, PlayStation 5, Nintendo Switch and Windows (via Steam). The collection was released on 23 January 2026.

== Reception ==
Reception

Aggregate score
Aggregator	Score	
Aggregator	N64	PS
GameRankings	55%	64%

Review scores
Publication	Score	
Publication	N64	PS
Edge	N/A	6/10
Electronic Gaming Monthly	3.25/10	7.625/10
Famitsu	N/A	25/40
Game Informer	6.75/10	6.5/10
GameFan	58% (Note: In GameFan's reviews of the Nintendo 64 version, one critic gave it 60, one 49, and another 65.)	71% (Note: In GameFan's reviews of the original PlayStation version, one critic gave it 65, one 70, and another 77.)
GameRevolution	D	N/A
GameSpot	4/10	5.3/10
Hyper	65%	65%
IGN	6.4/10	5.5/10
N64 Magazine	26%	N/A
Next Generation	N/A	3/5
Nintendo Power	6.7/10	N/A
Official U.S. PlayStation Magazine	N/A	3/5

The original PlayStation release received mostly mixed reviews. Critics overwhelmingly commented that the game has a satisfyingly large amount of interactive scenery to destroy or collect weapons from, but agreed that despite the transition to 3D, the gameplay was not meaningfully different from the 2D beat 'em ups of earlier console generations. GameSpot summed it up as "basically a 3D version of Capcom's classic, Final Fight, except the characters and enemies lack the personality that made Final Fight exciting." Some, however, looked on the game's lack of innovation as a virtue rather than a liability; Shawn Smith commented in Electronic Gaming Monthly, "What's cool about Fighting Force is that it plays like the old side-scrolling games of the same nature. Then you might ask, why not just make a 2-D one. Well, when the 3-D works, why not go with it?" Next Generation took more of a middle ground, stating that "despite its derivative nature, Fighting Force is a very fun game. Yet, it's just not the same huge leap forward for the Final Fight genre that we might have expected from the creators of Tomb Raider."

Besides a lack of originality, some critics criticized it for repetitiveness and took issue with how the control configuration assigns multiple actions to the same button while leaving other buttons on the controller unused, saying this often results in the character performing a different action than intended and leaving them open to enemy attacks. GamePro nonetheless opined, "Despite its few flaws, Fighting Force delivers the fierce fun and beat-fools-silly action that PlayStation gamers are looking for." (Note: GamePro gave the PlayStation version 4.0 out of 5 in all four categories (graphics, sound, control, and fun factor).) IGN, while contradicting GamePro by actually praising the game's controls, offered a somewhat more pessimistic overall take: "With solid graphics, impeccable control, yet almost zero innovation or variety, Fighting Force is a mixed bag. If in doubt, rent before you buy." AllGame gave the game three stars out of five, saying, "All in all, Fighting Force isn't a bad game. Just some problems that lie in the gameplay department and some graphical glitches that keep this title from achieving the status of the games it was modeled after." In Japan, where the game was ported and published by Electronic Arts Victor under the name Metal Fist (メタルフィスト, Metaru Fisuto) on 15 January 1998, Famitsu gave it a score of 25 out of 40.

PC Zone gave the PC version 88%, calling it "a computer game in which a lot of people get hurt in a variety of entertaining ways, with excellent 3D visuals and a surprising amount of detail." However, PC Gamer UK gave it 62%, calling it "A middle class game without fire in its belly that refuses to strive for better things."

GamePro and Nintendo Power gave the Nintendo 64 average reviews while the game was still in development under Eidos, months before the company handed its development rights over to Crave. (Note: GamePro gave the Nintendo 64 version 4/5 for graphics, 3.5/5 for sound, and two 3/5 scores for control and fun factor.)

The game was a commercial success, selling 1 million units worldwide and satisfying a demand for a Streets of Rage like 3D beat 'em up experience in the industry at the time. In the United States, the game sold 596,404 units.

== Legacy ==
A sequel, Fighting Force 2, was released on December 13, 1999 for the PlayStation and Dreamcast. Unlike the first title, Fighting Force 2 focuses on the character of Hawk Manson exclusively, and rewards a more stealthy approach.

A second sequel, Fighting Force 3 was also in development for the Xbox and PlayStation 2, but was cancelled during development.
