= The Big Red Adventure =

1995 video game

- Developer: Dynabyte
- Publisher: Core Design
- Platforms: MS-DOS, Amiga
- Release: 1995: MS-DOS; 1997: Amiga
- Genre: Adventure

The Big Red Adventure is an adventure video game developed by Dynabyte and published by Core Design for MS-DOS in 1995. It was released for the Amiga computers in 1997 by Power Computing on CD-ROM.

The Big Red Adventure is a sequel to Dynabyte's Nippon Safes Inc., a game that was "a moderate hit in Europe" according to Hardcore Gaming 101. It was developed in Italy.

== Gameplay ==
The Big Red Adventure is a graphic adventure controlled with a point-and-click interface.

== Plot ==
The Big Red Adventure follows the protagonists of Nippon Safes Inc. — Doug, Donna and Dino — as they find themselves in post-Soviet Russia. The villainous Doctor Virago hopes to revive Vladimir Lenin to help him revert Russia from capitalism to communism.

== Development ==
While The Big Red Adventure's predecessor, Nippon Safes Inc., used pixel art graphics, the artist left Dynabyte before the sequel's creation. Instead, the team digitized drawings done on paper to create the game's sprites. The game uses SVGA graphics.

Developed in Italy, The Big Red Adventure was published by the British company Core Design.

== Reception ==
Reception

Review score
| Publication | Score |
|---|---|
| Amiga Format | 86% |

Writing for Amiga Format, Andy Smith called The Big Red Adventure as a jolly good game, accessible to people who don't normally play adventure games and yet convoluted enough for people who do. Coming Soon magazine praised the graphics and humour. Generation 4 gave it 35% while PC Joker gave it 36%.

Hardcore Gaming 101 gave a negative review in 2016, citing the game's "obscure puzzles, lame humor and heavy-handed satire".
