= Universe (1994 video game) =

- CD32 cover art
- Developer: Core Design
- Publisher: Core Design
- Producer: Jeremy Heath-Smith
- Designers: Rolf Mohr; Gary Bottomley-Mason
- Programmer: Gary Antcliffe
- Artists: Rolf Mohr; Stuart Atkinson; Gary Bottomley-Mason
- Writers: Rolf Mohr; Gary Bottomley-Mason
- Composer: Martin Iveson
- Platforms: Amiga, CD32, MS-DOS
- Release: 1994
- Genre: Adventure game
- Mode: Single-player

Universe is a graphic adventure game developed and published by Core Design for the Amiga, CD32, and MS-DOS in 1994. It was Core Design's second and last effort in the adventure game genre after Curse of Enchantia, of which it was originally planned to be a sequel.

Universe is a space opera that tells the story of Boris, a young man who has been summoned from modern Earth to another universe, where he is destined to become its long forecast savior from evil. The game received mostly positive reviews.

== Gameplay ==
Universe uses a point and click user interface to allow the player to control the game's protagonist with the mouse to move through various scenes and locations and interact with objects. When the right mouse button is clicked, an icon based control bar becomes accessible for which the player can decide on what actions to take, such as looking at items and picking up objects. Some commands require the player to denote what objects the character is carrying to use to accomplish the action - for example, to attack something, the player must click on the object that will be used to attack an object in the scene. The game's use of the control bar means players must be clear on what action commands they are using, as well as what objects they are interacting with. The game features some open exploration in places, as well as moments where the player must perform the right actions to proceed; failure to do so ends the game, forcing the player to either restart or reload from their last save game.

== Plot ==
Boris Verne, a 16-year-old boy living in England, is sent on an errand by his mother to deliver mail to his eccentric uncle George. Arriving at his house, George leaves his nephew alone to make some tea, leading Boris to explore. In doing so, he comes across his uncle's latest invention, a pod-like device called the Virtual Dimension Inducer. Deciding to see how it works, Boris activates the Inducer, causing himself to be teleported into a parallel universe called Pararela, and onto an asteroid cluster with a breathable atmosphere called Pfenellop. Discovering a small town on one of the asteroids, Boris works to activate a machine, causing him to suffer a sudden mind shock that allows him to understand the language of others. Heading into the settlement, Boris meets with a young woman named Silphinaa, who does her best to help him when he reveals he has no idea where he is.

Through Silphinaa, Boris learns that Pfenellop used to be peaceful, until a tyrannical empire occupied the cluster and arrested anyone who resisted them. Learning he faces a similar fate if he remains, Boris is advised to head for the Wheelworld to meet Silphinaa's friend for further help, but is unable to prevent the empire arresting her when he receives a premonitionary vision of their arrival. Acquiring Silphinaa's Personal Transport Vehicle (PTV) and a new suit with a wrist computer, Boris escapes before he is captured. While seeking a way to reach the Wheelworld, he receives a vision of the empire's tyrannical leader, Emperor Neiamises, who has sensed his arrival and orders his personal servant, Baron Keelev to find him.

Reaching the Wheelworld, Boris encounters a member of a monkly order called The Healers, who reveal to him that he is the destined saviour of Pararela who will bring down Neianises per a prophecy the Healers made that the emperor fears. After being given one half of a star chart needed to complete to aid him, Boris is forced to flee the Wheelworld when Keelev tracks him down. Boarding a star liner, Boris finds another member of the Healer who passes on the other half of the star chart. After evading a bounty hunter and stealing their PTV, Boris escapes from the liner before it is destroyed by a resistance force seeking to stop Neianises. Through another vision after escaping, Boris learns that the tyrannical emperor is seeking power gems to make him a god and is fighting against another empire led a race of aliens called the Mekaliens.

Using the star chart, Boris finds his way to a planet housing a portal that takes him to a decayed city, whereupon he secures a power gem containing positive charged energy. On another planet, he encounters a dying Mekalien, who reveals that the gem's positive energy will reflect any evil energy back at its attacker, and thus is a threat to Neianises. Making his way to the tyrant leader's home on the planet Coros, aided by the resistance group and its leader, a beast-like humanoid called Man-Beast, Boris breaks into Neianises' palace and confronts him. After exposing Keelev's plot to take his master's power, causing him to be sent to another dimension, Boris lulls Neianises into a false sense of security and hits him with the power gem, causing him to crumble into dust.

With the tyrant killed, the people of Coros welcome the end of the conflict, appointing Man-Beast as their new leader, and releasing those who had been wrongfully imprisoned. Although delighted to have helped, Boris still wishes to find the means to return home, and is soon startled when George appears amongst those celebrating Neianises, revealing he had been pursuing his nephew since he activated the Inducer. Saying goodbye to his new friends, Boris returns home with his uncle back to England, wondering how long he had been away for, before noting he is still wearing the clothing that he got from Silphinaa's home.

== Development ==
=== Curse of Enchantia 2 ===
Universe was the second and last point-and-click adventure developed by Core Design, who then instead concentrated on 3D games for the PC and fifth-generation consoles, including what would become Tomb Raider. Initially, it was going to be a direct sequel for Core Design's successful 1992 comic fantasy adventure game Curse of Enchantia, which would continue the adventures of the young teenager Brad as he would return to the other-dimensional realm of Enchantia with his sister Jenny to rid that world of the remaining evil witches. This game was planned but never released, in part because of Robert Toone's departure from the company.

=== Universe ===
The game "has grown up so much during the development that it has simply became a follow up", incorporating elements of a film script written by Rolf Mohr several years earlier while he was working with the Games Workshop. This spiritual successor game ultimately became known as simply Universe (its working title was Curse of Enchantia II), using a completely rewritten game engine and a similar user interface, but with inclusion of in-game text and dialogue. Universe's premise is also similar to that of Curse of Enchantia, featuring a young man (the protagonist's name was changed and he became somewhat older, but like Brad, Boris also has a sister named Jenny) who is transported to another world and has to rid it of an evil overlord, but the game is more serious in its tone.

Responding to some of the criticism directed at Curse of Enchantia, Core Design described Universe as being "a lot" more logical and less linear than their first adventure game. They also described the text-based system as an improvement over the use of only icons, the benefits being that it allowed conversations between characters and simply "it works". They also acknowledged that Curse of Enchantia had "suffered considerably" due to inclusion of action sequences, something that "adventure gamers don't want in their games”, so the ones in Universe were made "short and simple" enough. Furthermore, an improved engine allowed the game to load faster and fit on fewer floppy disks.

The game was notable for its then-unique ability to display 256 colors at once on a standard Amiga 500, instead of just 32, due to its innovative system SPAC (Super Pre-Adjusted Colour). Another interesting feature was its dynamic music system similar to LucasArts' iMUSE. Although the game co-designer Gary Mason claimed that this was a unique achievement on the Amiga, in reality, a similar system had already been implemented in The Chaos Engine game, which was released in early 1993, a year earlier.

Universe was at first supposed to feature a supporting character, following Boris through the game, but this had to be abandoned because the Amiga lacked enough memory to handle two scaled sprites of the characters at the same time. The animations of the sprite of Boris was rotoscoped; the character is actually a digitized version of Rolf Mohr.

== Reception ==
The Amiga version of the game received mostly highly positive reviews, including 85% from Amiga Computing, 87% from CU Amiga, and 86% from Game Master. Some other reviewers were more critical, such as 7/10 from Amiga Magazine or only 38% from Amiga Format.
