= Torvak the Warrior =

1990 video game

- Developer: Core Design
- Publisher: Core Design
- Composer: Matt Furniss
- Platforms: Amiga, Atari ST
- Release: 1990
- Genre: Platform / hack and slash
- Mode: Single-player

Torvak the Warrior is a hack and slash platform game published by Core Design in 1990 for the Amiga and Atari ST.

== Gameplay ==
The gameplay has similarities to Rastan.

== Reception ==
The game received a 52% score from Amiga Power four years after its release, with the review stating: "When Torvak jumps, he flies through the air with the grace of a big blue whale climbing a ladder, and the game quickly degenerates into a race to reach the end of each level before boredom completely overcomes you and you're forced to load up Total Carnage to have a bit of fun. Being old in itself isn't a crime, but being old and crap most certainly is."
