= City Connection =

1985 video game

- Japanese arcade flyer
- Developer: Jaleco
- Publishers: JP: Jaleco; NA: Kitkorp
- Platforms: Arcade, Nintendo Entertainment System, MSX, ZX Spectrum, mobile phone, Windows
- Release: July 1985: Arcade; JP: July 1985; NA: September 1, 1985 NES; JP: September 27, 1985; NA: May 1988 MSX; JP: 1986 ZX Spectrum; UK: 1989 Mobile; JP: September 17, 2002 Windows; JP: September 5, 2004
- Genre: Platform
- Modes: Single-player, multiplayer

City Connection (Note: Japanese: シティコネクション, Hepburn: Shiti Konekushon) is a 1985 platform video game developed and published by Jaleco for arcades. It was released in North America by Kitkorp as Cruisin'. The player controls Clarice in her Honda City hatchback and must drive over elevated roads to paint them. Clarice is pursued by police cars, which she can stun by hitting them with oil cans. The design was inspired by maze chase games like Pac-Man (1980) and Make Trax (1981).

City Connection was ported to the Famicom/Nintendo Entertainment System, MSX and ZX Spectrum. It was re-released in several Jaleco game collections and services such as the Wii's Virtual Console. These received mixed responses in North America, with critics disliking its simplicity, lack of replay value, and poor controls. Some felt it possessed a cute aesthetic and unique concept and was entertaining. Clarice is one of the first female protagonists in a console game. In Japan, the game has maintained a loyal following, and the NES version is seen as a classic for the platform; Jaleco's successor, City Connection Co., Ltd., was named after the game.

Jaleco released a sequel, City Connection Rocket, for Japanese mobile phones in 2004.

== Gameplay ==
Clarice jumping to another road whilst avoiding police cars

In City Connection, the player controls Clarice, a blue-haired teen driving an orange Honda City hatchback, as she travels around the world in the quest of finding herself the perfect man. Clarice traverses through twelve side-scrolling stages that take place within famous locations around the world, including New York, London, and Japan. To clear these levels, the player must drive over each of the elevated highways to change their color from white to green. The car can jump over large gaps to reach higher sections of the stage.

Clarice is constantly being pursued by police cars that follow her around the stage, and must also avoid flag-waving cats that block her from moving past them. Clarice can collect and launch oil cans at police cars and traffic vehicles to temporarily stun them; ramming into them while stunned will knock them off the stage. Cats are invulnerable to oil cans, and cannot be killed by any means. If the player remains on the same stage for an extended period of time, spikes extrude from the ground and instantly kills them. On occasion, a red-colored balloon may appear in the stage, and collecting three of these warps the player to a new area and grants them bonus points.

== Development and release ==
City Connection was developed by Jaleco and released in Japanese arcades in July 1985. In North America, the game was licensed to Kitkorp and published as Cruisin'. Many of the game's stages feature an arrangement of "Tchaikovsky's Piano Concerto No. 1". The song used when Clarice hits one of the flag-waving cats is "Der Flohwalzer", known in Japan as "Neko Funjatta" (lit. "I Stepped on the Cat"), while another stage features a remix of the song "Highway Star" by Deep Purple. City Connection is credited as being one of the first to use new music tracks for each stage as opposed to recycling one song. The car the player controls throughout the game is a Honda City hatchback, which is believed to be the source for the game's title. Jaleco based the game's concept on Namco's Pac-Man (1980) and Alpha Denshi's Make Trax (1981).

City Connection was ported to several consoles, including the Nintendo Entertainment System (NES), ZX Spectrum, and MSX. The NES version, which was Jaleco's first release for the system in North America, replaces Clarice with an unnamed male protagonist (though the Famicom release does feature Clarice), alongside other minor differences. The Japanese Family Computer (Famicom) version is included in the compilations Jaleco Collection Vol. 1 (2003) for PlayStation and JaJaMaru Jr. Denshoki Jaleco Memorial (2004) for Game Boy Advance. The NES versions were digitally re-released on the Virtual Console service for the Wii in 2008, and the Nintendo 3DS and Wii U in 2013. A version for Japanese cellular phones was published in 2002 through i-Mode devices. Mediakite produced a port of the arcade game for Windows in 2003, while Jaleco produced a remake titled City Connection DX for mobile phones in Japan. Hamster Corporation released a digital version of the game under their Arcade Archives series for the PlayStation 4 in 2014, and for the Nintendo Switch in 2018. The NES version was released on the Nintendo Classics service in 2019.

== Reception ==
Reception

Review scores
Publication	Score
AllGame	3/5
Eurogamer	6/10
IGN	5/10
Nintendo Life	5/10
Computer Entertainer	3/5

City Connection has maintained a loyal following in Japan, where it became one of Jaleco's most successful and beloved games. The NES version, in particular, is viewed as a classic title on the system for its accurate portrayal of the arcade original. In 2003, Yuge listed it as being among the console's greatest games, through its unique gameplay, colorful visuals, and memorable soundtrack. The magazine staff described it as being a game that fulfills the dreams of children who want to play arcade games.

The NES version and its digital re-releases received mixed reviews in North America, by comparison. Critics focused largely on its overall simplicity and poor controls. A reviewer for Computer Entertainment US felt that the game was hindered by its lack of replay value for older players. IGN and Nintendo Life reviewers Lucas M. Thomas and Marcel van Duyn respectively both believed the game didn't age well and was too simplistic; Duyn described it as being "still well below par" compared to other NES ports of classic arcade games. Agreeing with them was Nintendo Life's Steve Bowling (now part of Good Vibes Gaming with Ashton Paulsen (Rob Paulsen's Son), and Derrick Bitner), who claimed the Wii U version was a shallow conversion of an arcade game he considered "already lost to the ages", specifically for its ill-conceived controls.

Critics felt City Connection, in spite of its flaws, possessed a cute aesthetic and unique gameplay. Computer Entertainer US believed its cute visual style would appeal to younger players and its challenge to older ones, and said what little the game had to offer was enjoyable. Christopher Michael of AllGame likened its gameplay to Pac-Man and similar maze-chase arcade games from the era, writing that its graphics and gameplay made it a must-play for the platform. Reviewing for Eurogamer, Dan Whitehead compared its gameplay to Q*bert and its horizontal-scrolling to Defender, and made for an addictive game that justified its price tag. Thomas and Duyn agreed that City Connection's gameplay was simplistic and enjoyable, though constrained by its controls and high difficulty.

== Legacy ==
Clarice is credited as being among the first female protagonists in a console game. She appears as a playable character in the PlayStation game GUNbare! Game Tengoku (1998), misspelled as "Claris" and bearing little resemblance to her original design, and in the high-definition remaster The Game Paradise Crusin' Mix (2018) as downloadable content.

In 2004, Jaleco released a sequel named City Connection Rocket for Japanese mobile phones through i-Mode. The game places Clarice in the role of a spy working for a secret organization to capture criminal leaders from around the world. Rather than painting sections of road, Clarice must now collect briefcases placed in specific areas in each stage while avoiding police cars and other types of enemies. Rocket was bundled with City Connection DX for a 2015 re-release on the PlayStation Vita under Hamster's Appli-Archives series, which was available through the PlayStation Mobile service. PlayStation Mobile closed in September 2015, delisting the game from the PlayStation Store and other supported devices.

The company City Connection, which is the current owner of Jaleco's video game assets, is named after the game.

== See also ==
- CarVup
