= Skidz =

1990 video game

- Developer: Core Design
- Publisher: Gremlin Graphics
- Platforms: Amiga, Atari ST
- Release: 1990
- Genre: Sports

Skidz is a skateboarding and BMX themed sports video game developed by Core Design for the Amiga and Atari ST. It was released in 1990 and published by Gremlin Graphics.
