= Curse of Enchantia =

British graphic adventure game

- Cover art by Rolf Mohr
- Developer: Core Design
- Publishers: Core Design; Virgin Games (PC CD)
- Producer: Jeremy Heath-Smith
- Designers: Robert Toone; Ian Sabine; Chris Long
- Programmers: Robert Toone (Amiga); Ian Sabine (PC)
- Artists: Rolf Mohr; Billy Allison; Stuart Atkinson
- Composer: Nuke (Martin Iveson)
- Platforms: Amiga, MS-DOS
- Release: EU: November 1992; AU: April 1993
- Genre: Adventure game
- Mode: Single player

Curse of Enchantia is a graphic adventure game developed and released by the British video game company Core Design for MS-DOS and the Amiga in 1992. The game tells the comic fantasy story of Brad, a teenage boy from modern Earth who was magically abducted to the world of Enchantia by an evil witch-queen. Brad needs to escape and find a way to defeat her, so he can to go back to his own dimension.

Curse of Enchantia, at first known as Zeloria, was Core Design's first attempt in the adventure genre as they set up to compete with LucasArts and Sierra On-Line. The game features several highly unconventional and controversial game mechanics and design choices for an adventure title from that era, including having many simple action game style sequences and being practically devoid of in-game text and conversations.

Nevertheless, Curse was generally well received upon its release, especially by the Amiga magazines, where the game's graphics and animation received particular praise even as its illogical puzzles and unusual design choices were often criticized. A direct sequel was briefly planned but eventually turned into a spiritual successor game titled Universe and released in 1994.

== Gameplay ==
The game's starting location and its icon-driven user interface bar in an Amiga screenshot

Curse of Enchantia uses a point and click style user interface, similar to Sierra's Creative Interpreter from the King's Quest series. The player character is commanded with an icon based control bar that is accessible by pressing the right mouse button, which also pauses the game. The control bar features seven main actions: inventory, pick up/take, manipulate/use (opening up a sub-menu with eight further actions: unlock, insert, push/pull, eat, wear, throw, give and combine), look, talk (only either "Help!" or "Hi!"), attack, and jump. Usually, the protagonist has to stand in the immediate vicinity to the game's objects and characters, which then appear as icons in a separate bar, in order to interact with them. A joystick or computer keyboard input can also be used.

Unusually for an adventure game genre, Curse of Enchantia does not feature text-based object descriptions or conversations. Its few short scenes of rudimentary communication with friendly non-player characters use only a minimalist system of pictograms in comic book-style speech balloons, usually displaying the objects that the characters need to be delivered. Instead, the game features several action-style sequences, such as dodging hazards or timing the use of items. This resulted in some classifying it as an action-adventure game. However, the character is never at risk of dying, being effectively 'immortal' no matter the dangers, and thus every such task can be repeated until successfully completed, risking only losing a few points from the score. Jewels, gold coins, and other objects of value can be collected throughout the game for a higher score.

== Plot ==
You take part of a twentieth century kid who has been snatched off to this magical world. The idea is that a witch needs a young boy as an ingredient in a rejuvenation potion — you are the unlikely target. Once you get there the witch has you taken off to the dungeons where you are to be held (upside down in manacles) until she is ready for the spell. The aim of the game is to (surprise) kill the witch and dash back to one's own time.

— Ian Sabine, designer

In a parallel universe, a fantasy world of Enchantia is suffering under the cruel rule of a powerful coven of wicked witches. Their vain and terrible queen, who managed to surpass the rest in depravity, seeks a live male child from another dimension as the main ingredient of her desired spell of eternal youth. Having borrowed magic powers from all the other witches in Enchantia on the promise to make them too young forever, she created an invisible portal connection to Earth. One day in the 1990s, a young English teenager named Brad plays a baseball practice with his sister Jenny when the witch spots him through the portal and incants a summoning spell, making him suddenly vanish in a flash of light. The game begins as Brad, dressed in medieval-style clothing, wakes up in a dungeon cell. But the boy soon manages to escape, and then sets out on a journey to return home safely. In the course of his surreal adventure, he braves various dangers, meets a host of friendly and hostile characters, and rises to become a reluctant hero who just might break the titular curse and bring down the evil's reign.

After breaking out from his prison, Brad falls into a moat before coming to a halt in a cavern maze. Reaching the surface, he arrives at a nearby village; this location is repeatedly revisited throughout the game, as Brad comes back there after traveling to the various corners of the land, encountering bizarre characters and experiencing absurd adventures: the Edge of the World cliff, the Ice Palace, and the Valley of the Lost (a place where all kinds of things lost on Earth have gone to), all while searching for an unlikely set of items that would help him emerge victorious from the game's final showdown (including a fire extinguisher and a mechanical fan). In the end, the boy enters the evil Queen's castle to find and defeat her once and for all. Once she is no more, he gets instantly transported back to the baseball field where it all had started.

== Development and release ==
We looked at Core's existing software range to see if there was a type of game that would complement it. We decided that a graphical adventure game in the Sierra and Lucasfilm mould would go down a treat ... so a group of us adventure players sat down and designed the game.

— Rob Toone, designer

Core Design's original concept for the game had been to make it more of an action title rather than an adventure one, initially being envisioned as an isometric-view role-playing action role-playing game in the style of Core's own 1991 Heimdall, before the project has evolved into a more classic, completely 2D, side-scrolling adventure game (yet still sometimes being described as a role-playing game). It was proposed as "an adventure for people who hadn't played that kind of game before." The protagonist's effective invincibility was a late demand by the executive producer Jeremy Heath-Smith. The game's co-designer and the Amiga version's chief programmer Rob Toone said that their idea was to make these parts of the game "interesting without being difficult." Co-designer and the PC version programmer Ian Sabine stated that the lack of text "speeds up gameplay". Regarding the decision to keep the onscreen text to a minimum, Toone said that "too much reading can slow the game or kill it, like The Adventures of Willy Beamish," with the main artist Rolf Mohr adding that "hopefully, a picture will say a thousand words and make this system easy to use." According to Toone, "Lucasfilm gets most of its humour out of its text, whereas we hopefully get ours from comical animations and daft happenings." Core's Richard Barclay described it as "a huge icon-driven epic of the Sierra On-Line/Lucasfilm ilk." Mohr named Sierra's King's Quest and Space Quest series as his big influences.

One of the game's original backgrounds hand-drawn by Rolf Mohr. Most Amiga magazines praised the game's visuals for what they called "wonderful graphics", "splendid visual style," and "beautifully drawn world of magic and adventure."

It took a month for the project to be storyboarded before any actual art and programming work started on it. Mohr recalled: "Back then there was not much in the way of 'game design', much less 'concept art'. I was shown extremely brief paragraphs or diagrams of each scene/puzzle and given full latitude to make up pretty much whatever I wanted. It was a lot of fun, although I found myself questioning some of the gameplay choices." The two versions of the game, for the PC and the Amiga, were developed separately and simultaneously, in order to make the best possible product for each platform rather than a quick port from one system to another. A version for the Amiga CD32 had also been planned. The game mixes backgrounds hand-drawn with acrylic paint and then digitized by Mohr, and sprite bitmap graphics made in Deluxe Paint and Brilliance on the Amiga with some rotoscoped animations. The animators Billy Allison and Stuart Atkinson created "huge" DPaint-made character sequences but they had to implement them in game in more efficient way due to computer memory limitations. In addition, the PC version used the full 8-bit color of a 256-color palette, but the Amiga version had to be downscaled to only 32 colors (including 24 colors for the background and eight colors for the main character; the other characters had to be drawn with these colors). The game also uses various digitized sound effects.

The game's design and plot evolved during development, including the title change. Several revisions resulted in some of the already made some graphics and other content being cut from the game, in particular in the final area of the castle's interior (which at first was intended to be much larger and to feature monsters that would guard it, but in the end was reduced to a small area with the task basically limited to finding a secret chamber). Allison said, "there were whole sections that never made it in, like a roller skating frankenstein, that shattered into loads of tiny versions of him if you 'killed' him, I did the sprites etc, it just never made it to the game." Its working title had been at first Zeloria, which later caused some confusion as a number of video game magazines have continued to use "Zeloria" as the name of the world in the game; some other magazines also incorrectly assumed "Enchantia" to be the name of the game's antagonist, who is actually nameless (some articles feature also other names such as "Malizia" or "Meilbrum"). Some articles also featured an earlier and slightly different version of the plot, which involved a castle of three witches, who needed to drink a special potion every hundred years or else they would turn to dust, and the protagonist Brad's original task involved a rescue of his captured sister Jenny. In 1991, Zeloria was described as "a mystical and fantastic land, full of lost objects and witches - in fact, Zeloria is the land of the lost where all those loose socks and TV remote controls go." The name "Enchantia" was only proposed by Mohr late in the development as more fitting, to which the producer added "Curse of" to create the title (Mohr would later "accidentally" name Killzone as well).

Allison described the projects as a "zany Pythonesque take on the classic fairy tales." The game's story and elements were partially inspired by The Lion, the Witch and the Wardrobe, The Wonderful Wizard of Oz, The Snow Queen, and Disney animated films, and relies heavily on surreal humor and slapstick. It contains several Easter egg pop culture references, including the shop called "Benn's Costume Shop" complete with a costume of Batman, a band named "The Slugs" consisting of four humanoid slugs, getting into a frozen realm through a wardrobe, and encountering the wreck of Marie Celeste. Other connections might be accidental, such as its likeness to Lure of the Temptress, another fantasy adventure game that was developed at the same time (released in June 1992). Stuart Campbell, who described as Curse of Enchantia as "a funny version of Lure of the Temptress with a different plot," was not the only one who noted the two games' similarities to each other, especially regarding the initial dungeon-escape scenes in both games. As written in adventure gaming magazine Red Herring, "obvious similarities abound as you find that: 'the downtrodden villagers are praying for a return to a peaceful life, and the death of the evil one', which Is pretty much what they are doing in Lure of the Temptress."

Curse of Enchantia was officially revealed under this title at the European Computer Trade Show (ECTS) in April 1992, after missing the original March/April release date announced when it was known as Zeloria. The game was planned to be released in September 1992, but got delayed again to November 1992. The game's original release was accompanied by a promotional campaign with valuable prizes (computers and money) in some magazines such as France's Joystick. Owners of computers with newer PC operating systems need to run it using DOSBox. Curse of Enchantia was one of the first CD-ROM adventure games, however it can not be played from the CD directly and had to be installed on the hard drive. Virgin Games bundled it with many of the earliest PC CD-ROM drives in 1993. The game was also re-released on CD as part of Encore Multipack, together with Heimdall and Thunderhawk.

== Reception ==
Reception

Review scores
Publication	Score
GamesMaster	88%
PC Gamer (UK)	65%
ACAR	83%
Amiga Action	94%
Amiga Computing	93%
Amiga Format	62%
Amiga Power	87%
Amiga User International	86%
CU Amiga	89%
PC Format	76%
The One	79%

Critical reception of Curse of Enchantia was mostly positive, especially in regard to its graphics and animation. According to The One, overall the game "was reasonably well-received." However, the game was derided by some for its confusing user interface system, often illogical puzzle solutions and what some reviewers thought was a lack of quality humor, plot development and atmosphere, attributing it to the absence of text and dialogue.

British reviewers in particular have often praised the Amiga version of the game. Brian Sharp of Amiga Action gave this "well-made and cleverly constructed package" the Amiga Action Accolade award, calling it "flawless" and "easily the best adventure game on the Amiga to date." It hinted that using a joystick for control may make certain sections of the game "less annoying to play." Amiga Computing gave it the Gamer Gold award, calling the game "excellent", "down-right bloody enchanting" and Core Design's "easily greatest and most impressive game yet," and even advising to "buy it today because if you don't you will more than likely commit suicide, it's that good." Tony Gill of CU Amiga gave the game the CU Gold Screen award and said that while "some of the puzzles are a bit illogical, the further into the game you get the more luxurious it becomes. Around each bend the graphics get better and better." Les Ellis of Amiga Power said it was one of funniest games he has ever played and called it "a classic adventure, which with a few tweaks could have easily beaten the Monkey Island [series] and a worthy addition to any collection and will stand as a challenge to any adventurer." According to Amiga Power one year later, "with such a high degree of humour this adventure is well on its way to becoming a classic. It's slightly overpriced and some of the puzzles are a little obscure but these are minor quibbles. Overall this is a great game." Atari ST User even called it a "contender for the best game of the year."

There was also much positive reception in the gaming press elsewhere in the English world. The "absolutely enchanted" Ken Simpson from Australia's ACAR said the game's "delightful" graphics and animation "are among the most tastefully executed [he has] ever seen," but noted the problems with its interface system and difficulty. One preview in North American magazine Computer Gaming World called it "a pretty looking product" of "a Loom / KQV / Legend of Kyrandia approach," even as another called it "actually more of a multi-screen puzzle game than a traditional animated adventure," adding that "gamers with a strong penchant for puzzle should find it entertaining" despite its "a bit clumsy" interface. Bill Holder of Australia's OZ Amiga called it "a light-hearted and funny adventure that appeals to almost everyone" and "one of the better releases of 1993."

On the other hand, Ed Ricketts of Amiga Format called Curse of Enchantia "light years behind" Monkey Island with "no comparison" to Monkey Island 2, as "the textless interface just doesn't work - despite the designers' belief, you do need words" and there is "no humour to speak of, no genuinely amusing humour, anyway." Even as a preview in The One Amiga called it a "game set to rival even the mightiest of American adventures," the magazine's David Upchurch wrote that "the game lacks real humour and atmosphere. This may be partly due to the lack of text in the game - it's hard to relate to the characters you meet," and "although entertaining, Curse of Enchantia is to Monkey Island 2 what Smash is to mashed potato," that is "just a weaker substitute." Lee Perkins of The Age opined that "Curse of Enchantia might be seen as a mite disappointing by fantasy gamers with moderately sophisticated tastes." PC Gamer UK described it an "average generic fare" as "the graphics are pretty" but the game "lacks atmosphere and feels too much like a succession of annoyingly vague puzzles rather than an adventure story."

In France, Curse of Enchantia was given the high ratings of 84% in Génération 4 (PC), and 90% / 91% (Amiga & PC) in Joystick. The game also received the scores 46/60 from Slovenian Moj Mikro, 79% from Sweden's Datormagazin, and 8/10 from Serbian Svet Igara. German magazine PC Player gave it only 38%, saying that the game may make the players "nostalgic for Sierra titles," but the reviews from other German magazines were generally better, including the scores of 8.3/12 in Amiga Magazin, 53/60 (Amiga & PC) in Aktueller Software Markt, 68% in both PC Joker and PC Games, 69% in Amiga Joker, 71% (Amiga) & 81% (PC) in Power Play, and 86% in Amiga Games. Italian magazines K and The Games Machine gave it their high scores of 802/1000 and 91%, respectively, with K noting the game as accessible for those not speaking English. Reception was also strong in Poland, where Curse of Enchantia was positively reviewed in C&A (95%) and Secret Service (77%), and featured among "the best adventure games" of 1992 (alongside Alone in the Dark, Indiana Jones IV and The Legend of Kyrandia) by Computer Studio. However, in a 1993 ranking of graphic adventures games by Spanish magazine PCmanía, Curse of Enchantia received only three stars out of six due to its "strange" design and despite Core Design's "trademark" good graphics.

=== Retrospectives ===
In 1995, Amiga Action ranked it as the eleventh best adventure game on the Amiga. A 1996 feature by France's PC Soluces gave it three stars out of five, stating that the game's interesting characters, surrealist feel and varied graphics were dragged down by "a bit weak" plot and an interface that was not intuitive enough. Wirtualna Polska ranked it as the 27th best Amiga game, but noted that "proponents of adventure genre's purity" to this day dislike the game for its "unwise flirt" with action-adventure, as well as the 19th best adventure game in history, opining that the lack of written text "perfectly" fits with the game's story and specific type of humor. It was also ranked as the 26th best Amiga game by Polish console gaming magazine PSX Extreme, noted for its strong playability.

In more recent reviews, the website GamersHell found the lack of any text messages and dialogue in the game to be "an interesting design element." However, Gry-Online included the lack of even partial descriptions of objects among the reasons why Curse of Enchantia failed to become an outstanding game, along with a too many user interface icons and "useless" features. An advertisement for Curse of Enchantia was featured in GamesRadar's humor article about "what game ads looked like when the SNES was alive".

Curse of Enchantia was also the first Amiga video game owned by Ben "Yahtzee" Croshaw, who in 2012 made a Let's Play video of the PC version of the game, saying it had "great graphics, great animation, appalling game design.", and lamented much on the fact that the game contained "no kind of logic whatsoever" Yahtzee had earlier, in a 2005 interview, said, "it was a game I had difficulty putting down, with beautiful scenery and a great sense of humour, although I understand it's looked down upon by modern standards", something which he opposed in the 2012 Let's Play, then stating that the game lacked humour, and got a warning from co-commentator Gabriel Morton regarding rose-tinted glasses who likened playing the game to "eating a bowl of psilocybin".

== Legacy ==
In Universe, the hero Boris Verne is mysteriously transported from a quiet English town to a parallel universe in the future which is ruled by a tyrannical emperor. Sharp-witted readers will spot the similarities between this and Core's previous adventure Curse of Enchantia, in which the hero Brad is mysteriously transported from a quiet English town to a parallel universe in the past which is ruled by a tyrannical coven of witches.

— PC Format magazine, 1994

A direct sequel for the game was briefly planned by Core Design. Few details were made available, but it would continue Brad's fight against the witches but his sister Jenny was considered to play a much larger role. However, it was never released (in part because of Robert Toone's departure from the company), as the new game "has grown up so much during the development that it has simply became a follow up." Its working title has still remained "Curse of Enchantia 2", but only "for practical reasons". This spiritual successor game ultimately became known as Universe. Released in 1994, the game uses an upgraded game engine of Curse of Enchantia and a similar user interface. Responding to some of the criticism directed at Curse of Enchantia, Core Design described Universe as being "a lot" more logical and less linear than their first adventure game. They also described the text-based system as an improvement over the use of only icons, its benefits including allowing conversations between characters. They also acknowledged that Curse of Enchantia has "suffered considerably" due to inclusion of action sequences, something that "adventure gamers don't want in their games." The game's plot premise has remained notably similar to that of Curse of Enchantia, featuring a young man (the protagonist's name was changed from Brad to Boris, but he also has a sister named Jenny) who is transported to another world which has to save from an evil mage-king. However Universe is more serious in its tone, as the game's humor only serves as comic relief and "it was never intended to be as silly as Enchantia."

Simon the Sorcerer, a 1994 adventure game similarly featuring a modern boy protagonist transported to a fantasy world where he has to vanquish an evil wizard, was partially inspired by Curse of Enchantia, and a similar cover art was used for King's Quest VII. The game has also inspired the name of the Polish reggae band Enchantia, who chose this name because they thought it "feels warm". The game's chief artist Rolf Mohr said the cover art for Disney's 2007 film Enchanted could have been inspired by his cover art for Curse of Enchantia. He called it "a case of Art imitating Disney imitating Art," since he has been himself "definitely" inspired by Disney while working on the game. The "magical world of Enchantia" is the setting of the video game Enchantia: Wrath of the Phoenix Queen, but it does not appear to be otherwise related. Curse of Enchantia was also a "pretty big" influence on Yahtzee's own adventure games.
