= Bubba 'n' Stix =

1994 video game

- CD32 cover art
- Developer: Core Design
- Publisher: Core Design
- Designer: Simon Phipps
- Composers: Martin Iveson (Amiga, CD32); Nathan McCree (CD32, Genesis)
- Platforms: Genesis, Amiga, CD32
- Release: Amiga, CD32; 1994; Genesis: EU: July 1, 1994; NA: July 1994
- Genre: Platform
- Mode: Single-player

Bubba 'n' Stix is a side-scrolling platform game for the Sega Genesis, Amiga and CD32 developed and released by Core Design. The Genesis version was released in the United States and featured a promotional tie-in with the Bubblicious bubble gum brand.

The player controls Bubba, a redneck character, who is accompanied by a sentient stick named Stix. Stix can be used in various ways to help Bubba defeat enemies and get past obstacles: for instance, Stix can be thrust into a hole in the side of a platform so that Bubba can climb higher.

== Development ==
According to designer Simon Phipps, originally Core Design had wanted a "moody, dark and atmospheric" game featuring an adventurer wielding a multipurpose stick. It became apparent to him that a realistic approach to the design was not feasible. As a result, Phipps, along with collaborator Billy Allison, sketched out a large number of mostly outlandish uses for the game's central tool. After reviewing the drawings, Core subsequently gave the go-ahead to develop the game.

The game's protagonist started out as a green long-necked alien and went through several iterations until the developers settled on Bubba.

== Reception ==
Reception

Review scores
| Publication | Score |
|---|---|
| AllGame | SMD: 3.5/5 |
| Amiga Computing | AMI: 85% |
| Amiga Format | AMI & CD32: 85% |
| Amiga Power | AMI & CD2: 84% |
| Electronic Gaming Monthly | SMD: 6.75/10 |
| Flux | SMD: 7/10 |

The four reviewers of Electronic Gaming Monthly gave the Genesis version a 6.75 out of 10, particularly praising the originality of the gameplay concept and the highly challenging puzzles. GamePro likewise praised the game's originality and "thought-provoking challenges". Flux magazine gave the genesis version a 7 out of 10 and saying the game's humor makes Bubba 'n' Stix stand out from other games and they also praised the graphics describing it as "bright, cartoonish and cute". In 1995, MegaZone included the game on their "Top 50 Games In History".

== See also ==
- Bubble and Squeak, a similar game released the same year
