= Jaguar XJ220 (video game) =

1992 video game

- Developer: Core Design
- Publisher: Core Design
- Designers: Jason Gee, Sarah Jane Avory, Mark Price
- Programmer: Sarah Jane Avory (Note: Credited as Mark Avory)
- Artist: Jason Gee
- Composer: Martin Iveson
- Platforms: Amiga, Mega-CD
- Release: Amiga: NA: 1992; Mega-CD: JP: 26 March 1993; NA: March 1993; EU: 2 April 1993
- Genre: Racing
- Modes: Single-player, multiplayer

Jaguar XJ220 is a pseudo-3D racing game released by Core Design for the Amiga in 1992 and Mega-CD in 1993. The car featured is the eponymous Jaguar.

== Gameplay ==
The game takes place in a series of championship races across 12 countries, with three races in each. The player starts in England but must decide which country to race in next, which costs the team various amounts. The player can also choose to repair damage to the car. The game also featured a two-player mode similar to the Lotus challenge games.

The game features an edit mode that allows players to create their own track.

== Reception ==
Jaguar XJ220 received good reviews. Amiga Action rated the game 98% and praised the intuitive gameplay and the inclusion of a track editor. CU Amiga praised the quality of the game's sound effects, graphical detail, track editor, weather effects, and gameplay options, saying they set it apart from other racing games. The One Amiga rated the game 85% and called it an essential purchase, better than its popular competitor Lotus II. The magazine said that the game was the best arcade-style racing game available.

== See also ==
- Lotus (video game series)
