= Swagman (video game) =

1997 video game

- Developer: Core Design
- Publisher: Eidos Interactive
- Producers: Jeremy Heath-Smith; Troy Horton
- Designer: Richard Morton
- Programmer: Chris Long
- Artist: James Ryman
- Writer: Vicky Arnold
- Composer: Nathan McCree
- Platforms: PlayStation, Sega Saturn
- Release: Saturn: EU: April 1997; PlayStation: NA: 1997; EU: 7 July 1997
- Genre: Action-adventure
- Mode: Single-player

Swagman is a 1997 action-adventure video game developed by Core Design and published by Eidos Interactive in Europe for the Sega Saturn and in North America for the PlayStation. In the game, players assume the role of Zack and Hannah to free the imprisoned Dreamflight fairies and stop the villain Swagman from unleashing his horde of monsters upon the world, whose inhabitants cannot wake up from their nightmares. The title was developed in conjunction with other projects at Core Design, taking influence from the works of Tim Burton. Versions for both the 32X and Atari Jaguar CD were announced but not released. It was received with mostly positive reception from critics.

== Gameplay ==
PlayStation version screenshot.

Swagman is an action-adventure game with platform elements that is played in a top-down perspective, where the players initially take control of Zack and later Hannah to traverse through both the real and the Terrortries world, with the main objectives being to rescue captured Dreamflight members and stop the titular villain from unleashing his horde of monsters upon the world, whose inhabitants cannot wake up from their nightmares. Zack/Hannah can travel from the real world to the Terrortries world at almost any location by using a Mirror warp. Usable weapons throughout the game include a sword (equipped once the game starts), a flashlight to help see in dark places, bombs to blow stuff up, to name a few. Players are guided by the magician Scrabab, who gives key information and tips as to help the player on their journey.

== Synopsis ==
During one night at Paradise Falls, the siblings Zack and Hannah read a poem about an entity known as the Swagman, which tells how he and his minions emerged from Terrortries to spread nightmares on people with Dream-Ash. Both wind and a noise from their window alarmingly froze the siblings before seeing a Dreamfly sprinkling their room with Dreamdew. However, the Swagman lurks in the darkness to capture the Dreamfly with a swarm of Dream-Ash alongside other members of the Dreamflight, allowing the Swagman to send his minions between his and the real world, resulting with people not being able to wake up from their nightmares. Witnessing the events from their bedroom, Zack and Hannah hide in fear before their floor fractures with evil creatures emerging from a portal to invade their room and steal their bug collection. Hannah is found by one of the creatures, who conjures a spell to shrink her before being imprisoned on a bird cage. Zack has to rescue his sister and both siblings must free the captured Dreamflies before stopping Swagman and his minions from spreading more nightmare to people.

== Development and release ==
Swagman was developed by Core Design alongside other games for PlayStation and Sega Saturn at the England-based studio including Tomb Raider and Soulstar X, with a team of two programmers and three artists reportedly working on the project at one point. Both Jeremy Heath-Smith and Troy Horton headed its creation as producers, while Chris Long served as lead programmer. Both Richard Morton and James Ryman acted as designer and lead artist respectively, with Vicky Arnold writing the plot, while the soundtrack was scored by Nathan McCree. Other people also collaborated in its development. The title took influence from works of Tim Burton, while the pre-rendered graphics and sprites were created as 24-bit color images by using the 3D Studio graphics software program and Silicon Graphics (SGI) workstations.

Swagman was released for the Sega Saturn by Eidos Interactive in Europe in April 1997. A playable demo was included in the first issue of Saturn Power magazine. The PlayStation version was released in North America by Eidos on the same year. Versions for the 32X and Atari Jaguar CD were announced but not released.

== Reception ==
Reception

Review scores
Publication	Score	
Publication	PS	Saturn
AllGame	2/5	N/A
Edge	5/10	N/A
GameFan	249/300	N/A
GamesMaster	68%	N/A
HobbyConsolas	87/100	87/100
IGN	5.0/10	N/A
Jeuxvideo.com	14/20	14/20
Joypad	82%	N/A
M! Games	60%	60%
Mega Fun	76/100	76/100
Micromanía	75/100	N/A
Player One	89%	N/A
Video Games (DE)	65%	N/A
Absolute PlayStation	8.0/10	N/A
PSX Nation	75%	N/A
Sega Power	N/A	86%
Sega Saturn Magazine	N/A	88%
