= Chuck Rock II: Son of Chuck =

1993 video game

- European Mega Drive cover art
- Developer: Core Design
- Publishers: Core Design; Virgin Interactive Entertainment (Genesis, Sega CD)
- Producer: Jeremy Heath-Smith
- Designer: Robert Churchill
- Programmer: Daniel Scott
- Artists: Lee Pullen; Richard Morton
- Composer: Martin Iveson
- Platforms: Amiga, CD32, Game Gear, Sega CD, Master System, Mega Drive / Genesis
- Release: Amiga: EU: April 1993; Master System: EU: October 1993; Mega Drive/Genesis: NA: October 1993; EU: October 1993; Game Gear: NA: 1993; EU: October 1993; Sega CD: NA: 1993; EU: January 1994; CD32: EU: June 1994
- Genre: Platform
- Mode: Single-player

Chuck Rock II: Son of Chuck is a slapstick side-scrolling platform game developed by Core Design in 1993 for the Amiga, CD32, Game Gear, Sega CD, Master System, and Mega Drive/Genesis.

== Plot ==
The story takes up a little while after the end of the first game. After Chuck Rock rescued his wife, Ophelia Rock, from the T-Rex bully Gary Gritter, Chuck and Ophelia had a son, named Chuck Junior. Chuck senior works in a factory, where he develops great skill at carving automobiles out of stone. A rival manufacturer, named Brick Jagger (a pun on Rolling Stones lead vocalist Mick Jagger) becomes jealous of Chuck's abilities and kidnaps him, leaving it up to Junior to rescue his father.

== Gameplay ==
The gameplay is similar to the first game, but with some minor differences since the player controls Junior, rather than Chuck. This is a side-scrolling platform game with occasional rock-moving puzzles thrown in. Unlike Chuck, Junior carries a club that gives his attacks further reach.

== Development ==
During the development of the first Chuck Rock game, designer Robert Churchill saw the title of the film Son of Godzilla before the first game was completed, which inspired the idea for a potential sequel, Chuck Rock II: Son of Chuck. Following the success of the first Chuck Rock game, the developers at Core Design began planning the sequel. They were inspired by their enjoyment developing the first game, and had many leftover ideas not included in it to repurpose for the sequel. Churchill told graphics artist Lee Pullen about the idea of Chuck having a son, so Pullen created the new character, Chuck Junior, whom the developers immediately fell in love with. Wanting to try something different for Chuck Rock II, they changed the game's protagonist, using Junior instead of Chuck. Churchill stated that this decision allowed them to experiment with more gameplay techniques.

The game was programmed by Daniel Scott and Barry Irvine and produced by Jeremy Heath-Smith, with graphics by Pullen and Richard Morton. According to Scott, the Sega CD version of Chuck Rock II was based on the same engine as another Core Design game, Wonder Dog. He then started work on the Amiga version of Chuck Rock II, after which the developers decided to convert Wonder Dog to the console as well. The game was distributed in Germany by Bomico and in Italy by Leader. Chris Long programmed the Sega Genesis and Sega CD versions, while Ian Sabine programmed the Master System and Game Gear versions. The opening and ending cutscenes in the Sega CD version were animated by Mark Mason at Tony Garth Animation Ltd. and programmed by Mac Avory and Sean Dunlevy, with Billy Allison scanning the traditional animation and colouring it, alongside Jim Bot-Masey, Simon Phipps, Stuart Atkinson, and Adrian Mannion. The opening cutscene would also be used in the CD32 version.

The game uses an acid jazz soundtrack, composed by Martin Iveson. The end credits thank various contemporary acid jazz bands, presumably listing them as influences. The in-game boss "Ozrics Tentacles" shares a name with psychedelic rock band Ozric Tentacles. The music and sound effects in the Master System, Sega Genesis and Game Gear versions were composed and designed by Matt Furniss at Krisalis Software Ltd. Nathan McCree co-composed the soundtrack with Iveson for the Sega CD version.

== Reception ==
Reception

Review scores
Publication	Score
Computer and Video Games	CD32: 73/100
Mega Zone	Amiga: 78/100
MegaTech	Genesis: 86/100

Electronic Gaming Monthly praised the Game Gear retaining all the features and technical merits of the Genesis version, making particular note of the huge levels, "lots of technique", and good animations, though they criticized that the control is too loose. They score it a 7 out of 10. They gave the Sega CD version a 6.8 out of 10, commenting that this time the control is too stiff, but praising the opening cinema and the numerous bits of humor implemented in the level designs.

== Legacy ==
Around the time of the game's release, Core commissioned a comic strip in the long-running UK children's magazine Look-in, centering on the day-to-day lives of Chuck, Ophelia and Junior. As a meta-referential joke, Chuck Junior owned a "SteggaDrive" console, a reference to the Mega Drive name. A year later, the magazine was closed (after almost 25 years), and the final strip saw Chuck being swept away from his boat, presumed dead but washing up on a tribal island and being revered as a God – as an inexplicable comic touch, mourners at his "funeral" included then-Prime-Minister John Major.
