= Fighting Force 2 =

1999 video game

- North American Dreamcast cover art
- Developer: Core Design
- Publisher: Eidos Interactive
- Producer: Ken Lockley
- Programmers: Sarah Avory; Alex Davis; Daniel Scott; Neil Topham
- Artists: Roberto Cirillo; Lee Pullen; Jeremy Oldreive; Adrian Smith; Gary Tonge
- Writer: Murti A. Schofield
- Composer: Martin Iveson
- Series: Fighting Force
- Platforms: PlayStation; Dreamcast
- Release: NA: 13 December 1999 (PSX); NA: 22 December 1999 (DC); UK: 24 December 1999
- Genres: Beat 'em up, third-person shooter
- Mode: Single-player

Fighting Force 2 is a 1999 beat 'em up video game developed by Core Design and published by Eidos Interactive for the PlayStation and Dreamcast. It is the sequel to Fighting Force. Unlike its predecessor, the game was not released for Windows or the Nintendo 64, though its Dreamcast version was actually released.

== Overview ==
Set in the not-too-distant future, human cloning has become a reality but has been banned by international treaty. The Knackmiche Corporation is suspected of researching cloning, and mercenary Hawk Manson is sent on a covert mission to investigate.

It features hand-to-hand and weapons combat like the original game but does not include multiplayer support. While it includes more weapons and larger levels than its predecessor, the sequel includes only one playable character this time around: Hawk Manson.

== Reception ==
Reception

Aggregate score
Aggregator	Score	
Aggregator	Dreamcast	PS
GameRankings	50%	54%

Review scores
Publication	Score	
Publication	Dreamcast	PS
AllGame	2/5	2/5
CNET Gamecenter	3/10	3/10
Edge	4/10	N/A
Electronic Gaming Monthly	3.375/10 (Note: Four critics of Electronic Gaming Monthly gave the Dreamcast version each a score of 4/10, 5/10, 2.5/10, and 2/10.)	4.25/10 (Note: In Electronic Gaming Monthly's review of the PlayStation version, one critic gave it 2.5/10, two others gave it each a score of 5/10, and another gave it 4.5/10.)
EP Daily	3.5/10	3.5/10
Game Informer	5.25/10	5.5/10
GameFan	N/A	73%
GameRevolution	D	D
GameSpot	3.5/10	3.6/10
GameSpy	4/10	N/A
IGN	3.6/10	3/10
Next Generation	2/5	3/5
Official U.S. PlayStation Magazine	N/A	2/5

Unlike its predecessor which received some decent reviews, Fighting Force 2 was not very successful, and received mixed reviews on both platforms according to the review aggregation website GameRankings. Blake Fischer of NextGen said in its February 2000 issue that the PlayStation version was "Solid, but ultimately uninspiring. You'll burn out on this game long before you beat it." An issue later, Jeff Lundrigan of the same magazine called the Dreamcast version "The very definition of a two-star game: 'Perhaps competent; certainly uninspired.'"

In one review, Four-Eyed Dragon of GamePro said of the PlayStation version in its February 2000 issue, "Ultimately, Fighting Force 2 is battered by meager controls and lacks the fast action of other games in the same genre. At best, it's worth a rental for those who desire a night of fists-in-your-face gameplay." (Note: GamePro gave the PlayStation version two 4/5 scores for graphics and sound, 3/5 for control, and 3.5/5 for fun factor in one review.) In another review, the D-Pad Destroyer said that the same console version was "many things but it is not a good sequel to Fighting Force. Those of you looking for one more action/adventure title might want to give this one a look, but only until Syphon Filter 2. Come to think of it, just go play Syphon Filter again. You deserve better than this." (Note: GamePro gave the PlayStation version two 4/5 scores for graphics and sound, and two 3/5 scores for control and fun factor in another review.) Later on, the same author said of the Dreamcast version in one review, "If you really need that action fix on the Dreamcast, you might want to give Fighting Force 2 a look. Otherwise, you most likely just won't have much fun with this game. A little more work might have made this game better, but Fighting Force 2's DC version seems like more of an afterthought." (Note: GamePro gave the Dreamcast version 4/5 for graphics, 3.5/5 for sound, and two 3/5 scores for control and fun factor in one review.) In another review, Jake The Snake said of the same console version in the magazine's April 2000 issue, "Though it delivers some enjoyable mayhem, Fighting Force 2 doesn't offer much to separate it from other Dreamcast titles." (Note: GamePro gave the Dreamcast version three 3/5 scores for graphics, sound, and fun factor, and 4/5 for control in another review.)

== Legacy ==
In the United States, the game sold 232,508 PlayStation copies and 160,764 Dreamcast copies for a total of 393,272 units sold in the country. Due to its lackluster sales and a less-than-pleased fanbase, the series eventually ended. A third game was in development, but was cancelled when Core Design closed down.

In June 2024, Limited Run Games announced that they are working with copyright owner Square Enix to release the game and its predecessor in Fighting Force Collection for the PlayStation 4, PlayStation 5, Nintendo Switch and Windows (via Steam). The collection was released on 23 January 2026.
