= Ninja: Shadow of Darkness =

1998 video game

- Developer: Core Design
- Publisher: Eidos Interactive
- Producer: Troy Horton
- Designers: Joby Wood; Brian Tomczyk
- Programmers: Martin Jensen; Derek Leigh-Gilchrist; Dan Scott
- Composer: Martin Iveson
- Platform: PlayStation
- Release: EU: September 1998; NA: 8 October 1998
- Genres: Action, beat 'em up, platform
- Mode: Single-player

Ninja: Shadow of Darkness is a 1998 action beat 'em up platform video game developed by Core Design and published by Eidos Interactive for the PlayStation. The story follows a warrior named Kurosawa, who is tasked of ridding Feudal Japan of an unspeakable evil.

== Gameplay ==
The player character, Kurosawa, can combat enemies with hand-to-hand moves, magic spells, or weapons such as swords and throwing star that appear as item pick-ups. There are also pick-ups used to recover health.

== Development ==
Though Ninja was developed immediately following the popular Tomb Raider, Core Design did not want to be restricted to the Tomb Raider engine's interiors-only nature; instead, they built the game engine for Ninja: Shadow of Darkness from scratch.

The game was announced for release in August 1997 on Sega Saturn, PlayStation, and PC; further, a near-complete beta of the Saturn version was unveiled at this time. The PlayStation version was a port of the Saturn version. Mid-development, programmer Derek Leigh-Gilchrist commented that the port "has involved taking a lot of C code across from Saturn and modifying the 3D-specific bits to use the GTE [Geometry Transfer Engine]. This all worked fine, but it still wasn't fast enough to run the game at 30 frames per second, so I then converted the C code into optimized R3000 assembler with inline GTE code, which halved the processing time. Ninja now easily runs in 30 fps and has enabled us to start adding more detail to the game environment".

The Saturn version created floor surfaces with the Saturn's Mode 7-style scaling, a feature unique to the console which allows it to perform scaling effects without burdening the CPU with geometry calculations, whereas the PlayStation must construct floors out of polygons, a task which lowers the frame rate. Using the resulting performance benefit, the team tagged objects in the Saturn version with depth-cues, allowing them to create transparency effects in the game's water bodies.

The PlayStation version was delayed for over a year, and the Saturn and PC versions were cancelled entirely.

== Reception ==
Reception

Aggregate score
Aggregator	Score
GameRankings	66%

Review scores
Publication	Score
AllGame	3/5
Consoles +	83%
Computer and Video Games	2/5
Edge	6/10
Electronic Gaming Monthly	3.5/10 (Note: Four critics of Electronic Gaming Monthly gave the game each a score of 3.5/10.)
Game Informer	2.5/10
GameRevolution	C
GameSpot	5.3/10
IGN	6.5/10
Official U.S. PlayStation Magazine	1.5/5

The game received mixed reviews according to the review aggregation website GameRankings. Game Informer panned the game for its bad graphics and controls and not having a story, and recommended to play Tenchu: Stealth Assassins instead. GamePro however was more positive despite its problematic controls. (Note: GamePro gave the game 5/5 for graphics, two 4.5/5 scores for sound and fun factor, and 3/5 for control.)
