= Thunderhawk: Operation Phoenix =

2001 video game

- Developer: Core Design
- Publisher: Eidos Interactive
- Producer: Clint Nembhard
- Programmer: Sarah Avory
- Artist: Roberto Cirillo
- Composer: Martin Iveson
- Platform: PlayStation 2
- Release: EU: 12 October 2001; NA: 16 October 2001
- Genre: Combat flight simulation
- Mode: Single-player

Thunderhawk: Operation Phoenix, known as Thunderstrike: Operation Phoenix in North America, is a combat flight simulation video game developed by Core Design and published by Eidos Interactive exclusively for PlayStation 2. An Xbox version, with Xbox Live multiplayer, was also in production, but cancelled.

== Reception ==
Thunderhawk: Operation Phoenix received mixed reviews from critics. It has an aggregate score of 71.29% on GameRankings and 65/100 on Metacritic.
