= Premiere (video game) =

1992 video game

- Amiga cover art
- Developer: The 8th Day
- Publisher: Core Design
- Producer: Jeremy Heath-Smith
- Programmer: Daniel Scott
- Artist: Jerr O'Carroll
- Composer: Martin Iveson
- Platforms: Amiga; Amiga CD32
- Release: 1992: Amiga; 1994: CD32
- Genre: Platform

Premiere is a platform game published by Core Design for the Amiga in 1992 and Amiga CD32 in 1994. The player takes the role of Clutch Gable, a young film editor, who had the reels for his film stolen from him on the night before the film's premiere. The goal is to get to six different levels, represented as movie sets, and return the film. After each level the player has to deal with a boss stage that is represented in a form of a mini-game or arcade sequence.
