= Heimdall 2 =

1994 video game

- Amiga cover
- Developer: The 8th Day
- Publisher: Core Design
- Platforms: Amiga, CD32, MS-DOS
- Release: 1994
- Genre: Action-adventure
- Mode: Single-player

Heimdall 2 (also known as Heimdall 2: into the Hall of Worlds) is an isometric action-adventure video game developed by The 8th Day and published by Core Design for Amiga, CD32, and MS-DOS in 1994. It is set in a world based on Norse mythology and is the sequel to the 1991 game Heimdall. The CD-ROM versions contain a CD audio soundtrack composed by Martin Iveson.

== Reception ==
Amiga Computing rated the game 77%. The One Amiga gave the game 90%. Score gave the game 70%.
