= Heimdall (video game) =

1991 video game

- European cover art by Steve Simmons
- Developer: The 8th Day
- Publishers: EU: Core Design; NA: Virgin Games
- Platforms: Amiga, Atari ST, Archimedes, Mega-CD, MS-DOS
- Release: 1991: Amiga; 1991; Atari ST; 1992; MS-DOS; 1994; Sega CD; JP: March 18, 1994
- Genre: Action role-playing
- Mode: Single-player

Heimdall is an action role-playing game developed by The 8th Day, published by Core Design, and released in 1991 for the Amiga and for the Atari ST and MS-DOS in 1992. A Mega-CD version was published in early 1994. The game is a mixture of puzzle-solving, exploration, and dynamic combat mechanics, where players must explore various islands in the search for the fabled weapons belonging to the gods of Norse mythology. The game received favourable reviews upon its release, except for the Mega-CD which received mixed feedback.

A sequel, Heimdall 2, was developed by the same group and released three years later in 1994.

== Gameplay ==
Players begin a new game by controlling the lead character Heimdall through a series of arcade-style trials. This includes axe-tossing (cutting a maid's braids), boar hunting, and fighting on a ship which influences the character's stats and the crew members they can choose during a playthrough. After completing the trials, the player then picks five characters to form a crew alongside the main character. While Heimdall falls under the class of "Chieftain", the others fall under typical classes. This includes the Warrior, Wizard, Shipwright, Navigator, Druid, Blacksmith, and Berserker. These classes all differ in stats and skills and they each have their own strengths. While warriors make good melee fighters, wizards can cast spells more efficiently and identify scrolls and items more proficiently, while navigators can alert the player if travelling to another island might damage the party. The most critical stat of characters is energy and even though this can be replenished by eating food, any character who loses all of their energy dies and must be revived by magic.

The game features three modes: Navigation Map, Island Exploration, and Combat. Island Exploration is conducted via an isometric perspective, in which the player explores an island through different rooms. Players can take only Heimdall and two crew members with them onto the island, and can only leave through the entry point that they used. Most islands have a range of traps, including pits, spikes and arrows that can damage the player, along with monsters based on Norse mythology. In addition, players can acquire weapons, scrolls, gold, food, and various other items from either combat, treasure chests or just lying around. Some islands feature NPCs that can be interacted with, some of whom act as shops where players can buy or sell items.

Combat begins when the player interacts with monsters at their current location, though some are triggered by moving past a certain point. In combat, the player must reduce the enemy's energy to zero while avoiding the same fate. Only one character may fight and they can use various weapons such as bare knuckles, swords, axes, and throwing daggers to do damage. They can also use spells, defend against attacks, or flee from combat. Attacks are done in real-time, and what weapons and spells can be used depends on what each character possesses in their inventory. If the player wins a battle, they may find loot from their opponent.

The Navigation Map focuses on moving around the current game world the player is in, based on the main quest they are conducting. In this mode, players can rearrange their crew to denote who explores the island with Heimdall, as well as rearrange a party's inventory. Travelling between islands requires the player to choose a location they can reach from their current position. To reach a distant shore, players must move to an island that connects to it, but can decide whether to explore an island or continue travelling. The game features three major world maps to explore, each connected to a main quest to complete.

== Plot ==
The game begins with the Norse god Loki stealing Odin's sword, Freyr's spear and Thor's hammer and hiding them within the mortal world of the Vikings. Left powerless by his trickery, the gods decide to create an infant amongst the mortals who can bring back their weapons. In a small village of Vikings, a young woman finds herself magically pregnant with the god's destined offspring and gives birth to Heimdall. Upon growing to adulthood and completing a series of trials, Heimdall begins his search for the gods' weapons. In doing so, he explores the realms of Utgard, Midgard and Asgard, overcoming traps and monsters and eventually returns home with the missing weapons. Upon returning to his village, the gods bring him to them, and anoint him as one of their own for returning their power.

== Reception ==
Reception

Review scores
Publication	Score
ACE	895/1000 (Amiga)
Electronic Gaming Monthly	7/10, 7/10, 6/10, 6/10, 7/10 (SCD)
Famitsu	6/10, 4/10, 6/10, 5/10 (SCD)

Computer Gaming World stated that only those new to role-playing games would enjoy Heimdall, while given the existence of more sophisticated games, experienced players will find some other better titles of the genre. Reviewer Gary Whitta gave the Amiga version, praising its mix of gameplay styles, cartoon-like graphics and longevity.

Reviewing the Sega CD version, GamePro commented the graphics are mediocre during exploration and puzzle-solving, but better in the combat view, and that the music is "unobtrusive", but substandard for a CD game. Like Computer Gaming World, they deemed it an RPG for beginners rather than experienced fans of the genre.
