= OCP Art Studio =

Raster graphics editor

- Other names: Art Studio, The Advanced OCP Art Studio, Advanced Art Studio
- Developer(s): Oxford Computer Publishing
- Initial release: 1985; 40 years ago
- Stable release: The Advanced OCP Art Studio (Atari ST) / 1987; 38 years ago
- Operating system: Amstrad CPC, Atari ST, Commodore 64, ZX Spectrum
- Type: bitmap graphics editor
- License: Proprietary

OCP Art Studio or Art Studio was a popular bitmap graphics editor for home computers released in 1985, created by Oxford Computer Publishing and written by James Hutchby (original ZX Spectrum version).

It featured a GUI with windows, icons, tools and pull-down menus that and could be controlled using an AMX Mouse.

Some of the distinctive features include:

- Different pens, sprays and user-definable brushes
- An undo function
- Textured fills (with user-definable patterns including stipples, hatches, bricks, roof tiles, etc.)
- A font editor
- The drawing of geometrical shapes

== Releases ==
The OCP Art Studio, also known simply as Art Studio, was released in 1985 for the ZX Spectrum and in 1986 for the Amstrad CPC and Commodore 64.

The Advanced OCP Art Studio, also known as Advanced Art Studio, was released in 1986 for the ZX Spectrum 128K/+2 (developed by Dimitri Koveos), supporting the 128k memory models. In 1987 ports for the Commodore 64, Amstrad CPC and Atari ST (developed by Chris Hinsley) were released.

== Reception ==
Computer Gaming World in 1987 described OCP as "a versatile productivity tool ... a stunning and useful gift".

== Legacy ==
OCP Art Studio was frequently used for making graphics for home computer games in the early 1990s, and was used for games such as Gauntlet III: The Final Quest and CarVup.

== See also ==
- Deluxe Paint
