= Cyberpunks (video game) =

1993 video game

- Developer(s): Mutation
- Publisher(s): Core Design
- Designer(s): Adrian Robert Cummings, Rob Northen
- Artist(s): Adrian Robert Cummings
- Composer(s): Adrian Robert Cummings
- Platform(s): Amiga
- Release: NA: 1993
- Genre(s): Shoot 'em up - multi-scrolling
- Mode(s): Single-player

Cyberpunks is a top down shooter game for the Amiga developed by Mutation and published by Core Design in 1993.

The player controls three characters simultaneously. Game play consists of shooting enemy aliens and locating several door passes before being able to move onto the next level.
