= Monty Python's Flying Circus: The Computer Game =

1990 video game

- Developer: Core Design
- Publisher: Virgin Games
- Platforms: Amiga, Atari ST, Commodore 64, Amstrad CPC, ZX Spectrum
- Release: 1990
- Genre: Shoot 'em up
- Mode: Single-player

Monty Python's Flying Circus: The Computer Game is a 1990 scrolling shoot 'em up video game developed by Core Design. It was released by Virgin Games for Amiga, Commodore 64, Amstrad CPC, and the ZX Spectrum. It is loosely based on material and characters from the 1970s British comedy series Monty Python's Flying Circus, in particular the Gumby character.

== Gameplay ==
Screenshot from Amiga version of the game.

== Reception ==
Reception

Award
Publication	Award
Your Sinclair	YS Megagame

Contemporary reviews of the game were mixed, ranging from relatively high (89% for the Atari ST reissue from Zero magazine) to poor (47% for the Commodore 64 version from Zzap 64).
