= Eric B. & Rakim discography =

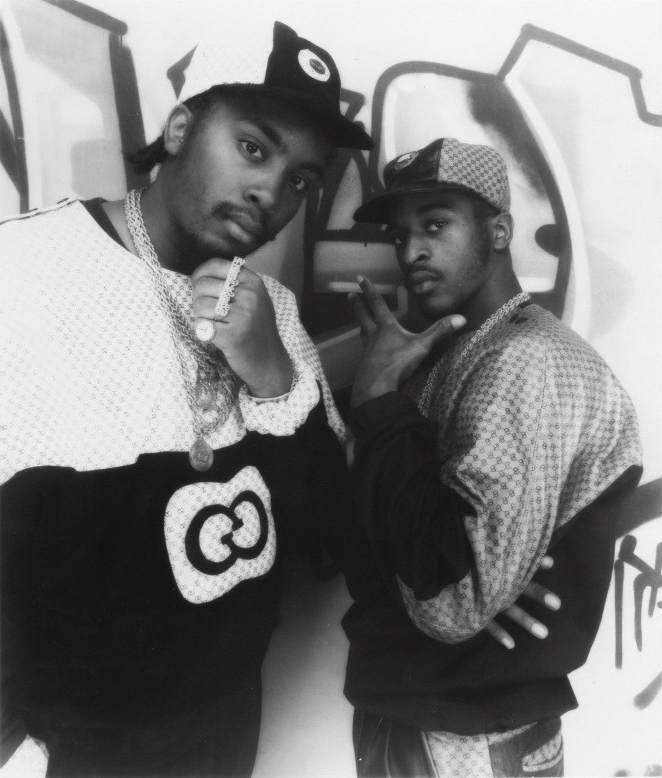
- Studio albums: 4
- Compilation albums: 5
- Singles: 15
- Music videos: 9

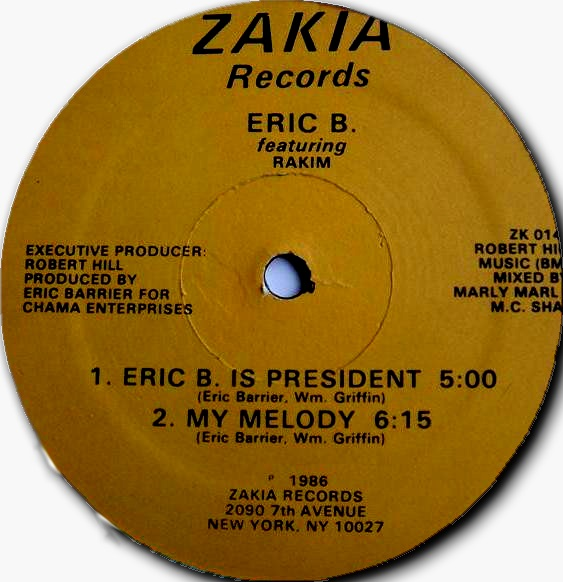
Eric B. & Rakim began their critically acclaimed partnership in 1986 with the release of "Eric B. is President" / "My Melody".

The discography of Eric B. & Rakim, an American hip hop duo, consists of four studio albums, five compilation albums, 15 singles, and nine music videos. Eric B. & Rakim formed and signed a record deal with Zakia Records in 1985. The following year, the duo signed a deal with 4th & B'way Records. Their debut album Paid in Full was released in 1987. In the United States, it peaked at number 58 on the Billboard 200, number 8 on R&B/Hip-Hop Albums, and was certified platinum by the Recording Industry Association of America (RIAA). It appeared on the Dutch, New Zealand, and UK Albums Chart. Paid in Full produced five singles, four of which appeared on Hot R&B/Hip-Hop Songs. The fifth single "Paid in Full" (1988) peaked in the top five of the Dutch and New Zealand Singles Chart.

In 1988, Eric B. & Rakim released their second studio album Follow the Leader. It peaked at number 22 on the Billboard 200, number 7 on R&B/Hip-Hop Albums, and was certified gold by the RIAA. The album peaked at 25 on the UK Albums Chart, and appeared on the Swedish, Dutch, and New Zealand Albums Chart. Three songs from the album were released as singles: "Follow the Leader", "Microphone Fiend", and "The R", the first and last of which appeared on Hot R&B/Hip-Hop Songs. The duo's third studio album Let the Rhythm Hit 'Em was released in 1990. It peaked at number 32 on the Billboard 200, number 10 on R&B/Hip-Hop Albums, and was certified gold by the RIAA. The album appeared on the UK and Dutch Albums Chart. Let the Rhythm Hit 'Em spawned three singles, including the title track and "In the Ghetto", both of which peaked within the top 10 on US Hot Rap Tracks.

Don't Sweat the Technique (1992) was the duo's fourth studio album. It peaked at number 22 on the Billboard 200 and number 9 on R&B/Hip-Hop Albums. It appeared on the UK Albums chart. Four songs, all of which appeared in the top 40 on R&B/Hip-Hop Songs, were released as singles from the album. The title track, released as the third single, topped Hot Rap Tracks. In 1992 after Don't Sweat the Technique, Eric B. & Rakim disbanded. From 2001 to 2010, five compilation albums have been released: 20th Century Masters – The Millennium Collection: The Best of Eric B. & Rakim (2001), Classic (2003), Gold (2005), Repaid in Full: The Paid in Full Remixed (2008), and Rarities Edition: Paid in Full (2010). None of these albums charted.

== Albums ==
=== Studio albums ===
List of studio albums, with selected chart positions
Title	Album details	Peak chart positions						Certifications
Title	Album details	US	US R&B	NED	NZ	SWE	UK	Certifications
Paid in Full	Released: July 7, 1987; Label: 4th & B'way/Island; Format: CD, CS, LP	58	8	30	41	—	85	RIAA: Platinum
Follow the Leader	Released: July 26, 1988; Label: Uni; Format: CD, CS, LP	22	7	43	46	35	25	RIAA: Gold
Let the Rhythm Hit 'Em	Released: June 19, 1990; Label: MCA; Format: CD, LP	32	10	90	—	—	58	RIAA: Gold
Don't Sweat the Technique	Released: June 23, 1992; Label: MCA; Format: CD, CS	22	9	—	—	—	73	
"—" denotes a recording that did not chart or was not released in that territory.

=== Compilation albums ===
List of compilation albums
Title	Album details
20th Century Masters – The Millennium Collection: The Best of Eric B. & Rakim	Released: June 19, 2001; Label: Hip-O; Format: CD
Classic	Released: April 22, 2003; Label: Universal; Format: CD
Gold	Released: June 14, 2005; Label: Hip-O; Format: CD
Repaid in Full: The Paid in Full Remixed	Released: February 5, 2008; Label: Island; Format: Digital download
Rarities Edition: Paid in Full	Released: January 5, 2010; Label: Island; Format: CD

== Singles ==
=== As lead artist ===
List of singles, with selected chart positions, showing year released and album name
Title	Year	Peak chart positions											Album
Title	Year	US	US Dance	US R&B	US Rap	BEL (FLA)	FRA	GER	IRE	NL	NZ	UK	Album
"Eric B. Is President"	1986	—	—	48	*	—	—	—	—	—	—	—	Paid in Full
"I Ain't No Joke"	1987	—	—	38	*	—	—	—	—	—	—	—	Paid in Full
"I Know You Got Soul"	1987	—	39	64	*	29	—	—	22	40	—	13	Paid in Full
"Move the Crowd"	1988	—	3	—	*	—	—	—	—	72	—	53	Paid in Full
"Paid in Full"	1988	—	3	65	*	12	49	27	30	5	2	15	Colors (Soundtrack)/Paid in Full
"As the Rhyme Goes On"	1988	—	—	—	*	—	—	—	—	—	—	81	Paid in Full
"Follow the Leader"	1988	—	11	16	*	—	—	—	—	75	—	21	Follow the Leader
"Microphone Fiend"	1988	—	—	—	*	—	—	—	—	—	—	74	Follow the Leader
"The R"	1989	—	28	79	14	—	—	—	—	—	—	76	Follow the Leader
"In the Ghetto"	1990	—	—	82	10	—	—	—	—	—	—	—	Let the Rhythm Hit 'Em
"Let the Rhythm Hit 'Em"	1990	—	37	23	2	—	—	—	—	—	—	81	Let the Rhythm Hit 'Em
"Mahogany"	1991	—	—	—	28	—	—	—	—	—	—	—	Let the Rhythm Hit 'Em
"What's on Your Mind"	1991	—	—	34	20	—	—	—	—	—	—	—	House Party 2 (Soundtrack)/Don't Sweat the Technique
"Juice (Know the Ledge)"	1991	96	—	36	7	—	—	—	—	—	—	—	Juice (soundtrack)/Don't Sweat the Technique
"Don't Sweat the Technique"	1992	—	12	14	1	—	—	—	—	—	—	—	Don't Sweat the Technique
"Casualties of War"	1992	—	—	23	11	—	—	—	—	—	—	—	Don't Sweat the Technique
"I Know You Got Soul '92"	1992	—	—	—	—	—	—	—	—	—	—	—	Non-album single
"—" denotes a recording that did not chart or was not released in that territory. "*" indicates a chart that did not exist at the time.

=== As featured artist ===
List of singles, with selected chart positions
Title	Year	Peak chart positions					Album
Title	Year	US	US R&B	NL	NZ	UK	Album
"Friends" (Jody Watley featuring Eric B. & Rakim)	1989	9	3	25	31	21	Larger than Life

== Music videos ==
List of music videos, with directors
Title	Year	Director(s)
"I Ain't No Joke"	1987	Vivien Goldman, Mick Sawyer
"Move the Crowd"	1987	Bill Dill
"Paid in Full"	1987	Bruno Tilley
"Follow the Leader"	1988	Scott Kalvert
"Microphone Fiend"	1988	Scott Kalvert
"In the Ghetto"	1990	David Hogan
"Let The Rhythm Hit 'Em"	1990	Julien Temple
"Don't Sweat the Technique"	1992	Demian Lichtenstein
"Juice (Know the Ledge)"	1992	Kevin Bray
"Casualties of War"	1992	Peter Darley Miller

=== As featured artist ===
List of music videos, with directors
Title	Year	Director(s)
"Friends" (Jody Watley featuring Eric B. & Rakim)	1989	Jim Sonzero
