= Gold (Eric B. & Rakim album) =

Greatest hits album by Eric B & Rakim
- Released: June 14, 2005
- Recorded: 1986–1992
- Length: 1:24:21
- Labels: Hip-O Records, Universal 988 142
- Producers: Eric B. (exec.); Pat Lawrence (exec.); Robert Hill (exec.); Eric B.; Rakim; The Bomb Squad; Large Professor; Paul C

Eric B & Rakim chronology
Classic (2003)	Gold (2005)

Gold is the third compilation album, by hip-hop duo Eric B. & Rakim. The album was released on June 14, 2005, on Hip-O Records and Universal Music Group.

== Background ==
The album contains remixes and extended mixes of Eric B. & Rakim's greatest hits as part of Universal Music Group’s Gold series.

Professional ratings
Review scores
Source	Rating
Allmusic	3.5/5 stars

== Track listing ==
Disc one
No.	Title	Writer(s)	Producer(s)	Length
1.	"Eric B. Is President" (from Paid in Full)	William Griffin; Eric Barrier	Eric B.; Rakim	6:18
2.	"I Know You Got Soul" (from Paid in Full)	Griffin; Barrier	Eric B.; Rakim	4:44
3.	"I Ain't No Joke" (from Paid in Full)	Griffin; Barrier	Eric B.; Rakim	3:53
4.	"Paid in Full" (Seven Minutes of Madness—The Coldcut Remix)	Griffin; Barrier	Eric B.; Rakim	7:09
5.	"My Melody" (Clean Original Mix)	Griffin; Barrier	Eric B.; Rakim	5:56
6.	"Follow the Leader" (from Follow the Leader)	Griffin; Barrier	Eric B.; Rakim	5:34
7.	"Microphone Fiend" (from Follow the Leader)	Griffin; Barrier	Eric B.; Rakim	5:14
8.	"Lyrics of Fury" (from Follow the Leader)	Griffin; Barrier	Eric B.; Rakim	4:12
9.	"Put Your Hands Together" (Fon Force Mix)	Griffin; Barrier	Eric B.; Rakim	5:28
10.	"The R" (Remix Edit)	Griffin; Barrier	Eric B.; Rakim	3:24
Total length:				51:52

Disc two
No.	Title	Writer(s)	Producer(s)	Length
1.	"Let the Rhythm Hit 'Em" (Clean UPSO Mix)	William Griffin; Eric Barrier; William Mitchell	Eric B.; Rakim; Paul C; Large Professor	6:11
2.	"No Omega" (Extended Remix)	Griffin; Mitchell	Eric B.; Rakim; Paul C; Large Professor	5:22
3.	"In the Ghetto" (Extended Mix)	Griffin	Eric B.; Rakim; Paul C; Large Professor	6:13
4.	"Run for Cover" (from Let the Rhythm Hit 'Em)	Griffin; Barrier; Paul McKasty; Mitchell	Eric B.; Rakim; Paul C; Large Professor	4:49
5.	"Mahogany" (from Let the Rhythm Hit 'Em)	Griffin; Barrier; McKasty; Mitchell	Eric B.; Rakim; Paul C; Large Professor	4:37
6.	"What's on Your Mind (House Party II Rap Theme)" (from Don't Sweat the Technique)	Griffin; Barrier	Eric B.; Rakim	5:21
7.	"Rest Assured" (from Don't Sweat the Technique)	Griffin; Barrier	Eric B.; Rakim	3:34
8.	"What's Going On" (from Don't Sweat the Technique)	Griffin; Barrier	Eric B.; Rakim	3:51
9.	"Juice (Know the Ledge)" (Main Mix)	Griffin; Barrier	Eric B.; Rakim; The Bomb Squad	4:01
10.	"Casualties of War" (Radical Radio Edit)	Griffin; Barrier	Eric B.; Rakim	4:09
11.	"Don't Sweat the Technique" (from Don't Sweat the Technique)	Griffin; Barrier	Eric B.; Rakim	4:21
Total length:				52:29
