= Microphone Fiend =

Single by Eric B. & Rakim

from the album Follow the Leader
- B-side: "Beats for the Listeners"
- Released: 1988
- Genre: Hip hop
- Length: 5:16
- Label: MCA
- Songwriters: Eric Barrier; Rakim Allah
- Producer: Eric B.

Eric B. & Rakim singles chronology
"Follow the Leader" (1988)	"Microphone Fiend" (1988)	"The R" (1989)

"Microphone Fiend" is the second single released from the hip hop duo Eric B. & Rakim's second album Follow the Leader. The song became a signature song for rapper Rakim, and AllMusic's Steve Huey says the song "weaves references to substance addiction throughout in explaining why Rakim can't keep away from the mic." Featuring a prominent sample of Average White Band's 1975 hit "School Boy Crush", the song was further evidence of Eric B.'s fondness for soul samples and became one of the most quoted songs in hip hop.

Rakim has described the song's theme as evolving from an initial concept of being in love with the microphone:

"Microphone Fiend" was a concept that I came up with kind of just vibing off the original sample. The original sample is [Average White Band's] "School Boy Crush" and to me, it's like I got a crush on a mic, you know what I mean? Like a 'microphone fiend', so it kind of morphed into [that].

== Covers ==
"Microphone Fiend" contains many of the elements that are often cited as having been prominent in the golden age of hip hop, such as samples, record scratching, and vocal syncopation. The song has been covered numerous times and has become a 'standard' of hip-hop music.

- The most notable cover was performed by Rage Against the Machine for their album Renegades.
- It was covered by Fun Lovin' Criminals and Marc & Mike Allica.
- Muse have played the Rage Against the Machine version's riff multiple times during live shows.
- Limp Bizkit interpolated the song on their song "Gimme the Mic", from their album Results May Vary.
- Iggy Azalea covered the song in its entirety during her The New Classic tour.
- Benny Reid and Jonathan Hay covered the song as a jazz instrumental and received a co-sign from Rakim.
- Radiohead have occasionally played the guitar riff of the song during various parts of their live shows.
- The rapper Dirtball did a cover on the Subnoize Souljaz album Blast from the Past.
- It was heavily sampled in the G-Mix for Snoop Dogg's single "I Wanna Rock" from the album Malice n Wonderland. It samples during Snoop's first verse.
- "School Boy Crush" by Average White Band is sampled heavily in the song and is also sampled in "Halftime" from Nas's debut album, Illmatic and Too Short's Life Is...Too Short from the album Life Is...Too Short.
- Aesop Rock references the song through a spelling sequence in "EWR – Terminal A, Gate 20," from his album Black Hole Superette.
