= In the Ghetto (Eric B. & Rakim song) =

1990 single by Eric B. & Rakim

Single by Eric B. & Rakim

from the album Let the Rhythm Hit 'Em
- Released: September 29, 1990
- Length: 4:22
- Label: MCA
- Songwriters: Eric Barrier; William Griffin
- Producers: Eric B. & Rakim; Large Professor (uncredited)

Eric B. & Rakim singles chronology
| "Microphone Fiend" (1988) | "In the Ghetto" (1990) | "Know the Ledge" (1992) |

Music video
- "In the Ghetto" on YouTube

"In the Ghetto" is a song by American rap duo Eric B. & Rakim. It was released on September 29, 1990, as the second single of their third studio album Let the Rhythm Hit 'Em, which was released by MCA Records. It was written and produced by Eric B. & Rakim themselves.

The song was also produced by Large Professor, despite being uncredited.

== Background ==
Rakim wrote the song after his father died and he viewed it as a conscious record.

I was going through a lot at that time, man. Pops passed away, and I was at the point where I ain’t know if rap made sense at that time, you know what I mean? So, going through that, and trying to make sense out of hip hop, I kind of stopped listening to music for a couple of months. When I finally put a beat on and picked up the pen, I wrote “In the Ghetto.” It was kinda therapeutic, but I guess, after that happening, it made sense to me to make a conscious record. It didn’t deal too much with my father, but it made sense to me.

— Rakim on the recording of the song "In the Ghetto"

== Music video ==
The music video features cameos by Michael Bivins and Rudy Ray Moore. The official video was directed by David Hogan.

== Charts ==
| Chart (1990) | Peak position |
|---|---|
| US Hot R&B/Hip-Hop Songs (Billboard) | 82 |
| US Hot Rap Songs (Billboard) | 10 |
