= Paid in Full (Eric B. & Rakim song) =

Single by Eric B. & Rakim

from the album Paid in Full
- B-side: "Eric B. Is on the Cut"
- Released: 1987
- Genre: Hip hop
- Length: 3:48 (single and album version); 7:10 (Coldcut "Seven Minutes of Madness" remix)
- Label: 4th & B'way
- Songwriters: Eric Barrier; Rakim Allah
- Producers: Eric B. & Rakim

Eric B. & Rakim singles chronology
"Move the Crowd" (1987)	"Paid in Full" (1987)	"Follow the Leader" (1988)

Audio sample
- file; help

Music video
- "Paid in Full" on YouTube

"Paid in Full" is a 1987 song written and produced by Eric Barrier and Rakim Allah of American hip hop duo Eric B. & Rakim. The song was released as the fifth single from the duo's debut studio album of the same name. It became one of the group's most successful singles, owing heavily to a popular remix of the song by English electronic dance music duo Coldcut.

== Background ==
In 1985, Eric B. launched a search for a rapper to complement his turntable work at the WBLS radio station in New York City. Rakim responded to his search, and the two later began to record tracks together in the home studio of one of Rakim's close friends, Marley Marl. After Def Jam Recordings founder Russell Simmons heard the duo's debut single "Eric B. Is President", he signed them to Island Records and began recording their debut studio album in early 1987, alternating between Marley Marl's home studio and Manhattan's Power Play Studios. The resulting album, Paid in Full, was released in July 1987.

English dance music duo Coldcut were commissioned to produce a remix of the song to be included on the "Paid in Full" single, with the result being given the subtitle "Seven Minutes of Madness". When "Paid in Full" was eventually released as the album's fifth and final single, it became a hit in American clubs. It experienced much more commercial success overseas, however, thanks largely to the Coldcut remix. "Seven Minutes of Madness" became one of the first commercially successful remixes, becoming a top fifteen hit in countries such as Germany, the Netherlands and the United Kingdom. Coldcut were paid 700 pounds for their remix work. Despite its success, Eric B. dismissed the remix as "girly disco music"; Rakim, however, called it the best remix he had ever heard. Along with the track, "Move the Crowd", "Paid in Full" peaked at #3 on the US Hot Dance Club Play chart.

== Composition and lyrics ==
Like much of the duo's output, "Paid in Full" – produced by Eric B. & Rakim themselves – utilizes several sampled elements. To construct the song's drum track, Eric B. looped a portion from "Ashley's Roachclip", a 1974 song by funk group The Soul Searchers. The bassline was sampled from "Don't Look Any Further" by singers Dennis Edwards and Siedah Garrett. Towards the end of the track, Eric B. also repeatedly scratches the line "This stuff is really fresh!" from "Change the Beat", a much-sampled record by hip hop pioneer Fab 5 Freddy.

Coldcut's remix of "Paid in Full" has been described as a selective remix – one which adds or subtracts material from the original composition. Coldcut incorporated several new elements in producing their remix, including the addition of various vocal samples. The most prominent of these samples was the voice of Israeli singer Ofra Haza, taken from her recording of "Im Nin'alu". Jonathan More of Coldcut had previously played the Haza record in clubs and found that when he lowered its pitch, it synced perfectly with the "Ashley's Roachclip" drum sample. The success of the remix helped thrust Haza into the public eye. "Im Nin'alu" was remixed and released as a single in its own right, and sales of Haza's 1984 album Yemenite Songs increased dramatically. Haza only took issue to the fact that she was not informed of the sample. The Coldcut remix opens with a vocal sample, "This is a journey into sound.", which is the voice of British actor Geoffrey Sumner. "Now wait a minute, you better talk to my mother" comes from Humphrey Bogart and the 1946 classic film The Big Sleep. An actor portrayed Bogart for this portion in the music video. The lines "Pump up the volume" and "Def with the record" are sampled from Eric B. & Rakim's own song "I Know You Got Soul", also from Paid in Full. Other sample sources present in the remix include an anonymous James Brown, Don Pardo, the Peech Boys and the Salsoul Orchestra. "Paid In Full" is believed to be the first hip hop record to implement layers of singing vocal samples over a drumbeat.

== Recording ==
“Paid in Full” was one of three songs the duo recorded at Power Play studios the night before a record label deadline. Engineer Elai Tubo substituted for Patrick Adams, who engineered most of the tracks on the album but was too tired to work another overnight session. Rakim wrote the lyrics in about five minutes, just before recording, and Eric B added the ad-lib at the end to lengthen the song.

== Critical reception ==
"Paid in Full" received acclaim from music critics, who complimented the song's lyrics and production.

British DJ and presenter of radio and television Tim Westwood picked it as one of his favourites in 1995, adding, "This defines the sound of hip hop for years to come. Rakim was the greatest lyricist of all time. Incredible lyrics – they conjure up incredible imagery."

Rolling Stone magazine named "Paid in Full" the tenth greatest hip hop song of all time and number 132nd best song on their "Top 500 Best Songs of All Time". Rakim's wordplay was praised and comparisons were drawn to American jazz musician John Coltrane: "[Rakim's] incandescent thought-bubble rap – barely a minute long – is all iced flow and sly beat-dodging, a good-vs.-evil meditation that calmly frames thug life inside real-life economics and a novelist's eye for detail." In 2022, the magazine ranked it number 36 in their list of "200 Greatest Dance Songs of All Time". VH1 placed the song at number 24 on their list of the "100 Greatest Hip Hop Songs".

The Coldcut remix has also been acclaimed, with its utilization of samples – particularly that of "Im Nin'alu" – being complimented. Dorian Lynskey of The Guardian named it a "benchmark remix" and placed it in his top ten list of remixes. Chuck Eddy of Spin called the remix Coldcut's "greatest moment".

== Music video ==
The official music video was directed by Bruno Tilley, who was the in-house art director and later creative director at 4th & B'way's parent company Island Records.

== Charts ==
Chart (1987–88)	Peak position
France (SNEP)	49
Netherlands (Single Top 100)	5
New Zealand (Recorded Music NZ)	2
UK Singles (OCC)	15
US Hot R&B/Hip-Hop Songs (Billboard)	65
West Germany (GfK)	27
