= I Ain't No Joke =

Single by Eric B. & Rakim

from the album Paid in Full
- B-side: "Eric B. Is on the Cut"
- Released: 1987
- Recorded: 1987
- Genre: Hip hop
- Length: 3:54
- Label: 4th & B'way
- Songwriters: Eric Barrier; Rakim Allah
- Producers: Eric B. & Rakim

Eric B. & Rakim singles chronology
"Eric B. Is President" (1986)	"I Ain't No Joke" (1987)	"I Know You Got Soul" (1987)

Audio sample
- file; help

Music video
- "I Ain't No Joke" on YouTube

"I Ain't No Joke" is a song by rap duo Eric B. & Rakim, released as the second single from their debut studio album Paid in Full. It peaked at number thirty-eight on the Hot R&B/Hip-Hop Singles & Tracks. Described as one of the album's "monumental singles", Michael Di Bella wrote in the All Music Guide to Rock that "Rakim grabs the listener by the throat and illustrates his mastery of the rhyming craft". A music video was made for it, featuring dancing from Flavor Flav of the group Public Enemy. The song was selected by Jay-Z for the NBA 2K13 soundtrack. It was also featured in the video game Saints Row, as well as in the soundtrack of MLB The Show 23.

== Background ==
Eric B and Rakim met in 1985, after Rakim responded to Eric B's search for "New York's top MC". In 1986 they released their debut single, "Eric B. Is President", on an independent label Zakia Records. Def Jam Recordings co-founder Russell Simmons found out about the duo and they were signed to Island Records. In early 1987 the duo started working on Paid in Full.

== Recording ==
According to Rakim, the duo spent a week working on Paid in Full, with "I Ain't No Joke" taking most of it, four days. In an interview with Spin magazine Rakim said that while writing the song he deliberately avoided using obscene language:

If you listen to the rhymes in "I Ain't No Joke", you know I was really thinkin' hard about that shit. Plus, what I was doin' was, like, I was makin' it real hard, but no curses or sum'n they wouldn't want to play all day, 'cause they got it in power rotation. So I was thinkin' of the hardest shit I could think of, but still sayin' sum'n that they could play all day. 'Cause that's the whole idea of the rhymes I write. I can get real crazy with rhymes, but they ain't gonna play it all day, and that's what's gonna get you paid: people constantly hearin' it on radio. I could make real stoopid [sic] shit that they'll only play on the weekend, then they'll have to bleep half the record out! But, you know, I ain't livin' like that. I'm gettin' paid, I wanna get paid.

"I Ain't No Joke" was produced by the duo using the samples from "Pass the Peas" by The J.B.'s and "Theme from the Planets" by Dexter Wansel. Like most of the album, "I Ain't No Joke" was recorded at Power Play Studios in Long Island City, Queens, New York City.

== Music video ==
Music video for "I Ain't No Joke" was directed by Vivien Goldman, a British journalist, writer, and musician, who also had experience in guerrilla filmmaking. The budget available to them was low, so she asked Eric B. and Rakim where they like to hang out, and chose it as the locations for the music video. The video features Rakim rapping in three locations: in front of a graffiti mural, on a playground with his friends, and outside of an electronics shop in Harlem, in front of a crowd, with Eric B. playing on turntables. The shots of these locations change constantly throughout the video. Both Eric B. and Rakim wear golden age era outfits, consisting of tracksuits and heavy gold chains and jewelry, and described by Complex magazine as "flamboyant" and "both classic and priceless". The video also features a cameo appearance from Flavor Flav of the group Public Enemy, and a cameo of "Chill Will", a DJ from the trio Doug E. Fresh and The Get Fresh Crew, dancing on the playground and in front of the crowd near the store.

== Track listing ==
Side A

1. "I Ain't No Joke" – 3:54
2. "Extended Beat" – 3:49

Side B

1. "Eric B. Is on the Cut" – 3:48

== Charts ==
Chart (1987)	Peak position
U.S. Billboard Hot R&B/Hip-Hop Songs	38
