= In the Ghetto (disambiguation) =

"In the Ghetto" is a song written by Mac Davis and popularized by Elvis Presley.

In the Ghetto may also refer to:

- In the Ghetto (Busta Rhymes song), the final single from Busta Rhymes' album, The Big Bang
- In the Ghetto (Eric B. & Rakim song), 1990
- "In the Ghetto", a song by E-40 from his 2012 album, The Block Brochure: Welcome to the Soil 1
- In the Ghetto (album), a reggae album by Maiko Zulu
- "In the Ghetto", a song by DJ Kay Slay and Greg Street from their 2006 album, The Champions: North Meets South

== See also ==
- "In de Ghetto", a 1994 song by David Morales & The Bad Yard Club featuring Crystal Walkers
  - "In da Getto", a 2021 song by J Balvin and Skrillex greatly adapting from the song above
