= NBA 2K13 =

2012 basketball video game

- Cover art featuring (from left to right) Blake Griffin, Kevin Durant, and Derrick Rose
- Developer: Visual Concepts
- Publisher: 2K
- Producer: Jay-Z
- Series: NBA 2K
- Platforms: Android iOS; Microsoft Windows; PlayStation 3 PlayStation Portable; Wii; Xbox 360; Wii U
- Release: NA: October 2, 2012; AU: October 5, 2012; EU: October 19, 2012; Wii U: NA: November 18, 2012; EU: December 14, 2012; AU: December 27, 2012
- Genre: Sports
- Modes: Single-player, multiplayer

NBA 2K13 is a 2012 basketball video game developed by Visual Concepts and published by 2K. It was released in October 2012 for Android, iOS, Microsoft Windows, PlayStation 3, PlayStation Portable, Wii and Xbox 360. A version for the Wii U was also released as a launch title in North America, and in December for the PAL region. Blake Griffin of the Los Angeles Clippers, Kevin Durant of the Oklahoma City Thunder, and Derrick Rose of the Chicago Bulls are the cover athletes, and they are all shown in dunking positions. NBA 2K13 is the successor to NBA 2K12, succeeded by NBA 2K14 in the NBA 2K series and is the fourteenth installment in the 2K series. The game was executive produced by rapper Jay-Z, who designed the game and curated its soundtrack. It is also the fourth and last NBA 2K game to be released on both the Wii and PlayStation Portable, the only installment available on the Wii U, and the last to be available on pure handheld systems.

== Development ==
Around mid-June 2012, 2K Sports announced a 'Uncover the Cover' where the more tweets #NBA2K13 got the more clues would be revealed about the cover athletes. 2K also announced NBA 2K13's compatibility with Kinect for the Xbox 360. Two of the legends from NBA 2K12 have been removed: Julius Erving and Kareem Abdul-Jabbar. On May 3, 2012, 2K Sports announced that as a bonus for pre-ordering the game, buyers would receive downloadable content for an All Star Weekend, which would feature the Slam Dunk Contest, Three Point Contest, Rising Stars Challenge, and the NBA All Star Game. Also a shoe creator was developed, with Nike, Jordan, Adidas, Spalding, Reebok, Converse, Under Armour, and generic shoes available to create and edit.

Rapper Jay-Z serves as executive producer of the game. He has been credited with the idea of having both the 1992 and 2012 United States men's national basketball teams in the game. Additionally, he appeared in an introduction, picked songs for the game's soundtrack and contributed to the design of its in-game menus "and other visual elements".

Initially, Scottie Pippen was left out of the game due to the inability to secure use of his likeness. However, after widespread disappointment from fans over his absence, he was then added to the team roster.

The soundtrack was announced in August 2012 including songs from Jay-Z and artists like Nas, Kanye West, and U2.

In 2013, 2K added NBA 2K13 Lite (in addition to the previously release NBA 2K13) to the iOS platform. This version of the NBA 2K series of games is free, and appears to be a cut down/demonstration version of the full NBA 2K13 iOS title.

On September 28, 2013, the Release updated the 2K13 and 2K14 versions from the Xbox 360, PS3, and PC.

Two days before the October 2nd release, 2K Sports announced via a reply to a fan on Twitter that the downloadable PC version was delayed to October 16. The release date on Amazon was subsequently changed to October 30. The game was also distributed as a limited disc-based release and was found to have been missing some key features from the console versions. Within 24 hours of going on sale, the game sold 9.5 million copies in the U.S. Online matchmaking with friends is unavailable and "Blacktop 3 vs 3", and "MyTEAMs" modes have been removed. The game's virtual currency system and the features associated with the currency system (such as unlockable Blacktop Stars and MyCLOSET) have not ported over from the console versions. In addition, advanced lighting features available on consoles, such as self-shadowing are also unavailable. Custom soundtracks and DLC (including pre-order DLC) have been excluded as well. The PC version can be modified with new player faces, arenas and courts, jerseys and tools which allow you to clone real NBA players into My Career mode.

== Soundtrack ==
NBA 2K13 earned critical acclaim for its soundtrack, curated by Jay-Z.

Gamecore via CBS wrote: "Jay-Z's contributions are unmistakable. The soundtrack is hands down the best hip-hop compilation in any sports game ever produced."

Billboard praised 2K for bringing "diverse artists to the game soundtrack, ranging from indie rock (Phoenix, Dirty Projectors) to electro (Daft Punk, Justice) to hip-hop, with classics such as Nas' "The World is Yours" and Eric B. and Rakim's "I Ain't No Joke" sharing time with a number of hits from [Jay-Z] himself.

Curated by Jay-Z

- Jay-Z – "Pump It Up" Freestyle
- Jay-Z – "The Bounce" featuring Kanye West
- Jay-Z – "Public Service Announcement"
- Jay-Z – "Run This Town" featuring Rihanna & Kanye West
- Jay-Z – "On to the Next One" featuring Swizz Beatz
- Jay-Z and Kanye West - "H.A.M." (instrumental)
- Kanye West – "Mercy" featuring Big Sean, Pusha T & 2 Chainz
- Kanye West – "Amazing" featuring Jeezy
- Kanye West – "We Major"
- U2 – "Elevation"
- Mobb Deep – "Shook Ones (Part II)"
- Santigold – "Shove It"
- Nas – "The World Is Yours"
- Puff Daddy – "Victory" featuring The Notorious B.I.G. & Busta Rhymes
- Dirty Projectors – "Stillness Is the Move"
- Phoenix – "1901"
- Justice – "Stress"
- Too $hort – "Blow the Whistle"
- The Hours – "Ali in the Jungle"
- Roy Ayers – "We Live in Brooklyn Baby"
- Eric B. & Rakim – "I Ain't No Joke"
- Coldplay – "Viva la Vida"
- Daft Punk – "Around the World"

== Reception ==
Reception

Aggregate score
Aggregator	Score
Metacritic	(PC) 90/100 (PS3) 90/100 (X360) 88/100 (WIIU) 85/100 (iOS) 64/100

Review scores
Publication	Score
Game Informer	8.75/10
GameRevolution	9/10
GameSpot	9/10
GamesRadar+	(X360) 3.5/5 (WIIU) 3/5
GameTrailers	9.1/10
Giant Bomb	4/5
IGN	9.1/10
Joystiq	7/10
Nintendo Life	(WIIU) 9/10
PC Gamer (US)	91/100

NBA 2K13 has received generally favorable reviews and has a Metacritic score of 88 out of 100. IGN gave it a 9.1 out of 10 and said that "Even when left with a clear, unobstructed path to the basket, 2K13 throws down a monster jam with this year's edition," and that "It's obviously the best hoops game out there, and it might even be the best sports game of all, period." GameSpot scored the game a 9 of 10 saying that "Enhanced realism and a great new control setup make NBA 2K13 a fantastic recreation of pro hoops." Game Revolution gave the game a 9 out of 10 and said that, "There is no doubt that NBA 2K13 is one for the ages. Without any other true competitors to stand in its way, the sky is the limit. If you haven't already picked up a copy, you are sorely missing out. I can't ever truly say if a game is worth $60, but with this one, it might be worth even more." GameTrailers gave it a 9.1 out of 10.

However, Joystiq and GamesRadar gave the game mixed reviews. Both publications lauded the game's on-court experience, while criticizing the game modes. Joystiq called the My Career and My Team modes "uninspired and lazy" while GamesRadar lamented the absence of the Jordan and Greatest challenges modes from previous installments.

During the 16th Annual D.I.C.E. Awards, the Academy of Interactive Arts & Sciences nominated NBA 2K13 for "Sports Game of the Year".
