= Lyrics of Fury =

Lyrics of Fury may refer to:

- "Lyrics of Fury", a song by Eric B. and Rakim from the 1988 album Follow the Leader
- Lyrics of Fury, a series of three compilation albums released by Battle Axe Records from 2001 to 2004
