= Classic (Eric B. & Rakim album) =

Compilation album by Eric B. & Rakim
- Released: April 22, 2003
- Recorded: 1986–1992
- Genre: Hip-hop
- Label: Universal Records
- Producer: Eric B.

Eric B. & Rakim chronology
The Best of Eric B. & Rakim (2001)	Classic (2003)	Gold (2005)

Professional ratings
Review scores
Source	Rating
AllMusic	4.5/5 stars

Classic is the second compilation and sixth album overall by hip hop duo Eric B. & Rakim, one of the titles of the European version of Universal Music Group’s Millennium Masters series. Despite being an Eric B. & Rakim album, the back cover featured Eric B. with Chuck D because of an editing error.

== Track listing ==
1. "Follow the Leader" (Eric B., Steve Griffin, Rakim) - 5:35
2. "Lyrics of Fury" (B., Griffin, Rakim) - 4:13
3. "Microphone Fiend" (B., Griffin, Rakim) - 5:15
4. "Let the Rhythm Hit 'Em" (B., Griffin, Rakim) - 5:25
5. "In the Ghetto" (B., Griffin, Rakim) - 5:27
6. "The Punisher" (B., Griffin, Rakim) - 4:08
7. "Know the Ledge" (Rakim) - 4:00
8. "I Know You Got Soul" (B., Charles Bobbit, James Brown, Bobby Byrd, Rakim) - 4:47
9. "Eric B. Is President" (B., Rakim) - 6:20
10. "I Ain't No Joke" (B., Rakim) - 3:55
11. "Paid in Full" (B., Rakim) - 3:49
12. "It's Been a Long Time" (B., Bobbit, Brown, Byrd, DJ Premier, Rakim) - 3:58
13. "Real Shit" (Ron Lawrence, Padilla, Rakim) - 4:21
14. "Flow Forever" (Davis, Clark Kent, Rakim) - 4:13
15. "I Know" (Hinds, Benny Latimore, Rakim, Randolph) - 4:09

== Personnel ==
- Eric B. – Producer
- DJ Premier – Producer, Mixing
- Richard Ganter – Compilation
- Robert Hill – Producer
- Clark Kent – Producer, Mixing
- Ron "Amen-Ra" Lawrence – Producer
- Rakim – Producer
- TR Love – Producer
- Patrick Adams - Engineer, Mixing
