= Don't Sweat the Technique (song) =

Single by Eric B. & Rakim

from the album Don't Sweat the Technique
- Released: June 27, 1992
- Studio: The Hit Factory (New York City)
- Genre: Jazz rap
- Label: MCA
- Songwriters: Eric B. & Rakim
- Producers: Eric B. & Rakim

Eric B. & Rakim singles chronology
| "Know the Ledge" (1992) | "Don't Sweat the Technique" (1992) | "Casualties of War" (1992) |

Music video
- "Don't Sweat the Technique" on YouTube

"Don't Sweat the Technique" is a song recorded by American hip hop duo Eric B. & Rakim, released on June 27, 1992 by MCA Records as the third single from their fourth and final album, Don't Sweat the Technique (1992). The song was both written and produced by the duo and contains a sample of "Give It Up" by Kool & the Gang. It appears on the video games Watch Dogs 2, Aggressive Inline and Fuser.

== Charts ==
| Chart (1992) | Peak position |
|---|---|
| UK Dance (Music Week) | 40 |
| UK Club Chart (Music Week) | 92 |
| US Hot R&B/Hip-Hop Songs (Billboard) | 14 |
| US Hot Rap Songs (Billboard) | 1 |
| US Dance Club Songs (Billboard) | 12 |
