= Benny Reid =

American songwriter

- Born: October 7, 1980 (age 44); Westfield, New Jersey, U.S.
- Genres: Jazz, HipHop, R&B
- Occupation: Musician
- Instrument: Saxophone
- Years active: 1995–present
- Labels: Concord, Fat Beats
- Website: www.bennyreid.com

Benny Reid (born October 7, 1980) is a jazz saxophonist, music producer, and composer.

Reid was born in Westfield, New Jersey, and his parents exposed him to the music of John Coltrane and Miles Davis. His high school teacher was Andy Fusco, saxophonist with the Buddy Rich band. Reid cited as his biggest saxophone influences Stan Getz, Joe Henderson, and Paul Desmond. In 2002, he graduated with a Bachelor of Music Jazz at Indiana University School of Music. In 2008 he graduated with a master's degree from Queens College. Reid also studied with Barry Harris, Eric Alexander, Mike LeDonne, Chris Potter, and Dick Oatts.

Reid's first album as leader, Findings, was released in 2007 by Concord Records. His second, Escaping Shadows, includes a cover version of "Always and Forever" by Pat Metheny.

Reid released Follow the Leader on Fat Beats, a reimagined work of the iconic Eric B. & Rakim album of the same name which went on to achieve number one status on two Billboard charts.

Reid is active composing and performing themes for national commercials and music in film and television.

Most recently Reid scored the Nas directed Showtime series Supreme Team alongside Havoc of Mobb Deep.
