= Golden age hip-hop =

Hip-hop music from around 1985–1995

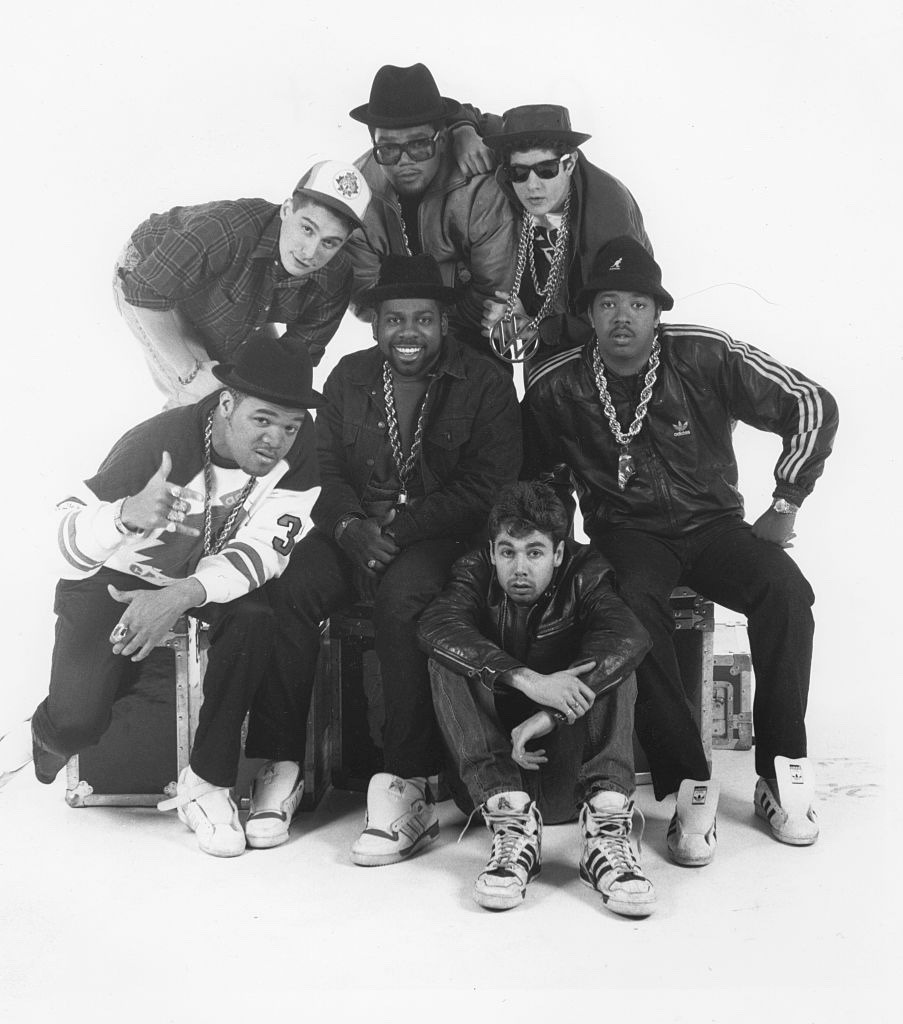
- Run-DMC and Beastie Boys (with DJ Hurricane) in 1987. Their albums are often considered a start to hip hop's golden era.
- Stylistic origins: Hip-hop; new-school hip-hop; East Coast hip-hop
- Cultural origins: Mid-to-late 1980s, The Bronx, New York City
- Typical instruments: Turntables; microphone; Roland TR-808; E-mu SP-1200
- Derivative forms: Jazz rap; Boom bap; Hardcore hip-hop; mafioso rap

Local scenes
- South Bronx, Queens, Brooklyn, Harlem, Long Island

Golden age hip-hop refers to hip-hop music created from roughly the late 1980s to the mid-1990s, building on the genre's advances of the mid-1980s. The golden age is characterized by its diversity, quality, innovation, and influence on overall hip-hop, and is associated with the genre's development and mainstream success. Subject matter was varied, while the music was experimental and the sampling eclectic.

The artists most associated with the period are LL Cool J, Slick Rick, Ultramagnetic MCs, the Jungle Brothers, Run-DMC, Public Enemy, Beastie Boys, KRS-One, DJ Jazzy Jeff & the Fresh Prince, Eric B. & Rakim, Kid 'n Play, De La Soul, Big Daddy Kane, EPMD, Biz Markie, Salt-N-Pepa, Queen Latifah, Gang Starr, and A Tribe Called Quest. These acts coexisted with early gangsta rap artists such as Schoolly D, Ice-T, Geto Boys, N.W.A, the sex raps of 2 Live Crew and Too Short, and party-oriented music by acts such as the Fat Boys, MC Hammer, and Vanilla Ice. Most of these artists and musicians originated from the New York metropolitan area.

== Characteristics ==
The golden age is noted for its innovation—a time "when it seemed that every new single reinvented the genre", according to Rolling Stone. Referring to "hip-hop in its golden age", Spin's editor-in-chief Sia Michel said, "there were so many important, groundbreaking albums coming out right about that time", and MTV's Sway Calloway added: "The thing that made that era so great is that nothing was contrived. Everything was still being discovered and everything was still innovative and new". Jelani Cobb wrote, "what made the era they inaugurated worthy of the term golden was the sheer number of stylistic innovations that came into existence... in these golden years, a critical mass of mic prodigies were literally creating themselves and their art form at the same time".

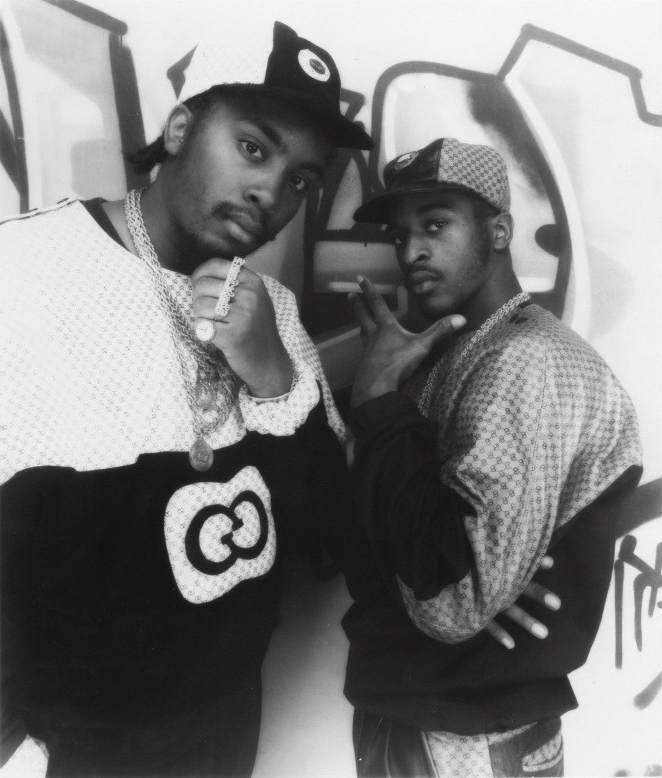
Eric B. & Rakim in 1987

The term golden age hip-hop frames the late 1980s in mainstream hip-hop, said to be characterized by its diversity, quality, innovation, and influence, and associated with Public Enemy, KRS-One and his Boogie Down Productions, Eric B. & Rakim, Ultramagnetic MCs, De La Soul, A Tribe Called Quest, and the Jungle Brothers with their themes of Afrocentricity and political militancy, experimental music, and eclectic sampling. This period is sometimes called "mid-school" or a "middle school" in hip-hop and covers acts such as Gang Starr, the UMC's, Main Source, Lord Finesse, EPMD, Just Ice, Stetsasonic, True Mathematics, and Mantronix.

The innovations of Run-DMC, LL Cool J, Beastie Boys, and new-school producers such as Larry Smith and Rick Rubin were built upon by Marley Marl and his Juice Crew MCs, Boogie Down Productions, Public Enemy, and Eric B. & Rakim. Hip-hop production became denser and rhymes and beats faster as the drum machine was augmented with sampler technology. Rakim took lyrics about the art of rapping to new heights, while KRS-One and Chuck D pushed "message rap" toward black activism. Native Tongues artists' inclusive, sample-crowded music accompanied their positivity, Afrocentricity, and playfulness.

Samples were heavily used during the golden age. The ability to sample beats, riffs, and patterns from a wide variety of sources birthed a new breed of producers and DJs who did not need formal musical training or instruments, just a good ear for sound collages. These samples came from various genres, ranging from jazz, funk and soul to rock and roll. For example, Paul's Boutique, Beastie Boys' second studio album, drew from over 200 individual samples, 24 of which were on the album's last track. Samples and sound bites were not limited to music. RZA of the Wu-Tang Clan, a hip-hop collective formed in the 1990s, sampled sound clips from his collection of 1970s kung-fu films to bolster and frame the group's gritty lyrical content. Many of these sample-laden albums released could not receive legal clearance today.

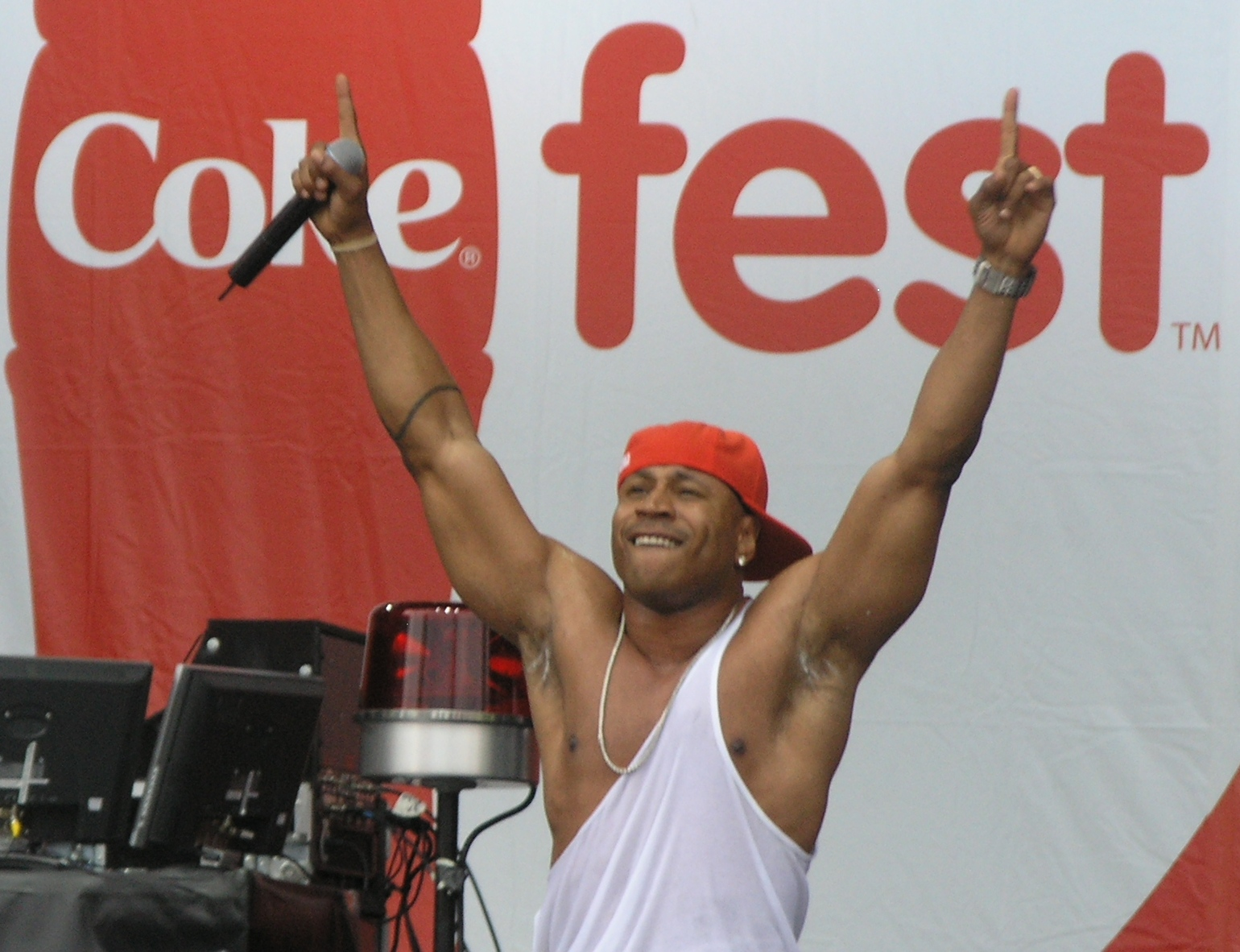
LL Cool J pictured in 2007. His second album Bigger and Deffer spent 11 weeks at number one on the Billboard Top R&B/Hip-Hop Albums chart in the summer of 1987.

The era also provided some of the greatest advances in rapping technique. Kool G Rap said of the golden age, "that era bred rappers like a Big Daddy Kane, a KRS-One, a Rakim, a Chuck D... their rapping capability and ability—these dudes were phenomenal". Many of hip-hop's biggest artists were also at their creative peak. AllMusic said the golden age "witnessed the best recordings from some of the biggest rappers in the genre's history... overwhelmingly based in New York City, golden age rap is characterized by skeletal beats, samples cribbed from hard rock or soul tracks, and tough dis raps... rhymers like PE's Chuck D, Big Daddy Kane, KRS-One, Rakim, and LL Cool J basically invented the complex wordplay and lyrical kung-fu of later hip-hop".

In addition to lyrical self-glorification, hip-hop was also used as a form of social protest. Lyrical content often drew attention to social issues, including Afrocentric living, drug use, crime and violence, religion, culture, the U.S. economy, and the modern man's struggle. Conscious and political hip-hop tracks were a response to the effects of U.S. capitalism and President Ronald Reagan's conservative political economy. According to Tricia Rose, "In rap, relationships between black cultural practice, social and economic conditions, technology, sexual and racial politics, and the institution policing of the popular terrain are complex and in constant motion. Even though hip-hop was used as a mechanism for different social issues it was still very complex with issues within the movement itself.

There was also often an emphasis on black nationalism. Hip-hop scholar Michael Eric Dyson wrote, "during the golden age of hip hop, from 1987 to 1993, Afrocentric and black nationalist rap were prominent", and critic Scott Thill wrote that during this period "the form most capably fused the militancy of its Black Panther and Watts Prophets forebears with the wide-open cultural experimentalism of De La Soul and others". Stylistic variety was also prominent; MSNBC wrote, "rappers had an individual sound that was dictated by their region and their communities, not by a marketing strategist," the Village Voice referred to the golden age's "eclecticism", and Ben Duinker and Denis Martin of Empirical Musicology Review wrote, "The constant flow of new, boundary-pushing Golden Age album releases exemplifies this era's unprecedented stylistic fluidity."

== Time period ==
The specific time period that the golden age covers varies among different sources and may overlap with other subcurrents in hip-hop. AllMusic writes, "Hip-hop's golden age is bookended by the commercial breakthrough of Run-D.M.C. in 1986 and the explosion of predominantly West Coast gangsta rap with N.W.A in the late 80s and Dr. Dre and Snoop Doggy Dogg in 1993." The New York Times described hip-hop's golden age as the "late 1980s and early 90s". Ed Simons of the Chemical Brothers said, "there was that golden age of hip-hop in the early 90s when the Jungle Brothers made Straight Out the Jungle and De La Soul made 3 Feet High and Rising" (though these records were in fact made in 1988 and 1989 respectively). MSNBC called the 1980s the "Golden Age" of hip-hop music. The Guardian states, "The golden age of hip-hop, from 1986 to 1993, gave the world an amazing number of great records," and also describes the period in November 1993, when A Tribe Called Quest and Wu-Tang Clan released albums, as "The Next Golden age."

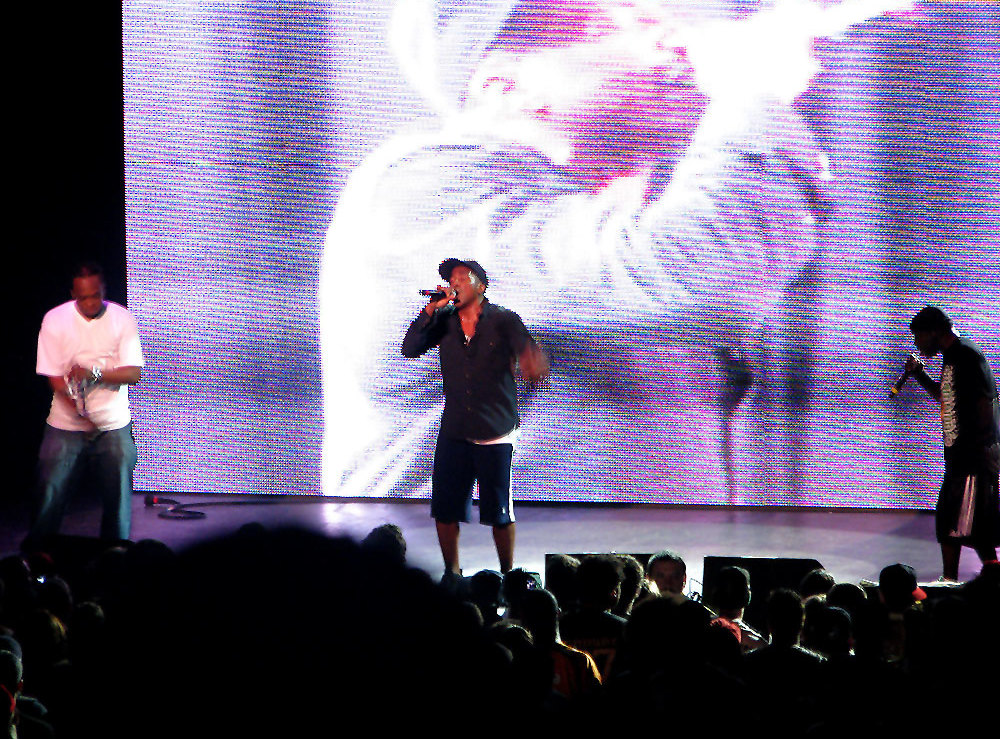
A Tribe Called Quest at a 2009 show

The golden age is described by scholar Mickey Hess as "circa 1986-1994." Carl Stoffers of New York Daily News describes the golden age as "spanning from approximately 1986 to 1997." Brad Callas of Medium.com writes that "Hip-Hop's Golden Age is loosely bookended by the genre's commercial breakthrough in the late 1980s and the back-to-back deaths of 2Pac and Biggie in the late 1990s." In their article "In Search of the Golden Age Hip-Hop Sound", music theorists Ben Duinker and Denis Martin of Empirical Musicology Review use "the 11 years between and including 1986 and 1996 as chronological boundaries" to define the golden age, bookended by the releases of Raising Hell and License to Ill [sic] and the deaths of Tupac Shakur and the Notorious B.I.G. Will Lavin of uDiscover Music states "It's generally accepted that the Golden Age occurred from the mid '80s [to] mid '90s; it was then that all the elements of the culture – breaking, graffiti art and DJing – broke cover to enter the mainstream."

Music critic Tony Green, in the book Classic Material, refers to the two-year period 1993–1994 as "a second Golden Age" that saw influential, high-quality albums using elements of past classicism – drum machines (Roland TR-808), drum samplers (Akai MPC60, E-mu SP-1200), turntable scratches, references to old-school hip-hop hits, and "tongue-twisting triplet verbalisms" – while making clear that new directions were being taken. Green lists as examples the Wu-Tang Clan's Enter the Wu-Tang (36 Chambers), Nas's Illmatic, De La Soul's 1993 release Buhloone Mindstate, Snoop Doggy Dogg's Doggystyle, A Tribe Called Quest's third album Midnight Marauders and Outkast's Southernplayalisticadillacmuzik. Dart Adams of Festival Peak described this "2nd Golden Era" as spanning 1992 to 1996, and cites the release of Puff Daddy and Mase's "Can't Nobody Hold Me Down" in 1997 as being the start of mainstream rap's "Jiggy Era".

According to copyright, music and pop culture scholars Kembrew Mcleod and Peter DiCola, the golden age of hip-hop sampling spans from 1987 to 1992. Artists and record labels were not yet aware of the permanence of hip-hop culture in mainstream media, and did not yet accept it as a legitimate institution. They believe the ruling made in Grand Upright Music, Ltd. v. Warner Bros. Records Inc. marked the end of the golden age of hip-hop and its sampling practices.

== Notable artists ==
=== Juice Crew ===
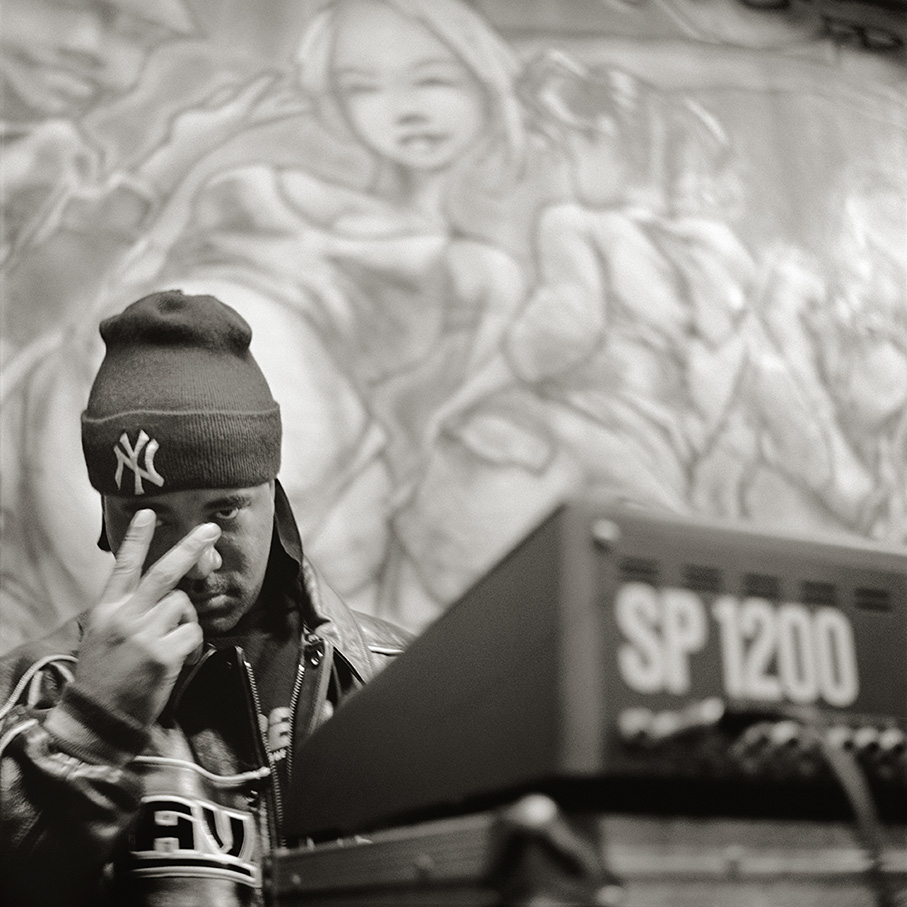
Marley Marl in Nottingham, England in 1999

Notable hip-hop producer and innovator, Marley Marl, formed the Juice Crew hip-hop collective. Marl also founded Cold Chillin' Records and assembled various acts, including MC Shan, Big Daddy Kane, Biz Markie, Roxanne Shanté, Kool G Rap & DJ Polo, and Masta Ace. His Juice Crew collective was an important force in ushering rap's golden age, with advances in lyrical technique, distinctive personalities of emerging artists like Biz Markie and Big Daddy Kane, and attaining crossover commercial success for hip-hop music. Marley Marl's first production was an "answer record" to "Sucker MCs" in 1983 entitled "Sucker DJs" by Dimples D. Soon after came 14-year-old Roxanne Shanté's answer to UTFO's "Roxanne Roxanne", "Roxanne's Revenge" (1985), sparking off the huge wave of answer records known as the Roxanne Wars. More disses (insults intended to show disrespect) from Shanté followed: "Bite This" (1985), "Queen of Rox" (1985), introducing Biz Markie on "Def Fresh Crew" (1986), "Payback" (1987), and "Have a Nice Day" (1987).

=== Boogie Down Productions ===
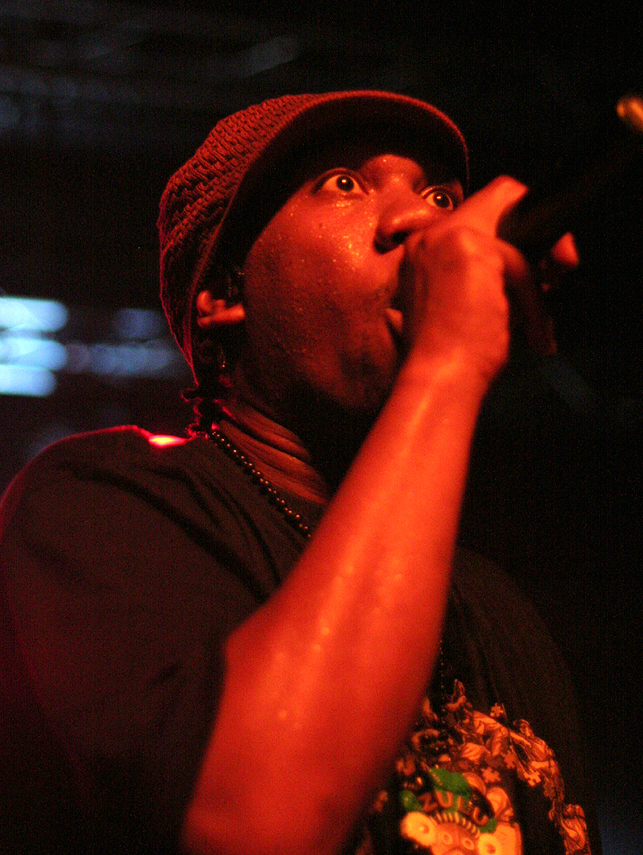
Boogie Down Productions' KRS-One exemplified the golden age's hardcore and political aesthetics.

Shante's "Have a Nice Day" had aimed some barbs at the principal two members of a new group from the Bronx called Boogie Down Productions (BDP): "Now KRS-One you should go on vacation with that name soundin' like a wack radio station, and as for Scott La Rock, you should be ashamed, when T La Rock said "It's Yours", he didn't mean his name". Boogie Down Productions had manufactured a disagreement with the Juice Crew's MC Shan, releasing "South Bronx" and "The Bridge Is Over" in reply to his "The Bridge" and "Kill That Noise" respectively. KRS-One considered Run-DMC the epitome of rap music in 1984 and had begun to rap following their lead. However, he has also said that BDP's approach reflected a feeling that the early innovators like Run-DMC and LL Cool J were by 1986 tainted by commercial success and out of touch with the streets.

Boogie Down's first album Criminal Minded (1987) contained a dancehall reggae influence and had KRS-One imitating the Beatles' "Hey Jude" on the title track. It also contained two tales of grim street life, yet played for callous laughs: "The P Is Free", in which KRS speaks of throwing out his girl who wants crack cocaine in exchange for sex, and "9mm Goes Bang", in which he shoots a drug dealer then cheerfully sings "la la la la la la". Songs like these presaged the rise of an underground that matched violent lyrics to the hardcore drum machine tracks of the new-school. The cover of Criminal Minded was a further reflection of a move towards this sort of radical image, depicting the group in a half-light, holding firearms. The next album By All Means Necessary (1988) left that element behind for political radicalism following the murder of Scott La Rock, with its title and cover alluding to Malcolm X. KRS-One became involved with the Stop the Violence Movement at this time. Boogie Down Productions, along with Run-DMC and Public Enemy, associated the new-school as rap music with a strong message.

=== Eric B. and Rakim ===
Eric B. & Rakim appeared with the Marley Marl produced "Eric B. Is President" and "My Melody" on Zakia Records in 1986. Both tracks appeared on Paid in Full (1987). Just as Boogie Down Productions had, the pair reflected changes in street life on their debut's cover, which depicted the two wearing large gold chains and surrounded by money. Like Criminal Minded, the sampling prevalent in the album cemented James Brown's status as a hip-hop source, while Rakim's allusions showed the growing influence of mystic Islam-offshoot The Nation of Gods and Earths in hip-hop. The music was minimalist, austerely so, with many writers noting that coupled with Rakim's precise, logical style, the effect was almost one of scientific rigour. The group followed Paid in Full with Follow the Leader (1988), Let the Rhythm Hit 'Em (1990) and Don't Sweat the Technique (1992).

Rakim is generally regarded as the most cutting-edge of the MCs of the golden age. Jess Harvell in Pitchfork in 2005 wrote that "Rakim's innovation was applying a patina of intellectual detachment to rap's most sacred cause: talking shit about how you're a better rapper than everyone else." Robert Christgau in the Village Voice in 1990 wrote of Rakim's style as "calm, confident, clear. On their third album, as on their phase-shifting 1986 debut," he continues, "Eric B.'s samples truly are beats, designed to accentuate the natural music of an idealized black man's voice." Looking back at the late 1980s in Rolling Stone in 1997, Ed Moralez describes Rakim as "the new-school MC of the moment, using a smooth baritone to become the jazz soloist of mystic Afrocentric rap."

=== Public Enemy ===
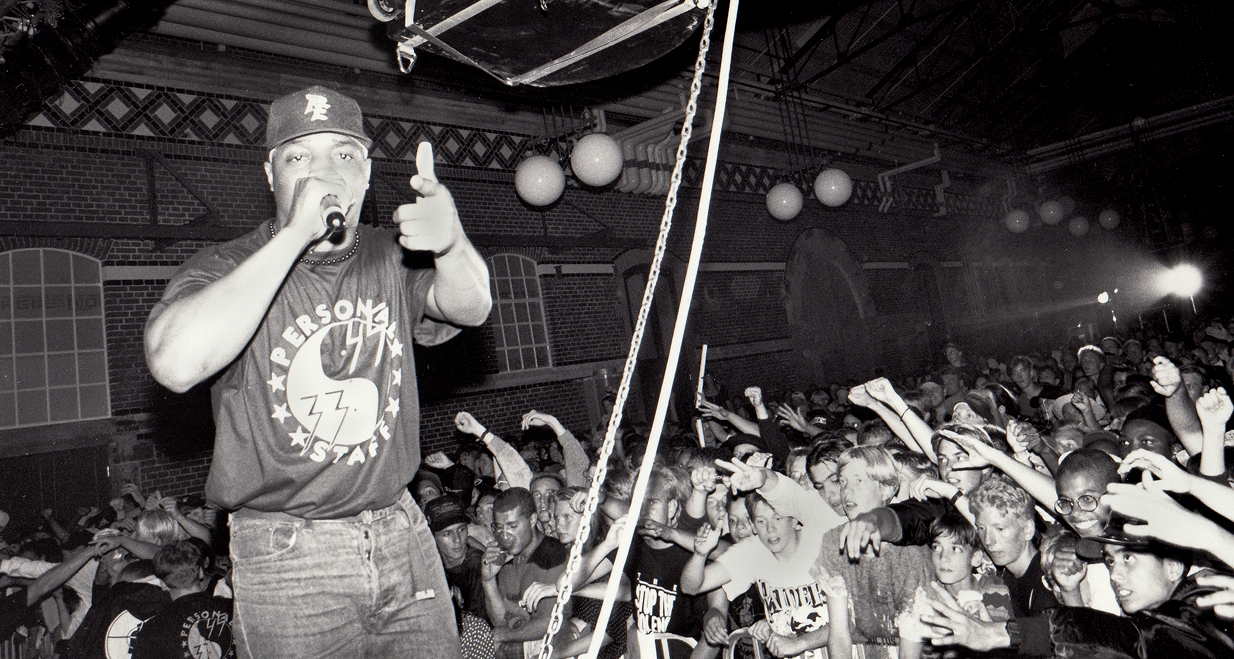
Chuck D of Public Enemy performing in 1991

Public Enemy, having been reluctantly convinced to sign to a record label, released Yo! Bum Rush the Show on Def Jam in 1987. It debuted the Public Enemy logo, a hatted b-boy in a sniper's crosshairs, and was replete with battle rhymes ("Miuzi Weighs a Ton", "Public Enemy #1"), social-political fare ("Rightstarter (Message to a Black Man)") and anti-crack messages ("Megablast"). The album was a critical and commercial success, particularly in Europe, unusually so for a hip-hop album at that time. Yo! Bum Rush the Show had been recorded on the heels of Run-DMC's Raising Hell, but was held back by Def Jam in order for them to concentrate on releasing and promoting the Beastie Boys' Licensed to Ill. Chuck D of Public Enemy felt that by the time their first record was released, Boogie Down Productions and Rakim had already changed the landscape for how an MC could rap. Public Enemy were already recording their second album It Takes a Nation of Millions to Hold Us Back (1988) when Bum Rush the Show hit stores.

=== Gangsta rap ===
The underground sound centered on urban violence, that was to become gangsta rap, first developed on the East Coast. Philadelphia's Schoolly D self-released "Gangsta Boogie" in 1984, and "P.S.K. What Does It Mean?"/"Gucci Time" in 1985, leading to Saturday Night (Schoolly D, 1986, Jive, 1987). The West Coast, which soon became the home of gangsta rap, had Toddy Tee's influential Batteram mixtape in 1985, and Ice-T's "Six in the Morning" in 1986 before N.W.A's first records, leading to the hugely successful Straight Outta Compton in 1989.

=== Native Tongues ===
Developments in New York hip-hop were represented by the Native Tongues groups—the Jungle Brothers, De La Soul, A Tribe Called Quest, Queen Latifah, Chi-Ali, and Monie Love—along with fellow travellers like Leaders of the New School, KMD, and Brand Nubian. Their music focused on positive lyricism and Afrocentricity, in contrast to the aggressive, macho posturing of gangsta rap. De La Soul's debut sampled artists from the Turtles to Steely Dan, while A Tribe Called Quest matched tough beats to mellow jazz samples and playful, thoughtful raps.

== Legal cases ==
=== Grand Upright Music, Ltd. v. Warner Bros. Records Inc. ===
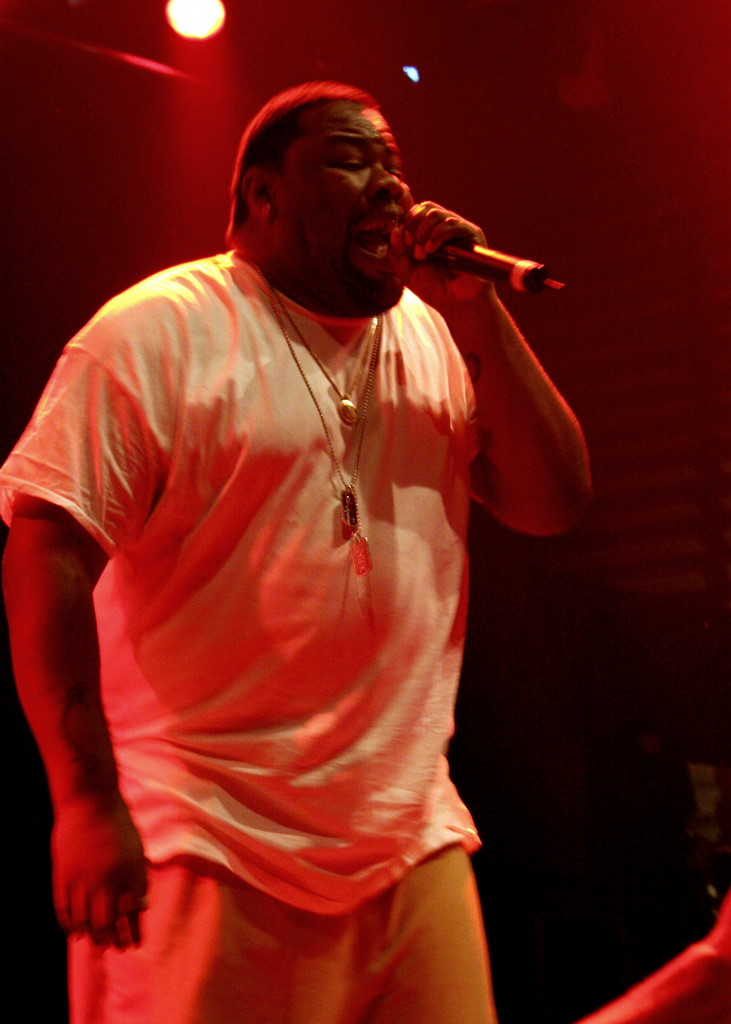
Biz Markie in 2007

This lawsuit was known for effectively ending the "Wild West" period for sampling during the golden age of hip-hop. In 1991, Gilbert O'Sullivan's song publisher sued Warner Brothers Records over the use of the original in Biz Markie's song "Alone Again." No copyright case precedents were cited in the ruling of the final verdict, and the presiding judge's opinion was prefaced with the words "Thou Shalt not Steal."

=== The Turtles v. De La Soul ===
1960s pop band the Turtles filed a lawsuit in 1989 against hip-hop group De La Soul for the uncleared use of a sampled element derived from their original 1968 track "You Showed Me." The lawsuit was settled out of court for a reported $1.7 million, though group members later claimed that the actual payout was significantly less.

== See also ==
- Album era
- Progressive rap
- New-school hip-hop
- Boom bap
