= Carl Stoffers =

American writer, editor, reporter, and law enforcement officer

Carl E. Stoffers III (born October 18, 1985) is an American writer, editor, reporter, and former law enforcement officer.

== Early life and education ==
Stoffers was born in Livingston, New Jersey. He was raised primarily in Westfield, New Jersey, where he resided with his paternal grandparents. Stoffers graduated from Westfield High School. He attended Union County College in Cranford, New Jersey. After moving to Phoenix, Arizona, in his late twenties, Stoffers was hired by the Arizona Department of Corrections and spent several years as a correctional officer at ASPC-Lewis.

Stoffers graduated summa cum laude from Kean University in Union, New Jersey, in 2014 with a bachelor's degree in communication. He graduated with honors from the Columbia University Graduate School of Journalism in 2015.

== Career ==
Stoffers completed a post-graduate fellowship at The Marshall Project before being hired by the New York Daily News, where wrote about hip hop's "Golden Era" and the "Blackhawk Down" Battle of Mogadishu. His work has also been published in the Asbury Park Press, Bleacher Report, the Courier News, the Home News Tribune, The Independent, Newsweek, Vice, The Wall Street Journal, and other publications.

In June 2015, he was publicly criticized by Piper Kerman, author of the book-turned TV-series Orange is the New Black over a story he wrote that fact checked the show's premier against his personal experiences as a correctional officer. Based on his journalist and former correctional officer background, he was asked to speak at Princeton University's S.P.E.A.R. (Students for Prison Education and Reform) Conference in 2015. He lectured on how to overcome the police subculture and bring reform to the criminal justice system.

Stoffers was named associate editor of The New York Times Upfront in 2016. He has been an adjunct faculty member at the Kean University School of Communication, Media, and Journalism since 2017. Stoffers was the managing editor of IPVM, an investigative journalism outlet devoted to video surveillance, from 2021-2023.

In 2023, Stoffers was named Senior Business Editor at Entrepreneur Magazine, covering the franchise industry. Since beginning his tenure at Entrepreneur, he has interviewed major business figures, including Peter Cancro, founder of Jersey Mike's Subs, Dunkin' President Scott Murphy, and senior leadership of Taco Bell and Yum! Brands. Stoffers has also interviewed former pro athletes like Todd Stottlemyre and Drew Brees

At Entrepreneur, Stoffers also edits several industry leaders via the Entrepreneur Leadership Network, including Matt Haller, President of the International Franchise Association, Greg Flynn of the Flynn Group, Ray Titus, CEO of United Franchise Group, Gigi Schweikert, Founder and CEO of Lightbridge Academy, and Jeff Brazier, Chief Development Officer at Kiddie Academy

In September 2025, Stoffers launched a Substack newsletter, The Pitching Coach. Billed as "Pitching advice from the other side of the inbox," the publication quickly grew to more than 1,100 subscribers.

In early 2026, Stoffers was named the Editorial Director for the soon-to-be resurrected magazine, The Saturday Review. In that capacity, he edits writers like Ed Begley, Jr., Jamie Metzl, Ned Rifkin, and others
