= Follow the Leader (Eric B. & Rakim song) =

1988 single by Eric B. & Rakim

Single by Eric B. & Rakim

from the album Follow the Leader
- B-side: "Just a Beat"
- Released: July 16, 1988
- Genre: Hip hop
- Length: 4:19 (video version); 5:36 (album version)
- Label: MCA
- Songwriters: Eric Barrier; William Griffin
- Producers: Eric B. & Rakim

Eric B. & Rakim singles chronology
"Paid in Full" (1987)	"Follow the Leader" (1988)	"The R" (1989)

Music video
- "Follow the Leader" on YouTube

"Follow the Leader" is a song by American hip-hop duo Eric B. & Rakim. It was written by group members Eric Barrier and Rakim Allah and released as the first single from their second studio album of the same name.

== Composition and lyrics ==
In contrast to their debut studio album, Paid in Full (1987), both Follow the Leader and its title track saw the duo updating their sound and departing from the minimalism of their debut, both production-wise and lyrically. "Follow the Leader" has been described as a "space-age" track, featuring a "pulsing bass line" and an "almost-ambient use of samples." Samples used in the song include "Nautilus" by jazz musician Bob James, "Listen to Me" by funk musician Baby Huey, and "I Wouldn't Change a Thing" by percussionist Coke Escovedo.

== Critical reception ==
The song received acclaim from music critics, and is generally regarded as one of the duo's most influential songs. In his book Icons of Hip Hop: An Encyclopedia of the Movement, Music, and Culture, Mickey Hess describes the song as an "event horizon that defined the stock in trade of the rap soloist." Melody Maker magazine placed the song at number 11 on their list of the top singles of 1988. Damien Morgan writes that Rakim's wordplay "showcases his lyrical prowess, as he takes the listener on a metaphorical voyage into outer space." Craig Hansen Werner wrote of the song: "When rap seemed to be settling into the interminable ego duels between LL Cool J and Kool Moe Dee, Eric B and Rakim's 'Follow the Leader' reminded the community of rap's visionary possibilities." Spin magazine cited "Follow the Leader" as an example of a hip hop song where "ingenuity, obsession and daring clash head on, spewing words and grammar in every direction."

== Music video ==
The song's music video was directed by Scott Kalvert and premiered on the August 6, 1988 pilot episode of television music program Yo! MTV Raps. Described as the "first rap video epic and period piece of the new televised world of hip hop", the video featured Rakim as a mob boss in a variety of situations—including getting a shave, sparing a fellow gangster's life and engaging in phone calls with other mob bosses. Scenes from the video are inspired by the 1987 crime drama The Untouchables.

== Charts ==
Chart (1988)	Peak position
Netherlands (Single Top 100)	75
UK Singles (OCC)	21
US Dance Club Songs (Billboard)	11
US Hot R&B/Hip-Hop Songs (Billboard)	16
