= I Know You Got Soul (Eric B. & Rakim song) =

- Side A of the US 12-inch vinyl

Single by Eric B. & Rakim

from the album Paid in Full
- Released: 1987
- Recorded: 1987
- Genre: Hip hop
- Length: 4:46
- Label: 4th & B'way
- Songwriters: Eric Barrier; Rakim Allah
- Producers: Eric Barrier; Rakim Allah

Eric B. & Rakim singles chronology
"I Ain't No Joke" (1987)	"I Know You Got Soul" (1987)	"Move the Crowd" (1987)

Alternative cover
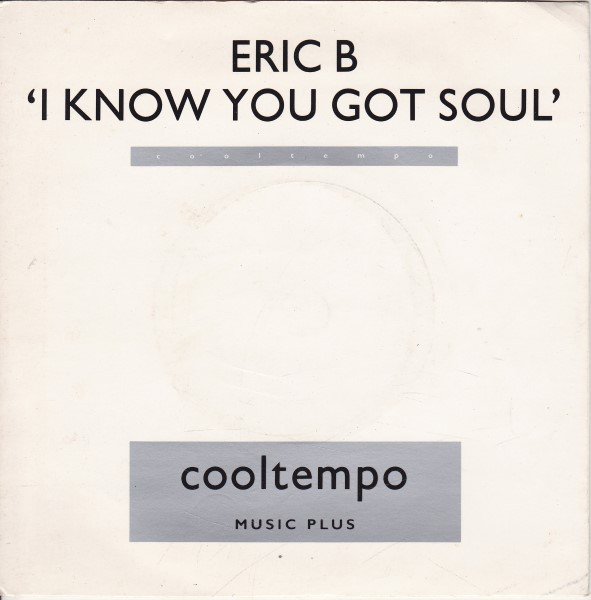
- Sleeve of the UK 7-inch vinyl

"I Know You Got Soul" is a song recorded by Eric B. & Rakim in 1987. A commercial and artistic success, it was ranked #23 by Rolling Stone on their list of Top 50 hip-hop songs, and #396 on their list of 500 Greatest Songs of All Time.

== Description and release ==
The song takes its name from a 1971 song of the same title recorded by Bobby Byrd, which it samples heavily, and is frequently credited with popularizing the use of James Brown samples in hip hop songs. It also samples the Ben Powers Jr. drum intro from the song "You'll Like It Too" released on LAX Records under the name Funkadelic.

It was released as the third single from their 1987 album Paid in Full. It peaked at number 39 on the Hot Dance Music/Club Play chart, number 34 on the Hot Dance Music/Maxi-Singles Sales, and number 64 on the Hot R&B/Hip-Hop Singles & Tracks chart. The track's production contains "digitized cymbal crashes, breathing sounds, and a bumping bass line."

The song is featured on the fictional radio station Playback FM in the video game Grand Theft Auto: San Andreas.

The British band M|A|R|R|S sampled the title lyric of their hit single "Pump Up the Volume" from the a cappella version of "I Know You Got Soul". The song was also sampled in the song "International Affair" by Sean Paul featuring Debi Nova. Timbaland quotes the opening line "It's been a long time, I shouldn't have left you without a strong rhyme ["dope beat", in the Timbaland version] to step to," in the Aaliyah song "Try Again". Timbaland covers the whole first verse in his later song "Cop That Shit", with lyrical changes. Part of the first verse is also spoken by Mos Def on his song "Love" off of his debut album, Black on Both Sides. D'Angelo references the lyrics to the song on "Chicken Grease" from his second album Voodoo.

== Accolades ==
The song ranked number 6 among "Tracks of the Year" for 1987 in the annual NME critics' poll.

Rolling Stone magazine ranked the song #23 on its list of "The 50 Greatest Hip-Hop Songs of All Time."

The song ranks #396 in Rolling Stone's 2004 list of the 500 Greatest Songs of All-Time.

== Charts ==
Chart (1987)	Peak position
UK Singles (OCC)	76
US Billboard Hot Dance Club Play	39
US Billboard Hot Dance Music/Maxi-Singles Sales	34
US Billboard Hot R&B/Hip-Hop Songs	64
Chart (1988)	Peak position
UK Singles (OCC)	13
