= Know the Ledge =

Single by Eric B. & Rakim

from the album Don't Sweat the Technique and Juice (soundtrack)
- Released: February 1992
- Recorded: 1991
- Studio: The Hit Factory (New York City)
- Genre: Hardcore hip hop
- Length: 4:00
- Label: MCA
- Songwriter: Rakim
- Producers: Rakim; The Bomb Squad (uncredited)

Eric B. & Rakim singles chronology
"What's on Your Mind" (1992)	"Know the Ledge" (1992)	"Don't Sweat the Technique" (1992)

Music video
- "Know the Ledge" on YouTube

"Know the Ledge" – originally on the soundtrack of the film Juice as "Juice (Know the Ledge)" – is a 1992 single by hip-hop duo Eric B. & Rakim. The film's theme song, also released on the duo's 1992 album Don't Sweat the Technique, it features a distinctive sample from Nat Adderley's 1968 hit "Rise, Sally, Rise".

"Know the Ledge" showcases Rakim's storytelling ability, sharing a first-person narrative of a neighborhood thug and drug dealer forced to come to grips with his violent and reckless lifestyle. Among Eric B. & Rakim's final hits as a duo, it was one of the most successful singles from the Juice soundtrack.

50 Cent told NME that the song was the one that made him want to be a rapper: "They were painting a picture of where I lived and all the moves you needed to make in order to live on the streets there. It was the law of the jungle out there."

== Background ==
The rapper played a more active role in the song than usual:

"They let me go up in a little room and see the movie. It was funny: I was living in Manhattan, downtown on 19th street. So when I got to the crib, me and wifey, she knew I was zoning in the cab. When I got to the crib, I had my studio in a little room. I went straight up into the room and found the sample. The bass line. I took the bass line and put the regular drum sample underneath that shit. Half an hour later I had the lights off because I was in there zoning. Wifey came in; I was like, 'Turn the lights off and close the door back.' About an hour later, I came out of there with three verses, man. It was crazy."

Rakim also played live drums on the track.

== Music video ==
The black-and-white video features Rakim rapping in the streets of Harlem, with scenes from Juice intercut.

== Samples ==
- The main bass line is sampled from "Rise, Sally Rise" by Nat Adderley, from his 1968 release The Scavenger

== Sampling and other references ==
- The lyric "I guess I didn't know..." (from the last line of the last verse) is sampled in the 1997 song "Busy Child" by The Crystal Method.
- Promoe, a Swedish rapper, refers to the title in the chorus of Spanish rapper Zatu's song "Al Filo", released in his album Odisea en el Lodo (2001).

== In popular media ==
The song has been featured in...

- ...the movie Fish Tank, when Mia is dancing in a deserted flat.
- ...the third season of Prison Break, in the episode "Dirt Nap", when Sammy is shadow boxing in his room to prepare for a fight.
- ...the American Dad! episode "Don't Look a Smith Horse in the Mouth", during the SUV Dramatization.
- ...promos for the television series Archer.
- ...the video game EA Skate.
- ...the DC Shoes 2003 DC video.
- ...the film High Fidelity, during a fantasy confrontation between the characters played by John Cusack and Tim Robbins.
- ...the video game BMX XXX.
- ...the video game Mat Hoffman's Pro BMX 2.
- ...the video game NBA 2K18

== Charts ==
Chart (1992)	Peak position
US Billboard Hot 100	96
US Hot R&B/Hip-Hop Songs (Billboard)	38
US Hot Rap Songs (Billboard)	7
US R&B/Hip-Hop Airplay (Billboard)	51
