= Let the Rhythm Hit 'Em =

Let the Rhythm Hit ’Em

Studio album by Eric B & Rakim
- Released: June 19, 1990
- Recorded: 1989–1990
- Studios: Power Play Studios, Long Island City, New York; Libra Digital Sound, Long Island City, New York; Skip Saylor Recording, Los Angeles, California; A&M Studios, Hollywood, California
- Genres: East Coast hip hop; golden age hip hop; hardcore hip hop; conscious rap
- Length: 54:16
- Label: MCA
- Producers: Eric B. (exec.); DJ Mark the 45 King (uncredited); Large Professor (uncredited); Paul C (uncredited); Rakim

Eric B & Rakim chronology
| Follow The Leader (1988) | Let the Rhythm Hit ’Em (1990) | Don't Sweat the Technique (1992) |

Singles from Let the Rhythm Hit 'Em
- 1. "Let the Rhythm Hit 'Em" Released: 1990; 2. "In the Ghetto" Released: 1990; 3. "Mahogany" Released: 1990

Professional ratings
Review scores
| Source | Rating |
|---|---|
| AllMusic | 3/5 stars |
| Christgau's Consumer Guide | A− |
| Entertainment Weekly | B− |
| Los Angeles Times | 4/5 stars |
| Rolling Stone | 3.5/5 stars |
| The Rolling Stone Album Guide | 4/5 stars |
| Select | 3/5 medals |
| The Source | 5/5 |
| Tom Hull – on the Web | B+ |

Let the Rhythm Hit ’Em is the third studio album by hip hop duo Eric B. & Rakim, released on June 19, 1990. The production ranges from soulful tracks such as "In the Ghetto" to the hard-edged assault of the title track "Let the Rhythm Hit ’Em."

The back cover features a dedication to the memories of Rakim's father William and producer Paul C., who had worked on many of the album's tracks before his murder in July 1989. Paul's protégé, Large Professor, completed his work; however, neither receive credit in the album's notes.

== Production credits ==
Much like past Eric B. & Rakim albums, production was credited to the duo. For this album however, production was supposed to be handled by Producer Paul C. Because of his murder in 1989, his protégé, Large Professor (still an unknown beatmaker from Queens who was still in high school) was called upon to complete the album's beats. Large Professor confirmed that Paul produced the songs "Run for Cover" and "Untouchables" in full. Regarding his contributions, Large Professor confirmed that he did all of "In the Ghetto" (based around a sample Paul had given him) and "Step Back" as well as the drum programming for "No Omega" and co-production on the title track. The rest of the production is assumed to have been handled by Rakim, his brother Stevie Blass Griffin and the album's engineer, Patrick Adams. Rakim confirmed that Paul C. also produced "Keep 'Em Eager to Listen" and "Set 'Em Straight". Rakim produced "No Omega" based on a sample that Paul had given him. The bonus track on the CD version, a remix of the title track, was produced by DJ Mark the 45 King, who had previously done some beats for Eric B. & Rakim's second album, Follow the Leader. Because of his involvement in the production, Large Professor was chosen by Eric B as a ghost producer for Kool G Rap & DJ Polo's second album, Wanted: Dead or Alive.

== Singles ==
Three singles were released from the album. The first single "Let the Rhythm Hit Em" charted at No. 23 and No. 2 on the Hot R&B/Hip-Hop Songs and Hot Rap Songs, making it the most successful single of the three. The official music video for "Let the Rhythm Hit 'Em" was directed by Julien Temple. The second single "In the Ghetto" charted at No. 82 and No. 10 on the Hot R&B/Hip-Hop Songs and Hot Rap Songs. The official music video for "In the Ghetto" was directed by David Hogan. The third and final single "Mahogany" did not chart on the Hot R&B/Hip-Hop Songs, but it charted on the Hot Rap Songs at No. 28.

== Critical reception ==
Let the Rhythm Hit 'Em received positive to mixed reviews from critics. Despite the fact that it did not produce any hit singles as popular as the duo's previous albums, it is considered by many to be their most coherent album, and is one of only a few rap albums that have received a 5-mic rating when it was reviewed in The Source. In 1998, the album was selected as one of The Source's 100 Best Rap Albums.

== Track listing ==
| No. | Title | Writer(s) | Producer(s) | Length |
|---|---|---|---|---|
| 1. | "Let the Rhythm Hit 'Em" | William Griffin, Jr.; Eric Barrier | Eric B.; Rakim | 5:30 |
| 2. | "No Omega" | Griffin; Barrier | Eric B.; Rakim | 4:45 |
| 3. | "In the Ghetto" | Griffin; Barrier | Eric B.; Rakim | 5:22 |
| 4. | "Step Back" | Griffin; Barrier | Eric B.; Rakim | 4:24 |
| 5. | "Eric B. Made My Day" (instrumental, "Eric B. Is on the Cut" Part 3) | Griffin; Barrier | Eric B.; Rakim | 5:05 |
| 6. | "Run for Cover" | Griffin; Barrier | Eric B.; Rakim | 4:46 |
| 7. | "Untouchables" | Griffin; Barrier | Eric B.; Rakim | 4:15 |
| 8. | "Mahogany" | Griffin; Barrier | Eric B.; Rakim | 4:41 |
| 9. | "Keep 'Em Eager to Listen" | Griffin; Barrier | Eric B.; Rakim | 4:40 |
| 10. | "Set 'Em Straight" | Griffin; Barrier | Eric B.; Rakim | 4:25 |

CD bonus track
| No. | Title | Writer(s) | Producer(s) | Length |
|---|---|---|---|---|
| 11. | "Let the Rhythm Hit 'Em" (12" Vocal Version Remix) | William Griffin, Jr.; Eric Barrier | DJ Mark the 45 King | 6:23 |

== Personnel ==
Credits for Follow the Leader adapted from AllMusic.

- DJ Mark the 45 King - Remixing
- Tony A. - Engineer
- Patrick Adams - Engineer
- Carlton Batts - Mastering
- Kevin Crouse - Assistant Engineer
- Eric Barrier - Primary Artist, Producer, Composer
- Carol Friedman - Art Direction
- P. Tony - Engineer
- Anton Pukshansky - Engineer
- William Griffin - Primary Artist, Producer, Composer
- Patrick Roques - Design
- Brian Scheuble - Engineer
- Ralph Sutton - Engineer
- Randy Wine - Assistant Engineer

== In popular culture ==
A remix of the first single and title track "Let the Rhythm Hit 'Em'" appeared in the 2007 football video game All-Pro Football 2K8. This remixed version, known as "Let the Rhythm Hit 'Em 2007" is shorted and uses a modified version of the instrumental to "Open/Point #1" by Chevelle as the backing track.

== Charts ==
=== Weekly charts ===
| Chart (1990) | Peak position |
|---|---|
| US Billboard 200 | 32 |
| US Top R&B/Hip-Hop Albums (Billboard) | 10 |

=== Year-end charts ===
| Chart (1990) | Position |
|---|---|
| US Top R&B/Hip-Hop Albums (Billboard) | 58 |

== Certifications ==
| Region | Certification | Certified units/sales |
|---|---|---|
| United States (RIAA) | Gold | 500,000^{^} |
^{^} Shipments figures based on certification alone.
