= Paid in Full (album) =

Studio album by Eric B. & Rakim
- Released: July 7, 1987
- Recorded: 1986–1987
- Studios: Marley Marl's home studio (Chestnut Ridge, New York); Power Play Studios (Queens, New York)
- Genre: Golden age hip-hop
- Length: 45:08
- Labels: 4th & B'way; Island
- Producers: Eric B. & Rakim

Eric B. & Rakim chronology
Paid in Full (1987)	Follow the Leader (1988)

Singles from Paid in Full
- 1. "Eric B. Is President" Released: 1986; 2. "I Ain't No Joke" Released: 1987; 3. "I Know You Got Soul" Released: 1987; 4. "Move the Crowd" Released: 1987; 5. "Paid in Full" Released: 1987

Paid in Full is the debut studio album by American hip hop duo Eric B. & Rakim, released on July 7, 1987, by Island-subsidiary label 4th & B'way Records. The duo recorded the album at hip-hop producer Marley Marl's home studio and Power Play Studios in New York City, following Rakim's response to Eric B.'s search for a rapper to complement his disc jockey work in 1985. The album peaked at No. 58 on the Billboard 200 chart, No. 8 on the R&B/Hip-Hop Albums chart, and produced five singles: "Eric B. Is President", "I Ain't No Joke", "I Know You Got Soul", "Move the Crowd", and "Paid in Full".

Paid in Full is credited as a benchmark album of golden age hip-hop. Rakim's rapping, which pioneered the use of internal rhymes in hip-hop, set a higher standard of lyricism in the genre and served as a template for future rappers. The album's heavy sampling by Eric B. became influential in hip-hop production. The record has sold over a million copies and the Recording Industry Association of America (RIAA) certified it platinum in 1995. In 2020, the album was ranked number 61 on Rolling Stone magazine's list of the "500 Greatest Albums of All Time".

== Background ==
Eric B. and Rakim met in 1985 after Eric B. looked for a rapper to complement his turntable work at the New York City radio station WBLS. After Rakim responded to Eric B.'s search for "New York's top MC", Eric B.'s friend and roommate Marley Marl allowed him to use his home studio. The first track they recorded, "Eric B. Is President", was released as a single on the independent Zakia Records in 1986. After Def Jam Recordings founder Russell Simmons heard the single, the duo were signed to Island Records and began recording the album in Manhattan's Power Play Studios in early 1987. Rakim wrote his songs in approximately one hour while listening to the beat. He then recorded his vocals in the booth by reading his lyrics from a paper. In 2006, Rakim revealed, "When I hear my first album today I hear myself reading my rhymes but I'm my worst critic." The duo completed the album in one week. They have said that they worked in 48-hour shifts and recorded in single takes to complete the album within budget. In a 2008 interview with AllHipHop, Eric B. stated, "[T]o sit here and say we put together this calculated album to be a great album would be a lie. We were just doing records that felt good."

The album's success led to a contract with Uni Records and MCA Records, where they released their second album, Follow the Leader (1988). Eric B. and Rakim are credited as officially producing Paid in Full. Although Marley Marl claimed to have produced two tracks ("My Melody" and "Eric B. Is President"), Eric B. has argued that Marley Marl was only an engineer. In 2003, Eric B. alleged the duo had not been paid in full for their work, and filed a lawsuit against the Island Def Jam Music Group, Lyor Cohen, and Russell Simmons.

The album cover featured a photo of Eric B. and Rakim wearing custom-made Gucci "knock-ups" by Harlem tailor Dapper Dan.

== Music ==
Rakim's rhyming deviated from the simple rhyme patterns of early 1980s hip-hop. His free-rhythm style ignored bar lines and had earned comparisons to Thelonious Monk. The New York Times' Ben Ratliff wrote that Rakim's "unblustery rapping developed the form beyond the flat-footed rhythms of schoolyard rhymes". While many rappers developed their technique through improvisation, Rakim was one of the first to demonstrate advantages of a writerly style, as with for instance his pioneering use of internal rhyme. Unlike previous rappers such as LL Cool J and Run-DMC who delivered their vocals with high energy, Rakim employed a relaxed, stoic delivery. According to MTV, "We'd been used to MCs like Run and DMC, Chuck D and KRS-One leaping on the mic shouting with energy and irreverence, but Rakim took a methodical approach to his microphone fiending. He had a slow flow, and every line was blunt, mesmeric." Rakim's relaxed delivery resulted from his jazz influences; he had played the saxophone and was a John Coltrane fan. His subject matter often covered his own rapping skills and lyrical superiority over other rappers.

AllMusic editor Steve Huey characterized Rakim for his "complex internal rhymes, literate imagery, velvet-smooth flow, and unpredictable, off-the-beat rhythms." Pitchfork writer Jess Harvell described his rapping as "authoritative, burnished, [and] possessing an unflappable sense of rhythm". Paid in Full, which contains gritty, heavy, and dark beats, marked the beginning of heavy sampling in hip-hop records. Of the album's ten tracks, three are instrumentals. As a disc jockey, Eric B. had reinstated the art of live turntable mixing. His soul-filled sampling became influential in future hip-hop production. Music critic Robert Christgau noted that Eric B. had incorporated "touches of horn or whistle deep in the mix" of his sampled percussion and scratches.

== Singles ==
"Eric B. Is President" was released as the first single with "My Melody" as the B-side. It peaked at number 48 on the Hot R&B/Hip-Hop Singles & Tracks and number forty on the Hot Dance Music/Maxi-Singles Sales. The track sparked debate on the legality of unauthorized sampling when James Brown sued to prevent the duo's use of his music. PopMatters' Mark Anthony Neal called it "the most danceable hip-hop recording" of 1986. According to Touré of The New York Times, "It is Rakim's verbal dexterity as well as his calm, deep voice and dark tone that has made this song a rap classic: 'I came in the door/ I said it before/ I'll never let the mic magnetize me no more/ But it's bitin' me/ Fightin' me/ Invitin' me to rhyme/ I can't hold it back/ I'm looking for the line/ Takin' off my coat/ Clearin' my throat/ The rhyme will be kickin' it/ Til I hit my last note.'" Remixes of both “Eric B. Is President” and “My Melody” were included on the album as opposed to their original versions.

The second single, "I Know You Got Soul", peaked at number 39 on the Hot Dance Music/Club Play chart, number 34 on the Hot Dance Music/Maxi-Singles Sales, and number 64 on the Hot R&B/Hip-Hop Singles & Tracks. The track's production contains "digitized cymbal crashes, breathing sounds, and a bumping bass line." The song popularized James Brown samples in hip-hop songs. The British band M|A|R|R|S sampled the line, "Pump up the volume", on their number one UK single, "Pump Up the Volume". Rolling Stone ranked it at number 386 on "The 500 Greatest Songs of All Time".

The third single, "I Ain't No Joke", peaked at number 38 on the Hot R&B/Hip-Hop Singles & Tracks. Described as one of the album's "monumental singles", Michael Di Bella wrote in the All Music Guide to Rock that "Rakim grabs the listener by the throat and illustrates his mastery of the rhyming craft". The fourth single, "Move the Crowd", peaked at number three on the Hot Dance Music/Club Play chart and number 25 on the Hot Dance Music/Maxi-Singles Sales. The track's B-side, "Paid in Full", was released as a single in 1987 and later remixed by the production duo Coldcut. The remix used several vocal samples, most prominently "Im Nin'alu" by Israeli singer Ofra Haza. In 2008, the song was ranked at number 24 on VH1's "100 Greatest Hip Hop Songs".

== Reception and impact ==
Retrospective professional ratings
Review scores
Source	Rating
AllMusic	5/5 stars
Blender	5/5 stars
Melody Maker	5/5 stars
Muzik	4/5 stars
Pitchfork	7.8/10
Q	4/5 stars
The Rolling Stone Album Guide	5/5 stars
The Source	5/5 stars
Spin Alternative Record Guide	10/10
Uncut	4/5 stars

In a contemporary review for The Washington Post, Mark Jenkins highlighted the single "Eric B. Is President" but was unimpressed by the rest of Paid in Full: "Its beats are monotonous, and the attempts to take 'jazz and the quiet storm' and 'convert into hip-hop form' fall flat." Robert Christgau gave the album a "B" grade in his "Consumer Guide" column for The Village Voice. Writing in 2001, he said it has "four groundbreaking masterworks" in "I Ain't No Joke", "I Know You Got Soul", "Paid in Full", and "Eric B. Is President", but was less enthusiastic about the other six songs: "They're pure, innovative, in-your-face—no doubt. But they're also turntablism with spoken decoration, of small use to anyone who hasn't internalized the 'real' hip hop aesthetic." In the newspaper's annual Pazz & Jop critics' poll, it was named the 27th best album of 1987.

Paid in Full was released during what became known as the golden age hip-hop era. In The Rolling Stone Album Guide (2004), Sasha Frere-Jones called it "one of hip-hop's perfect records", while Alex Ogg considered it to be the duo's magnum opus in his book The Men Behind Def Jam. Rakim's rapping on the album set a blueprint for future rappers and helped secure East Coast hip-hop's reputation for innovative lyrical technique. Author William Cobb stated in To the Break of Dawn that his rapping had "stepped outside" of the preceding era of old school hip-hop and that while the vocabulary and lyrical dexterity of newer rappers had improved, it was "nowhere near what Rakim introduced to the genre". The New York Times' Dimitri Ehrlich, who described the album as "an artistic and commercial benchmark", credited Rakim for helping "give birth to a musical genre" and leading "a quiet musical revolution, introducing a soft-spoken rapping style". AllMusic's Steve Huey declared Paid in Full one of hip-hop's most influential albums and "essential listening" for those interested in the genre's "basic musical foundations". MTV ranked it at number one in "The Greatest Hip-Hop Albums of All Time", stating it raised the standards of hip-hop "both sonically and poetically" and described it as "captivating, profound, innovative and instantly influential". The album is broken down track-by-track by Rakim in Brian Coleman's book Check the Technique.

In 2003, Rolling Stone listed Paid in Full at number 228 on "The 500 Greatest Albums of All Time", maintaining the rating in a 2012 revised list, calling it "Ice-grilled, laid-back, diamond-sharp: Rakim is a front-runner in the race for Best Rapper Ever, and this album is a big reason why." In the 2020 reboot of the list, the album's rank shot up to number 61. Similarly, Blender magazine included the album in its "500 CDs You Must Own Before You Die". Time magazine listed it as one of the eighteen albums of the 1980s in its "All-TIME 100" albums; editor Alan Light acknowledged the record changed the "sound, flow, and potential" of hip-hop and that if Rakim is "the greatest MC of all time, as many argue, this album is the evidence". Jess Harvell of Pitchfork complimented Rakim for an "endless display of pure skill" and described the album as "laidback and funky", but believed it contained "too much filler to get a free 'classic' pass". Pitchfork placed Paid in Full at number fifty-two in its "Top 100 Albums of the 1980s"; editor Sam Chennault wrote that Rakim inspired a generation of MCs and "defined what it meant to be a hip-hop lyricist". By 2018, at which point Pitchfork had substantially altered their list of the top albums of the 1980s, Paid in Full was moved to number eleven and called ″a crowning achievement of hip-hop's first golden age″ and one of the genre's ″glittering Rosetta Stones″. Slant Magazine listed the album at #32 on its list of "Best Albums of the 1980s" saying "For his part, Rakim didn't need to rely on macho jargon and trite gangsterisms for his self-aggrandizing sermons; he would simply reel off line after line of spellbinding wordplay, influencing an entire decade of tongue-twisting MCs in the process."

Rakim is credited with influencing rappers including the Wu-Tang Clan, Jay-Z, 50 Cent and Nas, who cited Paid in Full as one of his favorite albums. 50 Cent told NME that Paid in Full was the first album he bought: "I used to get my grandmother's tape recorder – the one she used to tape church services – and record hip-hop off the radio. And, with Eric B. & Rakim, I think that was the first moment where I felt like, 'I've got to own this. This is crucial.'" "It was a record that caused trouble," remarked Busta Rhymes, "but it was one you couldn't top." Eminem borrows or interpolates lines from Paid in Full on tracks from The Marshall Mathers LP including "My Melody" ("I'm Back") and "As The Rhyme Goes On" ("The Way I Am").

On July 11, 1995, the Recording Industry Association of America (RIAA) certified the album platinum. As of December 1997, it had sold over a million copies.

== Track listing ==
All songs written and produced by Eric B. & Rakim.

No.	Title	Length
1.	"I Ain't No Joke"	3:54
2.	"Eric B. Is on the Cut" (instrumental)	3:48
3.	"My Melody" (remix)	6:46
4.	"I Know You Got Soul"	4:45
5.	"Move the Crowd"	3:49
6.	"Paid in Full"	3:50
7.	"As the Rhyme Goes On"	4:00
8.	"Chinese Arithmetic" (instrumental)	4:07
9.	"Eric B. Is President" (remix)	6:20
10.	"Extended Beat" (instrumental mix of "Move the Crowd")	3:49

== Personnel ==
Adapted from AllMusic.

- Ruth Kaplan – art direction
- Patrick Adams – engineer
- Robert Hill – executive producer
- Herb Powers – mastering
- Ron Contarsy – photography
- Eric B. & Rakim – producers
- Marley Marl – remixing

== Charts ==
Chart (1987)	Peak position
UK Albums Chart	85
US Top Pop Albums	58
US Top Black Albums	8

== Certifications ==
Region	Certification	Certified units/sales
United States (RIAA)	Platinum	1,000,000^{^}
^{^} Shipments figures based on certification alone.

== Reissues ==
Region	Date	Label	Format	Catalog
United States	October 27, 1998	Island/PolyGram Records	Double CD (Platinum Edition) Out Of Print	524 573
United States	November 4, 2003	Island/IDJMG/Universal Records	Double CD (Deluxe Edition)	986 083
United States	April 26, 2005	Island/IDJMG/Universal Records	CD (Expanded Edition)	988 042

== See also ==
- Album era
