= Don't Sweat the Technique =

Studio album by Eric B. & Rakim
- Released: June 23, 1992
- Studio: The Hit Factory (New York City)
- Genres: Jazz rap; boom bap
- Length: 47:21
- Label: MCA
- Producers: Eric B. & Rakim

Eric B. & Rakim chronology
Let the Rhythm Hit 'Em (1990)	Don't Sweat the Technique (1992)

Singles from Don't Sweat the Technique
- 1. "What's on Your Mind" Released: 1991; 2. "Know the Ledge" Released: February 15, 1992; 3. "Don't Sweat the Technique" Released: June 27, 1992; 4. "Casualties of War" Released: 1992

Don't Sweat the Technique is the fourth and final studio album by American hip hop duo Eric B. & Rakim, released on June 23, 1992, by MCA Records. It was recorded and produced by Eric B. & Rakim at The Hit Factory in New York City. The album builds on the sounds of 1990's Let the Rhythm Hit 'Em, with Rakim sounding more aggressive on Eric B.'s jazzy, soulful production.

The album debuted at number 22 on the Billboard 200 chart the week of July 11, 1992. It also charted at number nine on the Top R&B Albums chart. The title track was a minor radio hit. "Casualties of War" was also released as a single and contains some of Rakim's most political lyrics. The single "What's on Your Mind" originally appeared on the soundtrack to the 1991 film House Party 2, while "Know the Ledge" first appeared in the film Juice under the title "Juice (Know the Ledge)".

== Content ==
The album features more of Rakim's socially conscious lyrics. "Casualties of War" relates to the Gulf War in which the United States-led military coalition invaded former ally Iraq following its war with Kuwait. It mentions the concept of post-traumatic stress disorder, and relates to Rakim's Muslim faith. The track "What's Going On" relates to the crack epidemic that plagued New York in the late-1980s and early-1990s, poverty, black-on-black crime, police brutality, and abortion. The tenth track, "Know the Ledge" (which originally appeared on the soundtrack to the 1992 film Juice), showcases Rakim's storytelling as he shares a first-person narrative of a neighborhood thug and drug dealer who is forced to come to grips with his violent and reckless lifestyle.

== Singles ==
Four singles were released from the album. The first single "What's on Your Mind" (which initially appeared on the soundtrack to the 1991 film House Party 2) reached numbers 34 and 20 on the Billboard Hot R&B/Hip-Hop Songs and Hot Rap Songs charts, respectively. The second single, "Know the Ledge" (which appeared in the 1992 film Juice), reached number 96 on the Billboard Hot 100. The third single, "Don't Sweat the Technique", peaked at number 14 and number 1 on the Hot R&B/Hip-Hop Songs and Hot Rap Songs charts, respectively, while the fourth and final single, "Casualties of War", peaked at numbers 23 and 11 on the Hot R&B/Hip-Hop Songs and Hot Rap Songs charts, respectively.

== Critical reception ==
Professional ratings
Review scores
Source	Rating
AllMusic	4/5 stars
Boston Herald	A−
Robert Christgau	A−
Entertainment Weekly	C+
Orlando Sentinel	4/4 stars
Q	4/5 stars
Rolling Stone	4/5 stars
The Rolling Stone Album Guide	4/5 stars
The Source	4/5 stars

Don't Sweat the Technique received positive reviews from contemporary music critics. In his review for Rolling Stone magazine, Havelock Nelson said that "Eric B.'s tracks are mellow and mean, while Rakim's lyrics are at once eloquent and threatening". Nelson wrote that the duo "expound further on the funky-fresh aesthetic" with Don't Sweat the Technique, adding that it "activates the mind – it's erotic, playful, violent, dramatic, funky, jazzy and definitely dope". Gil Griffin of The Washington Post praised Rakim's machismo lyrics and Eric B.'s "dense jazz tracks full of acoustic bass, brass, piano, and thick drumbeats". Orlando Sentinel writer Parry Gettelman praised Rakim's "assured rhymes" and noted Eric B.'s beats as "economically laced with insistent vocal and instrumental riffs". The Boston Herald complimented Eric B.'s "diverse mix of beats and melodies ... from hard funk to more subdued blues and jazz", concluding that "The potent combination of articulate raps and catchy beats makes 'Don't Sweat' a real burner". Musician stated similarly, "What keeps this duo dynamic is that they understand the importance of sticking with the basics—hard beats, sly samples and imaginative cadences—and foregoing fashion".

In a mixed review, Entertainment Weekly's James Bernard viewed that the album lacks "the roller coaster rush of 'Teach' or 'Casualties of War,'", writing that the duo "have gone back to the well too many times, retaining the technique without maintaining the energy". Dimitri Ehrlich of Spin was ambivalent towards "Erik B.'s meat-and-potatoes approach to assembling tracks", but viewed the album as "a more cohesive and inspired effort" than Let the Rhythm Hit 'Em. Ehrlich praised Rakim's rhymes as "lively, varied, and imaginative" and stated "With his gruffly evocative street reporting and fine sense of detail, he creates scenarios of urban apocalypse that seem to echo Erik B.'s survivalist grooves". Q magazine felt the duo "may be one of the more venerable rap teams, but they're clearly still capable of adapting to changing styles". Robert Christgau, writing in The Village Voice, gave the album an "A−". He said that Rakim's metaphors exploit the "interface between horror movies and the postmodern imagination", and highlighted Eric B.'s "new groove" as the "star of the show", which, "when he hits it right," is "like the mouth you love doing the spot you forgot."

In a retrospective review, AllMusic editor Jason Elias called the album "another strong effort from one of rap's most respected acts" and highlighted "the brilliant ear of Eric B. who can cut the tension and exact magic out of a going-nowhere track".

== Track listing ==
1. "What's on Your Mind?" – 5:31
2. "Teach the Children" – 3:01
3. "Pass the Hand Grenade" – 3:14
4. "Casualties of War" – 4:02
5. "Rest Assured" – 3:36
6. "The Punisher" – 4:10
7. "Relax with Pep" – 4:00
8. "Keep the Beat" – 4:15
9. "What's Going On?" – 3:52
10. "Know the Ledge" – 3:58
11. "Don't Sweat the Technique" – 4:22
12. "Kick Along" – 3:26

== Personnel ==
Credits are adapted from AllMusic.

- Louis Alfred III – assistant engineer
- Lee Anthony – engineer, mixing
- El Cimarrón – design
- Eric B. & Rakim – executive producer, producer, programming
- Dante Gioia – assistant engineer
- Carl Glanville – assistant engineer
- Andy Grassi – assistant engineer
- Mark Harder – engineer, mixing
- Large Professor – production coordination
- Herb Powers – mastering
- Rakim – performer, producer, programming, vocals
- Richard Simmons – production coordination
- Vartan – art direction
- Cesar Vera – photography
- Craig Winzelberg – assistant engineer
- Dann Wojnar – assistant engineer
- Kerwin Young – production coordination

== Charts ==
Chart (1992)	Peak position
US Billboard 200	22
US Top R&B/Hip-Hop Albums (Billboard)	9

== In popular culture ==
The third single "Don't Sweat the Technique" appeared in numerous video games, including the 2002 video game Aggressive Inline, the 2016 video game Watch Dogs 2, and the 2018 video game Forza Horizon 4. It also appeared in the 2011 Matthew McConaughey film The Lincoln Lawyer. The song appears in season 3, episode 4 of Sex Education. It is also featured during the ending credits of the fifth-season episode "The Way Ahead" in the Netflix series The Crown.

"Know the Ledge" (also known as "Juice (Know the Ledge)" from the film Juice) has seen use in the 2007 skateboarding video game Skate, the 2002 BMX video game Mat Hoffman's Pro BMX 2, and the 2017 basketball video game NBA 2K18. It was used in the 2018 Netflix only release The Cloverfield Paradox. It was used in the 2021 film Tom & Jerry.
