= Eric B. Is President =

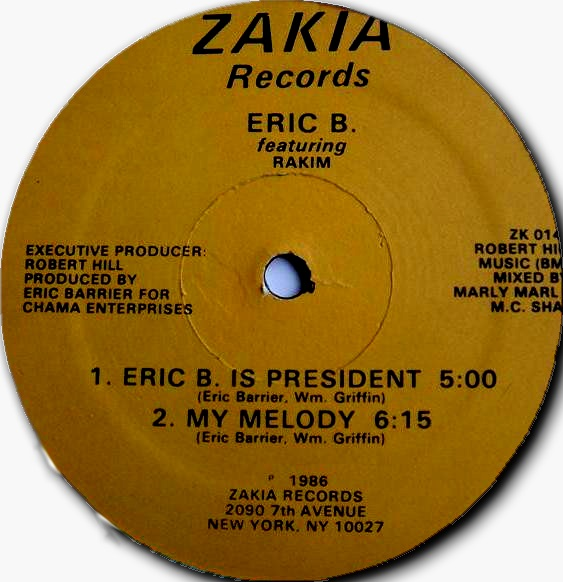

Single by Eric B. & Rakim

from the album Paid in Full
- B-side: "My Melody"
- Released: June 1986
- Genre: Hip hop
- Length: 5:00 (Original, single version); 6:20 (Remix, album version) "My Melody": 6:15 or 6:30 (Original, single version); 6:46 (Remix, album version)
- Label: Zakia; 4th & B'way; Island
- Songwriters: Eric Barrier; William Griffin
- Producers: Eric B.; Marley Marl (uncredited); MC Shan (uncredited)

Eric B. & Rakim singles chronology
"Eric B. Is President" (1986)	"I Ain't No Joke" (1987)

Audio sample
- file; help

"Eric B. Is President" is the debut single released by hip-hop duo Eric B. & Rakim. The bassline is an interpolation of Fonda Rae's "Over Like a Fat Rat". Marley Marl is often credited with handling production duties for the song, but Eric B. has disputed this in recent interviews.

About this controversy, Eric B. told Allhiphop.com, "I took the records to Marley Marl's house in Queensbridge and paid Marley Marl to be the engineer. Marley got paid. That's why he's not a producer, that's why he is not getting publishing. I brought the music. I just couldn't work the equipment because that’s not what I did..."

During an interview in 2008, Eric B. said,

I took Fonda Rae's 'Over Like A Fat Rat' and said 'This is the bass line I'm going to use for this record.' Rakim spit the beer all over the wall and thought it was the funniest shit in the world. I told Rakim, just like you laughing now you going to be laughing all the way to the bank and be a millionaire one day because of this record.

== Samples ==
- "Funky President" by James Brown
- "Impeach the President" (snare) by The Honey Drippers
- "The Champ" by The Mohawks
- "Long Red" (drums, vocals) by Mountain
- "Over Like a Fat Rat" by Fonda Rae (replayed bassline)

== Charts ==
Chart (1986)	Peak position
US Billboard Hot Black Singles	48
