= Follow the Leader (Eric B. & Rakim album) =

Studio album by Eric B. & Rakim
- Released: July 26, 1988
- Recorded: 1987–1988
- Studios: Power Play (Queens, New York City)
- Genres: East Coast hip-hop; golden age hip-hop
- Length: 48:47
- Labels: Uni; MCA
- Producers: Eric B.; Rakim

Eric B. & Rakim chronology
Paid in Full (1987)	Follow the Leader (1988)	Let the Rhythm Hit 'Em (1990)

Singles from Follow the Leader
- 1. "Follow the Leader" Released: July 16, 1988; 2. "Microphone Fiend" Released: 1988

Follow the Leader is the second studio album by American hip hop duo Eric B. & Rakim, released on July 26, 1988. Following their debut album, Paid in Full (1987), Eric B. & Rakim left 4th & B'way Records and signed with Uni Records, a subsidiary label of major label MCA Records. They recorded Follow the Leader at Power Play Studios in Long Island City in Queens, New York. The duo produced, composed, and arranged the album with additional contributions from Rakim's brother Stevie Blass Griffin, who contributed with various instruments. Eric B. & Rakim worked with audio engineers Carlton Batts and Patrick Adams on the album.

== Reception and legacy ==
Professional ratings
Review scores
Source	Rating
AllMusic	5/5 stars
Los Angeles Times	3.5/4 stars
NME	8/10
The Philadelphia Inquirer	4/4 stars
Pitchfork	8.5/10
Record Mirror	4/5
Rolling Stone	3/5 stars
The Rolling Stone Album Guide	4.5/5 stars
Spin Alternative Record Guide	9/10
The Village Voice	A−

Follow the Leader peaked at number 22 on the U.S. Billboard Top Pop Albums and at number seven on Billboard's Top Black Albums chart. It achieved higher charting than Eric B. & Rakim's debut album and serves as their best-charting album in the United States. The album produced four singles, "Follow the Leader", "Microphone Fiend", "The R", and "Lyrics of Fury". "Follow the Leader" peaked at number 16 on the Hot Black Singles, at number 11 on the Hot Dance/Disco, and at number five on the Hot Dance Music/Maxi-Singles Sales chart. "The R" reached number 79 on the Hot Black Singles, number 28 on the Hot Dance/Disco, number 41 on the Hot Dance Music/Maxi-Singles Sales, and number 14 on the Hot Rap Singles chart. On September 27, 1988, the album was certified gold by the Recording Industry Association of America for shipments in excess of 500,000 copies in the United States.

Follow the Leader was well received by contemporary critics. Los Angeles Times writer Jonathan Gold viewed it as "far more consistent" than the duo's Paid in Full, calling Eric B. "a master of chill, understated beats" and complimenting Rakim for weaving "a laid-back web of words, his whiskey-smooth tenor less noisy but more intense than the machine-gun mutterings you hear booming from beat boxes, his keen rhymes all the more devastating for being near-whispered where lesser rappers would shout". In his review for The Village Voice, Robert Christgau found the duo's sampling as an improvement from their previous work's "Brownian motion" and complimented Rakim's "ever-increasing words-per-minute ratio—the man loves language like a young Bob D". Peter Watrous of The New York Times commended Eric B.'s mixes and described him as "a minimalist virtuoso". Watrous called Rakim "one of the most distinctive rappers in the business" and elaborated on his lyricism: "His voice soars as gracefully as a well-thrown football; it'll change direction on the spot. He will vary rhythms, pushing and pulling against the beat to highlight his lyrics. Insistent, cool and dedicated, his rapping has an urgency that makes the music much more than pop; it sounds like a musical version of a political, social vision.

In the 2006 book To the Break of Dawn: A Freestyle on the Hip Hop Aesthetic, author William Jelani Cobb later wrote of the album's significance:

On the heels of Paid in Full, Eric B. & Rakim delivered a full clip of album titled Follow the Leader in 1988. Featuring a broader spectrum of sounds than the James Brown samples that had defined the initial release, Follow the Leader saw Rakim at his most lyrically fierce, issuing deft and def threats on such tracks as 'Microphone Fiend,' 'Lyrics of Fury,' and the nearly felonious 'No Competition.' The release marked the high point in the collaboration between the two and prefaced the long slide they faced in the 1990s.

In a retrospective review, AllMusic editor Steve Huey viewed Follow the Leader as an improvement over Paid in Full, commending Rakim's "agile, up-tempo lyrical showcases". In a dual review of both Paid in Full and Follow the Leader's reissues, Pitchfork's Jess Harvell expressed that the high points of the latter album "are as high as any rap group has gotten" and wrote that both albums' music serve as "a reminder of a brief period where people thought they could become a millionaire on skills alone, where the reality of that was so far away that no one had to think about what being a millionaire would mean to the culture that nurtured those skills". In 1998, Follow the Leader was selected as one of The Source's 100 Best Rap Albums, and in 2005, it was ranked number 12 on comedian Chris Rock's list of the "Top 25 Hip-Hop Albums". The track "Lyrics of Fury" was ranked number five on About.com's list of "Top 100 Rap Songs".

The album is ranked number 979 in All-Time Top 1000 Albums (3rd. edition, 2000).

== Follow the Leader (Reimagined as Jazz) ==
Follow the Leader, re-imagined as Jazz is an instrumental reworking of the entire album by Jonathan Hay, Mike Smith and Benny Reid. The album spent four non-consecutive weeks at No. 1 on the Billboard Jazz Albums chart, dethroning Michael Bublé's Love. Eric B. told Forbes,

Hearing the music faithfully arranged and re-recorded with the stellar group of musicians Jonathan Hay and Benny Reid brought together not only stays true to our original work, but elevates and highlights the core concepts we drew from 30 years ago. [...] It really completes a full circle... We imitated jazz, and now jazz is imitating us.

Rakim was quoted in HipHopDX as saying:

The trajectory of this project is the ultimate blessing. It's tapping into a divine consciousness and showing how the universe continues to spin full circle. Eric and I were always heavy in our influence from the jazz genre. Then three decades in, we are influencing a jazz album, then that album is coming back around to influence Hip Hop production greats like Whoo Kid and hopefully a lot more. We used to dig through the crates at record stores to pull vinyl instrumentals and sample them for our tracks and now Follow The Leader is on vinyl for another generation to expand on with next level music. It's breaking new barriers, which is the core of Hip Hop culture.

== Track listing ==
All songs written and produced by Eric B. & Rakim (Eric Barrier, William Griffin).

No.	Title	Length
1.	"Follow the Leader"	5:36
2.	"Microphone Fiend"	5:17
3.	"Lyrics of Fury"	4:15
4.	"Eric B. Never Scared" (instrumental) ("Eric B. Is on the Cut" Part 2)	5:21
5.	"Just a Beat" (instrumental)	2:07
6.	"Put Your Hands Together"	5:15
7.	"To the Listeners"	4:32
8.	"No Competition"	3:52
9.	"The R"	3:55
10.	"Musical Massacre"	4:29
11.	"Beats for the Listeners" (instrumental) ("Extended Beat" Part 2)	4:08
Total length:		48:47

2005 Remastered Expanded Edition Bonus Tracks
No.	Title	Remixer(s)	Length
12.	"The R (Remix)"	CJ Mackintosh; Dave Dorrell	9:21
13.	"Microphone Fiend (Extended Remix)"	DJ Mark the 45 King	5:20
14.	"Put Your Hands Together (FON Force Remix)"	DJ Plankton; Robert Gordon	5:28
Total length:			68:56

== Personnel ==
Credits for Follow the Leader adapted from AllMusic.

- Patrick Adams – engineer
- Carlton Batts – engineer
- Eric B. & Rakim – vocals, producer
- Eric B. – performer
- Stevie Blass Griffin – composer, performer
- Rakim – arranger, producer

== Charts ==
Charts (1988)	Peak position
U.S. Top Pop Albums	22
U.S. Top Black Albums	7

== Certifications ==
Region	Certification	Certified units/sales
United States (RIAA)	Gold	500,000^{^}
^{^} Shipments figures based on certification alone.

== Bibliography ==
- Nathan Brackett, Christian Hoard, ed. (2004). The New Rolling Stone Album Guide. Completely Revised and Updated 4th Edition. Simon and Schuster. ISBN 0-7432-0169-8.
- Cobb, William Jelani (2006). To the Break of Dawn: A Freestyle on the Hip Hop Aesthetic. New York University Press. ISBN 0-8147-1670-9.
- Weisbard, Eric; Craig Marks (1995). Spin Alternative Record Guide. Vintage Books. ISBN 0-679-75574-8.
