= Eric B. & Rakim =

American hip hop duo

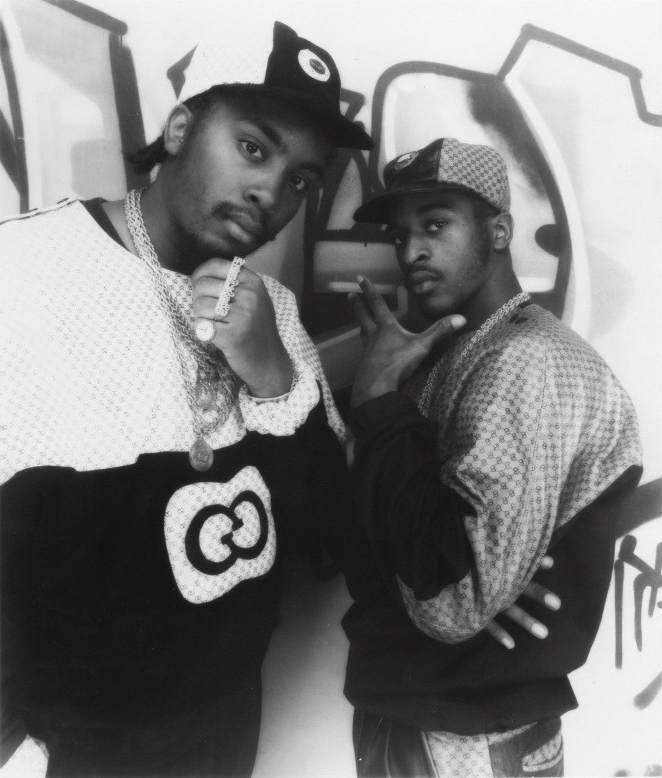
- Publicity still of Eric B. (left) and Rakim, 1987

Background information
- Origin: Long Island, New York, U.S.
- Genres: East Coast hip-hop; golden age hip-hop; boom bap
- Works: Eric B. & Rakim discography
- Years active: 1986–1993; 2016–2018
- Labels: 4th & B'way; Island; Uni; MCA
- Past members: Eric B. Rakim
- Website: www.ericbnrakim.com

Eric B. & Rakim were an American hip-hop duo formed on Long Island, New York, in 1986, composed of DJ Eric B. and rapper Rakim. They first received acclaim for their 1987 debut album Paid in Full, which featured versions of the popular singles "Eric B. Is President" and the title track. They followed with three successful albums: Follow the Leader (1988), Let the Rhythm Hit 'Em (1990), and Don't Sweat the Technique (1992).

AllMusic wrote that "during rap's so-called golden age in the late '80s, Eric B. & Rakim were almost universally recognized as the premier DJ/MC team in all of hip-hop." Tom Terrell of NPR called them "the most influential DJ/MC combo in contemporary pop music period."

== Career ==
=== Early years and Paid in Full ===
Eric Barrier was born and raised in East Elmhurst, Queens. He played trumpet and drums throughout high school, and later switched to experimenting with turntables prior to graduation. The newly dubbed "Eric B." soon began DJing for radio station WBLS in New York City, including WBLS' promotional events around the city. Barrier wound up meeting Alvin Toney, a promoter based in Queens. Eric B. had been looking for rappers and Toney recommended he use Freddie Foxxx, a Long Island MC. Toney took Eric B. to Foxxx's home, but Foxxx was not there, so Toney suggested another option: William Griffin, a.k.a. Rakim.

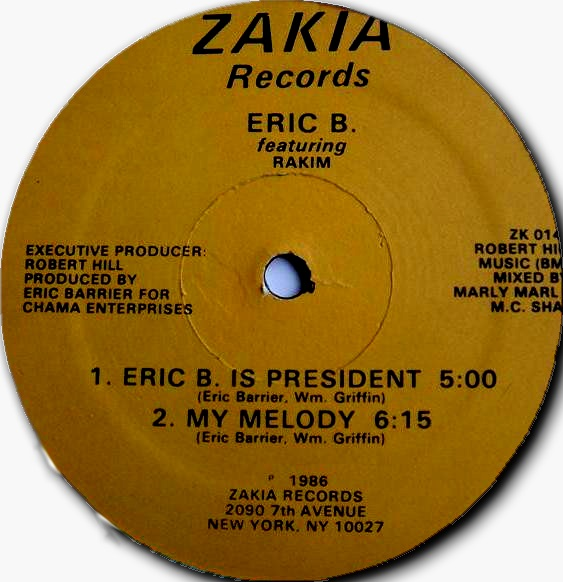
Eric B. & Rakim began their critically acclaimed partnership in 1986 with the release of "Eric B. is President" / "My Melody".

Griffin had begun writing rhymes as a teenager in Wyandanch and had taken the name "Rakim" as a result of his conversion to The Nation of Gods and Earths. Eric B. borrowed records from Rakim's brother, Stevie Blass Griffin (who worked at a plant pressing bootleg albums) and began cutting them in the basement for Rakim, who was down there drinking a beer and relaxing. Said Eric B., "I took Fonda Rae's "Over Like A Fat Rat" and said 'This is the bass line I'm going to use for this record.' Rakim spit the beer all over the wall and thought it was the funniest shit in the world. I told Rakim, just like you laughing now you going to be laughing all the way to the bank and be a millionaire one day because of this record."

Eric B. & Rakim decided to record together and came under the tutelage of Marley Marl. Stories vary over who actually produced their first single, 1986's "Eric B. Is President" (often cited as "Eric B For President" because of a mistake made when licensing the recording). Built on the Fonda Rea bass line sample, Eric B. later told AllHipHop, "I took the records to Marley Marl's house in Queensbridge and paid Marley Marl to be the engineer. Marley got paid. That's why he's not a producer; that's why he is not getting publishing. I brought the music. I just couldn't work the equipment because that's not what I did..."

The duo recorded their debut album, Paid in Full, at Power Play Studios in New York. The album was named in part after the Paid in Full posse, a notorious New York collective of gangsters and rappers: including the original 50 Cent, Killer Ben, Kool G Rap and Freddie Foxxx. The Paid in Full posse are featured on the back cover of the album. In 1987, 4th & B'way Records issued the album. After the success of "Eric B. is President", the album climbed into the Top Ten on the US Billboard Top R&B/Hip-Hop Albums chart. Eric B. would later admit that the album was rushed. "The reason Paid In Full is so short is because we stood in the studio for damn-near a week. The whole album came together in a week. Listen to the lyrics on it and listen to how short they are. That's because Rakim wrote it right there and we'd been in the studio like for a whole forty-eight hours trying to get the album finished." Rakim agrees: "[I] used to write my rhymes in the studio and go right into the booth and read them. When I hear my first album today I hear myself reading my rhymes—but I'm my worst critic. That's what I hear, though—because that's what it was. I'd go into the studio, put the beat down, write the song in like an hour, and go into the booth and read it from the paper..." Marley Marl stated that his cousin MC Shan was an assistant engineer on some tracks, including the single "My Melody," though Eric B. denies this. MTV listed the album as the greatest in hip-hop history:

When Paid in Full was released in 1987, Eric B. and Rakim left a mushroom cloud over the hip-hop community. The album was captivating, profound, innovative and instantly influential. MCs like Run-DMC, Chuck D and KRS-One had been leaping on the mic shouting with energy and irreverence, but Rakim took a methodical approach to his microphone fiending. He had a slow flow, and every line was blunt, mesmeric. And Eric B. had an ear for picking out loops and samples drenched with soul and turned out to be a trailblazer for producers in the coming years.

— MTV, "The Greatest Hip-Hop Albums of All Time" (2006)

The record has sold over a million copies and the Recording Industry Association of America (RIAA) certified it platinum in 1995. On the heels of the album's incredible platinum success, the duo were the first rap act to sign a million-dollar record deal as they entered into an agreement for three albums with MCA.

=== Follow the Leader and Let the Rhythm Hit 'Em ===
Follow the Leader, the duo's follow-up to Paid In Full; saw their production move away from the blunt minimalism of their debut. The title track and "Lyrics of Fury" were two of Rakim's most acclaimed lyrical performances. In 2003, comedian Chris Rock referred to Rakim's rhymes on the "...Fury" as 'lyrically, the best rapping anyone's ever done...' Rock also listed Follow the Leader as 12th on his Vibe magazine's list of the Top 25 Hip Hop Albums of All Time. The album was another massive success for the duo and included the classic single & video "Microphone Fiend". The video became a staple on the No. 1 rated show on Mtv, Yo Mtv Raps.

In 1989, the pair teamed up with Jody Watley on her single "Friends" from the album Larger Than Life. The song would reach the Top Ten on the Billboard Hot 100 chart and was one of the first notable collaborations between hip-hop and dance pop. Eric B. & Rakim rarely collaborated with other rappers. This was evident in early 1990, when KRS-One's Stop the Violence Movement put together the charity single "Self-Destruction". The song featured numerous notable rappers, but Rakim was noticeably absent from the proceedings. He told HalftimeOnline.net years later, "I don't think they hollered at me or they hollered at Eric B. and he didn't say anything to me. I was a little bitter with that shit because I felt I had something to do with bringing consciousness in hip hop to the table. I came out and did what I did in '86 and then you know people started running with it. Then when it comes time to do something they didn't holler at me so I was a little bitter. At the same time a lot of reasons I didn't do records with people is because I never wanted their light to reflect on me. I don't have a problem with it but everybody who knows at that time knows they were trying to say I was responsible for gangsta rap, too. They thought I was that dude in the hood so maybe they didn't holler at me for a reason. I love Kris, though—he definitely contributed a lot to hip hop. I've been on tour with him and I know him as a person. He's a good dude. I like Kris, but they definitely didn't holler at me for that man because I would have definitely did it."

Their 1990 album Let the Rhythm Hit 'Em was another successful gold album for the duo as they sold over 700,000 copies. Rakim referenced his enigmatic reputation on the song "Set 'Em Straight": "Here's the inside scoop on the fiend/They want to know why I'm seldom seen/'Cause who needs the TV screens and magazines/Or shooting through the city in fly limousines/'Cause one thing I don't need is a spotlight/'Cause I already got light..." He later said about his relative lack of commercial success: "You could sell a couple records and keep your integrity or you could go pop and sell a bunch of records and be gone tomorrow. I was trying to stick to my guns at that point."

Mark Coleman of Rolling Stone stated:

"There's nothing trendy about this impassive duo, no Steely Dan bites or bits of Afrodelic rhetoric here. Eric B. and Rakim are hip-hop formalists devoted to upholding the Seventies funk canon and advancing rap's original verbal mandate. Almost every track on their third album is built on poetic boasts and wicked J.B. samples, but dismissing Let the Rhythm Hit 'Em as some sort of conservative reaction—a gold-chain throwback—completely misses the point. Masters of their appointed tasks, rapper Rakim and Eric B. are also formal innovators. They both can riff and improvise like jazzmen, spinning endless variations on basic themes and playing off each other's moves with chilly intuition. The resulting music is as stark, complex and edgy as Rakim's stone-cold stare on the album cover."

The album was one of the first to receive the honor of a 5 mic rating in The Source. But, much like their debut album, there is controversy over the production credit.

=== Don't Sweat the Technique and split up ===
The duo made an appearance on the soundtrack for the 1991 comedy House Party 2, ("What's On Your Mind") and also recorded the theme for the film, Juice. Both singles were included on what would become the duo's last album together. Don't Sweat the Technique was released in 1992. The album was not supposed to be the last; but their contract with MCA was due to expire. During the recording of the album, both members expressed an interest in recording solo albums. However, Eric B. refused to sign the label's release contract, fearful that Rakim would abandon him. This led to a court case involving the two musicians and their former label. The legal wrangling eventually led to the duo dissolving completely. Eric B. has clarified that the monetary problems stemmed from labels like Island and others claiming ownership of the masters—not from any financial disputes between him and Rakim:

"The money got split 50/50 from the door, because I remember people would try to keep shit going. When we first came out, people were saying 'Eric was getting all the money' and 'he was trying to shine more than Rakim,' but that's not true. [I] would go to all the interviews, [because] Rakim didn't want to go to the interviews. He didn't like that part of the business. [But] we split all the money from dime one. I don't care what money I spent in the past, that money is never coming back. Whatever money we made, we split 50/50. Even up until now, we split every dime 50/50."

=== Post-breakup and legacy ===
Eric B. released a self-titled solo album in 1995 on the independent label 95th Street Recordings. Legal issues continued to delay Rakim's solo career, but he finally released The 18th Letter in 1997. In 1999, Rakim's second solo album The Master was released to less favorable reviews. By the turn of the millennium, Eric B. was pursuing other business interests outside of music. Rakim signed with Dr. Dre's Aftermath label in 2000, but the expected album never materialized. Since then, Rakim has made guest appearances with numerous other artists such as Jay-Z ("The Watcher, Part 2"), Truth Hurts ("Addictive"), Nas, KRS-One and Kanye West ("Classic"). In 2002, "Don't Sweat The Technique" appeared in the video game Aggressive Inline. In November 2009, Rakim released The Seventh Seal.

Ownership of the duo's catalog consolidated in 1999, when PolyGram (which owned Island Records, which released Paid in Full) merged with Universal Music Group, an outgrowth of MCA Records, which owned the rest of the duo's albums.

Eric B. & Rakim were announced as one of fifteen finalists to the Rock & Roll Hall of Fame in September 2011 and were nominated for a second time in 2024.

=== Reunion ===
On October 20, 2016, Eric B. announced via Twitter that he and Rakim reunited as a duo after 23 years and would tour in 2017. This was confirmed by Eric B's business representative Uncle Louie during an interview with Rolling Stone.

The duo's first reunion concert was held at the Apollo Theater in New York City on July 7, 2017. In 2018, they announced a 17-date American tour for that spring.

== Artistry ==
=== Rapping technique and jazz influences ===
Rakim's rhyming deviated from the simple rhyme patterns of early-1980s hip-hop. His free-rhythm style ignored bar lines and had earned comparisons to Thelonious Monk. The New York Times' Ben Ratliff wrote that Rakim's "unblustery rapping developed the form beyond the flat-footed rhythms of schoolyard rhymes". While many rappers developed their technique through improvisation, Rakim was one of the first to demonstrate advantages of a writerly style, as with for instance his pioneering use of internal rhymes and multisyllabic rhymes. Unlike previous rappers such as LL Cool J, KRS-One, and Run-DMC, who delivered their vocals with high energy, Rakim employed a relaxed, stoic delivery. According to MTV, "We'd been used to MCs like Run and DMC, Chuck D and KRS-One leaping on the mic shouting with energy and irreverence, but Rakim took a methodical approach to his microphone fiending. He had a slow flow, and every line was blunt, mesmeric." Rakim's relaxed delivery was inspired by jazz; he had played the saxophone and was a John Coltrane fan.

Rakim's subject matter often covered his own rapping skills and lyrical superiority over other rappers. AllMusic editor Steve Huey comments that "the majority of his lyrics concern his own skills and his Islamic faith." He also notes Rakim for his "complex internal rhymes, compounding, literate imagery, velvet-smooth flow, and unpredictable, off-the-beat rhythms." Pitchfork writer Jess Harvell described his rapping as "authoritative, burnished, and possessing an unflappable sense of rhythm".

=== Musical style ===
Paid in Full, which contains gritty, heavy, and dark beats, marked the beginning of heavy sampling in hip-hop records. Of the album's ten tracks, three are instrumentals. As a disc jockey, Eric B. had reinstated the art of live turntable mixing. His soul-filled sampling became influential in future hip-hop production. Music critic Robert Christgau noted that Eric B. had incorporated "touches of horn or whistle deep in the mix" of his sampled percussion and scratches.

== Accolades ==
The editors of About.com ranked them as No. 5 on their list of the 10 Greatest Hip-Hop Duos of All Time, and Rolling Stone ranked them No. 5 on its list of the 20 Greatest Duos of All Time. The duo have been nominated for induction into the Rock and Roll Hall of Fame in 2012 and 2024.

== Discography ==
- Paid in Full (1987)
- Follow the Leader (1988)
- Let the Rhythm Hit 'Em (1990)
- Don't Sweat the Technique (1992)
