= Mat Hoffman's Pro BMX 2 =

2002 video game

- Developer: Rainbow Studios (Note: GameCube port developed by Gratuitous Games, Game Boy Advance port by HotGen.)
- Publisher: Activision O2
- Platforms: PlayStation 2, Xbox, Game Boy Advance, GameCube
- Release: PlayStation 2, Xbox, Game Boy Advance: NA: August 13, 2002; EU: October 4, 2002; GameCube: NA: October 8, 2002; EU: December 6, 2002
- Genre: Sports
- Modes: Single-player, multiplayer

Mat Hoffman's Pro BMX 2 is a 2002 BMX video game developed by Rainbow Studios and published by Activision under the Activision O2 label. The game, which serves as a sequel to Mat Hoffman's Pro BMX, was released on August 13, 2002 for the PlayStation 2 and Xbox. A Game Boy Advance port was developed by HotGen and released the same day as the PlayStation 2 and Xbox versions. A GameCube port was developed by Gratuitous Games and was released on October 8, 2002. It received "favorable" reviews.

== Gameplay ==
Like its predecessor, Mat Hoffman's Pro BMX 2 uses the basic game structure carried over from Activision's Tony Hawk's Pro Skater series of video games. The goal of the game is to successfully perform and combine different tricks on a BMX bike, with successful executions adding to the player's score. The point value of the trick is based on time maintained, degrees rotated, number of tricks performed in sequence, and the number of times the tricks have been used (the more often a trick is used, the less it's worth). Successful tricks also add to the player's special meter, which, once full, allows for the execution of "signature moves" which are worth more than normal tricks. Grinds, lip tricks, and manuals (wheelies) are included in the game to help the player link tricks together into combos. Bails (falling off the bike due to poor landing) cause for no points to be awarded for the attempted trick or combo, and resets the special bar to empty.

Enhancements over the previous installment include improved graphics, new tricks (including flatland tricks and a "trick tweaking system", similar to the trick modifier featured in Dave Mirra Freestyle BMX), a balance meter for grind and lip tricks, more riders, a longer career mode, a larger soundtrack, and larger, more interactive environments.

The player can choose from eleven different professional BMX riders, with each rider having their own unique stats, bikes, and trick sets. Eight levels are included in the game, set in and around various cities across the United States. The Xbox version features a total of twelve professional BMX riders and nine levels: rider Chad Kagy and the London level are exclusive to this release.

=== Game modes ===
Road Trip — "Road Trip" is the equivalent to the previous game's "Career Mode". In this mode, the player has to complete different tasks (such as getting a high score or collecting items) in an attempt to earn points and advance to new levels. Each level has twelve goals to complete (as opposed to five in the first game), broken up into three categories based on difficulty. Only four goals are available at one time, which must be completed before unlocking the next set of challenges. Advancing in this mode allows the player to unlock new levels, bikes, riders, and songs from the game's soundtrack. Videos are also unlocked which includes over 90 minutes of footage from a real BMX tour featuring the pros, which promoted the game.

Session — In this mode, the player chooses a BMX rider, an available bike, an available level, and rides for a one to five-minute session in an attempt to set a high score.

Free Ride — Free Ride is similar to the Session mode; the player chooses a BMX rider, an available bike, and an available level. Instead of a timed session, however, there is no time limit, allowing the player to practice or simply explore, searching for gaps and secrets areas.

Tiki Battle — After completing the Road Trip mode, a bonus game is unlocked, called the "Tiki Battle", which acts as a first person shooter. The player attempts to defeat a large animated statue located in the Hawaii level of the game, collecting ammunition and health bonuses while avoiding fireballs thrown at the player. When this challenge is completed, a special character is unlocked and the "Tiki Battle" becomes available in the main menu of the game.

Multiplayer modes — The game features several new and returning multi-player modes including Horse, Trick Attack, Graffiti, Tag, and Push.

Course Editor — This mode allows the player to create their own level by arranging various ramps, rails, and other pieces. Gaps can be created and named, and the player's starting positions can also be chosen by the player. Once a created park is finished, the level can be accessed in the game's "Session", "Free Ride", and multiplayer modes.

== Reception ==
Reception

Aggregate score
| Aggregator | Score | | | |
| Aggregator | GBA | GameCube | PS2 | Xbox |
|---|---|---|---|---|
| Metacritic | 82/100 | 70/100 | 76/100 | 75/100 |

Review scores
| Publication | Score | | | |
| Publication | GBA | GameCube | PS2 | Xbox |
|---|---|---|---|---|
| AllGame | 4/5 | N/A | N/A | N/A |
| Edge | N/A | N/A | 6/10 | N/A |
| Electronic Gaming Monthly | N/A | N/A | 7.5/10 | N/A |
| Eurogamer | N/A | N/A | 7/10 | N/A |
| Game Informer | N/A | N/A | 7.25/10 | N/A |
| GamePro | N/A | N/A | 4/5 | 4/5 |
| GameRevolution | N/A | N/A | B | N/A |
| GameSpot | 8.2/10 | 7/10 | 7.2/10 | 7.2/10 |
| GameSpy | N/A | 3/5 | 3/5 | 74% |
| GameZone | N/A | 6.9/10 | 8/10 | 7.7/10 |
| IGN | 8.5/10 | 7.6/10 | 8.1/10 | 8.1/10 |
| Nintendo Power | 3.9/5 | 3.5/5 | N/A | N/A |
| Official U.S. PlayStation Magazine | N/A | N/A | 4/5 | N/A |
| Official Xbox Magazine (US) | N/A | N/A | N/A | 8.4/10 |

The game received "generally favorable reviews" on all platforms except the GameCube version, which received "average" reviews, according to video game review aggregator Metacritic. In Japan, where the PlayStation 2 version was ported and published by Capcom on May 27, 2004, Famitsu gave it a score of one six, two fives, and one six for a total of 22 out of 40. GameSpot named it the best Game Boy Advance game of August 2002.

== Cancelled third game ==
A cancelled third game was proposed by Dave Mirra Freestyle BMX developer Z-Axis, whose studio was just recently acquired by the company's publisher Activision, but it was cancelled before development started despite the good reception of the second game.
