= Aggressive Inline (video game) =

2002 video game

- Cover art featuring Jaren Grob
- Developers: Z-Axis; Full Fat (GBA)
- Publisher: AKA Acclaim
- Director: Randy Condon
- Designer: Vince Castillo
- Artist: William A. Spence IV
- Platforms: PlayStation 2; GameCube; Xbox; Game Boy Advance
- Release: May 29, 2002: PlayStation 2; NA: May 29, 2002; PAL: August 2, 2002; GameCube; NA: August 1, 2002; UK: September 6, 2002; Xbox; NA: August 1, 2002; PAL: August 23, 2002; Game Boy Advance; NA: August 28, 2002; PAL: September 6, 2002
- Genre: Sports
- Modes: Single-player, multiplayer

Aggressive Inline is a 2002 sports video game developed by Z-Axis and published by AKA Acclaim. The game simulates aggressive inline skating, with players completing tricks and objectives in open-ended levels. The game was released in North America for the PlayStation 2 on May 29, 2002, followed by GameCube and Xbox versions in August. A Game Boy Advance version was released by Full Fat in August 2002. The developers of Aggressive Inline aimed to innovate upon the formula of the Tony Hawk's series of extreme sports games, building on the engine and tools of the developer's previous title, Dave Mirra Freestyle BMX 2. The developers experimented with gameplay features, including the inclusion of open-ended level design and greater environmental interaction, an organic skill progression system, and the removal of fixed time limits, many of which had not been implemented in an extreme sports game before.

Upon release, Aggressive Inline received positive reviews from critics, with praise for the game's innovative features, the large, open-ended design of its levels, and detailed visual presentation, with minor criticism directed towards the soundtrack and character detail. The Game Boy Advance version of the game received weaker reviews than its counterparts, with reviewers faulting the game's more conventional design, citing its simpler objectives and inclusion of a time limit. The retrospective reception of Aggressive Inline has similarly been positive, with reviewers praising the game's innovations as prescient to the design of later titles in the extreme sports genre, particularly the subsequent adoption of many of its features within the Tony Hawk's Pro Skater series.

== Gameplay ==
The player completes tricks, such as grinds, to earn points and maintain the Juice Meter.

Aggressive inline is an extreme sports game that simulates aggressive inline skating, in which the player navigates a series of levels to perform tricks, score points, and complete various objectives. Controls involve the use of the D-pad to move and buttons to jump and perform tricks, including grabs, flips, grinds, wallrides and manuals. The player can also interact with environmental elements, such as vaulting from rails, grabbing and spinning around poles, skitching on the back of moving vehicles, and bailing out of tricks.

In the game's "Career" mode, the player completes a series of seven levels and progresses by completing challenges issued by characters in the level. Challenges include the performance of tricks in certain areas or on certain objects, or accumulating points for tricks within a time limit. Completion of challenges assigns points to the player, and reaching a threshold of points enables progress to the next level. Levels also contain several hidden collectables, allowing the player to unlock hidden areas to other levels, increase their attributes, or unlock special tricks.

Aggressive Inline features several mechanics, including a "Juice Meter" system in place of a fixed time limit. When the meter is depleted automatically over time, the player runs out of energy and the game is over. The player can replenish the meter by performing tricks or collecting juice boxes throughout the level, allowing them to continue playing indefinitely. An attribute system allows the player to increase the effectiveness of their skater by using experience gained from completing challenges and performing actions and tricks of that attribute in levels. Increasing attributes allows the player to improve the performance of speed, jumps, spins, grinds, manuals, fakies, and wallrides.

Aggressive Inline features several secondary game modes. The "Tutorial" allows the player to complete 20 lessons to understand gameplay mechanics. In "Freeskate" mode, the player can skate without the Juice Meter in unlocked levels, without being able to complete challenges or upgrade attributes. "Timed Run" mode allows the player to accumulate points for tricks within a time limit in completed levels. The game also supports multiplayer in which two players can complete head-to-head challenges in modes including getting the most points during a run, performing the best trick, and collecting the most hidden items. The game also features a park editor.

The Game Boy Advance version of Aggressive Inline features several differences from the console version. Whilst the player similarly completes challenges across a series of thirteen levels, levels are time-limited, with challenges consisting of objectives including collecting or destroying items, jumping through hoops, and meeting the high score for the stage by accumulating trick points. In addition to the game's main "Arcade" and "Freeskate" modes, two Game Boy Advance players, connected by a Game Link Cable, can compete for the highest score, highest-scoring trick combo, and combo with most tricks.

== Development ==
Aggressive Inline was developed by Z-Axis, a California-based studio founded by Dave Luntz, responsible for several sports titles including the Dave Mirra Freestyle BMX series and Thrasher Presents Skate and Destroy. The game was developed by a team of 25 staff, with publisher Acclaim Entertainment briefing the studio to develop an action sports game based on aggressive inline skating by May 2002. The game was announced in November 2001 under the Acclaim Max Sports division of extreme sports games, renamed to AKA Acclaim before release. During development, the company agreed to acquisition by Tony Hawk's Pro Skater series publisher Activision.

Project manager Randy Condon noted that the developers struggled to fit to the "tight schedule" provided by the publisher due to the "ambitious" scope of the game's design. The development team's experience working on Dave Mirra Freestyle BMX 2 allowed them to expedite development by using the game's engine, tools, and animation system. Several features, including competition stages and receiving bonus points for clearing gaps, were removed due to time constraints. Condon stated that the team "underestimated the work required" for "overwhelming" design tasks, including the "time required to perfect level geometry" and the design and implementation of individual challenges, leading to the simplification and elimination of many challenges in the game. Condon attributed the success of the game's design to the brainstorming and design prototyping completed closely with the game's project leads, including artist Bill Spence, programmer Vince D'Amelio and designer Vince Castillo.

Condon stated the design objectives of Aggressive Inline were to combine the features of the Tony Hawk's Pro Skater series of games based upon the engine used to create Dave Mirra Freestyle BMX 2. The developers experimented with the addition of several innovations novel to the genre at the time, including a skill progression system inspired by role-playing games, and the removal of a fixed time limit in stages to "let players do things at their own pace". The developers also aimed to convey a "strong sense of humor and fun" in the game, designing levels with challenges that would allow players to "unleash havoc" and "alter the world" to expose additional ramps or rails. Announced as Chris Edwards Aggressive Inline, the game features several professional inline skaters, including Chris Edwards, Eito Yasutoko, Franky Morales, Jaren Grob and Taïg Khris. To animate the movement of the skaters and performance of tricks, the developers used motion capture recordings of skaters at Woodward Camp. The developers also implemented a feature described as "dynamic cloth technology" to animate the movement and physics of loose-fitting clothes.

A Game Boy Advance version of Aggressive Inline developed by Full Fat was published by Acclaim in August 2002. Full Fat were an independent development team that had previously worked on a Game Boy Advance port for Dave Mirra Freestyle BMX 2.

== Reception ==
Reception

Aggregate score
Aggregator	Score			
Aggregator	GBA	GameCube	PS2	Xbox
Metacritic	75/100	88/100	85/100	85/100

Review scores
Publication	Score			
Publication	GBA	GameCube	PS2	Xbox
Electronic Gaming Monthly	N/A	N/A	8.33/10	N/A
Eurogamer	N/A	N/A	9/10	N/A
Game Informer	7.75/10	8.75/10	9.25/10	9.25/10
GamePro	N/A	4.5/5	4.5/5	4.5/5
GameSpot	7.2/10	8.8/10	8.8/10	8.8/10
GameSpy	N/A	4.5/5	4/5	4.5/5
GameZone	6.5/10	9.5/10	9/10	9.5/10
IGN	7/10	9.1/10	9.4/10	9.1/10
Nintendo Power	3.9/5	4.3/5	N/A	N/A

Aggressive Inline received "generally favorable reviews", according to the review aggregator website Metacritic on all platforms, with several critics praising the game as a strong competitor to the Tony Hawk's Pro Skater series in the extreme sports genre. Many reviewers expressed that the features in Aggressive Inline were innovative and influential for the next generation of extreme sports titles. GameSpot observed that Aggressive Inline "both borrows from previous alternative sports games and sets out in a new direction that will more than likely be copied by future games", noting "its innovations with regard to timed-run and in-level goal designs are sure to become trends used in the next generation". GameSpy wrote that the "novel gameplay innovations" in the game "raises the bar for the entire extreme sports genre", describing the title as the "next evolutionary step" for the genre.

Critics praised the game's expansive level design and challenges. Describing the game's levels as "really quite huge", GameSpot noted the absence of a "rigid goal structure" allowing the player to "skate around at their own pace". IGN similarly commended the "huge and varied" level design and that each contained its "own distinct feel", describing the levels as "amazing to explore". GamePro highlighted the game's "extremely large but dense" levels, praising their "sense of scope and realism", writing that "the depth and design of each stage (is) addicting...there's so much to see and do in each level." Eurogamer described the game's levels as "larger", "a lot more dynamic", and "designed with a healthy serving of wit and intelligence", noting that the inclusion of unlockable areas was a "clever way of increasing replay value".

Critics were largely positive on the game's visual presentation. Describing the graphics as "gorgeous", GameZone found the game to be "overflowing" with "eye-catching details". GameSpy similarly noted the "look of the game is stunning", writing that "the player movements are fluid and the character models are sharp". IGN highlighted the game's high framerate and animations as "excellent, fluid, smooth and pleasing to the eye", whilst critiquing the character models as a "noticeable shortcoming", describing their design as inconsistent, "low-polygon", and "less realistic". Eurogamer noted the game had inconsistent attention to detail for its character models, praising the game's motion capture animations and "behavior of garments" but faulted the facial features and "angular limbs".

The soundtrack of Aggressive Inline received a mixed reception. IGN described the soundtrack as "fitting enough for the style of game", although with no "particularly new or fresh" music. Electronic Gaming Monthly described the soundtrack as "sub-par". Game Informer expressed annoyance at the soundtrack, writing it needed "more killer, less filler". Eurogamer described the soundtrack as "nothing surprising", with the "usual crop of samey American alternative rock". Whilst noting that the soundtrack was dated, GameZone described the track listing as "great, easy to enjoy songs that you have actually heard of", praising the inclusion of features on the Xbox version enabling players to play custom tracks.

The Game Boy Advance version of Aggressive Inline received less favorable reviews compared to the console release. Whilst describing it as a "good game", GameZone noted that the return to a more traditional gameplay model, including the introduction of a time limit, smaller levels, and simpler gameplay, led the game to "play nothing like" the console release. Game Informer noted that "things like jumping out of grinds and simple navigation are a little rough around the edges". IGN similarly noted that the title "throws out pretty much all of the established gameplay of the console title", and critiqued various minor problems, including collision detection, awkward character models and the greater focus on grinding and rails over vert tricks, although noted the quality of digitized audio from the console version.

=== Accolades ===
Aggressive Inline received nominations for several accolades, including for the 2002 "Outstanding Original Sports Game" by the National Academy of Video Game Trade Reviewers and the 2002 "Console Sports Game of the Year" at the 6th Annual Interactive Achievement Awards. GameSpot nominated the game as the "Game of the Month" in May 2002 and the "Best Alternative Sports Game" across console platforms for 2002.

=== Retrospective reception ===
Retrospective assessments of Aggressive Inline have remained positive. Several critics have remarked that the game introduced several innovations that predated the features of titles in the Tony Hawk's Pro Skater series. In 2006, Edge noted that Aggressive Inline preceded features used in Tony Hawk's Pro Skater 4, including the introduction of career stages without a time limit. Similarly in 2002, the IGN review of Tony Hawk's Pro Skater 4 noted Aggressive Inline offered a "serious challenge" to Neversoft, using it as a point of comparison for several of the new features in the game. Describing the game as a "true breakthrough competitor" to the Tony Hawk's Pro Skater series in 2009, Official PlayStation Magazine praised Aggressive Inline as "addictive" and a "unique, innovative and remarkably fun sports game", highlighting the game's "huge" and "cleverly crafted" stages. In 2019, Eurogamer praised Aggressive Inline as "completely innovative and awesome thanks to its huge playing areas". However, several retrospective articles noted the game was not a commercial success. Categorizing the game as a "flop" in 2004, GMR noted that "while the press loved Aggressive Inline, nobody bought it." Similarly in 2011, Edge classified the game as a "forgotten" title, noting that the game's failure was "quickly overshadowed by the miserably attention-seeking BMX XXX" and because "inline skates never attained the same kind of cultural cachet at skateboards".
