= Dave Mirra Freestyle BMX 3 =

2002 sports video game

- Developer: Full Fat
- Publisher: Acclaim Entertainment
- Series: Dave Mirra Freestyle BMX
- Platform: Game Boy Advance
- Release: NA: November 25, 2002; EU: December 6, 2002
- Genre: Sports (freestyle BMX)
- Modes: Single-player, multiplayer

Dave Mirra Freestyle BMX 3 is a 2002 sports video game developed by Full Fat and published by Acclaim Entertainment for the Game Boy Advance. It was developed in conjunction with the console title BMX XXX, the obscenity of which caused its endorsement by Dave Mirra to be removed. The game received positive reviews from critics.

== Gameplay ==
Dave Mirra Freestyle BMX 3 is a freestyle BMX sports game in which the player controls one of a selection of professional riders such as the titular Dave Mirra, Ryan Nyquist, Colin Mackay, John "Luc-E" Englebert, and Mike Laird; players may also create their own customized rider. The game features eleven levels, in which the player may perform several tricks. The player can purchase new bikes to enhance their performance. Via the Game Link Cable, players can challenge each other in multiplayer modes.

== Development and release ==
Following the commercial success of the first two Dave Mirra Freestyle BMX titles, publisher Acclaim Entertainment announced in April 2002 that it had renewed its exclusive licensing agreement with Dave Mirra for five additional years. On August 19, 2002, Acclaim announced that the M-rated console title BMX XXX, which was a retooled version of Dave Mirra Freestyle BMX 3, would not be endorsed by Mirra, but confirmed that their licensing deal remained intact, with a Dave Mirra Freestyle BMX 3 title planned for release. In September 2002, Acclaim confirmed that Dave Mirra Freestyle BMX 3 was in development for the Game Boy Advance with a planned November release. The game was developed by Full Fat, who previously developed the Game Boy Advance versions of Dave Mirra Freestyle BMX 2 and Aggressive Inline. Like the latter title, the game includes a fully digitized licensed soundtrack featuring bands such as New Found Glory, Green Day, Saliva, and Ten Foot Pole. Dave Mirra Freestyle BMX 3 was shipped to North American retailers on November 25, 2002.

== Reception ==
Reception

Aggregate score
Aggregator	Score
Metacritic	78/100

Review scores
Publication	Score
Game Informer	8.25/10
GamesMaster	81%
GameSpot	8.6/10
GameSpy	3/5
GameZone	8/10
IGN	8/10
Nintendo Power	3.8/5
Nintendo World Report	5.5/10
X-Play	4/5

Dave Mirra Freestyle BMX 3 received "generally favorable reviews" according to video game review aggregator Metacritic.

The game was a runner-up for the "Best Sound on Game Boy Advance" award at GameSpot's Best and Worst of 2002 Awards, which went to Aggressive Inline, from the same developer.
