= BMX XXX =

2002 sports video game

- North American Xbox cover art
- Developer: Z-Axis
- Publisher: Acclaim Entertainment (Note: Released under the AKA Acclaim label.)
- Director: Glen Egan
- Producer: Shawn Rosen
- Designers: Tin Guerrero; Ray Yeomans
- Programmer: David Grace
- Artist: Mark Girouard
- Writer: Warren Graff
- Platforms: Xbox, PlayStation 2, GameCube
- Release: Xbox: NA: November 15, 2002; UK: December 6, 2002; PlayStation 2: NA: November 16, 2002; UK: February 7, 2003; GameCube: NA: November 25, 2002; UK: December 6, 2002
- Genre: Sports (freestyle BMX)
- Modes: Single-player, multiplayer

BMX XXX is a 2002 sports video game developed by Z-Axis and published by Acclaim Entertainment under their AKA Acclaim label for the Xbox, PlayStation 2 and GameCube. While primarily a BMX-based action sports title, the game places a distinct emphasis on off-color and sexual humor, and allows the player to create female characters that are fully topless. The game also features unlockable live-action footage of real-life strippers, courtesy of Scores, a New York-based stripclub.

BMX XXX began development in 2001 as a traditional entry in the Dave Mirra Freestyle BMX series, and was announced as Dave Mirra Freestyle BMX 3. The executives of Z-Axis and Acclaim — influenced by a crowded action sports game market, a dire financial situation, and the commercial success of the Grand Theft Auto series — decided to insert nudity and mature humor into the game to increase publicity and sales. Although Dave Mirra initially supported the pitched concept, his name was eventually removed from the title following the game's unveiling at E3. The development team members were displeased with the change in direction, with some attempting to distance themselves from the production. Despite an aggressive marketing campaign, the game's distribution was impeded by various circumstances: major retailers refused to stock the title, Sony Computer Entertainment refused to publish the PlayStation 2 version unless the topless female nudity was censored, and the game was initially banned in Australia.

Upon release, BMX XXX received mixed reviews from critics, who felt that the game lacked innovation despite its content. Although the control scheme and voice acting were complimented, opinions on the soundtrack were mixed, and reviewers faulted the camera, level design, mission objectives, visuals, and humor. As a result of its limited distribution and loss of celebrity endorsement, BMX XXX was a commercial failure. It subsequently became a factor in a series of lawsuits against Acclaim by Mirra and the company's shareholders, and was cited as one of a number of failures that contributed to Acclaim's 2004 bankruptcy and liquidation.

== Gameplay ==
An example of gameplay in BMX XXX; exemplifying the game's emphasis on humor, the player is engaged in a mission involving the delivery of diapered monkeys to a hippie protestor.

BMX XXX is a freestyle BMX sports game with an emphasis on off-color and sexual humor. The player character can be customized by name, gender, and physical attributes, or selected from a number of pre-made characters; the ability to create topless female riders is enabled when the single-player campaign is fully completed. The player's rider can perform a variety of tricks in midair with the combined input of a direction on the D-pad or left thumbstick and a button. The player can also grind on rails, ledges, or other likely surfaces, and can exit a grind by jumping into the air or falling out of balance. The player is awarded points by performing complete tricks and landing while the bike is properly oriented. The player character will be ejected from their bike if they are not oriented for a successful landing or if they crash into something with a part of the body or bike other than their feet, wheels, or grind pegs during a trick. The player character will also be ejected if they are riding off-balance and hit an obstacle too fast or at a harsh angle. In the event of a crash, the player's score is reset.

The single-player campaign is divided into eight levels, six of which are based on a series of challenges that the player must complete to advance to the next level. Challenges are often initiated by interacting with a character within the level, who will give the player an objective to fulfill. Completing ten challenges within a level will grant access to the next level. Scattered within each level are four collectible bike parts; accumulating complete sets of six parts within the campaign unlocks upgraded bikes that enhance the player's performance. Each level also features a series of 45 collectibles such as coins, as well as 20 gaps in the terrain to discover. Completing certain challenges unlocks full-motion video sequences of strippers, with videos unlocked in later levels displaying an increasing amount of nudity. Two of the levels are competitions that require the player to perform a variety of tricks and earn a medal.

The game includes three multiplayer modes in which two human players compete against each other. In "Strip Challenge", players aim to achieve the highest-scoring trick combination. When a player breaks the record, the opponent's character loses a piece of clothing, and the game ends when one player renders their opponent naked. In "Skillz", players compete to achieve the highest score over a two-minute run, and in "Paintball", one player must collect all the boomboxes within a level while their opponent attempts to snipe them.

== Development ==
In 2001, Dave Mirra Freestyle BMX developer Z-Axis began production on the third installment of the series, aiming to expand the technology and include such features as a story, voice-acting, and mission-based gameplay. Lead artist Mark Girouard described the game's original narrative as centering on a BMX team on tour throughout the United States. In January 2002, series publisher Acclaim Entertainment announced Dave Mirra Freestyle BMX 3, which would have showcased freestyle BMX rider Dave Mirra alongside sixteen other professionals.

For an extreme sports game, I gotta be honest, it made absolutely no sense. But it was an interesting idea and the amount of people that were talking about it, the amount of people that were excited about it really surprised us.

— BMX XXX executive producer Shawn Rosen, reflecting on the game's concept and the publicity generated by it

Around this time, the action sports genre had become crowded, prompting executives of Z-Axis and Acclaim to ponder new angles for increasing publicity. During a meeting between the parties, someone suggested adding strippers to the game in jest. While this initially elicited laughter, the group began seriously considering the idea, with Acclaim hoping that appealing to an older audience would increase sales. Acclaim marketing coordinator Zach Smith noted that the company's decision to insert nudity in the game was influenced by their dire financial situation at the time, and Acclaim executive producer Shawn Rosen additionally cited the commercial success of the Grand Theft Auto series as the catalyst for backing an adult-oriented title. Director Glen Egan acknowledged the increasing success of M-rated games, and was encouraged to pursue the rating by his irritation at having to excise drug references and profanity from the soundtracks of the previous two Dave Mirra titles. Acclaim director of public relations Alan Lewis commented that the aging gamer demographic made adult humor essential in appealing to audiences that began their hobby in earlier generations.

In March 2002, Mirra and Acclaim began discussions about attaching his name to the title, which Mirra felt would be a more tongue-in-cheek and mature game comparable to the parodic film Airplane!. Rosen claimed that while Mirra found the pitched concept humorous, sponsors warned Mirra that the game would be harmful to his image. Acclaim looked to sex comedies and Jackass as inspiration for the game's sexual humor and raunchy dialogue. Egan also cited Bam Margera's Camp Kill Yourself video series as an influence on the game's bold and irreverent humor and action. For the game, Acclaim formed a partnership with the New York-based stripclub Scores, with footage of its employees being included as unlockable content. Lead designer Tin Guerrero postulated that this decision was influenced by the popularity of Howard Stern at the time, with Scores apparently being his favorite stripclub. The footage was filmed by Acclaim without Z-Axis's involvement.

The game's change in direction required Z-Axis's development team to redesign a significant amount of content they had completed thus far, retooling what would have been Dave Mirra Freestyle BMX 3 into Dave Mirra BMX XXX. The team members were dismayed by the decision, with Girouard recalling it as "the biggest creative shock I've ever experienced in games through all these years". Some members tried to distance themselves from the production by leaving their full names out of the credits, opting to either abbreviate their surnames or use the names of historical figures such as Fletcher Christian. The team was unable to object due to the company management's support of the direction and their multi-game contractual obligation to Acclaim concerning the Dave Mirra series. Despite being frustrated by their circumstance, the development team would not work perfunctorily, and remained driven to create a satisfying game. The game runs on the same engine previously used by Z-Axis's Aggressive Inline. The script was written by Happy Tree Friends co-creator Warren Graff, who wrote nearly 500 pages of dialogue for the game's characters.

On August 19, 2002, Acclaim announced that Dave Mirra's name had been removed from the title, and that he and the other professional riders, as well as licensed equipment, would not be featured in the game. Jeff Gerstmann of GameSpot speculated that the move was made by Acclaim to preserve creative control over the game's content while preventing damage to the images of the previously involved riders and equipment manufacturers. While Egan was perplexed by Acclaim's decision considering Mirra's supposed importance to the property, Guerrero alleged a souring relationship between Acclaim and Mirra as a factor. Regardless, Acclaim's licensing deal with Mirra stood intact, with a Dave Mirra Freestyle BMX 3 title planned for release. The game would be released for the Game Boy Advance on November 25, 2002.

== Marketing and release ==
Dave Mirra BMX XXX was showcased at E3 in May 2002. IGN PS2, in its "Best of E3 2002 Awards", named it runner-up in the "Biggest Surprise" category, describing it as "a surprise in every sense of the word" and proclaiming that "any title that's working hard to perfect 'Boob-Jiggle Technology' deserves a questionable double take".

In September 2002, a rumor circulated that Sony Computer Entertainment would not approve the PlayStation 2 (PS2) version of the game unless certain sexual content was removed. On November 4, Acclaim representatives Alan Lewis and Tara Blanco confirmed the rumor, stating that the PS2 version would be edited to eliminate the topless nudity. An anonymous Sony representative claimed that the topless female imagery posed a detrimental threat to Sony's console brand, and believed that it was not fundamentally crucial to the gameplay experience.

Acclaim launched an aggressive $3-4 million advertising campaign for the game, featuring irreverent jokes and the tagline "This is BMX?". On October 17, 2002, Acclaim unveiled the game's soundtrack, which consists of a mixture of classic and modern rock and hip hop. On November 7, Acclaim launched a "Ms. BMX XXX" competition, in which female contestants submitted a digital photo of themselves or a friend, which was subject to a public vote. The winner was flown to New York City and escorted to Scores by Gary Dell'Abate and K.C. Armstrong of The Howard Stern Show.

On October 14, 2002, Reuters reported that Walmart, Toys "R" Us, and KB Toys had refused to stock the title. Although Guerrero regarded Walmart's motion as a "dagger blow", he found humor in the retailer's contemporary distribution of guns and ammunition. BMX XXX was released in North America for the Xbox on November 15, 2002, for the PlayStation 2 on November 16, and for the GameCube on November 25. In the United Kingdom, it was released for GameCube and Xbox on December 6 and for the PlayStation 2 on February 7, 2003. It would be Z-Axis's last game for Acclaim before their acquisition by Activision, which was announced at the same time as the game's unveiling at E3. Those who pre-ordered the game from EB Games or GameStop received a free t-shirt. The game was initially banned in Australia, but was released in the country after the removal of its sexual content.

== Reception ==
Reception

Aggregate score
Aggregator	Score		
Aggregator	GameCube	PS2	Xbox
Metacritic	60/100	54/100	58/100

Review scores
Publication	Score		
Publication	GameCube	PS2	Xbox
AllGame	N/A	N/A	2/5
Electronic Gaming Monthly	N/A	N/A	2.5/10, 3/10, 3.5/10
Eurogamer	N/A	N/A	4/10
Game Informer	7.75/10	7.75/10	7.75/10
GamePro	N/A	3/5	3/5
GameSpot	5.4/10	5.4/10	5.4/10
GameSpy	2.5/5	N/A	81/100
GameZone	N/A	6.2/10	N/A
IGN	6.8/10	6/10	6.8/10
Nintendo Power	17.5/25	N/A	N/A
Nintendo World Report	5/10	N/A	N/A
Official U.S. PlayStation Magazine	N/A	1.5/5	N/A
TeamXbox	N/A	N/A	3.3/5
X-Play	N/A	N/A	1/5
Entertainment Weekly	C−	C−	C−
Playboy	77%	77%	77%

BMX XXX received "mixed or average" reviews on all platforms according to video game review aggregator Metacritic, with some reviewers concluding that the game was lacking in innovation outside of its vulgarity and sexual content. Todd Zuniga of Official U.S. PlayStation Magazine further denounced the game as "the worst example of what PS2 games are capable of", and described it as milquetoast in all gameplay aspects. However, Steve Steinberg of GameSpy and the reviewers of Nintendo Power considered it to be a solid gaming experience despite its crude content, with Steinberg pointing out that the game's "twisted novelty" could not function in other genres, and worked because of the game's fundamental playability. Scott Steinberg of Playboy also opined that the title was at its strongest outside of its comedic elements, attributing the gameplay's refinements over the course of a more mundane franchise.

The control scheme was mostly found to be comfortable and intuitive, though Bryn Williams of GameSpy and Justin Nation of Planet GameCube considered the stunt system to be simplified compared to other extreme sports titles such as Tony Hawk's Pro Skater 4. Although Jeff Gerstmann of GameSpot was impressed by the variety of tricks, he felt that none of them seemed special or important, and pointed out that the game engine's unrealistic quirks reduced the sense of challenge. Scott Alan Marriott of AllGame, Dan Leahy of Electronic Gaming Monthly, and AM Urbanek of Extended Play observed a lack of inertia in the player's bike, which contributed to a sense of inconsistency in the controls. Although Steve Steinberg commended the camera as solid and logically placed, others criticized it as jumpy and jerky, with Marriott and IGN's Matt Casamassina citing a tendency to bounce off walls and barriers, and Zuniga expressing frustration at having to stop the bike to look around.

The levels were said to not be as large and creative as those in Z-Axis's previous efforts, and their design was faulted as barren, with an abundance of spaces bereft of features. Reviewers complained of the vague challenge objectives, which were exacerbated by the lack of any source of direction or orientation; Steve Steinberg and Gerstmann cited a specific instance of an early mission that tasked the player with running down a "fruitbooter" while giving no indication that the term is derogatory slang for an inline skater. The necessity of returning to a non-player character's position to retry a failed challenge was an additional annoyance, with Matt Helgeson of Game Informer noting that the characters do not always stay at their post. Helgeson, fellow Game Informer reviewer Justin Leeper, and Aaron Boulding of IGN were unenthused by the high amount of scavenger hunt missions, though Leeper found some objectives humorous, and Casamassina complimented their presentation. Socrates of TeamXbox enjoyed the multiplayer mode, but felt that the lack of the single-player campaign's lewdness made the mode feel indistinct from other extreme sports titles. Steve Steinberg was uneased by the Paintball mode, and wondered how it was left intact after several games were delayed or reworked after the September 11 attacks. The stripper videos were noted to be insufficiently explicit for the "XXX" title, and reviewers felt that they were too difficult to unlock to be worth the effort, particularly for adults who have easier means to access explicit content.

Assessments of the visuals were generally unfavorable, with some reviewers finding them comparable to a PSone title. While the animation and frame rate were commended for their smoothness, the characters were criticized for their blocky models, stiff body movements, and blurry textures. Some pointed out that the rough character models worked against the game's attempt at sex appeal, with Tom Bramwell of Eurogamer remarking that "not since Orchid in the original Killer Instinct have I seen such angular assets". Nation further observed that a topless female biker in a third-person video game served little function beyond novelty due to the camera's position behind her back as well as her hunched position. Dan Amrich of GamePro and Casamassina cited occasional collision issues in which riders temporarily sink through the ground or a wall. While Gerstmann and Casamassina described the environments as large in scope, Nick Valentino of GameZone felt that they were not as large or impressive as those in Aggressive Inline, and he and Bramwell found some areas to be plain and uninteresting. Marriott noticed some distant pop-up, and felt that the rider customization was insufficiently extensive. Socrates commented that the environments "look like they have been coated in a layer of Vaseline", and he considered the stripper videos to be the game's best-looking element. Boulding and Valentino also complimented the videos' professional quality, with Boulding stating that they "might convince you that you're watching an episode of G String Divas but without all of that talking and emoting". Nation, however, determined the production to be low-budget, saying that it "looks like it was copied off of a copy of an older Super 8 tape".

The soundtrack was classified as a combination of rock, punk, hip hop and ska that was typical of the extreme sports genre, with Casamassina remarking that the selections, though well-executed, "seem to appear on every extreme sports soundtrack in the universe". While Marriott, Amrich, and fellow GamePro reviewer Tokyo Drifter admired the soundtrack, Bramwell and Helgeson were not taken with it, with Bramwell being thankful for the Xbox version's option to insert a custom playlist. Valentino found the background music's downplayed prominence odd, and Gerstmann was perplexed by the soundtrack's editing of racial slurs and drug references considering the marketing campaign's emphasis on obscenity. Boulding was annoyed by an audio flaw that caused custom playlists to start again from the first track any time the music was paused for a gameplay reason, such as initiating a challenge. The sound effects were regarded as unremarkable and monotonous. Reactions to the voice acting were mostly positive, with Socrates elaborating that the humorous voices and accents successfully conveyed the game's light-hearted tone, though Boulding and Urbanek noted that the game's small pool of actors was evident, and the commentary from pedestrians was derided as repetitive. Marriott and Gerstmann were more negative, describing the voice-overs as grating and detrimental to the game's attempts at humor.

The humor was generally dismissed as juvenile and off-putting, though Williams and Casamassina found some of the jokes effective. Helgeson remarked that the content was "nothing that would raise an eyebrow on HBO", and concluded that those who were old enough to purchase the title would be too old to be shocked by it. Urbanek also saw irony in the demographic that he believed would find the game funny being too young to purchase it. Nation elaborated that the game's jokes, on top of being tired, were lacking in context and delivery, and he concurred that the game's lack of sophistication in its humor or sexual content, combined with the unremarkable gameplay, left its audience unclear. Marriott deemed the concept of a Mature-rated sports title nonsensical, and found the game's presentation of a seedy urban tone unpleasant, proclaiming that "being bombarded with obnoxious vendors and annoying pedestrians everywhere you turn should be considered a form of mental anguish". Nation, Zuniga and Urbanek accused the game's content of misogyny and racism, with Nation pondering "Why objectify women and stereotype several races and social classes so callously, taking a ton of criticism in the process, and then settle for such a poor excuse for a pay-off on all levels?".

== Legacy ==
In February 2003, Mirra filed a $20 million lawsuit against Acclaim claiming that BMX XXX damaged his image. He explained that Acclaim allegedly used his name and likeness to promote BMX XXX after both parties agreed to disassociate his name from the product. The suit comprised a total of 11 claims, including unfair competition and injury to business reputation and dilution. Acclaim's public relations director Alan Lewis denounced the lawsuit as baseless and declared that Acclaim would fight vigorously against it. In the following month, two additional lawsuits were filed by Acclaim's shareholders alleging that the company's management misled it and the public on five accounts of misinformation relevant to the company's operations, including inadequate disclosure of the company's plans to publish mature-themed games. The suits claimed that titles such as BMX XXX "materially impeded the company's ability to access broad-based retail channels" and damaged revenue projections. On October 27, 2003, Acclaim announced that Mirra's suit had been settled with no monetary or other damages being paid by either side, and that Mirra's licensing agreement would continue until 2011. Additionally, Acclaim confirmed the development of a new Dave Mirra BMX game for next-generation systems.

The game's limited distribution and loss of celebrity endorsement resulted in BMX XXX becoming Acclaim's lowest-selling BMX title to date. According to Egan, the game sold a little over 160,000 copies by December 2005, making slightly under $5 million in its lifetime. The financial failure and lack of mass market appeal of BMX XXX among other titles was cited as a factor in Acclaim's 2004 bankruptcy and liquidation. Rosen left Acclaim soon after the game's release and eventually abandoned the video game industry, having established a koi pond business by 2017.

GameSpy included the game's conception and Acclaim's violation of its agreement not to use Mirra's name and likeness to promote the game in its list of "25 Dumbest Moments in Gaming". Mike Williams of USgamer, within his list of "10 Games That Killed a Franchise", deemed BMX XXX and Turok: Evolution to be the "two nails in Acclaim's coffin". In 2015, the game was among several titles banned from streaming by Twitch. Todd Ciolek of IGN, in a retrospective feature covering major game publisher blunders, described BMX XXX as Acclaim's "last cry for attention" in a series of desperate publicity stunts by the financially ailing company.
