= Mike Laird =

American professional BMX rider (born 1974)

- Born: July 1, 1974; Portsmouth, Virginia, U.S.
- Occupation: professional BMX rider
- Height: 5 ft 10 in (178 cm)

Mike Laird (born July 1, 1974, Portsmouth, Virginia) is an American former professional BMX rider. He won the PlayStation Trick of the Year Award during the first ever AST Dew Tour and was nominated for pulling a double tailwhip 360 in the BMX Park Finals at Denver's Right Guard Open. He was a character in Dave Mirra's BMX video game series. He is the owner and fabricator of lairdframe, a custom geometry bicycle company specializing in jagged edged bridged chromoly and titanium frames.

== Media appearances ==
- Dave Mirra Freestyle BMX (video game) (PlayStation (console))
- Dave Mirra Freestyle BMX 2 (PlayStation 2 and Xbox (console))
- Dave Mirra Freestyle BMX 3 (Game Boy Advance)

== Sponsors ==
- Eastern Bikes
- Useless Clothes
- Nirve Bikes
- Vans Shoes
- Huffy Bikes
- Fox Racing
- Mirraco
