= Mat Hoffman's Pro BMX =

2001 video game

- Developer: Shaba Games (Note: Ported to several platforms by the following developers: Dreamcast version by Runecraft, Game Boy Color & Game Boy Advance versions by HotGen, and Windows version by LTI Gray Matter.)
- Publisher: Activision (Note: Released under the Activision O2 brand.)
- Platforms: PlayStation; Game Boy Color; Dreamcast; Windows; Game Boy Advance
- Release: PlayStation, Game Boy Color: NA: May 15, 2001; EU: May 25, 2001 (PS); EU: June 15, 2001 (GBC); Dreamcast: NA: September 12, 2001; Windows: NA: October 1, 2001; Game Boy Advance: NA: November 20, 2001; EU: November 30, 2001
- Genre: Sports
- Modes: Single-player, multiplayer

Mat Hoffman's Pro BMX is a 2001 BMX video game developed by Shaba Games and the first game to be published by Activision under the Activision O2 label. It is similar to the Tony Hawk's series and competed directly with Acclaim Entertainment's Dave Mirra Freestyle BMX. Despite a planned release in fall of 2000, the game was released in 2001 for the PlayStation and Game Boy Color, followed by Dreamcast, Microsoft Windows and Game Boy Advance. The PlayStation and Dreamcast versions received "favorable" reviews, while the PC and Game Boy Advance versions received "average" reviews. A sequel, Mat Hoffman's Pro BMX 2, was released in 2002.

== Development ==
Following the success of Tony Hawk's Pro Skater, Activision looked to expand its line of video games to other extreme sports outside of just skateboarding. Mat Hoffman's Pro BMX would be the first of such efforts. A demo version of the game is available in the options menu in the PlayStation version of Tony Hawk's Pro Skater 2 which features two BMX riders and a beta version of the finished game's first level. Despite a "fall 2000" release listed in the demo, the game would be delayed until its eventual release in May 2001, nearly eight months after Dave Mirra Freestyle BMX was released.

== Gameplay ==
Mat Hoffman's Pro BMX uses a tweaked version of the game engine used in a similar video game, Tony Hawk's Pro Skater. The goal of the game is to successfully perform and combine different tricks on a BMX bike, with successful executions adding to the player's score. The point value of the trick is based on time maintained, degrees rotated, number of tricks performed in sequence, and the number of times the tricks have been used (the more often a trick is used, the less it's worth). Successful tricks also add to the player's special meter, which, once full, allows for the execution of "signature moves" which are worth more than normal tricks. Grinds, lip tricks, and manuals (wheelies) are included in the game to help the player link tricks together into combos. Bails (falling off the bike due to poor landing) cause for no points to be awarded for the attempted trick or combo, and resets the special bar to empty.

The player can play as one of eight different professional BMX riders, including Mat Hoffman, Rick Thorne, Dennis McCoy, Kevin Robinson and Mike Escamilla. Tony Hawk is featured as a hidden character, as is a fictional elderly character named "Granny". Each rider has their own individual stats, bikes, and trick-sets.

Ten levels exist in the game (including two remade levels from Pro Skater), consisting of street, vert, and dirt track-oriented courses. Secret areas, point-bonuses, and many breakable objects are scattered amongst the levels.

=== Game modes ===
Career Mode — In Career Mode, the player has five magazine covers (i.e. objectives) to obtain in six of the eight levels. The player has only two minutes in which to obtain a cover after which their run ends; however, individual objectives are marked off once completed. In each level, two of the covers are acquired by reaching set scores (with the second score being two to three times the amount required for the first), one is obtained by collecting the five letters to spell "T-R-I-C-K", one is a hidden cover which the player must find in the level, and one requirement varies from level to level, but always involves doing something to five objects (e.g., "smash five lights"). The other two levels are competitions, where the goal is to receive a gold, silver, or bronze medal by ranking higher than the other riders. In these levels, the basis for ranking is not the player's score, but the mean number of points given on a scale of one to ten by three computer AI judges after three sets. Advancing in Career mode allows the player to unlock new levels, bikes, and secret riders.

Single Session — In this mode, the player chooses a BMX rider, an available bike, and available level, and rides for a two-minute session in an attempt to set a high score. While similar to the two-minute session in career mode, there are no specific goals for the player to attempt.

Free Ride — Free Ride is similar to the Single Session mode; the player chooses a BMX rider, an available bike, and an available level. Instead of a two-minute timer, however, there is no time limit, allowing the player to practice or simply explore, searching for gaps and secrets areas.

Multiplayer modes — The game features several split-screen multi-player modes including Trick Attack, Horse, and Graffiti.

Park Editor — This mode allows the player to create their own level by arranging various ramps, rails, and other pieces. Gaps can be created and named, and the player's starting positions can also be chosen by the player. Once a created park is finished, the level can be accessed in the game's "Single Session", "Free Ride", and multiplayer modes. Five pre-made parks, which were created using Park Editor, were included in the game as samples of the editor's potential.

== Reception ==
Reception

Aggregate scores
Aggregator	Score				
Aggregator	Dreamcast	GBA	GBC	PC	PS
GameRankings	79%	67%	77%	73%	80%
Metacritic	75/100	71/100	N/A	73/100	80/100

Review scores
Publication	Score				
Publication	Dreamcast	GBA	GBC	PC	PS
Computer Gaming World	N/A	N/A	N/A	3/5	N/A
Electronic Gaming Monthly	7.5/10	4.5/10 (Note: Two critics of Electronic Gaming Monthly gave the Game Boy Advance version each a score of 5/10, and the other gave it 3.5/10.)	N/A	N/A	7.83/10 (Note: Two critics of Electronic Gaming Monthly gave the PlayStation version each a score of 7.5/10, and the other gave it 8.5/10.)
EP Daily	7/10	N/A	N/A	7.5/10	N/A
Game Informer	7/10	7.5/10	N/A	N/A	8.5/10
GameRevolution	N/A	N/A	N/A	N/A	C+
GameSpot	7.6/10	8.1/10	7.9/10	7.8/10	7.8/10
GameSpy	8/10	66%	N/A	N/A	N/A
GameZone	8.5/10	N/A	N/A	8/10	9.3/10
IGN	8.1/10	8.6/10	8/10	7.2/10	7.8/10
Next Generation	N/A	N/A	N/A	N/A	3/5
Nintendo Power	N/A	3.2/5	3/5	N/A	N/A
Nintendo World Report	N/A	6.5/10	N/A	N/A	N/A
Official U.S. PlayStation Magazine	N/A	N/A	N/A	N/A	4/5
PC Gamer (US)	N/A	N/A	N/A	71%	N/A
BBC Sport	N/A	N/A	N/A	N/A	79%
The Cincinnati Enquirer	N/A	N/A	N/A	N/A	4/5

The PlayStation and Dreamcast versions received "favorable" reviews, while the PC and Game Boy Advance versions received "average" reviews, according to video game review aggregator Metacritic. Jeff Lundrigan of NextGen said of the former console version: "Even two years later, the Tony Hawk engine makes a monkey out of the likes of Razor Freestyle Scooter – which is, weirdly enough, this game's only immediate competition on PlayStation."

The Cincinnati Enquirer gave the PlayStation version a score of four stars out of five, saying that "players can create their own custom BMX tracks with the bundled 3-D course editor, offering more than 100 variations of ramps, rails and other obstacles." Maxim gave the same console version a similar score of eight out of ten, saying that "extreme-sports poseurs can break a femur in solo and multiplayer modes; master the controls and you’ll open new venues by performing death-defying stunts that’d make Evel Knievel wet his bedpan. Despite a trick roster with some troubling names (anyone care to attempt a "Rocket Queen"?), this is as down and dirty as they come. Detergent not included." BBC Sport gave the similar console version a score of 79%, saying: "If you like rock music to accompany your efforts, this has some of the best with even the Stone Roses lending their tracks." Extended Play gave it a score of three stars out of five, saying: "The levels aren't the greatest around, and it's not quite as solid as THPS, but "Mat Hoffman's Pro BMX" is better than THQ and Acclaim's freestyle bike games. It's easy to slip into and fun to play. At the same time however, because "Hoffman's Pro BMX" piggybacks on the THPS engine, they're very similar, and if you've started to get bored with "Tony Hawk's", you might want to try out Matt Hoffman's before you pick it up." Edge similarly gave it six out of ten, stating that the game "offers more realism, while Mirra delivers a marginally better, if arcadey, experience. Both entertain in differing fashions. Then again, you could always wait for the next-gen versions." In Japan, where the same console version was ported and published by Success on September 5, 2002, Famitsu gave it a score of 26 out of 40.

Jon Thompson of AllGame gave the GBC version four stars out of five, saying that it "tries hard to live up to its big brother on the PlayStation, and it does a pretty good job of it, surprisingly. A diverse trick set is hampered only by stuffy controls, and the levels themselves are visually pleasing and fun to play. Hopefully, this is a sign of better things to come for the portable market." The same website gave the GBA and PC versions each three-and-a-half stars out of five, with Michael L. House saying of the former: "As an extreme sport that fills a specific niche, Mat Hoffman's Pro BMX will appeal more to bikers who've had hands-on experiences than casual gamers looking for a fun sport with less subjective scoring and easier controls"; and Thompson saying of the latter: "The host of different riders, bikes, and levels come together to create a cohesive package, and with the relative dearth of quality extreme sports games on the PC, the title is worthwhile. If you've played the game in console form, you won't find anything new here, but fans will find it undeniably fun." Scott Steinberg of Computer Games Magazine gave the same PC version three-and-a-half stars out of five, calling it "Breezy, lightweight entertainment at best. As a quick coffee break-style diversion, the product succeeds well enough."

Dan Elektro of GamePro's July 2001 issue said of the PlayStation version, "If you're choosing between Mat and Mirra, there's no contest: Hoffman's gameplay and mechanics are much more fun. Between Hawk and Hoffman, well, THPS2 has the edge – but if you're specifically looking for two-wheeled thrills, Mat Hoffman's Pro BMX is the game to get." (Note: GamePro gave the PlayStation version three 4/5 scores for graphics, control, and fun factor, and 4.5/5 for sound.) Four issues later, he called the Dreamcast version "an adequate port of a decent game, and as the Dreamcast software pool dries up, beggars can't be choosers. It's a shame nothing was done to take advantage of the Dreamcast specifically, but Mat Hoffman's Pro BMX stands as a fine game worth renting." (Note: GamePro gave the Dreamcast version two 3.5/5 scores for graphics and fun factor, and two 3/5 scores for sound and control.) Another issue later, however, Star Dingo said that the Game Boy Advance version "contains the wide variety of Career Mode goals and big bag of fun tricks you're used to. Even though they feel a little canned and inorganic, most of the stunts are easy to execute, thanks in part to a great tutorial mode. It's just too bad Mat Hoffman has such a tough act to follow." (Note: GamePro gave the Game Boy Advance version three 3.5/5 scores for graphics, sound, and fun factor, and 3/5 for control.)

The game was a runner-up for the "Best Music" award at GameSpot's Best and Worst of 2001 Awards, which went to Metal Gear Solid 2: Sons of Liberty.
