= Flick Soccer! =

2011 video game

- Developer(s): Full Fat
- Platform(s): iOS
- Release: August 11, 2011
- Genre(s): Sports

Flick Soccer! is an iOS game developed by Full Fat and released on August 11, 2011. It is part of the Flick iOS franchise, which includes Flick Golf! and Zombie Flick.

== Gameplay ==
Players flick a soccer ball into goalposts using their finger.

== Critical reception ==
The game has a Metacritic score of 84% based on 8 critic reviews.

SlidetoPlay said "It's incredibly fun to leave the goalie eating grass while your soccer ball soars perfectly into the net. You'll constantly be trying to beat your last high score, or you can use Game Center's online leaderboards to see how your flicks compare to others." AppSmile wrote "Using targets, bonuses, and a variety of game modes, Flick Soccer! has plenty of enjoyable content to keep us bending it like Beckham for months to come." 148Apps said "Flick Soccer is a ton of fun, easy to play, and easy to get lost in. This is definitely one of my new favorite iOS games." AppSpy said "Much like Flick Golf!, Flick Soccer! manages to capture some of the essence of the original sport while giving it a fun arcade spin. Be careful because your time can easily melt away with this one." Edge Magazine said "Is it better than Flick Kick Football? It lacks the purity of PikPok's original, and isn't nearly so charming. But where Flick Kick lapses into formula after you reach a high enough score, Flick Soccer gets even more challenging – and in full flow, it can provide a magical experience." Eurogamer wrote "If you haven't already given yourself carpal tunnel syndrome playing these games, then Flick Soccer is a great place to start. It's hardly a masterclass in reinvention, but just like Flick Golf, the tough part is finding the time to stop playing." TouchArcade described it as "Another solid – though not groundbreaking – entry."
