= NBA Live 96 =

1995 video game

- North American PlayStation box art, featuring Shaquille O' Neal
- Developer: EA Canada (Note: Credited as Hitmen Productions; Tiertex Design Studios developed the Game Boy version.)
- Publishers: EA Sports; Game Boy; THQ
- Composers: Traz Damji; Steve Royea (Genesis); Jeff van Dyck (SNES)
- Series: NBA Live
- Engine: Virtual Stadium
- Platforms: Super NES, Sega Genesis/Mega Drive, Game Boy, PlayStation, MS-DOS
- Release: October 1995: Super NES; NA: October 1995 Genesis/Mega Drive; EU: November 8, 1995; NA: 1995 Game Boy; NA: March 1996 PlayStation; NA: March 27, 1996
- Genre: Sports (basketball)
- Modes: Single-player, multiplayer

NBA Live 96 is the second installment of the NBA Live video game series, released by EA Sports in 1995. The PC and PlayStation covers feature Shaquille O'Neal of the Orlando Magic, while the Super Nintendo Entertainment System, Sega Genesis and European PlayStation box covers feature a photo of the tip-off to Game 1 of the 1995 NBA Finals. The PlayStation and PC versions are the first games in the series to feature 3D-rendered courts, allowing for multiple camera angles using EA's "Virtual Stadium" technology, which is also used for FIFA Soccer 96. On-court player graphics remain 2D sprites. It is also the first NBA Live game released for the PlayStation and the only NBA Live game for the Game Boy. NBA Live 96 was followed by NBA Live 97.

== Gameplay ==
- Live 96 introduces Free Agent pool and Create-a-Player to the series. To meet release deadlines, the latter feature was not included in the PlayStation version.
- This is the first NBA Live title to utilize Virtual Stadium Technology and multiple camera angles.
- Though Michael Jordan and Charles Barkley are not included due to licensing issues, they exist as hidden players in the console versions, which can be unlocked by entering their surnames (along with the surnames of various legends and rookies from the draft class of 1995) in Create-a-Player.

== Development ==
The player sprites were rendered on Silicon Graphics workstations.

== Reception ==
Reception

Review scores
Publication	Score
Electronic Gaming Monthly	8.75/10 (PS1)
Next Generation	5/5 (GEN); 4/5 (SNES, PS1)

A review of the Genesis version in Next Generation gave strong approval to the game's new features, particularly the post-up move and the create-a-player feature. They concluded, "While the action and graphics in Slam 'N' Jam ... for 3DO are still superior, NBA Live '96 for the Genesis is the best basketball simulation out there, anywhere." Next Generation said of the SNES version that "the game's essential lack of defensive play and offensive strategy make this cart pale in comparison to Genesis' version as a simulator." The reviewer elaborated that players can easily score with repeated dunks in the SNES version, and concluded that the game, though the best SNES basketball game yet released, pales against the Genesis version. GamePro said the SNES version "is bigger and badder than previous versions on the SNES, and it's the first to be comparable to the acclaimed Genesis versions of the past." They praised the new features, excellent controls, improved graphics, and "jammin' soundtrack". They found the Genesis version inferior to the SNES version with its smaller sprites, fewer colors, and less smooth opening music, but still outstanding in absolute terms.

GamePro was less enamored of the PlayStation version, stating that the removal of the create-a-player feature seen in earlier versions of the game, the substandard graphics, and the erratic camera make it an overall mediocre effort. They remarked that this version fails to measure up to NBA ShootOut, which released in the same month. The two sports reviewers of Electronic Gaming Monthly agreed that the graphics were not up to PlayStation standards, but maintained it to be the best basketball game on the market, rating it 9.0 and 8.5 out of 10. Next Generation also felt it was better than NBA ShootOut, praising its vast array of options, features, and plays, though they criticized the unrealistic physics. They concluded, "Even EA admits that as far as technically innovative basketball games go, it's way behind Sony Interactive, Konami, even Crystal Dynamics. But when it comes to gameplay, NBA Live '96 is the most consuming basketball game on the market."

In 1996, Next Generation listed the Genesis version of NBA Live 96 as 76th on their "Top 100 Games of All Time" list, commenting that "none do a better job than NBA Live '96 at managing to balance the offensive nature of the sport while incorporating the important defensive and strategic elements."
