= Fox College Hoops =

- Also known as: Fox Primetime Hoops (Saturday Primetime games); CBB on Fox; Fox College Basketball Friday (Friday primetime games)
- Genre: College basketball game telecasts
- Presented by: Tim Brando; Sloane Martin; Connor Onion; Kevin Kugler; Alex Faust; Brandon Gaudin; Adam Amin; Gus Johnson; Lisa Byington; Rob Stone; Mike Hill; Donny Marshall; Jim Jackson; Casey Jacobsen; Stephen Bardo; Bill Raftery; Jim Spanarkel; Nick Bahe
- Country of origin: United States
- Original language: English
- No. of seasons: 6

Production
- Production locations: Various NCAA arenas (game telecasts); Fox Network Center, Los Angeles, California (studio segments, pregame and postgame shows)
- Camera setup: Multi-camera
- Running time: 120 minutes or until game ends
- Production company: Fox Sports

Original release
- Network: Fox (2013–present); Fox Sports Networks (1996–2019); Fox College Sports (2006–2019); FS1 (2013–present); FS2 (2013–present)
- Release: November 1, 2013 – present

Related
- Fox Primetime Hoops

Fox College Hoops (also known as Fox CBB, or Fox Primetime Hoops for Saturday primetime games and Fox College Basketball Friday for Friday primetime games) is the branding used for Fox Sports broadcasts of college basketball for Fox, FS1 and FS2. Historically, college basketball telecasts have also been carried by the Fox Sports Networks (FSN) and FX in the past (sometimes generically under the title College Hoops), the Fox College Hoops branding was introduced in 2013.

Games on Fox and FS1 include rights to the Big East, Big Ten, Big 12 and Mountain West as well as the early-season Fort Myers Tip-Off, Las Vegas Invitational, Crossroads Classic and Las Vegas Classic.

== History ==
In 2013, Fox reached a 12-year deal to broadcast games from the Big East Conference (whose non-football schools had broken away from the conference under the Big East name, with the remainder becoming the American Athletic Conference). CBS Sports sub-licensed rights to additional Big East games, mostly airing on CBS Sports Network.

Since 2014, as part of its contract with the conference, Fox holds rights to 22 Pac-12 basketball games per-season, and splits coverage of the Pac-12 men's basketball tournament with ESPN and Pac-12 Network.

In 2014, the main Fox broadcast network first aired the early-season Las Vegas Invitational and Las Vegas Classic events. The following year, Fox Sports bought both events outright.

In 2017, Fox added coverage of selected Big Ten Conference games as part of a larger six-year contract, alongside ESPN and CBS, which had also given it rights to the conference's top football package. Fox Sports continues to operate Big Ten Network, which has carried Big Ten games since its launch in 2007.

Beginning in the 2020–21 season, Fox holds a share of the Mountain West Conference's basketball and football packages, split with CBS. To open the 2021–22 season, Fox aired six simultaneous Big East games on November 9, 2021, with all games streaming online, and "whiparound" coverage airing on FS1. The network planned an unconventional broadcast for a November 23 game featuring Mark Titus and Tate Frazier (of the Fox Sports-distributed podcast Titus & Tate) commentating the game in the style of a podcast.

On August 18, 2022, Fox renewed its rights to the Big Ten under a seven-year deal beginning in 2023–24, maintaining 45 men's basketball games per-season on Fox and FS1, as well as selected women's games. In October 2022, Fox also renewed its rights to the Big 12 Conference, adding rights to a package of basketball games for Fox and FS1.

For the 2022–23 season, Fox added a package of Saturday primetime games branded as Fox Primetime Hoops, and announced that six women's basketball games would air on the network—including the first Big Ten women's basketball games to air on Fox.

In April 2024, Fox Sports announced a partnership with AEG to begin hosting a new postseason tournament—the College Basketball Crown—in Las Vegas beginning in 2025. This 16-team tournament will primarily feature teams from the Big East, Big Ten, and Big 12 conferences who did not qualify for the NCAA tournament.

For the 2024–25 season, as part of a strategy to dedicate Friday nights to Fox Sports programming following the move of WWE SmackDown to USA Network, Fox added regular Friday primetime games.

== Theme music ==
On December 7, 2018, it was announced that Fox would use John Tesh's "Roundball Rock"—the theme music of the then-former NBA on NBC—as its theme music for college basketball games beginning during the 2018–19 season.

In 2025, NBC began a new media rights contract with the NBA and reinstated "Roundball Rock" as its theme music; John Ourand reported that since Fox currently had an exclusive license to "Roundball Rock", NBC had to sublicense its use of the theme from the network. Fox's rights to the theme expired after the 2025–26 season, and it was replaced by a sound-alike during Fox's first telecast of the 2026–27 season.

== Personalities ==
=== Play–by–play ===
- Gus Johnson (lead play-by-play)
- Tim Brando
- Connor Onion
- Kevin Kugler
- Adam Amin
- Dave Sims
- Sloane Martin
- Lisa Byington
- Jeff Levering
- Chris Myers

=== Color commentators ===
- Jim Jackson (lead analyst for Fox games)
- Bill Raftery (lead analyst for FS1 games)
- Nick Bahe
- Stephen Bardo
- Donny Marshall
- Jim Spanarkel
- Casey Jacobsen

=== Sideline reporters (select games) ===
- Kristina Pink
- Allison Williams

== See also ==
- Fox College Football
- Fox Sports College Hoops '99
