= Coin Drop! =

2011 video game

- Developer: Full Fat
- Platform: iOS
- Release: April 19, 2011
- Genre: Puzzle game
- Mode: Single-player

Coin Drop! is an iOS game developed by Full Fat and released on April 19, 2011.

== Critical reception ==
The game received almost universal critical acclaim, garnering a Metacritic rating of 89%, based on 14 critic reviews.

TouchArcade wrote "It's easy to pick up, easy to put down, easy to resume, and a blast to play wherever. But more important than its breeziness, Coin Drop rocks." AppGamer said "Coin Drop is our new favourite action puzzle game and I can see this game taking pride of place on my iPad for a long time to come. It has just the right level of giddy day-glo presentation, coupled with a great physics engine and addictive gameplay." AppSmile wrote " Featuring Peggle-like gameplay mixed with a variety of alternate collection bonuses, Coin Drop creates a compelling case for a swift ascent up the app store charts." AppSpy wrote "Comparisons aside, Coin Drop! is a fun game to play and watch while remaining addictive enough to keep you coming back for more; just the right mix for gamers on the go."

SlideToPlay said "Coin Drop is a gorgeous game that's a perfect fit on the iPhone." The Av Club wrote "While the game resembles Peggle in that it's also clearly inspired by pachinko, levels of Coin Drop! are more complex than anything in PopCap's game." MEGamers said "Coin Drop may take inspiration from Peggle but it's far off from a cut-paste job. At $0.99, Full Fat's platformer is a fun little game that will bring smile on anyone's face, and should not be missed." Gamezebo wrote "Coin Drop may seem pretty simple at first, but it's a blast and will keep most players entertained for quite some time." TouchGen said "Coin Drop! is one of those casual games that you got to have on your iOS device. Alongside Peggle, Tiny Wings and Cut the Rope it is both a perfect five minute game, and a great four hour marathon game."

Destructoid wrote "The mix of the art style, the level of polish throughout the game, and the highly addictive gameplay turn Coin Drop into a must-have for players of all ages. It takes some elements from Peggle and adds a ton of new elements into the mix, turning it into a casual orgy of color and sweet highscore lust." Multiplayer.it wrote "Coin Drop delivers lot of fun, creating a unique blend of ability and luck, mixed in a game that looks a bit like Peggle. But who cares? With such brilliant gameplay and a great presentation, Coin Drop really stands out in the App Store as a great arcade game for everyone." Pocket Gamer wrote " Putting a new spin on a combination of Pachinko and Peggle, Full Fat's Coin Drop is a bright, breezy, and enjoyable arcade game mixing elements of luck and skill."

148Apps said "The gameplay is perfectly suited for those ADD moments in life when you want to play a game or entertain yourself for a few minutes while you're waiting to do something else. This is a fun, easy to play game that nearly anyone can enjoy." Eurogamer wrote " Yes, just to add an even greater degree of random nonsense, you can shake the device to jog the coin a little, and therefore give you a chance to influence its direction. Once you start employing this tactic, of course, you can't bloody well stop, and so spend most of the game spasming like a drunk with an involuntary tic."
