= Agent Dash =

2012 video game

- App icon
- Developer: Full Fat
- Publisher: Full Fat
- Platforms: iOS, Android
- Release: August 2, 2012
- Genre: Platform
- Mode: Single-player

Agent Dash is a 2012 endless runner mobile game developed and published by Full Fat for iOS and Android.

== Reception ==
Reception

Aggregate score
Aggregator	Score
Metacritic	76/100

Review scores
Publication	Score
GamesMaster	76%
Gamezebo	4/5
Pocket Gamer	4/5
Digital Spy	3/5
Forbes	7/10

The iOS version received "generally favorable reviews" according to the review aggregation website Metacritic.
