= Freestyle Motocross: McGrath vs Pastrana =

2000 video game

- Developer: Z-Axis, Ltd.
- Publisher: Acclaim Entertainment (Note: Released under the Acclaim Sports label)
- Platform: PlayStation
- Release: NA: November 2, 2000; EU: December 8, 2000
- Genre: Racing
- Modes: Single-player, multiplayer

Freestyle Motocross: McGrath vs Pastrana is a racing video game developed by Z-Axis, Ltd. and published by Acclaim Entertainment for PlayStation in 2000.

== Reception ==
Reception

Aggregate score
Aggregator	Score
Metacritic	48/100

Review scores
Publication	Score
AllGame	2.5/5
CNET Gamecenter	4/10
Consoles +	40%
Electronic Gaming Monthly	4/10
EP Daily	8/10
Game Informer	3/10
GameSpot	3.7/10
IGN	3/10
Jeuxvideo.com	10/20
Official U.S. PlayStation Magazine	2.5/5

The game received "generally unfavorable reviews" according to the review aggregation website Metacritic.
