= Emergency Call Ambulance =

1999 video game

- Platform: Arcade
- Release: NA: 1999
- Genre: Driving
- Mode: Single player
- Arcade system: Sega Model 3

Emergency Call Ambulance (Japanese: 救急車, Hepburn: Kyūkyūsha; "Ambulance") is a 1999 arcade game released by Sega. It is a single-player driving game, controlled via a steering wheel, gearshift, and accelerator and brake pedals. The UK version of the Official Dreamcast Magazine reported that the game was to be released in a 3-in-1 compilation along with other games in Sega's "Real Life Career Series", Brave Firefighters and Jambo! Safari, but Emergency Call Ambulance remained an arcade exclusive until its inclusion in Yakuza Kiwami 3 & Dark Ties, released on 12 February 2026.

== Gameplay ==
In the game, the player takes the role of a Chicago Fire Department paramedic and ambulance driver, trying to save several people and taking them to the nearby hospital. Players can choose between using automatic transmission and manual transmission.

The game consists of several missions set in Chicago. The first victim is a ten-year-old child named Jack. His family's station wagon was in a collision with a tanker truck. The second victim is a 35-year-old Chicago Police officer named Edward, who has been shot by a gang (who somewhat resemble Yakuza), with a rocket launcher. The third victim is a 23-year-old woman named Kate. The hotel she and her partner were staying at has caught fire, and she is pregnant, and she gave birth to 3 babies. The final mission is to rescue Gregorio Tavaresky, the 48-year-old President of an unspecified country, whose airliner has crashed into Lake Michigan after being struck by lightning.

== Reception ==
In Japan, Game Machine listed Emergency Call Ambulance on their February 1, 2000 issue as being the ninth most-successful dedicated arcade game of the month. Jon Thompson of AllGame rated Emergency Call Ambulance three stars out of five and praised its graphics and sound effects, but criticized its difficulty and wrote: "Each of the levels is extremely scripted, and the sudden events and traffic patterns stay the same. Unlike Crazy Taxi, you're constricted to a single track that never changes."
