= Punch King =

2002 video game

- Developer: Full Fat
- Publisher: Acclaim Entertainment
- Platform: Game Boy Advance
- Release: NA: May 30, 2002; EU: July 26, 2002
- Genre: Sports video game
- Mode: Single-player

Punch King is a boxing video game developed by Full Fat and published by Acclaim Entertainment for Game Boy Advance in 2002.

== Reception ==
Reception

Aggregate score
Aggregator	Score
Metacritic	58/100

Review scores
Publication	Score
AllGame	2/5
Consoles +	83%
Game Informer	3/10
GameSpot	6.5/10
GameSpy	3/5
GameZone	8.1/10
IGN	6/10
Jeuxvideo.com	12/20
Nintendo Power	2.5/5
Nintendo World Report	3/10

The game received "mixed" reviews according to the review aggregation website Metacritic.
