= Justice League: Chronicles =

2003 video game

- Cover art by Bruce Timm and Alex Ross
- Developer: Full Fat
- Publisher: Midway Home Entertainment
- Director: Paul Adams
- Producers: Nathan Rose; Jason Ades; Ames Kirshen
- Designers: Paul Adams; Peter Ranson
- Programmers: Florian Raoult; Crispian Daniels
- Artists: Jamie Byrne; Jamie Bamborough; Tony Chen
- Writers: Eric DeSantis; Chad Lowe
- Composer: James Barnard
- Platform: Game Boy Advance
- Release: NA: November 10, 2003
- Genre: Beat 'em up
- Modes: Single player, multiplayer

Justice League: Chronicles is a 2003 beat 'em up video game developed by Full Fat and published by Midway Games for the Game Boy Advance. The game, based on the Justice League animated television series, features three episodic storylines, each showcasing a pair of the League's members in an overhead beat 'em up format and including a challenge with a 3D Mode 7 presentation.

The game was announced as a sequel to Midway's previous Justice League game Injustice for All under the working title Justice League: Dark Reflections. Upon release, it was received unfavorably by critics, who faulted its unresponsive controls, repetitive combat, and lackluster presentation.

== Gameplay ==
The three episodes in Justice League: Chronicles are primarily played from an overhead perspective (top), with each episode including a challenge with a 3D presentation (bottom).

Justice League: Chronicles is a beat 'em up video game with an overhead view. Players control Justice League members in three episodic storylines ("Dark Winter", "Trial in Ape City" and "Savage Time"), each featuring a specific pair of heroes. Players can switch between heroes in real-time, and each hero has two unique special abilities, such as the Green Lantern's shield or the Flash's spinning attack. Each episode features a challenge with a 3D Mode 7 presentation and concludes with a boss battle. Players can interact with barrels and boxes, which can be picked up and used as weapons. The game supports cooperative multiplayer via a Game Link Cable, allowing two players to control the paired heroes. A Watch Tower Combat Simulator mode allows players to create custom hero pairings outside the story mode.

== Plot ==
In "Dark Winter", the Martian Manhunter is suddenly caught off guard by a powerful psychic presence while surveying Antarctica. The Green Lantern and the Flash arrive to investigate a science facility in the area and discover that Killer Frost has taken control of it. The facility's scientists mutter about a black diamond named the Heart of Darkness, which will supposedly unleash Eclipso upon an imminent solar eclipse. Green Lantern and Flash defeat Killer Frost and rush to the Heart of Darkness's location, where they face the emerged Eclipso, who credits his escape to Killer Frost's wicked heart. Upon Eclipso's defeat, he is cast back into the Heart of Darkness, though Green Lantern surmises that as long as darkness exists in the hearts of men, he will always be a threat.

In "Trial in Ape City", the Justice League members are arrested at a United Nations meeting by the authorities of Ape City, who charge them with kidnapping their leaders and stealing their technology. Batman, deducing that the League is being framed, suggests allowing themselves to be extradited to ease investigation. Batman and Hawkgirl escape their cell to begin gathering evidence; the other members stay imprisoned to avoid cementing their perceived guilt, and they suspect Gorilla Grodd's involvement. The pair encounter discolored doppelgangers of Superman and Wonder Woman, which they later determine is a single shapeshifting creature. Atop the city's royal tower, Batman and Hawkgirl confront Grodd and the shapeshifter, Amazo, an android stolen from Professor Ivo. Grodd boasts of his plot to stage a political coup of Ape City before Batman and Hawkgirl defeat him and Amazo. The kidnapped leaders are released and Grodd's plan is revealed to the populace, proving the League's innocence.

In "Savage Time", Superman, Wonder Woman and Martian Manhunter enter a temporal anomaly to correct an error in history; Vandal Savage has brought advanced technology to the Axis powers during World War II, putting the Allies at a disadvantage. Superman and Wonder Woman assist at the front lines while Martian Manhunter seeks out the origin of the anachronistic war machines, eventually uncovering Vandal Savage's involvement. The three infiltrate Vandal Savage's headquarters before he can launch a final assault on the Allies and foil his plot to rule the world as the war's victor, preserving Earth's timeline.

== Development and release ==
Justice League: Chronicles was published by Midway Games and developed by Full Fat under the direction of Paul Adams, with Midway's Nathan Rose, Warner Bros.' Jason Ades and DC Comics's Ames Kirshen acting as producers. The game was programmed by Florian Raoult and Crispian Daniels. Adams and Peter Ranson were the game's concept designers, with Jamie Byrne and Jamie Bamborough designing the levels. The artwork was created by Byrne, Bamborough and Tony Chen, with Andrew Nixon working on the cutscenes. James Barnard created the game's audio. The stories and scripts were written by Eric DeSantis and Chad Lowe.

On May 9, 2003, Midway Games announced at E3 that it would release a sequel to its 2002 title Justice League: Injustice for All, titled Justice League: Dark Reflections, and displayed the game at the company's booth the following week. It was shipped to North American retailers under its final title on November 10, 2003.

== Reception ==
Reception

Aggregate score
Aggregator	Score
Metacritic	43/100

Review scores
Publication	Score
Game Informer	3/10
GamePro	8/20
GameSpy	2/5
GameZone	6.5/10
IGN	4/10
Nintendo Power	14.5/25

Justice League: Chronicles received "generally unfavorable" reviews according to review aggregator Metacritic. Pong Sifu of GamePro and Craig Harris of IGN derided the game as sloppy and rushed. Jeremy Zoss of Game Informer and Raymond Padilla of GameSpy were particularly dismayed at the wasted potential of a Justice League video game. Padilla and GameZone's Tha Wiz suggested that fans of the property might tolerate it, though Harris warned that even fans would be disappointed.

Critics panned the controls as unresponsive, laggy, and imprecise. Zoss described them as "floaty". while Padilla noted frequent input lag and poor collision detection, leading to frustrating button-mashing. Harris highlighted "horrible imprecision" and issues with character-swapping mechanics, and Pong Sifu called the controls "abominable".

The combat was widely criticized as monotonous and overly reliant on button-mashing. Padilla described it as a "poorly-executed mess" with limited move sets, and Pong Sifu noted "pathetically limited" moves and weak superpowers. Harris criticized the lack of a combo system and "loosey-goosey" collision detection, while Tha Wiz called it a simplistic "arcade-style beat-em-up" with repetitive boss patterns. Nintendo Power noted the characters’ actions were limited to basic running, jumping, and punching, despite their potential for more. Zoss and The Wiz criticized the AI, particularly for the non-controlled partner hero; Zoss called the helper character "useless as a second appendix", and Tha Wiz noted that the AI partner often stands idly by, undermining the teamwork concept.

The presentation was deemed lackluster. Padilla described the graphics as "mediocre", with dull environments and poorly animated characters. Harris criticized the "stiff and lifeless" animations and bland backgrounds, though he and Padilla noted the 3D Mode 7 sequences as a minor highlight. Tha Wiz praised the hero designs but found the backgrounds boring and repetitive. Zoss described the characters as bland and was baffled by Superman's resemblance to Jay Leno. Nintendo Power, on a minor positive note, called the characters "big and bold". Tha Wiz described the music as "canned" and lacking impact, with no voice-overs and generic comic-style sound effects. Harris found the music oddly haunting and mismatched with the superhero theme.

Critics acknowledged some variety in level design, with horizontal scrolling, vertical scrolling, and pseudo-3D flying sequences, but found it undermined by poor execution. Padilla noted the variety but wished for more refinement, while Harris found the platforming elements frustrating due to poor controls. Tha Wiz appreciated mission switches, like third-person viewpoints, but found the level layouts uninspired.

Game Informer ranked the game at #10 on their list of "Top 10 Worst Games of 2003", writing that "Not since the Wonder Twins has something brought so much shame to DC's mightiest heroes".
