= Battle Poker =

2009 video game

- Developer: Left Field Productions
- Publisher: Left Field Productions
- Platforms: Wii (WiiWare), PlayStation Portable
- Release: NA: July 20, 2009; (Wii): NA: December 10, 2009; (PSP)
- Genre: Puzzle
- Modes: Single-player, multiplayer

Battle Poker is a poker video game developed and published by Left Field Productions for the Wii's WiiWare service. It was released in North America on July 20, 2009. It was released on the PlayStation Portable on December 10, 2009.

== Gameplay ==
The game sees players racing against a time limit to make the best five-card hand possible. The game's "battles" consist of many rounds with points scored at the end of each round based on the cards in each player's hand.

The player uses the Wii Remote to point and click on a grid of upturned playing cards to turn a card over for all players to see. Players then have an opportunity to take the card to add it to their hand. Points are also scored for each round based on the quality of the player's hand.

=== Game modes ===
There are two types of play in Battle Poker, Single Player and Multiplayer. Players can also change options such as time limits, grid size, power-ups, and background graphics.

==== Single Player ====
Single Player modes include:

- Shuffle Up 'n Deal - Players have to make the best 5-card poker hand in each row and each column of a 5x5 grid by switching/shuffling cards around.
- Chain Reaction - Players have to make as many 5-card poker hand chains within a set time limit. Users play against the CPU in a set of rounds with the overall high score winning.

==== Multiplayer ====
Multiplayer modes allow 2-4 players to compete in the following battles:

- Classic - Players make the best 5-card poker hand by searching and grabbing cards from a face-down array of cards. Players have to be quick here because other players can steal cards from them or use a set of power-ups to remove cards from their hand. Players play a set of rounds with the overall high score winning.
- Wait Your Turn - Like "Classic", in "Wait Your Turn" players make the best 5-card poker hand by searching and grabbing cards from a face-down array of cards, but this time, they take turns choosing cards with a time limit for each round for players to make their choices. Players play a set of rounds with the overall high score winning.
- Mad Dash - Players make the best 5-card poker hand by searching and grabbing cards from a face-up, but limited array of cards in only 15 seconds. Players play a set of rounds with the overall high score winning.

== Reception ==
Reception

Review scores
Publication	Score
IGN	5.6/10
Nintendo Life	5/10

Battle Poker received mixed reviews upon its release. Daemon Hatfield of IGN gave the Wii version of the game a 5.6/10, saying that the controls "work well" but otherwise criticizing it for its lack of online play and its "shallow" mini-games. Philip J. Reed of Nintendo Life gave the game five out of ten stars, praising the presentation and interface but also criticizing its lack of appeal to general audiences.
