= Thrasher Presents Skate and Destroy =

1999 video game

- Developer: Z-Axis
- Publisher: Rockstar Games
- Platform: PlayStation
- Release: NA: November 23, 1999; UK: January 28, 2000
- Genre: Sports
- Modes: Single-player, multiplayer

Thrasher Presents Skate and Destroy, also known as Thrasher: Skate and Destroy, is a skateboard video game developed by Z-Axis and published by Rockstar Games for the PlayStation. The game was later published in Japan by UEP Systems on March 4, 2000, under the name Thrasher SK8. A Game Boy Color version was also developed, but was later cancelled.

Despite having less recognition, it received high scores from both IGN and GameSpot, being seen as "technically superior to Tony Hawk" and an "almost sim-like approach to the sport". Aside from less advanced graphics, this was one of the reasons Thrasher was ignored, as the learning curve (due to unconventional controls) is fairly steep compared to the 'pick up and play' style of the Tony Hawk games. It is also one of the first games to have ragdoll physics.

The objective of the game is to take one of the six fictional skaters and work through a total of 12 levels across the globe, gaining sponsors, decks and clothing, and eventually appearing on the front of Thrasher magazine - from which the game takes its name.

== Gameplay ==
Reviewers noted the more realistic style and different control layout, compared to Tony Hawk, which added to the overall difficulty of the game. Because it is more of a simulation of skateboarding as a whole, the focus of the game is mostly on technical tricks and to perform tricks efficiently, a formula that the future skateboarding Skate series of video games would build on, whereas the Tony Hawk series, even from its outset, had a focus on arcade style gameplay and is rather more forgiving.

Like the other Z-Axis developed sports titles, the game features ragdoll physics. In keeping with the realistic nature of the game, players can break their skateboard and even bones if they crash hard enough (especially if the player does so into moving vehicles). Breaking their skateboard will mean the player has to restart their run and will lose their score, so it is in their best interest to use the 'bail' button combination (L2 + R2), as well as the 'tuck' button (Circle/O), while in the air to minimize the damage.

=== Skate Mode ===
This is the main gameplay mode, where the player advances through 12 different levels in a series of two-minute runs. When the player enters a level, there is no time limit so they are free to explore the whole area before starting their run with the Select button. The player then has two minutes to get the high score necessary to complete the level without breaking their board or getting caught by either a Police Officer, a Guard Dog, or a Street Mugger; this occurs when the time limit reaches ten seconds. The player is seen from behind, with said chasers arm or (in case of the dog) head in view ready to attack the skater, who then must leave the level through one of the designated exit doors. If the skater is caught, then their score is annulled and the run must be done again.

In the competition levels (last level of each zone), the player's objective is also to gain score, except this time they are being judged on "high difficulty, risk and style". Repeating the same tricks in the same areas devalues their point score, so the player must use a wide selection of different tricks and objects in the level, as well as avoiding bails (sometimes almost completely) to progress.

At certain points in the game, the player is also offered choices of sponsors. Three are available at once, but only one can be chosen, which then gives the player new decks, shirts, pants and shoes to outfit their skater with.

Once the player has completed the game on the Expert setting, they are classified as a 'Pro Skater'. However, to fully complete the game and to feature on the cover of Thrasher Magazine, the player must go back through the levels and once again complete them. At the end of the runs, the player is able to take a photo of any tricks performed in that run to feature on the cover. Completing all of this lets the player feature in the 'Skater of the Year' issue of the magazine, which marks the end of the game.

=== Multiplayer Mode ===
There are seven total multiplayer game types available for two players. In the same way as Dave Mirra Freestyle BMX, the players do not skate simultaneously, instead they take turns. The game types are identical to Dave Mirra, just renamed. Each game takes place on a different level associated with the specific challenge. The game types are follows:

- Sessions: Each player has a two-minute run to beat the other player's score.
- Nickel Bag: Players take turns doing single tricks. The highest scoring single trick wins.
- H.O.R.S.E.: One player does a trick, then the other must match it. If they do not, they are assigned one of the letters of 'HORSE'. The first player to get all the letters, spelling out the whole word, loses.
- Top Dog: Each player takes turns doing different tricks at five different spots. The highest total point score wins.
- Sick Fix: Taking advantage of the ragdoll physics, the players take turns inflicting the most damage to the player by crashing into different objects in the level. The highest score wins.
- Long Grind: Longest grind in the level wins.
- Big Wallride: The highest wallride in the level wins.

=== Characters ===
There are six fictional characters to choose from in Thrasher. Players can rename and re-clothe (when new clothes are unlocked) any skater if so desired. Each player has different statistics, meaning that some tricks will be performed more easily. Also, each character also has a special move that is executed with a specific combination.

== Soundtrack ==
The game is unique for its soundtrack as it only features early rap and hip-hop songs from the late 1980s to early 1990s as compared to other skate punk video game soundtracks in the genre.

== Reception ==
Reception

Aggregate score
Aggregator	Score
GameRankings	73%

Review scores
Publication	Score
AllGame	2/5
Edge	6/10
Electronic Gaming Monthly	6.75/10 (Note: Two critics of Electronic Gaming Monthly gave the game each a score of 7/10, and the other two gave it 6.5/10.)
Game Informer	8/10
GamePro	4/5
GameSpot	8.1/10
IGN	8.5/10
Jeuxvideo.com	17/20
Next Generation	2/5
Official U.S. PlayStation Magazine	3.5/5

The game received above-average reviews according to the review aggregation website GameRankings. Blake Fischer of NextGen called it "a sim that's tedious, not fun".
