= 3D Baseball =

1996 video game

- Developer: Crystal Dynamics
- Publishers: NA: Crystal Dynamics; JP: BMG Japan
- Designer: Sam Player
- Platforms: PlayStation, Sega Saturn
- Release: PlayStation: NA: December 9, 1996; JP: February 28, 1997; Saturn: NA: December 11, 1996; JP: January 31, 1997
- Genre: Sports
- Modes: Single player, multiplayer

3D Baseball is a sports game developed and published by Crystal Dynamics and distributed by Activision. It was released in December 1996 for PlayStation and Sega Saturn. It received mixed reviews from critics.

== Gameplay ==
There are over 700 major league players included with their own statistics and batting stances (50 of which are included). The season mode contains a full season of baseball, where the player can play each individual game, or just act as a general manager while the game's outcomes are automated. Playing as a general manager entails running the team, including activities such as picking line-ups and the pitching rotation, substituting batters and runners, and trading players, and building their own team. Players can play a short or extended season or opt to play a quickie arcade game against the computer or friend.

== Development ==
The player animations were created using a new animation process called Real Motion Control, which involved motion capture. Game designer Sam Player explained the concept behind this process: "The reason everything always ends up looking choppy in [most motion capture] games is that the machines can't store all the frames necessary for the full animation, and they end up showing every fifth frame or so. What we do is build polygonal models, break each model up into joints, and then follow the curve of each joint in motion. Then we save those curves instead of each individual frame of animation." The game features CNN sportscaster Van Earl Wright as the announcer.

== Reception ==
Reception

Review scores
Publication	Score
GameRevolution	B+
GameSpot	7.6/10 (PS); 7/10 (SS)
Next Generation	3/5 (SS)
The Electric Playground	6/10 (PS)

The game received mixed reviews from critics. Reviews for the Saturn version typically commented that the game's smooth polygonal models and motion capture methodology combined to make the most realistic-looking baseball players in a video game to date, but that the gameplay, though as good or better than most baseball games, falls short of the leading competitors of the time, World Series Baseball II and Triple Play 97. GamePro particularly mentioned some frustrations with the fielding controls.

Reviewing the PlayStation version, Hugh Sterbakov of GameSpot praised the realism and the voice of Van Earl Wright, but criticized the absences of Major League Baseball teams or logos, that players can only take the field in four "imaginary" ballparks, and that it lacks all-star, home run derby, and playoff modes. GamePro panned the game, remarking that "although the graphics rank among the best of any baseball game, the gameplay's among the worst." They elaborated that the camera's practice of zooming in on the fielder makes it hard to know what is going on, and the physics are highly inaccurate. Game Revolution praised the game's "outstanding" 3D graphics, real stances and swings, "excellent" sound effects and commentary, competitive gameplay, and real teams that can be updated through trades.
