= Harlem Globetrotters: World Tour =

2006 basketball sports video game

- Developer: Full Fat
- Publishers: NA: Destination Software; PAL: Zoo Digital Publishing
- Platforms: Game Boy Advance, Nintendo DS
- Release: Game Boy Advance: NA: October 2, 2006; Nintendo DS: NA: March 7, 2007
- Genre: Sports
- Mode: Single player

Harlem Globetrotters: World Tour is a basketball sports video game developed by Full Fat and published by Destination Software. It was released for the Game Boy Advance on October 2, 2006, and for the Nintendo DS on March 7, 2007.

World Tour features the Harlem Globetrotters playing against teams from around the world in games of 2-on-2 basketball in a style reminiscent of the NBA Jam series. World Tour garnered negative reviews from critics on release.

A version for the PlayStation Portable was also planned, but it was later cancelled.

== Gameplay ==
The player controls the Globetrotters on offense in the Game Boy Advance version.

Harlem Globetrotters: World Tour is a 2-on-2 basketball game where the player controls the Harlem Globetrotters as they face off against teams from around the world. Quarters last 1–3 minutes. The game has two modes: Quick Match and World Tour. The "Quick Match" mode allows the player to select a team and choose two players with no difference in gameplay between them. In "World Tour" mode, the player controls the Harlem Globetrotters as they play against 50 fictional teams from across the world. The Game Boy Advance version of the game requires password inputs to keep track of progress instead of using saved games.

During the game, the player can switch manually between controlling one of their two players, or can pass the basketball to automatically switch. The players can sprint, but are limited in duration by a stamina bar. The R button on both the Nintendo DS and Game Boy Advance versions allows for "basket targeting" which allows the player to change which basket they're aiming at (although there is only one basket). The game does not have the Washington Generals at all, even though the team has been the traditional rivals of the Harlem Globetrotters for over 50 years.

== Reception ==
Reception

Aggregate score
Aggregator	Score
GameRankings	31.6% (GBA); 31.5% (DS)

Review scores
Publication	Score
GameSpot	2.8/10
GameZone	2.7/10
IGN	2.5/10
Nintendojo	4/10

Harlem Globetrotters: World Tour received negative reception from critics, who commented on the game's broken AI, lack of reverence to the Globetrotters' license, and overall terrible gameplay.

Many reviews commented on the game's dated gameplay. GameZone's Louis Bedigian commented that it could have been an exciting game if it had been released "15 to 20 years ago." GameSpot's Frank Provo specifically criticized the disregard of the Harlem Globetrotters legacy in the game and IGN's Chris Adams noted that fans of the Globetrotters will be "annoyed by the absence of everything memorable about the team"." Ninendojo's Brendan Kerr felt that the game should have been refocused on the Globetrotters' comedic elements instead of being wasted in a generic basketball game.

Criticism also found the overall presentation of the game disappointing, especially compared to the NBA Jam. Nintendojo's Kerr felt that World Tour copied the wrong parts of the NBA Jam franchise and that the game felt "essentially generic". GameZone's Bedigian noticed that players jumped in the air "like they were frogs" when shooting and felt that character models were "indiscernible". GameSpot's Provo felt that animations in the game were choppy or broken.

IGN's Adams noted that the Nintendo DS's use of saved games was an improvement over the Game Boy Advance version, but found little else changed between the two. Other criticism focused on the game's broken AI. Multiple reviewers noted that the game's artificial intelligence was broken, and that the game lacked Game Link Cable support and players were forced to compete against a mediocre and lackadaisical computer.
