= Mayhem (video game) =

2011 video game

- Developer: Left Field Productions
- Publisher: Rombax Games
- Platforms: PlayStation 3, Xbox 360
- Release: NA: March 25, 2011; EU: March 30, 2012 (PS3)
- Genre: Racing

Mayhem (also known as Mayhem 3D) is a racing video game developed by Left Field Productions, published by Rombax Games, and distributed by Zoo Entertainment for Xbox 360 and PlayStation 3. The game is a demolition derby style game that features 3D gameplay that works on any TV.

Mayhem would be the final game developed by Left Field Productions before the company went out of business.

== Graphics ==
The game features full 3D compatibility for any TV. It has an art style similar to MadWorld for the Wii, an oversaturated graphic novel style with the only colors being black, white, and red as the sky.

== Gameplay ==
The career mode is split into graphic novel chapters. There are multiple different game modes to play throughout the game. There are many things to unlock with Mayhem Points and Stars, including vehicles and tracks.

== Reception ==
Reception

Aggregate score
Aggregator	Score	
Aggregator	PS3	Xbox 360
Metacritic	53/100	47/100

Review scores
Publication	Score	
Publication	PS3	Xbox 360
GameRevolution	D	D
GameZone	N/A	5.5/10
Official Xbox Magazine (US)	N/A	5/10
PlayStation: The Official Magazine	4/10	N/A

The PlayStation 3 version received "mixed" reviews, while the Xbox 360 version received "generally unfavorable reviews", according to the review aggregation website Metacritic.
