= MTX Mototrax =

2004 video game

- Developers: Left Field Productions; Beenox (PC, Mac)
- Publishers: Activision; Aspyr (PC, Mac)
- Programmer: John Brandwood
- Artist: Ron Alpert
- Composer: Womb Music
- Platforms: PlayStation 2, Xbox, Windows, Mac OS X, PlayStation Portable
- Release: PlayStation 2, Xbox: NA: March 2, 2004; EU: March 26, 2004; Microsoft Windows, Mac OS X: NA: November 15, 2004; PlayStation Portable: NA: June 28, 2006; EU: February 9, 2007; AU: February 14, 2007
- Genre: Racing
- Modes: Single-player, multiplayer

MTX Mototrax is a racing video game developed by Left Field Productions and published by Activision for PlayStation 2 and Xbox in 2004. It was released for Microsoft Windows and Mac OS X later that year developed by Beenox and published by Aspyr. It was also released in 2006 for the PlayStation Portable. Additional releases were planned for the GameCube console in 2004, which was later canceled, and Tapwave Zodiac, which was called off when Tapwave went out of business. A demo version of the game is available in the options menu in the PlayStation 2 version of Tony Hawk's Underground.

The game was developed in partnership with motocross rider Travis Pastrana, who lent his name and image to the game via its box art. It was originally titled Travis Pastrana's Pro MotoX before being renamed MTX: Mototrax featuring Travis Pastrana and eventually settling on its final name.

MTX Mototrax features many of the top AMA Supercross/Motocross racers and X Games freestylers of that time (2004), including Nate Adams, Kenny Bartram, Carey Hart, Chad Reed, Tim Ferry, Mike Brown, Ezra Lusk, among others. The first level in career mode is held at Pastrana's house.

MTX Mototrax supports split-screen multiplayer for up to 2 players and online for up to 8 players. While online support for original Xbox games ended in April 2010, MTX Mototrax is now playable online with Insignia, a revival server restoring online functionality to original Xbox games.

== Reception ==
Reception

Aggregate score
Aggregator	Score			
Aggregator	PC	PS2	PSP	Xbox
Metacritic	75/100	77/100	67/100	79/100

Review scores
Publication	Score			
Publication	PC	PS2	PSP	Xbox
Electronic Gaming Monthly	N/A	6/10	N/A	6/10
Game Informer	N/A	7.5/10	N/A	7.5/10
GamePro	N/A	4/5	N/A	N/A
GameSpot	N/A	7.2/10	7.6/10	7.2/10
GameSpy	N/A	3/5	N/A	3/5
GameZone	8/10	9.1/10	N/A	7.9/10
IGN	8.3/10	8.6/10	7.2/10	8.7/10
Official U.S. PlayStation Magazine	N/A	2.5/5	5/10	N/A
Official Xbox Magazine (US)	N/A	N/A	N/A	8.2/10
PC Gamer (US)	75%	N/A	N/A	N/A

The game received "generally favorable reviews" on all platforms except the PSP version, which received "average" reviews, according to video game review aggregator Metacritic.
