= Jambo! Safari =

1999 video game

- Jambo! Safari Japanese sales flyer
- Developers: AM3; Full Fat (Wii and DS ports)
- Publisher: Sega
- Platforms: Arcade, Wii, Nintendo DS
- Release: Arcade; 1999; Wii, Nintendo DS: NA: November 17, 2009
- Modes: Single-player, multiplayer
- Arcade system: Sega NAOMI

Jambo! Safari is a video game first released by Sega in 1999. The original arcade version of the game used the Naomi board, arcade hardware which was based on Sega's Dreamcast video game console. Even though other Naomi-based arcade games were, Jambo! Safari was never released for the Dreamcast. The UK version of the Official Dreamcast Magazine reported that the game was to be released in a 3-in-1 compilation along with other games in Sega's "Real Life Career Series", Brave Firefighters and Emergency Call Ambulance, but such a game was never released and neither of the other two games were ported either. Sega released versions of the game for the Wii and Nintendo DS, under the title Jambo! Safari: Animal Rescue on November 17, 2009.

== Gameplay ==
In Jambo! Safari, players use a steering wheel and a gear shift to pursue animals in a jeep and catch them using a lasso. Players can select from four different player characters and several different vehicles to drive. The Wii version has the same gameplay as the arcade game, modified to accommodate the Wii's motion controls. In the Wii version, the Wii Remote is used for the lasso controls and the nunchuk is used to steer the vehicle. In addition to new controls and updated graphics, the Wii version also has new options such as customizable characters and vehicles. The Wii version's story mode centers roaming the in-game environment in search of missions to complete and gaining experience points to become a full-fledged park ranger. Players can also interact with captured animals, treat their injuries and feed them. The game also features other new modes such as co-operative missions, and four-player party games such as ostrich racing. In the Wii game, players can also choose a mode based on the original arcade game.

The DS version of the game focuses on educating young players about animals during gameplay. This handheld version of the game makes use of the DS stylus to perform actions such as diagnosing and treating animals.

== Reception ==
In Japan, Game Machine listed Jambo! Safari on their November 15, 1999 issue as being the thirteenth most-successful dedicated arcade game of the month.

== See also ==
- Afrika (video game)
