= Dave Mirra BMX Challenge =

2006 video game

- Developer: Left Field Productions
- Publishers: NA: Crave Entertainment; EU: Oxygen Interactive (PSP); EU: 505 Games (Wii)
- Programmer: David Anderson
- Composer: Richard Aronson
- Series: Dave Mirra Freestyle BMX
- Platforms: PlayStation Portable, Wii
- Release: PlayStation Portable: NA: November 2, 2006; EU: June 15, 2007; AU: August 9, 2007; Wii: NA: September 25, 2007; AU: October 18, 2007; EU: October 19, 2007
- Genre: Racing
- Mode: Single-player

Dave Mirra BMX Challenge is a racing video game by Crave Entertainment for the PlayStation Portable and later for the Nintendo Wii. It was the only entry in the Dave Mirra series released by Crave Entertainment after the previous publisher, Acclaim Entertainment, filed for bankruptcy in 2004, and the final entry in the series overall.

== Gameplay ==
PSP version

The PSP version consists of three modes: exhibition, quickplay, and a career mode. The career mode consists of race and trick events. Career mode has different levels of difficulty as well, which adds more challenge to the game. The Wii version likewise has many of the same modes, including career mode and bases most of the game around it. It also utilizes the Wii Remote's motion controls for steering and jumping; tricks are otherwise executed with button combinations.

== Development and release ==
Dave Mirra Freestyle BMX publisher Acclaim Entertainment, after settling a lawsuit with freestyle BMX rider Dave Mirra, announced on October 23, 2003 that their licensing agreement would continue until 2011. However, the following year Acclaim went bankrupt and liquidated before another Dave Mirra Freestyle BMX title could be released. In 2005, the series as well as ATV: Quad Power Racing were sold to Crave Entertainment for $120,000. On April 13, 2006, publisher Crave Entertainment announced Dave Mirra BMX Challenge, which was planned to be released for the PlayStation Portable in October.

On March 13, 2007, Crave Entertainment announced a Wii port of the game that would be released in June. The Wii version of Dave Mirra BMX Challenge was showcased at E3 2007, and the game was given an initial release date of August 21, before it was delayed to September 25.

== Reception ==
Reception

Aggregate score
Aggregator	Score	
Aggregator	PSP	Wii
Metacritic	32/100	36/100

Review scores
Publication	Score	
Publication	PSP	Wii
1Up.com	D−	N/A
4Players	62%	N/A
GameSpot	3.9/10	3.5/10
GameZone	7.3/10	N/A
IGN	2/10	2/10
Jeuxvideo.com	9/20	6/20
NGamer	N/A	40%
Nintendo Power	N/A	4/10
PlayStation Official Magazine – UK	3/10	N/A
Pocket Gamer	1/5	N/A
PSM3	35%	N/A

The game received "generally unfavorable reviews" on both platforms according to video game review aggregator Metacritic.
