= Van Earl Wright =

American sportscaster (born 1962)

- Born: January 27, 1962 (age 64); Atlanta, Georgia, U.S.
- Occupation: Television sports broadcaster / broadcaster / news anchor
- Years active: 1985-present
- Employer: Turner Sports
- Known for: work as sports anchor on CNN's Sports Tonight & anchor for CNN Headline News
- Children: 3

Van Earl Wright (born January 27, 1962) is an American television sportscaster, news anchor and journalist with over 30 years of national and local experience.

A graduate of the University of South Carolina, Wright is known for a homespun delivery which reflects his Southern roots. His signature greeting is "Hel-looooo, everybody."

== Broadcasting career ==
=== Fox Sports Net (FSN) ===
For much of the late 1990s until the summer of 2007, Wright worked for Fox Sports Net, serving chiefly as an anchor of both the National Sports Report and FSN Final Score, both attempts at competing with ESPN's SportsCenter. He also hosted and anchored for Fox Sports West, including their regional NSR companion, the Southern California Sports Report. During his stint at FSN, he was most notable for his staunch support and adulation of Kobe Bryant of the L.A. Lakers.

=== CNN ===
Wright is a former anchor at both CNN Headline News and CNN/Sports Illustrated, which put together reflects the longest tenure of his career. He also co-hosted Fox Sports Radio's Morning Extravaganza.

Even though he was never shown on-air, Wright's voice became legendary during Headline News' sports segments during the 1980s at 19 and 49 minutes after the hour, especially for his elongated pronunciation of 'Los An-ge-leees'. Late in his tenure, he also routinely read his dry mandated sign-off ("I'm Van Earl Wright, CNN Headline Sports") with a series of increasingly bizarre inflections. His segment got noted on-air by Larry King and Al Michaels, among others.

=== Other broadcasting assignments ===
Wright also worked in Beaumont, Texas as a weekend sports anchor on KBMT and later in Detroit both as a sports anchor on WDIV, the local NBC television affiliate, and also as the host of a short-lived midday show on all-sports radio station WDFN-AM. Reflecting on his move from WDIV to CNN, he said, "My four years at CNN were great in that I received a lot of exposure not only nationally, but worldwide as well. It definitely helped me develop a style that I am now well known for, but it was also very limiting because the atmosphere there was very conservative. In the end, I realized that if I wanted the opportunity to grow and take on new challenges in broadcasting ... it was going to be somewhere else."

Wright provided the announcer's voice for Crystal Dynamics' Sega Saturn baseball video game 3D Baseball and 3DO basketball game Slam 'n Jam 95.

=== World Championship Wrestling (WCW) and other appearances ===
Wright also provided the voice overs for World Championship Wrestling in the 90's during segments promoting upcoming live events.

On February 22, 2007 Wright participated on a special broadcasters' edition of Pros vs. Joes on Spike TV with Derrin Horton and Sal Masakela. The "pros" they faced were former NBA center Rik Smits, tennis pro Robby Ginepri, former MLB relief pitcher Rob Dibble and former NFL wide receiver Andre Rison.

Wright has had a few appearances on Ned's Declassified School Survival Guide playing himself alongside Willie Gault as sports broadcasters and most recently was featured in the series finale.

In January 2008, Wright became the voice of the new American Gladiators on NBC, which was hosted by Hulk Hogan and Laila Ali.

From 2012 until mid-2013, Wright provided the play by play commentary for the Lingerie Football League, until being replaced by league associates Jim Stews and Mitchell Mortaza.
