= The Little Mermaid II: Pinball Frenzy =

2000 video game

- North American cover art
- Developer: Left Field Productions
- Publisher: Nintendo
- Designer: Robert Hemphill
- Programmer: David Ashley
- Artist: Roger Hardy Jr.
- Composer: Mark Chosak
- Series: The Little Mermaid
- Platform: Game Boy Color
- Release: NA: September 24, 2000; PAL: March 16, 2001
- Genre: Pinball
- Modes: Single-player, multiplayer

The Little Mermaid II: Pinball Frenzy is a 2000 pinball video game developed by Left Field Productions and published by Nintendo for the Game Boy Color. First released in North America on September 24, 2000, it was later made available in PAL regions on March 16, 2001.

The Little Mermaid II: Pinball Frenzy is based on the 1989 film The Little Mermaid and its 2000 sequel The Little Mermaid II: Return to the Sea. In it, the player interacts with two pinball tables based on the mermaid Ariel and her daughter Melody. It features 16 minigames, which were identified as a primary part of the game. The Little Mermaid II: Pinball Frenzy supports up to four players through alternating tables.

Disney Interactive developed The Little Mermaid II: Pinball Frenzy alongside Left Field Productions as part of its focus on children's entertainment software. Although the game received positive reviews, critics were divided over the decision to develop a pinball game based on The Little Mermaid franchise. Reviewers negatively compared it to the 1999 game Pokémon Pinball.

== Gameplay ==
Minigames, including one based on the musical sequence for "Kiss the Girl", are a primary component of The Little Mermaid II: Pinball Frenzy.

The Little Mermaid II: Pinball Frenzy is a 2D pinball video game based on the 1989 film The Little Mermaid and its 2000 sequel The Little Mermaid II: Return to the Sea. It has two pinball tables, which each are connected to one of the film's protagonists: the mermaid Ariel and her daughter Melody respectively. The tables have references to the films, including images of Ariel's grotto and Ursula's cave and guest appearances from Flounder, Sebastian, and Dash among other characters. The menus, tables, and minigames feature unique background scores, which are reminiscent of those used in both films.

The Little Mermaid II: Pinball Frenzy does not have a prominent storyline, and instead focuses entirely on its gameplay mechanics. It is built on a different game engine from those used for the previous Nintendo pinball titles: Pokémon Pinball (1999) and Kirby's Pinball Land (1993). The tables include "flippers, multipliers, bonus targets, and multiballs", which IGN described as standard gameplay elements for pinball video games. Objectives include: performing timed skill shots, earning bonus points, and playing with three balls at once.

The player can unlock 16 minigames by earning points and completing activities. According to GameSpot, these games form the "underlying premise" of The Little Mermaid II: Pinball Frenzy. They are divided equally between the tables for Ariel and Melody. Each minigame is each based on scenes from the films. In one instance, the player hits frogs and fish from the "Kiss the Girl" sequence, and in another, they help Melody escape from a frozen block of ice in another. Two other minigames involve the player rescuing King Triton and other mermaids and helping people escape from a burning ship. A player is only given one life for each attempt to complete a minigame. If the player successfully finishes a minigame, it becomes accessible for replay through the main menu.

The player can adjust the game's difficulty by selecting three of five balls per game, and set the ball speed to either slow or fast: "Turtle" or "Rabbit". According to CNET, the game has a medium difficulty and a learning curve of roughly half an hour. It has a rumble feature, which vibrates the Game Boy Color when turned on with an extra battery. The game supports up to four players through alternating tables, and has cheat codes for infinite balls and a maximum score.

== Development and release ==
The Little Mermaid II: Pinball Frenzy was developed by Left Field Productions and published by Nintendo. Disney Interactive functioned as the "license holder for externally-developed products", and primarily collaborated with other businesses for the creation and marketing of "children's entertainment and learning software". According to the Green Bay Press-Gazette, Disney developed The Little Mermaid II: Pinball Frenzy and Alice in Wonderland (2000) in response to a study which found women constituted 43 percent of video gamers.

The Little Mermaid II: Pinball Frenzy was an exclusive release for the Game Boy Color. Also known as Disney's The Little Mermaid II: Pinball Frenzy, it was made available on September 24, 2000 in the U.S. and March 16, 2001, in PAL regions. AllGame reported the release of The Little Mermaid II: Pinball Frenzy reflected how pinball had become a widely accepted activity on the same level as baseball and checkers. It was released the same year as a PlayStation game also based on The Little Mermaid II: Return to the Sea. An instruction manual including a list of the mini-games and table games and a glossary of pinball-related terms was packaged with the game. It supported multiple languages, including German, and was compatible with the Game Boy Printer.

== Critical reception ==
Reception

Aggregate score
Aggregator	Score
GameRankings	74%

Review scores
Publication	Score
AllGame	3.5/5
Game Informer	7.5/10
GameSpot	7/10
IGN	7/10

Critical response to The Little Mermaid II: Pinball Frenzy was mixed. It holds an average score of 74% at the review aggregator website GameRankings based on six reviews.

The game received positive reviews. GameSpot predicted it would be popular with a younger audience, and praised the table's vibrant colors and the recreation of the films' soundtracks. AllGame thought the game's multiplayer tournaments and adjustable difficulties would encourage families to play together. The Pittsburgh Post-Gazette described The Little Mermaid II: Pinball Frenzy as "surprisingly detailed and entertaining". IGN said it was ideal for female gamers and a "nice diversion" for pinball fans; however, the website was critical of the physics of the pinballs, which it described as "a little on the floaty side" and "not as quick as the previous pinball incarnations".

The decision to base a video game on The Little Mermaid II: Return to the Sea divided critics. GamesRadar+ considered it an example of "sheer exploitation", describing it as "a game no one asked for, based on a sequel fans hated, representing a genre its intended demographic was too young to remember". Game Informer considered it unsuitable for a younger male audience due to a concern that "owning this title will brand them a pansy for the rest of their elementary school careers". The magazine also said the game was a "worthwhile pastime" for those "comfortable enough in [their] own sexuality to own a girl game". In a more positive review, Gamereactor praised the decision to adapt a Disney property into a pinball game rather than a more predictable platform game. Gamekult enjoyed the game although the site considered pinball and The Little Mermaid to be an odd combination. The magazine CSR wrote: "This pinball game is a pleasant surprise in the new Little Mermaid II line-up".

Critics negatively compared The Little Mermaid II: Pinball Frenzy to Pokémon Pinball. IGN felt the game was inferior to Nintendo's previous releases: Pokémon Pinball and Kirby's Pinball Land. Despite criticizing the game for having less variety than Pokémon Pinball, GameSpot said it was "just as satisfying in its own particular way". The site was disappointed by the absence of Pikachu and other Pokémon due to the game's release during the "era of Pokémania". AllGame considered The Little Mermaid II: Pinball Frenzy's cute visuals derivative when compared to other pinball games. The website felt the game would appeal primarily to young girls while experienced pinball players would prefer Pokémon Pinball.
