= Fox Sports College Hoops '99 =

1998 video game

- Cover art
- Developer: Z-Axis
- Publisher: Fox Sports Interactive
- Platform: Nintendo 64
- Release: NA: November 23, 1998
- Genre: Sports
- Modes: Single player, multiplayer

Fox Sports College Hoops '99 is a college basketball sports video game developed by Z-Axis, published by Fox Interactive under the brand name Fox Sports Interactive, and distributed by 20th Century Fox Home Entertainment for the Nintendo 64. Jeff Sheppard of the University of Kentucky is featured on the cover.

Developed to be an NBA-branded video game, it had to be rebranded as a college basketball game after the original publisher shut down. The game features 120 college basketball teams, multiplayer support for two players, and many of the college championships including the NCAA men's basketball championship. It was the first college sports game for the Nintendo 64.

== Gameplay ==
A player from the University of Kentucky shoots a jump shot.

The game allows the player to play a single game between any two teams in an exhibition mode, or to play a season mode as the manager of a college basketball team. College Hoops '99 only supports up to two player multiplayer, unlike comparable games of the time which supported four player multiplayer. The season mode contains most of the major college tournaments including early-season tournaments, although the National Invitation Tournament was not included.

The game uses Fox Sports's TV set-up in order to give the player a more realistic feel to gameplay. However, there is little commentary and there are no real fight songs or other university-specific songs in the game.

== Development ==
With development near complete by mid-1997, the game ultimately released as Fox Sports College Hoops '99 was to be the first NBA game for the Nintendo 64 and feature an expensive Michael Jordan license. However, original publisher BMG Interactive ceased operations, costing the game the non-transferable NBA and Jordan licenses. After developer Z-Axis shopped the game around to publishers for several months, it was picked up by Fox Interactive, who gave it an NCAA license. Once the game was picked up, Z-Axis increased the memory size and optimization to run in high resolution.

== Reception ==
Reception

Aggregate score
Aggregator	Score
GameRankings	54%

Review scores
Publication	Score
AllGame	2.5/5
Electronic Gaming Monthly	3.625/10 (Note: Four critics of Electronic Gaming Monthly gave the game each a score of 5/10, 3.5/10, 2/10, and 4/10.)
Game Informer	5/10
GamePro	4.5/5 (Note: GamePro gave the game two 4.5/5 scores for graphics and overall fun factor, and two 4/5 scores for sound and control.)
GameRevolution	D
GameSpot	4.3/10
IGN	4.8/10
N64 Magazine	25%
Nintendo Power	6.3/10

Fox Sports College Hoops '99 received mixed reviews according to the review aggregation website GameRankings. GamePro felt that the game had extremely intelligent artificial intelligence and praised the game overall. IGN's Peer Schneider criticized the arcade-style slowdown that happened during shooting. GameSpot's Nelson Taruc called the game an "incomplete work in progress".
