= Full Fat =

British video game developer

- Company type: Private
- Industry: Video games
- Founded: Leamington Spa, England, UK (1996)
- Founder: Paul Adams
- Headquarters: Warwick, England, UK
- Area served: Worldwide
- Products: Agent Dash; Flick Golf! Flick Golf Extreme! NFL Flick Quarterback; Coin Drop! Flick Soccer!
- Website: fullfat.com

Full Fat is an independent British video game developer. The company was founded in 1996. The company's specialty has been developing games for hand-held devices including Nintendo's Game Boy, Game Boy Advance, Nintendo DS, Sony's PlayStation Portable (PSP), and lately mobile devices (iOS and Android). Other platforms include Sega's Dreamcast, Nintendo's Wii, and Microsoft Windows. Originally based in Leamington Spa, England, the company moved to Coventry in 2001 and Warwick in 2011.

== Developed titles ==
iOS

- Sugar Rush
- NFL Kicker 13
- NFL Quarterback 13
- Agent Dash
- NFL Kicker!
- NFL Flick Quarterback
- Flick Soccer!
- Flick Golf Extreme!
- Coin Drop!
- Hotspot Football
- Flick Golf!
- Zombie Flick
- Deadball Specialist

Android

- Sugar Rush
- NFL Kicker 13
- NFL Quarterback 13
- Agent Dash
- NFL Kicker!
- NFL Flick Quarterback
- Flick Soccer!
- Flick Golf Extreme!
- Coin Drop!
- Flick Golf!
- Zombie Flick

DS

- Harry Potter and the Deathly Hallows – Part 2
- Harry Potter and the Deathly Hallows – Part 1
- The Sims 2: Apartment Pets
- The Sims 2: Castaway
- The Sims 2: Pets
- Spore Hero Arena
- Littlest Pet Shop
- Jambo! Safari
- Biker Mice from Mars
- Harlem Globetrotters: World Tour
- Touch Darts

GBA

- The Grim Adventures of Billy & Mandy
- Harlem Globetrotters: World Tour
- Pac-Man World 2
- Pac-Man World
- Ms. Pac-Man Maze Madness
- Backyard Skateboarding
- Beyblade G-Revolution
- Beyblade V-Force
- Monopoly
- Sim City 2000
- Aggressive Inline
- Dave Mirra Freestyle BMX 3
- Dave Mirra Freestyle BMX 2
- Justice League: Chronicles
- Punch King
- Animaniacs: Hollywood Hypnotics (cancelled)
- Freekstyle
- The Land Before Time

PSP

- Advent Shadow (cancelled)
- Sid Meier's Pirates!
- Xyanide

Wii

- My Sims Collection
- Littlest Pet Shop
- Jambo! Safari

3DS

- Flick Golf 3D
