= Left Field Productions =

American video game developer

- Logo used from 1995 to 2002
- Type: Private
- Industry: Video games
- Founded: January 5, 1994
- Defunct: 2011
- Fate: Closed
- Headquarters: Ventura County, California, US
- Products: Video games

Left Field Productions, Inc. was an American video game developer based in Ventura, California. It is best known for developing the acclaimed Nintendo 64 game Excitebike 64.

== History ==
The company was founded in 1994 by industry veterans John Brandwood, Jeff Godfrey and Mike Lamb, both of whom were vetarans of the shrinking independent game developer Malibu Interactive, during the mass layoffs at the company.

The company's first game they developed was the Slam 'n Jam basketball games from Crystal Dynamics, but interest soon built enough attraction from Nintendo to develop a basketball game for Nintendo 64.

In April 1998, Nintendo announced the purchase of a minority interest in Left Field Productions, allowing them to expand operations and ensuring a steady flow of exclusive content from the developer.

In 1999, the company expanded to develop games for the Game Boy Color handheld. In 2000, the company designed its pinball game engine, used for The Little Mermaid II: Pinball Frenzy, and the Game Boy Color version of 3-D Ultra Pinball: Thrillride. Also that year, the company became an early adopter of Nintendo GameCube's development tools.

In September 2002, after months of speculation, Left Field bought out Nintendo's stake in the company, once again becoming a fully independent third-party developer. The company then made its multi-platform debut after being third-party with MTX Mototrax for Activision.

The studio closed in 2011, shortly after releasing Mayhem to mixed reviews.

== Games developed ==
Year	Title	Platforms
1995	Slam 'N Jam '95	3DO
1996	Slam 'N Jam '96 Featuring Magic & Kareem	PlayStation, Saturn
1996	Slam 'N Jam	MS-DOS
1998	Kobe Bryant in NBA Courtside	Nintendo 64
1999	Disney's Beauty and the Beast: A Board Game Adventure	Game Boy Color
1999	NBA 3 on 3 featuring Kobe Bryant	Game Boy Color
1999	NBA Courtside 2: Featuring Kobe Bryant	Nintendo 64
2000	3-D Ultra Pinball: Thrillride	Game Boy Color
2000	Disney's The Little Mermaid II: Pinball Frenzy	Game Boy Color
2000	Excitebike 64	Nintendo 64 (iQue)
2002	Backyard Football	GameCube
2002	NBA Courtside 2002	GameCube
2004	MTX Mototrax	PS2, Xbox, Windows, Mac
2005	World Series of Poker	GameCube, PS2, PlayStation Portable, Xbox
2006	MTX Mototrax	PlayStation Portable
2006	World Series of Poker: Tournament of Champions	PS2, Xbox 360, PlayStation Portable, Wii
2006	Dave Mirra BMX Challenge	PlayStation Portable
2007	Dave Mirra BMX Challenge	Wii
2007	World Series of Poker: Battle for the Bracelets	PS3, PS2, Xbox 360, PlayStation Portable
2007	Nitrobike	Wii, PS2
2008	SCORE International Baja 1000	Xbox 360, PS3, PS2, Wii
2009	Battle Poker	Wii, PlayStation Portable
2011	Mayhem	Xbox 360, PS3

=== Canceled projects ===
A GameCube version of MTX Mototrax was in the works but was later canceled as publisher Activision scaled back support for the platform.

A sequel to the Nintendo 64 game 1080° Snowboarding was in development at Left Field at one time. Development originated on the Nintendo 64 platform but was later shifted to the GameCube once Nintendo began phasing out the Nintendo 64. When Left Field separated with Nintendo in early 2002, Nintendo Software Technology took over development of the game, releasing 1080° Avalanche in December 2003. It is unknown how far into production the game was when Left Field left the project, or just how much, if any, of Left Field's work is present in the final game.

== Awards ==
- Best Extreme Sports Game – MTX Mototrax (2004, Play Magazine)
- IGN Editor's Choice Award – Excitebike 64 (2000, IGN)
- IGN Editor's Choice Award – MTX Mototrax (2004, IGN)
- IGN Editor's Choice Award – NBA Courtside 2: Featuring Kobe Bryant (1999, IGN)
