= Slam 'N Jam '95 =

1995 video game

- North American cover art
- Developer: Left Field Productions
- Publisher: Crystal Dynamics
- Producer: Bill Mitchell
- Designers: Andy Trapani; Lyle Hall; Sam Player
- Programmers: John Brandwood; Michael Lamb
- Artists: Jeff Godfrey; Russell Truelove
- Writer: Mark T. Sneed
- Composers: Burke Trieschmann; Steven Henifin
- Series: Slam 'N Jam
- Platform: 3DO
- Release: NA: 1995; EU: 1995; JP: 30 June 1995
- Genres: Sports (basketball)
- Modes: Single-player, multiplayer

Slam 'N Jam '95 (Note: Also known as Slam 'N Jam '95: 3D Basketball (Japanese: スラムジャム: 3D バスケットボール, Hepburn: Suramu Jamu: 3D Basukettobōru) in Japan.) is a sports video game developed by Left Field Productions and published by Crystal Dynamics for the 3DO. It was followed by a sequel, Slam 'N Jam '96 featuring Magic & Kareem, released for PlayStation, Sega Saturn, and MS-DOS the following year.

== Gameplay ==
Slam 'N Jam '95 is a basketball game, but is not licensed by the NBA.

== Development ==
Slam 'N Jam '95 was the first game developed by California-based studio Left Field Productions. The company was founded in 1994 by gaming industry veterans Mike Lamb, John Brandwood, and Jeff Godfrey. While Lamb and Branwood served as programmers on Slam 'N Jam, Godfrey was its lead artist. According to Scott Steinburg, marketing director for the game's publisher Crystal Dynamics, the design chose a "revolutionary approach" with new 32-bit technology rather than trying to evolve what was already on the market. This meant having the camera follow the ball; large, rotoscoped sprites; and CD quality music and sound. CNN sports broadcaster Van Earl Wright lent his voice to the game's play-by-play commentary.Van Earl Wright was the announcer's voice for the game.

== Reception ==
Reception

Review scores
Publication	Score
Computer and Video Games	92/100
Edge	7/10
Electronic Gaming Monthly	16.5/20
Game Informer	8.75/10
Game Players	90%
GameFan	95/100
GamePro	3.825/5
Hyper	70%
Next Generation	4/5
3DO Magazine	5/5
Dimension-3	95%
Flux	A
Game Power (IT)	82/100
MAN!AC	81%
Mega Fun	82%
Player One	92%
Play Time	82%
Power Unlimited	53/100
Super GamePower	3.5/5
Ultimate Future Games	79%
Ultimate Gamer	7/10
Video Games (DE)	82%
VideoGames	8/10

Next Generation reviewed the 3DO version of the game, rating it four stars out of five, and stated that "The pace is lightning fast, and when you hear the roar of the crowd, it's bound to give you chills. If you have any interest in the sport at all and own a 3DO, this is a must-have."

Joel Easley from the Kokomo Tribune reviewed the game and stated, "Overall, Slam 'N Jam '95 is a solid two-player title for someone with an acquired athletic taste.

The game won "3DO Sports Game of the Year" for the 1995 3DO Awards, which were conducted through a survey of industry professionals and hardcore gamers.
