= Flick Golf! =

2010 video game

- Developer: Full Fat
- Platform: iOS
- Release: November 23, 2010
- Genre: Sports game
- Mode: Single-player

Flick Golf! is an iOS game developed by Full Fat and released on November 23, 2010. A sequel named Flick Golf Extreme! was released by Full Fat on June 16, 2011.

== Critical reception ==
=== Original ===
The original game has a Metacritic score of 77% based on 6 critic reviews.

No DPad wrote "Flick Golf is another one of those games that you simply can't go wrong with, unless you hate golf games for some reason." Appspy said "Flick Golf! is a great addition to the list of flick-style of sports titles and while it only really offers one form of gameplay, it's polished and great to kill off a few spare minutes." Eurogamer wrote "I found Flick Golf brilliantly stupid; as a representation of badly dressed men hitting balls with skinny sticks, it's completely terrible, but despite its nonsensical mechanics it's impossible to put down." Gamezebo said "Full Fat Productions have made something special with Flick Golf, offering up a perfect pick-up-and-play experience that's easy to learn, difficult to master, wonderfully unique, and impossible to put down." Pocket Gamer UK wrote "Flick Golf is a challenging take on the sport and a welcome – if occasionally frustrating – addition to the ball-flicking subgenre". Slide To Play said "Flick Golf is a fun minigame that gets old quickly due to lack of variety."

=== Extreme ===
Extreme has a Metacritic score of 79% based on 5 critic reviews.

AppSmile said "Pairing the same awesome control mechanics with some crazy new environments, Flick Golf Extreme will put your flicking skills to the ultimate test." AppSpy wrote "Flick Golf never presented itself as a 'realistic' golfing title, so 'Extreme!' takes things to the next level by placing courses in locations that fit its over-the-top style. " 148Apps said "My only complaint would be that load times can seem a little long for when I'm trying to get a quick game in during a commercial break on television or something, but it's certainly worth waiting for - it's also totally understandable when considering the detail in the levels that's been squeezed onto our little devices." TouchArcade said "It's still as enjoyable as the first and considering the game already makes use of slightly weird physics and non-traditional gameplay, the 'extreme' version is a better representation of what Flick Golf is all about: a casual, leaderboard driven golf game." Pocket Gamer UK said "Flick Golf Extreme! isn't a major departure from the original's arcade strokeplay, but the new locations and game mode are still a welcome addition to the formula."
