= Dave Mirra Freestyle BMX (video game) =

2000 video game

- Developers: Z-Axis; Neon Studios (GBC)
- Publisher: Acclaim Entertainment (Note: Released under the Acclaim Max Sports label)
- Series: Dave Mirra Freestyle BMX
- Engine: RenderWare
- Platforms: PlayStation, Game Boy Color, Dreamcast, Microsoft Windows
- Release: PlayStation: NA: September 14, 2000; EU: October 13, 2000; Game Boy Color: NA: November 9, 2000; EU: December 1, 2000; Dreamcast: NA: November 21, 2000; EU: December 8, 2000; Windows: NA: December 15, 2000; EU: January 12, 2001; Maximum Remix; PlayStation: NA: May 21, 2001; EU: June 8, 2001
- Genre: Sports
- Modes: Single-player, multiplayer

Dave Mirra Freestyle BMX is a 2000 BMX video game developed by Z-Axis and published by Acclaim Entertainment under their Acclaim Max Sports label. The game was released on the PlayStation, Game Boy Color, Dreamcast and Microsoft Windows. The player's main objective in the game is to choose one of the riders and work their way through a total of 12 different levels, completing objectives to unlock new equipment. It received "favorable" reviews. A sequel, Dave Mirra Freestyle BMX 2, released in 2001.

== Gameplay ==
Following in the footsteps of the Tony Hawk's Pro Skater series, the player holds the assigned Jump button in preparation of performing a trick and releases it to jump. When in the air, Big Air tricks can be performed that can also be "modified" with the aid of the modifier button, or the Big Air button again (modifiers themselves can also be modified). For example, the player jumps from a ramp and performs a Superman (Big Air trick). The game also features ragdoll physics that are featured primarily in the Wipeout multiplayer game mode.

There are a total of four game modes and twelve levels. The first six levels are all challenge based. The player must complete specific goals in order to advance to the next level. The final six levels are competition based, where the player is judged on their performance in a number of timed runs.

=== Proquest ===
Proquest is the main mode of the game and could also be called career mode. The player chooses one of the riders and seeks to progress through all the levels of the game in a series of two-minute runs. The first six levels are completed by finishing all the set challenges within them, and the competition levels can only be cleared when the player finishes a run worthy of winning the contest. Once the player finishes each successive level, they will receive new bikes (a total of four extra bikes for each player) and clothing. Upon completion of the game, videos of Dave Mirra and Ryan Nyquist and special cheat codes (depending on the character chosen) are unlocked.

=== Session ===
Any unlocked levels can be played here. The player has the same timed runs as in the Proquest mode, but there are no goals to complete, judges to impress or new items to gain. The only real 'objective' of this mode is to improve upon the player's own high score.

=== Freeride ===
In this mode, the player can freely ride any level that has been unlocked in the Proquest mode. There is no time limit, so the real aim of the mode is to allow full and unrestricted exploration of the level to find the best spots to score and to practice performing tricks.

=== 2 Player ===
Note: only the PlayStation and Dreamcast versions have a multiplayer mode.

There are several different multiplayer modes available. Unlike many other similar extreme sports video game titles, the game modes are turn based. As with any other mode, any level unlocked can be played.

- Best Run - Each player has a two-minute run to get the highest score.
- High Five - This mode involves a series of 30 second runs to see which player can get the highest scoring single trick.
- B-M-X - Basically the same as the game mode H-O-R-S-E in the Tony Hawk series—one player does a combination of tricks, and the other player has to gain a higher score than them. Whenever one player fails, they are assigned each successive letter of B-M-X until one player has all the letters and the game finishes.
- Random Spot - The game chooses five random spots in the level to perform tricks in. Each player has 15 seconds to perform the highest-scoring single trick at the designated area.
- Wipeout - Taking advantage of the ragdoll physics is the Wipeout game mode. Each player takes turns in crashing into objects, trying to score the most points (and bodily harm).
- Longest Grind - The player who performs the longest single grind in one run wins.
- Highest Wall Tap - The highest wall tap (Jump button + Right direction button) at any spot in the level wins.
- Big Air Contest - When players ride up on verts, the height of their jump is measured. Therefore, the aim of this game mode is to get the highest measured "air" up a vert.
- Furthest Jump - The player who jumps the furthest wins.
- Longest Manual - Jumping and then pressing Down and holding Down again performs a manual (using Up performs a Nose Wheelie). The player with the longest-held manual wins this game mode.

== Reception ==
Dave Mirra Freestyle BMX

Aggregate scores
| Aggregator | Score | | | |
| Aggregator | Dreamcast | GBC | PC | PS |
|---|---|---|---|---|
| GameRankings | 76% | 71% | 71% | 81% |
| Metacritic | 73/100 | N/A | 73/100 | 82/100 |

Review scores
| Publication | Score | | | |
| Publication | Dreamcast | GBC | PC | PS |
|---|---|---|---|---|
| CNET Gamecenter | N/A | N/A | N/A | 7/10 |
| Computer Gaming World | N/A | N/A | 3/5 | N/A |
| Electronic Gaming Monthly | 8/10 | 9/10 | N/A | 7.33/10 (Note: Two critics of Electronic Gaming Monthly gave the PlayStation version each a score of 7.5/10, and the other gave it 7/10.) |
| EP Daily | 8.5/10 | N/A | N/A | 8.5/10 |
| Eurogamer | N/A | N/A | N/A | 7/10 |
| Game Informer | 8/10 | N/A | N/A | 7.75/10 |
| GameFan | N/A | N/A | N/A | 95% (Note: In GameFan's viewpoint of the PlayStation version, one critic gave it 96, and the other 94.) |
| GameRevolution | B+ | N/A | N/A | B+ |
| GameSpot | 3.6/10 | 7.1/10 | 6.6/10 | 6.5/10 |
| GameSpy | 8.5/10 | N/A | N/A | N/A |
| IGN | 8.6/10 | 7/10 | 6.5/10 | 8/10 |
| Next Generation | 3/5 | N/A | N/A | N/A |
| Official U.S. PlayStation Magazine | N/A | N/A | N/A | 3.5/5 |
| PC Gamer (UK) | N/A | N/A | 67% | N/A |
| The Cincinnati Enquirer | N/A | N/A | N/A | 3.5/5 |

The PlayStation version of Dave Mirra Freestyle BMX received "favorable" reviews, while the Dreamcast and PC versions received "average" reviews, according to the review aggregation website Metacritic. Garrett Kenyon of NextGen called the Dreamcast version "a bit of a surprise, and an extremely pleasant one."

Lamchop of GamePro said of the PlayStation version in one review, "While Tony Hawk fans may jeer at the blatant copycat approach, BMX stunt fans will applaud this fun game." (Note: GamePro gave the PlayStation version three 4.5/5 scores for graphics, control, and fun factor, and 5/5 for sound in one review.) In another GamePro review, Iron Thumbs said that the same console version was "is in no way flawless, but once you get the hang of it, it's a fun game. If you like biking, and enjoy exercising patience, this might be the ultimate game for you." (Note: GamePro gave the PlayStation version two 3.5/5 scores for graphics and sound, and two 4/5 scores for control and fun factor in another review.) However, Four-Eyed Dragon said that in spite of the music, the Dreamcast version "has no style at all. Skip it at all costs." (Note: GamePro gave the Dreamcast version 3/5 for graphics, 4/5 for sound, and two 2.5/5 scores for control and fun factor.)

Chris Simpson of AllGame gave the PlayStation version three-and-a-half stars out of five, saying, "Although Dave Mirra Freestyle BMX has some noticeable flaws, it provides a very fun and entertaining experience." Jon Thompson later gave the Dreamcast version four stars out of five, saying that "while it won't ever win any awards for originality, it still manages to be a solid title that is actually great fun to play, once you get used to the controls." GameZone gave the latter version 8.5 out of 10, calling it "a high-flying game that showcases some of the best stunts performed by the cream of the BMX freewheeling crop." Edge, however, gave the former version six out of ten, saying, "It's still a lot of fun and surprisingly addictive, but the title should have been significantly smoother, both visually and in terms of playability." Brett Todd of Computer Games Strategy Plus gave the PC version four stars out of five, calling it "one of the most rewarding console-style games to grace the computer in some time. Those of you searching for another stunt-happy extreme sports game would be advised to give this one a shot. It may lack a few options and some of the depth that computer gamers normally require from their purchases, but few currently available action titles boast such compelling action."

=== Maximum Remix ===
Dave Mirra Freestyle BMX: Maximum Remix

Aggregate score
| Aggregator | Score |
|---|---|
| Metacritic | 67/100 |

Review scores
| Publication | Score |
|---|---|
| Electronic Gaming Monthly | 8/10 |
| Game Informer | 7.25/10 |
| GameSpot | 5.4/10 |
| GameZone | 8/10 |
| IGN | 5.5/10 |
| Next Generation | 3/5 |
| Official U.S. PlayStation Magazine | 2.5/5 |
| PlayStation: The Official Magazine | 5/10 |

The Maximum Remix version received "average" reviews according to Metacritic. Jeff Lundrigan of NextGen said of the game, "It ain't bad, but if you own Dave Mirra, there aren't a ton of reasons to buy this." Jake The Snake of GamePro said of the game, "Even though a better BMX game—Mat Hoffman's Pro BMX—has been released since the first Dave Mirra, the core gameplay of Mirra hasn't been much improved, just expanded. So only huge fans of the original and diehard BMX gamers will want this title." (Note: GamePro gave the Maximum Remix version two 3.5/5 scores for graphics and sound, and two 4/5 scores for control and fun factor.)
