= Dave Mirra Freestyle BMX =

- Genre: Racing
- Developers: Z-Axis (2000–01); Neon Studios (2000); Full Fat (2001–02); Left Field Productions (2006–07)
- Publishers: Acclaim Max Sports (2000–02); Crave Entertainment (2006)
- Platforms: PlayStation, Game Boy Color, Dreamcast, Microsoft Windows, PlayStation 2, GameCube, Xbox, PlayStation Portable, Wii
- First release: Dave Mirra Freestyle BMX AliAs; September 14, 2000
- Latest release: Dave Mirra BMX Challenge; November 2, 2006

Dave Mirra Freestyle BMX is a sports video game series that was originally developed by Z-Axis and published by Acclaim Max Sports. Neon Studios originally developed the handheld port before Full Fat took over developing the handheld ports. After Acclaim went bankrupt in 2004, Left Field Productions developed a final entry in the series, 2006's Dave Mirra BMX Challenge.

== Games ==
Aggregate review scores
Game	Metacritic
Dave Mirra Freestyle BMX	(DC) 73/100 (GBC) 71% (Note: GameRankings score) (PC) 73/100 (PS1) 82/100
Dave Mirra Freestyle BMX: Maximum Remix	(PS1) 67/100
Dave Mirra Freestyle BMX 2	(GBA) 85/100 (GC) 78/100 (PS2) 81/100 (Xbox) 76/100
Dave Mirra Freestyle BMX 3	(GBA) 78/100
Dave Mirra BMX Challenge	(PSP) 32/100 (Wii) 36/100

=== Dave Mirra Freestyle BMX (2000) ===
Information needed

=== Dave Mirra Freestyle BMX: Maximum Remix (2001) ===
Information needed

=== Dave Mirra Freestyle BMX 2 (2001) ===
Information needed

=== Dave Mirra Freestyle BMX 3 (2002) ===
Information needed

=== Dave Mirra BMX Challenge (2006) ===
Information needed
