= Underground Development =

American video game developer

Underground Development, Ltd.
- Formerly: Z-Axis, Ltd. (1994–2008)
- Type: Subsidiary
- Industry: Video games
- Founded: 1994; 32 years ago in San Mateo, California, U.S.
- Founder: David Luntz
- Defunct: February 12, 2010
- Fate: Dissolved
- Headquarters: Foster City, California, U.S.
- Number of employees: <45 (2008)
- Parent: Activision (2002–2010)

Underground Development, Ltd. (formerly Z-Axis, Ltd.) was an American video game developer based in Foster City, California. It was founded in 1994 by David Luntz and sold to Activision in May 2002. Following a rebranding to Underground Development in February 2008, the company was closed in February 2010.

== History ==
Z-Axis was founded by David Luntz in 1994, originally located in San Mateo, California. On May 22, 2002, Activision announced that they had acquired Z-Axis in exchange for a payment of US$20.5 million in cash and stock, and up to 93,446 additional shares in Activision linked to the studio's performance. At the time, the studio was located in Hayward, California. In February 2008, Z-Axis was rebranded as Underground Development.

Activision reported in April 2008 that they were closing Underground Development, which had the time had under 45 employees in a Foster City, California office, at the end of the coming May. The studio was fully closed on February 12, 2010.

== Games developed as Z-Axis ==
| Year | Title | Platform(s) |
|---|---|---|
| 1996 | Madden NFL '96 | Sega Genesis |
| 1998 | Fox Sports College Hoops '99 | Nintendo 64 |
| 1999 | Alexi Lalas International Soccer | PlayStation, Microsoft Windows, Game Boy Color |
| 1999 | Space Invaders | PlayStation, Microsoft Windows, Nintendo 64 |
| 1999 | Thrasher Presents Skate and Destroy | PlayStation |
| 2000 | Freestyle Motocross: McGrath vs Pastrana | PlayStation |
| 2000 | Dave Mirra Freestyle BMX | PlayStation, Game Boy Color, Dreamcast, Microsoft Windows |
| 2001 | Dave Mirra Freestyle BMX: Maximum Remix | PlayStation |
| 2001 | Dave Mirra Freestyle BMX 2 | PlayStation 2, GameCube, Game Boy Advance, Xbox |
| 2002 | Aggressive Inline | PlayStation 2, GameCube, Game Boy Advance, Xbox |
| 2002 | BMX XXX | PlayStation 2, GameCube, Xbox |
| 2006 | X-Men: The Official Game | PlayStation 2, Xbox, Xbox 360 |
| Cancelled | Mat Hoffman's Pro BMX 3 | PlayStation 2, GameCube, Xbox |
| Cancelled | Iron Man | PlayStation 2, GameCube, Xbox |

== Games developed as Underground Development ==
| Year | Title | Platform(s) |
|---|---|---|
| 2009 | Guitar Hero: Van Halen | PlayStation 2, PlayStation 3, Wii, Xbox 360 |
| Cancelled | Call of Duty: Devil's Brigade | Xbox 360 |
