= Dave Mirra Freestyle BMX 2 =

2001 video game

- Developers: Z-Axis; Full Fat (GBA)
- Publisher: Acclaim Entertainment (Note: Released under the Acclaim Max Sports label)
- Series: Dave Mirra Freestyle BMX
- Platforms: PlayStation 2, GameCube, Game Boy Advance, Xbox
- Release: September 6, 2001: PlayStation 2; NA: September 6, 2001; EU: October 5, 2001 GameCube; NA: November 18, 2001; EU: May 3, 2002 Game Boy Advance; NA: November 20, 2001; EU: February 15, 2002 Xbox; NA: November 29, 2001; EU: March 14, 2002
- Genre: Sports
- Modes: Single-player, multiplayer

Dave Mirra Freestyle BMX 2 is a 2001 BMX video game developed by Z-Axis and published by Acclaim Entertainment under their Acclaim Max Sports label. It is the sequel to Dave Mirra Freestyle BMX. It was released for the PlayStation 2 in August 2001, and in the following months it was ported to the GameCube, Game Boy Advance, and Xbox video game systems. Both the GameCube and Xbox ports featured two extra levels that were not present in the PS2 version.

In the game, players can take on the role of one of 13 top BMX riders, or a number of other characters. Along with the pro riders, there are 3 hidden characters. One of which was teenager Mike Dias, who won the grand prize in the Slim Jim Sweepstakes, getting his likeness put into the game, the Slim Jim guy from the commercials, and Amish Boy, who rode with a corn cob pipe on a wooden bike. It received "favorable" reviews.

== Gameplay ==
The game has several different modes of play.

=== Proquest ===
The first, and main mode is Proquest, a story mode (single player). The player selects a character to portray, and then has several 3 minute runs to complete set goals (ranking from Beginner to Insane), such as grinding 50 meters down a grind bar or scoring 50,000 points in a single run. By completing these quests, the player earns respect points. After collecting enough respect points, they then unlock new areas and bikes. In each new area the set of goals is different. After earning enough points, the player will be invited to a competition, where they have to show their skills at biking by not only scoring high, but also by performing a variety of tricks, modifiers, spins, and grinds. Players can also earn 1000 respect points by finding all the gaps in a particular park. Gaps, as the name implies, are gaps between two items, such as between two jumps, or from one side of a river to another.

=== Session ===
In Session mode, players take part in 3 minute runs just as with Proquest mode, but without set goals. Players can simply try to score high, or explore different areas of the park, break records, and discover gaps.

=== Freeride ===
In Freeride, players take part in runs without any time limits. This mode is useful if one is just trying to explore all the nooks and crannies of the park or attempting to discover secrets. The player cannot break records or discover gaps, since there is no time limit, and it is technically considered cheating. Therefore, any score gained is disregarded.

=== Park Editor ===
The Park Editor is a fairly powerful feature of the game that allows the user to create their own Bikepark to ride in the Session, Multiplayer and Freeride game modes. The park is created by placing premade objects on a blank area of a themed map. Gaps between objects can also be added. The player can then save the park and ride it. Players cannot, however, create goals like the ones featured in Proquest.

=== Multiplayer ===
Two people can play different game types in this mode, on any level unlocked or created. Being one of the major areas where the game could have used improvement, Dave Mirra Freestyle BMX 2 supports only two players at one time, and they must alternate instead of playing simultaneously (as in many other extreme sports titles). One of the multiplayer games was similar to the basketball game "HORSE", with the exception that players can name the game whatever they chose. The object of the game was to perform a trick, and then the next player would have to perform the same trick, otherwise end up with a letter. Once the word was complete, the game was over. Another one was called Wipeout. The two players took turns crashing the hardest to get points. Who ever had the most points in a single hit wins.

== Reception ==
Reception

Aggregate score
Aggregator	Score			
Aggregator	GBA	GameCube	PS2	Xbox
Metacritic	85/100	78/100	81/100	76/100

Review scores
Publication	Score			
Publication	GBA	GameCube	PS2	Xbox
AllGame	N/A	N/A	3.5/5	N/A
Edge	N/A	N/A	6/10	N/A
Electronic Gaming Monthly	N/A	8.5/10	8.33/10 (Note: Two critics of Electronic Gaming Monthly gave the PlayStation 2 version each a score of 8.5/10, and the other gave it 8/10.)	N/A
EP Daily	N/A	8/10	N/A	N/A
Game Informer	8.25/10	8.75/10	9/10	9/10
GameRevolution	N/A	N/A	N/A	B
GameSpot	9.2/10	6.9/10	7/10	7.4/10
GameSpy	83%	84%	75%	79%
GameZone	6.9/10	8.7/10	7.5/10	N/A
IGN	8.4/10	8/10	8/10	6.9/10
Next Generation	N/A	N/A	4/5	4/5
Nintendo Power	3.3/5	3.5/5	N/A	N/A
Official U.S. PlayStation Magazine	N/A	N/A	3.5/5	N/A
Official Xbox Magazine (US)	N/A	N/A	N/A	8.7/10
Maxim	N/A	N/A	5/5	N/A

Dave Mirra Freestyle BMX 2 received "generally favorable reviews" on all platforms according to video game review aggregator Metacritic. Jim Preston of NextGen's December 2001 issue said that the PlayStation 2 version has "tons o' tricks; gigantic, engaging levels; a park editor; and excellent challenges. What more do you need?" The magazine later said of the Xbox version in its final issue: "We wish the graphics were a little more polished, but if you're looking for fun (with brutal-looking injuries when you crash), then this is the game to get."

Four-Eyed Dragon of GamePro said that the PlayStation 2 version "mixes a wealth of features to make it worth your time. Even though it's the only BMX game for the PS2 to date, it's much better than any other freestyle biking game for any other system." (Note: GamePro gave the PlayStation 2 version three 4/5 scores for graphics, sound, and fun factor, and 3/5 for control.) He later called the GameCube version "a good, solid biking game---but rent it first to make sure it's the right BMX game for you." (Note: GamePro gave the GameCube version 3/5 for graphics, 4/5 for sound, and two 3.5/5 scores for control and fun factor.)

The game was nominated at The Electric Playground's 2001 Blister Awards for "Best Console Extreme Sports Game", but lost to NHL Hitz 2002.
