= BMG Interactive =

American defunct video game publisher

- Type: Division
- Industry: Computer and video games
- Founded: 1993; 33 years ago
- Defunct: 1998
- Fate: Acquired by Take-Two Interactive
- Successor: Rockstar Games
- Headquarters: New York City, New York, United States
- Parent: Bertelsmann Music Group

BMG Interactive was an American video game publisher based in New York. It was founded in 1993 by BMG and closed in 1998 and it was succeeded by Rockstar Games. The company maintained offices in France, Belgium, Sweden, Norway, The Netherlands, Germany, Japan, Singapore and Australia, as well as New York City.

== History ==
=== Origins and signing of partnerships ===
In 1993, Bertelsmann Music Group entered into the interactive entertainment industry by signing a deal with Ion to produce music and multimedia entertainment products, including video games. In 1994, Bertelsmann Music Group signed a deal with Crystal Dynamics to distribute titles, received funding to the game publisher Rocket Science Games, and later the company founded BMG Interactive Entertainment. It was led by Sam Houser.

The company's original plan was to license titles from third-party US publishers for the European market, most notably games published in North America by Rocket Science Games. In late 1994, the company signed a deal with Nederlander Communications, and Israeli-based production firm Pixel Multimedia to form a joint venture company RealTime Sports. The company later expanded into the Japanese market in late 1994 around the same time the company was founded.

In late 1994, Strauss Zelnick, the former head of Crystal Dynamics, joined the company to serve as operations for the North American business. The company expanded by running a San Francisco office, led by Don Traeger of Electronic Arts, and a European division, in addition to the New York office. In 1995, the company signed a deal with Boss Game Studios for the development of its titles.

in 1995, the company signed a development deal with DMA Design, where BMG could publish DMA Design's titles. The publishing agreement with BMG Interactive covered Race'n'Chase, Space Station Silicon Valley, Tanktics, and the stealth game Covert. In 1996, the company entered into the sports gaming industry by signing a partnership with game developer Z-Axis for the development of its titles. Also that year, the company signed a deal with Major League Soccer to endorse a soccer game for development by Z-Axis.

By the point, the company became the largest publisher of European video games, with partnerships involving Berkeley Systems, Boss Game Studios, Crystal Dynamics, DMA Design, Interactive Studios, Lobotomy Software, Montparnasse Multimedia, New Level Software, Virtual Music Productions, Z-Axis, Zombie Studios and others. In 1997, the company shipped its first North American game, Spider: The Video Game, to stores. The company attempted to start a US office in 1997, but it was never materialized.

=== Closure of operations and sale ===
In 1997, BMG Interactive announced that it had shuttered its U.S. operations after the commercial failure of games like Spider: The Video Game, leaving the future of the games planned for U.S. release, like Space Station Silicon Valley, Spec Ops, Major League Soccer, Mass Destruction, Grand Theft Auto and Courier Crisis in limbo. In late 1997 and early 1998, the company sold the publishing rights of Mass Destruction and Grand Theft Auto to ASC Games, Spec Ops to Ripcord Games, a basketball game to Fox Interactive, Dragon Blade to an unspecified publisher (later revealed to be Gathering of Developers), a flight simulator to Electronic Arts under Jane's Combat Simulations, Spearhead to Interactive Magic, and Courier Crisis to GT Interactive.

On March 12, 1998, Take-Two Interactive announced its acquisition of the assets of dormant British video game publisher BMG Interactive from BMG Entertainment (a unit of Bertelsmann). In exchange, Take-Two was to issue 1.85 million shares (around 16%) of its common stock to BMG Entertainment. Through this acquisition, Take-Two obtained several of BMG Interactive's former intellectual properties, including Three Lions, Monkey Hero, Biosys and DMA Design's Grand Theft Auto and Space Station Silicon Valley. The deal was announced to have closed on March 25. Three BMG Interactive executives—Dan Houser, Sam Houser, and Jamie King—as well as Gary Foreman of BMG Interactive and Terry Donovan of BMG Entertainment's Arista Records record label, subsequently moved to New York City to work for Take-Two Interactive. In a restructuring announced that April, Sam Houser was appointed as Take-Two's "vice president of worldwide product development". In December 1998, the Houser brothers, Donovan and King established Rockstar Games as the "high-end" publishing label of Take-Two and as a successor to BMG. The formation was formally announced on January 22, 1999.

== Games ==
Title	Platform	Release date	Developer(s)	Ref.
PaTaank	3DO Interactive Multiplayer	November 3, 1994	PF.Magic	
Gex	3DO Interactive Multiplayer	November 16, 1994	Crystal Dynamics	
Gex	PlayStation	March 8, 1996	Crystal Dynamics	
Gex	Sega Saturn	March 29, 1996	Crystal Dynamics	
Off-World Interceptor	3DO Interactive Multiplayer	December 16, 1994	Crystal Dynamics	
Samurai Shodown	3DO Interactive Multiplayer	December 1994	Crystal Dynamics	
Star Control II	3DO Interactive Multiplayer	December 1994	Toys for Bob	
Backpacker	Microsoft Windows	January 1995	TATI Miximedia	
VR Stalker	3DO Interactive Multiplayer	April 1995	Morpheus Interactive	
Slam 'n Jam '95	3DO Interactive Multiplayer	July 30, 1995	Crystal Dynamics	
Ballz: The Director's Cut	3DO Interactive Multiplayer	September 14, 1995	PF.Magic	
Total Eclipse Turbo	PlayStation	October 13, 1995	Crystal Dynamics	
Off-World Interceptor Extreme	PlayStation	November 22, 1995	Crystal Dynamics	
Off-World Interceptor Extreme	Sega Saturn	November 22, 1995	Crystal Dynamics	
Cadillacs and Dinosaurs: The Second Cataclysm	MS-DOS	1995	Rocket Science Games	
Loadstar: The Legend of Tully Bodine	MS-DOS	1995	Rocket Science Games	
Hole in One	MS-DOS	1995	Really Interesting Software Company	
Lost Signals	Microsoft Windows	1995	The Red Balloon	
L'odysee de Morgan	Microsoft Windows	1995	Morgan Productions	
L'odysee de Morgan	Macintosh	1995	Morgan Productions	
Battle Beast	Microsoft Windows	1995	7th Level	
Bermuda Syndrome	Microsoft Windows	1995	Century Electronics	
The Horde	Sega Saturn	March 8, 1996	Toys for Bob	
Titan Wars	Sega Saturn	April 19, 1996	Crystal Dynamics	
Bishojo Variety Game: Rapyulus Panic	Sega Saturn	April 26, 1996	Shoeisha	
Tsuukai!! Slot Shooting	Sega Saturn	June 14, 1996	Shoeisha	
Ippatsu Gyakuten Gambling King no Michi	Sega Saturn	July 5, 1996	Planning Office Wada	
Gekiretsu Pachinkazu	Sega Saturn	August 2, 1996	Planning Office Wada	
Slam 'n Jam '96 featuring Magic & Kareem	Sega Saturn	August 8, 1996	Left Field Productions	
Slam 'n Jam '96 featuring Magic & Kareem	PlayStation	August 8, 1996	Left Field Productions	
Exhumed	PlayStation	October 1996	Lobotomy Software	
Exhumed	Microsoft Windows	October 1996	Lobotomy Software	
Exhumed	Sega Saturn	October 1996	Lobotomy Software	
The Pink Panther: Passport to Peril	Microsoft Windows	October 1996	Wanderlust Interactive	
Special Gift Pack	Sega Saturn	November 8, 1996	Shoeisha	
Pandemonium!	PlayStation	November 1996	Toys for Bob	
Firo & Klawd	PlayStation	November 1996	Interactive Studios	
Firo & Klawd	Microsoft Windows	November 1996	Interactive Studios	
Duck City	Microsoft Windows	1996	Domestic Funk Products	
Duck City	Macintosh	1996	Domestic Funk Products	
Arcade America	Microsoft Windows	1996	7th Level	
Arcade America	Macintosh	1996	7th Level	
Shine	Microsoft Windows	1996	Chilli	
Shine	Macintosh	1996	Chilli	
Backpacker 2	Microsoft Windows	January 1997	TAXI Miximedia	
3D Baseball	Sega Saturn	January 31, 1997	Crystal Dynamics	
3D Baseball	PlayStation	February 28, 1997	Crystal Dynamics	
Spider: The Video Game	PlayStation	February 26, 1997	Boss Game Studios	
Mass Destruction	Sega Saturn	March 26, 1997	NMS Software	
Mass Destruction	PlayStation	November 1997	NMS Software	
Mass Destruction	Microsoft Windows	November 1997	NMS Software	
Blood Omen: Legacy of Kain	PlayStation	May 30, 1997	Silicon Knights	
Seikai Risshiden: Yoi Kuni - Yoi Seij	Sega Saturn	July 27, 1997	Digitalware	
Courier Crisis	PlayStation	November 20, 1997	New Level Software	
Courier Crisis	Sega Saturn	December 20, 1997	New Level Software	
Grand Theft Auto	MS-DOS	November 28, 1997	DMA Design	
Grand Theft Auto	Microsoft Windows	November 28, 1997	DMA Design	
Grand Theft Auto	PlayStation	December 12, 1997	Visual Sciences	
Wing Nuts: Battle in the Sky	Microsoft Windows	1997	Rocket Science Games	
Evidence: Wer toete Sarah Hopkins?	Microsoft Windows	1997	Microids	
Teazle	Microsoft Windows	1997	Aniware AB	
Teazle	Macintosh	1997	Aniware AB	
Jungle Park: Saturn Jima	Sega Saturn	January 15, 1998	Digitalware	
Three Lions	PlayStation	April 17, 1998	Z-Axis	
