= David Vine (anthropologist) =

American anthropologist and author

Academic background
- Education: Wesleyan University (BA, 1997); Hunter College and CUNY Graduate Center (MA, 2003); CUNY Graduate Center (PhD, 2006)
- Thesis: Empire's Footprint: Expulsion and the U.S. Military Base on Diego Garcia (2006)

Academic work
- Discipline: Anthropology
- Sub-discipline: Political anthropology
- Institutions: American University (2006–2024)
- Notable works: Island of Shame (2009); Base Nation (2015); The United States of War (2020)
- Website: www.davidvine.net

David Vine is an American political anthropologist and author who writes about United States military bases abroad and American wars. He was a professor of anthropology at American University in Washington, D.C., from 2006 to 2024. He is the author of Island of Shame: The Secret History of the U.S. Military Base on Diego Garcia (2009), Base Nation: How U.S. Military Bases Abroad Harm America and the World (2015) and The United States of War: A Global History of America's Endless Conflicts, from Columbus to the Islamic State (2020), the last of which was a finalist for the Los Angeles Times Book Prize in history.

Vine began researching the Chagossians, the people expelled from the Chagos Archipelago to make way for the US base on Diego Garcia, in 2001, when he was a graduate student and the lawyer Michael Tigar sought his help with the islanders' litigation. Island of Shame, the history of the base and the expulsion that grew out of that work, was praised by reviewers including Jonathan Freedland in The New York Review of Books. Reviewers of Base Nation commended its research while questioning parts of its evidence and argument. He has also led research on displacement caused by the United States' wars since 2001 and co-founded a coalition that campaigns for the closure of overseas bases.

== Education and career ==
Vine graduated from Wesleyan University in 1997 with a bachelor's degree in sociology. He received a master's degree in anthropology from Hunter College and the Graduate Center of the City University of New York in 2003, and a PhD in anthropology from the Graduate Center in 2006. His doctoral dissertation, "Empire's Footprint: Expulsion and the U.S. Military Base on Diego Garcia", was the basis of Island of Shame.

At American University he was public anthropologist in residence in 2006–2007, assistant professor from 2007, associate professor from 2013 and professor from 2018. He left the university on September 1, 2024, after 18 years, saying that he wished to devote his work to collaborative efforts to stop wars and repair their damage. Vine says that he donates the royalties from his books to the Chagossian people and to nonprofit organizations serving other victims of war.

== Research on Diego Garcia and the Chagossians ==
In 2001 Tigar, who supervised a law clinic at American University, was preparing a class action in a US federal court against the United States government, officials involved in the expulsion and companies that helped to build the base. According to Vine, Tigar's team was looking for an anthropology or sociology graduate student to carry out research for the suit, and Vine, "troubled by the story and amazed by the opportunity", agreed. With Philip Harvey of Rutgers University School of Law and S. Wojciech Sokolowski of Johns Hopkins University, he studied whether the Chagossians should be considered an indigenous people, documented the harm that displacement had done to their lives, and calculated the compensation owed for some of those damages. The work produced expert reports for the American University law school and the London solicitors Sheridans on whether the former inhabitants of the archipelago were an indigenous people (2003) and on the impoverishment caused by their expulsion ("Dérasiné: The Expulsion and Impoverishment of the Chagossian People", 2005). Vine states that he was never paid for the research, and that the law clinic paid some of his expenses in 2001–2002 and 2004. The US suit, Bancoult v. McNamara, was dismissed.

Between 2001 and 2004 Vine spent more than seven months over four trips living with Chagossian families in Mauritius and the Seychelles, where he conducted more than thirty formal interviews and, with Mauritian interviewers, a survey of more than 320 islanders. He also worked in British, Mauritian and Seychellois archives, and from 2004 interviewed more than thirty former and serving US officials, mainly from the departments of Defense and State and the Navy. As thanks to the Chagos Refugees Group for helping his research, he periodically worked in its office, "primarily providing English translation and clerical assistance". In 2008 he attended the Chagossians' hearing before the House of Lords, which he described for Mother Jones. With Laura Jeffery he wrote a chapter on the lives of Chagossians in Mauritius for a 2011 collection on the expulsion published by Brill.

Island of Shame was published by Princeton University Press in 2009. It tells the story of the expulsion of 1968–1973 partly through Rita Bancoult, the mother of the Chagos Refugees Group's leader Olivier Bancoult. The book traces the base to the "Strategic Island Concept" of the US Navy planner Stuart Barber. Vine writes that he focused on the role of the United States partly because he had found that the US government ordered the expulsion. He describes as "Orwellian" the decision of US and British officials to treat the islanders as transient workers rather than as a permanent population entitled to the safeguards of the United Nations, a pretense that the officials themselves called a "fiction". The book also follows the Chagossians' lives in exile and their protests and lawsuits, and ends by considering what should be done for them and about American empire.

In a 2026 commentary, Human Rights Watch said that the story of US involvement in the expulsion had been uncovered gradually, including through "the work of the academic David Vine". In 2023 Vine appeared alongside Olivier Bancoult on Democracy Now!, where he described the expulsion and the secret US–British agreement behind the base.

== Military bases: Base Nation ==
Base Nation was published in 2015 by Metropolitan Books as part of the American Empire Project. By Vine's count, the United States had about 800 military bases in more than 70 countries, and he visited sites in Germany, Japan, South Korea, Italy and Guam for the book. He estimated that the overseas bases cost more than $70 billion a year. Vine argues that the bases raise military tensions, provoke opposition, support undemocratic governments and cause environmental damage, and that they "perpetuate a 21st-century form of colonialism". Chapters examine profiteering by contractors, the Navy's dealings with Mafia-controlled firms in southern Italy, and sex trafficking around a US air base in South Korea. The book ends with proposals that include closing bases in Okinawa and other bases built for the Cold War. In an interview with NPR, Vine said that the book did not initially call for closing every overseas base but for a debate on the network and a shift toward diplomatic engagement.

== The United States of War ==
The United States of War was published by the University of California Press in 2020. Drawing on research in fourteen countries and territories, it argues that the United States has been at war or has invaded other countries almost every year since independence, tracing the pattern from Columbus's arrival at Guantánamo Bay in 1494. Vine argues that US leaders have locked the country into permanent war by building the world's largest collection of foreign military bases. In the historian Daniel Immerwahr's summary of the argument, "Bases make wars, which make bases". Vine calls for "deimperializing" the United States, and Immerwahr summarized the book's prescription as "You want peace? Close the bases." The book completes what Vine calls a trilogy on war and peace, with Island of Shame and Base Nation.

== Public engagement and advocacy ==
Vine's writing has appeared in The Washington Post, The New York Times, The Guardian and Mother Jones. He has served on the advisory board of Brown University's Costs of War Project since 2010 and on the steering committee of the Network of Concerned Anthropologists since 2007. In 2020 he was the lead author of a Costs of War report, written with students in American University's Public Anthropology Clinic, which estimated that at least 37 million people had been displaced by the eight most violent wars the US military had fought or joined since 2001, and possibly 48–59 million. Vine told The New York Times that the wars had been "horrifically catastrophic, horrifically damaging".

Vine describes himself as a co-founder and coordinator of the Overseas Base Realignment and Closure Coalition, and as a founder of the Network to Dismantle the Military Industrial Complex. In 2019 he and three other members of the coalition, Medea Benjamin, the former congressman John F. Tierney and the retired colonel Lawrence Wilkerson, wrote in The Hill that 41 experts had signed the coalition's open letter asking the Trump administration, the Pentagon and Congress to draw down US bases abroad. A 2021 brief that he co-wrote for the Quincy Institute for Responsible Statecraft estimated that the United States had about 750 military base sites in 80 foreign countries and colonies. He has also worked with Let Us Return USA, a US support committee for the Chagossians.

== Reception and awards ==
=== Island of Shame ===
In The New York Review of Books, Freedland wrote that, in documenting the Chagossians' fate, Vine "has not let them down", and called "persuasive" Vine's account of how the expansionist instincts of the military services drove the base project. The review prompted letters from Richard Barber, a son of Stuart Barber, who wrote that his father had come to regard the expulsion as a great injustice, and from a retired US Navy Reserve officer who defended the base's strategic value. Ebrahim Afsah, reviewing the book in the European Journal of International Law, called it "the best account of this sordid tale so far" and said that Vine "carefully and successfully seeks to present a balanced picture". Afsah criticized its "at times overly informal style" and its treatment of Max Weber's ethic of responsibility, and found "more problematic" Vine's dismissal of Navy concerns about prostitution and sexual relations between personnel and islanders, calling his description of such relations "counterproductive". He nonetheless expected it to "remain for a considerable time the definitive reference" on the base and the people displaced for it.

In The Irish Times, Colin Murphy called the book "an exemplary piece of both socially embedded reportage and investigative journalism", despite "a tendency to indulge in the self-conscious idiom of academic ethnography and reflexive criticism of US 'imperialism'". Jeff Stein in Bookforum described it as a "revealing, sad, and sometimes enraging book", and Latha Jishnu in Business Standard called Vine "a top flight researcher". The book was also reviewed in academic journals including the American Anthropologist, Contemporary British History and The Journal of American History.

=== Base Nation ===
Kirkus Reviews called Base Nation "a frank, significant look" at the proliferation of foreign bases, and Publishers Weekly found its presentation "eloquent and persuasive". Hal Bernton of The Seattle Times described it as "edgy investigative work". In the Los Angeles Review of Books, the geographer Matthew Farish called it a "distressing and tremendously helpful resource", but wrote that its chapters on families and masculinity "lean a little uncomfortably on a blend of generalities, secondary sources, and anecdotes". Caleb Lauer, in The National, wrote that the book conflated different kinds of harm and "never quite comes together as a coherent argument", although Vine's reporting made it worth reading. Writing for the Center for International Maritime Security, Vic Allen, a helicopter pilot and action officer at the Naval History and Heritage Command, criticized the "mushy language in Vine's assessment of the number of bases and their operating costs", but judged that "the overall effect of the book is strong".

=== The United States of War ===
Immerwahr, reviewing the book in The Nation, called it "a revelatory new book" and judged "hard to gainsay" Vine's case that shrinking the base system would "significantly calm the waters", though not prevent US wars entirely. Kirkus Reviews wrote that Vine "offers much to ponder about our militarized foreign policy and its deep antecedents". It was one of five finalists in the history category of the 2020 Los Angeles Times Book Prizes, announced in March 2021. It was reviewed in the American Anthropologist, the Journal of Interdisciplinary History and The Journal of American History.

== Selected works ==
=== Books ===
- Vine, David (2009). Island of Shame: The Secret History of the U.S. Military Base on Diego Garcia. Princeton, NJ: Princeton University Press. ISBN 978-0-691-13869-5.
- Vine, David (2015). Base Nation: How U.S. Military Bases Abroad Harm America and the World. American Empire Project. New York: Metropolitan Books. ISBN 978-1-62779-169-4.
- Vine, David (2020). The United States of War: A Global History of America's Endless Conflicts, from Columbus to the Islamic State. Oakland, CA: University of California Press. doi:10.1525/9780520972070. ISBN 978-0-520-30087-3.

=== Articles and reports ===
- Vine, David (2004). "War and Forced Migration in the Indian Ocean: The US Military Base at Diego Garcia". International Migration. 42 (3): 111–143. doi:10.1111/j.0020-7985.2004.00291.x.
- Vine, David (2008). "Taking on Empires: Reparations, the Right of Return, and the People of Diego Garcia". Souls. 10 (4): 327–343. doi:10.1080/10999940802523869.
- Vine, David (2008). "Decolonizing Britain in the 21st Century? Chagos Islanders Challenge the Crown, House of Lords, 30 June–3 July 2008". Anthropology Today. 24 (4): 26–28. doi:10.1111/j.1467-8322.2008.00603.x.
- Vine, David; Harvey, Philip; Sokolowski, S. Wojciech (2012). "Compensating a People for the Loss of Their Homeland: Diego Garcia, the Chagossians, and the Human Rights Standards Damages Model". Northwestern Journal of International Human Rights. 11 (1): 152–185.
- Vine, David (2012). "What If You Can't Protest the Base? The Chagossian Exile, the Struggle for Democracy, and the Military Base on Diego Garcia". South Atlantic Quarterly. 111 (4): 847–856. doi:10.1215/00382876-1724228.
- Vine, David (2019). "No Bases? Assessing the Impact of Social Movements Challenging US Foreign Military Bases". Current Anthropology. 60 (S19): S158–S172. doi:10.1086/701042.
- Vine, David; Coffman, Cala; Khoury, Katalina; Lovasz, Madison; Bush, Helen; Leduc, Rachael; Walkup, Jennifer (2020). Creating Refugees: Displacement Caused by the United States' Post-9/11 Wars (PDF) (Report). Costs of War Project, Watson Institute, Brown University.
- Vine, David; Deppen, Patterson; Bolger, Leah (September 20, 2021). Drawdown: Improving U.S. and Global Security Through Military Base Closures Abroad (Report). Quincy Brief. Quincy Institute for Responsible Statecraft.

== Sources ==
=== Works by Vine ===
- Benjamin, Medea; Tierney, John; Vine, David; Wilkerson, Lawrence (July 17, 2019). "Military spending has many points of contention: Closing overseas bases isn't one of them". The Hill.
- Jeffery, Laura; Vine, David (2011). "Sorrow, Sadness, and Impoverishment: The Lives of Chagossians in Mauritius". In Evers, Sandra; Kooy, Marry (eds.). Eviction from the Chagos Islands: Displacement and Struggle for Identity Against Two World Powers. Leiden: Brill. pp. 83–102. doi:10.1163/ej.9789004202603.i-293.45.
- Vine, David (August 22, 2008). "Homesick for Camp Justice". Mother Jones.
- Vine, David (2009). Island of Shame: The Secret History of the U.S. Military Base on Diego Garcia. Princeton University Press. ISBN 978-0-691-13869-5.
- Vine, David (November 8, 2021). "Curriculum Vitae" (PDF). American University.
- Vine, David (2024). "Announcement: New Beginnings (and Leaving American University)". davidvine.net.
- Vine, David (n.d.). "Bio/Events". davidvine.net.
- Vine, David; Coffman, Cala; Khoury, Katalina; Lovasz, Madison; Bush, Helen; Leduc, Rachael; Walkup, Jennifer (2020). Creating Refugees: Displacement Caused by the United States' Post-9/11 Wars (PDF) (Report). Costs of War Project, Watson Institute, Brown University.
- Vine, David; Deppen, Patterson; Bolger, Leah (September 20, 2021). Drawdown: Improving U.S. and Global Security Through Military Base Closures Abroad (Report). Quincy Brief. Quincy Institute for Responsible Statecraft.

=== Reviews ===
- Afsah, Ebrahim (2010). "David Vine. Island of Shame. The Secret History of the U.S. Military Base on Diego Garcia". European Journal of International Law. 21 (1): 257–262. doi:10.1093/ejil/chq011.
- Allen, Vic (July 30, 2015). "Base Nation". Center for International Maritime Security.
- Barber, Richard; Chesney, Thomas McC.; Freedland, Jonathan (July 2, 2009). "'Island of Shame': An Exchange on Diego Garcia". The New York Review of Books.
- Bernton, Hal (December 27, 2015). "'Base Nation': the long reach of U.S. military bases worldwide". The Seattle Times.
- Farish, Matthew (March 16, 2016). "Baseworld". Los Angeles Review of Books.
- Freedland, Jonathan (May 28, 2009). "A Black and Disgraceful Site". The New York Review of Books.
- Gady, Franz-Stefan (August 26, 2015). "Are U.S. Military Bases Abroad Harming the United States?". The Diplomat.
- Goldberg, Joyce S. (2022). "The United States of War: A Global History of America's Endless Conflicts, from Columbus to the Islamic State". The Journal of American History. 109 (3): 640–641. doi:10.1093/jahist/jaac354.
- Heiss, Mary Ann (2012). "Island of Shame: The Secret History of the U.S. Military Base on Diego Garcia". The Journal of American History. 99 (1): 369–370. doi:10.1093/jahist/jas120.
- Hewitt, Steve (2011). "Island of Shame: The Secret History of the U.S. Military Base on Diego Garcia". Contemporary British History. 25 (4): 617–618. doi:10.1080/13619462.2011.625813.
- Hirshberg, Lauren (2021). "The United States of War: A Global History of America's Endless Conflicts, from Columbus to the Islamic State". Journal of Interdisciplinary History. 52 (2): 283–284. doi:10.1162/jinh_r_01714.
- Immerwahr, Daniel (November 30, 2020). "The Long Roots of Endless War". The Nation.
- Jishnu, Latha (October 9, 2009). "Diego Garcia's sordid tale". Business Standard.
- Kazi, Nazia (2021). "The United States of War: A Global History of America's Endless Conflicts, from Columbus to the Islamic State". American Anthropologist. 123 (2): 445–446. doi:10.1111/aman.13532.
- "Base Nation". Kirkus Reviews. June 1, 2015.
- "The United States of War". Kirkus Reviews. August 15, 2020.
- Lauer, Caleb (September 24, 2015). "Book review: Base Nation: How U.S. Military Bases Abroad Harm America and the World, maps American military mishaps". The National.
- McCaffrey, Katherine T. (2010). "Island of Shame: The Secret History of the U.S. Military Base on Diego Garcia by David Vine". American Anthropologist. 112 (1): 165. doi:10.1111/j.1548-1433.2009.01213_11.x.
- Murphy, Colin (August 7, 2009). "Shabby truth of a forgotten people sacrificed on altar of US strategic interests". The Irish Times.
- "Base Nation: How U.S. Military Bases Abroad Harm America and the World". Publishers Weekly. June 1, 2015.
- Stein, Jeff (Summer 2009). "Tristes Tropiques". Bookforum.

=== Other sources ===
- Baldwin, Clive (February 17, 2026). "The Injustice in Chagos Continues". Human Rights Watch.
- ""Crime Against Humanity": Exiled from Diego Garcia for U.S. Military Base, Residents Demand to Return". Democracy Now!. October 3, 2023.
- "Base Nation: How U.S. Military Bases Abroad Harm America and the World". Macmillan Publishers. n.d.
- "Do America's Military Bases Abroad Help or Hinder Global Security?". All Things Considered. NPR. August 23, 2015.
- Pineda, Dorany (March 2, 2021). "Isabel Wilkerson, Jacob Soboroff, Akwaeke Emezi among L.A. Times Book Prize finalists". Los Angeles Times.
- Ross, Jamie (September 8, 2020). "America's 'Horrifically Damaging' War on Terror Has Displaced at Least 37 Million People, Says Report". The Daily Beast.
- Saka, Rasheeda (March 2, 2021). "Here are the finalists for the 2020-21 L.A. Times Book Prize". Literary Hub.
- "The United States of War". University of California Press. n.d.
- "David Vine". UH Better Tomorrow Speaker Series, University of Hawaiʻi at Mānoa. n.d.
- "Political Anthropologist Vine '97 Speaks to Campus Community about Military Overseas under Trump". The Wesleyan Connection. Wesleyan University. November 27, 2017.
