= Fleet Command =

1999 video game

Jane's Fleet Command
- Developer: Sonalysts Combat Simulations
- Publisher: Electronic Arts
- Producer: Kim Castro
- Designers: Daniel Bowdler; Terry Jones; John Lackie; Ray Walsh; Jack Wayne
- Composer: Curt Ramm
- Series: Jane's Combat Simulations
- Platform: Microsoft Windows
- Release: NA: May 5, 1999; UK: May 28, 1999
- Genre: Real-time tactics
- Modes: Single-player, Multiplayer

Fleet Command, previously labelled as Jane's Fleet Command, is a real-time tactics naval warfare simulation computer game released in May 1999. It was developed by Sonalysts Inc. and published by Electronic Arts (EA). The game licensed parts of Jane's Information Group's military information database, which was used as an in-game "Jane's Library", reference material that the player could refer to while in-game. Jane's also licensed to EA the "Jane's" name and the "Jane's Combat Simulations" logo, and the game was marketed under the "Jane's" name, much like the previous "Jane's Fighters Anthology", also published by Electronic Arts.

== Gameplay ==
In terms of gameplay, as a real-time tactics game it is a realistic military simulator and only involves resource management of weapons and the fuel of airborne aircraft. The scenario defines the units that a player has at the beginning of the scenario, and the player can never have more than what they started with until the scenario ends. Like other real-time tactics games, losses cannot be replaced, which emphasises the value of units and the judicious use of them (though some scenarios make it impossible to save a particular unit). The military realism is emphasised further by such means as using some authentic NTDS symbology on the 2D tactical planning map. Much of the game and mission events are presented in the form of full-motion video sequences.

Main gameplay screen

Gameplay can be chosen from one of three different options. First is a series of preset missions that contain certain objectives. These missions contain specific goals that must be accomplished in order to be graded successfully. They vary in difficulty from one star to four with four stars being the most difficult. A second game play theme is to play one of four provided scenarios. These are generally "wars" verses "battles" that require the player to win each successive challenge before continuing. The last type of game play is using a feature called "mission editing", where a player can input their own configurations and force strength and objectives. Preset mission objectives and goals can be input into the editor and displayed to the player at various intervals throughout game play. Input objectives can be configured in such a way that they must be completed in predetermined orders for the overall mission to be successful. The programming skills necessary are quite basic and are a credit to the ingenuity of the software designers.

The "mission editor" feature is simple to use and relatively uncommon in other game play software. The feature enables players to interface directly with the software and provide a relatively limitless amount of possible combat scenarios.

== Setting ==
The game is set in the late 1990s. The game focused exclusively on contemporary units. Units that were in service when the game was released were featured, and units that were out of service or not yet in service were not featured. The game reflects that some of the world's military forces are more advanced than others.

== Realism ==
The game is a naval combat strategic training simulator. It covers the full spectrum of modern naval operations, including submarine warfare, surface warfare, naval aviation, and electronic warfare. Air Force, Marine Corps and Army units are also modelled in the game, although the Army units are generally static. Although the initial release focused mainly on the U.S. Military, it did include a wide variety of forces from nations around the world including the U.K., India, Russia, China, and others. The actual forces under a player's command can include units from several nations (a multi-national force), or it may be limited to a selection of forces from just the one nation's military Arsenal.

The game includes both aircraft carriers and land-based air bases. It maintains a level of realism in that aircraft that are limited to land-based operations in real life are similarly limited to land-based operations in the game. This prevents the player from having heavy bombers (like the B-52) taking off or landing from aircraft carriers, something that never happens in the real world. Moreover, only aircraft that are actually assigned to a particular class of aircraft carrier in real life are available on in-game carriers. This concept of realism in units carries through to the weaponry, ordnance, speed, accuracy, radar coverage, level of detection, and survivability of all of the units and weapons in the game. One feature that was deliberately kept out of the game was nuclear weapons.

== Game dynamics ==
In a single-player game, the player starts by selecting a stand-alone scenario or a campaign scenario. Campaign scenarios are linked in that if the player successfully completes a scenario in the campaign, this unlocks the next scenario in that campaign for play. However, the game is limited in that it can only ever have the one campaign available to the player at any one time. In fact, the original version of the game only included one campaign (since then, several replacement campaigns have been made by FC and NWP-FC enthusiasts). A stand-alone scenario is not linked to other scenarios like the campaign scenarios are, although they may be related in terms of setting, theater-of-war, combatants, alliances, fictitious or historical conflicts, etc.

Once the player is in the scenario, a 2-D representation of the forces available is presented. This display also shows a representation of the sensor (radar, visual, sonar, etc.) ranges that any of his units have. Individual units are shown in a 3D rendering. If the player has selected the EMCON option, none of his units start the game with active sensors on; only passive sensors will be engaged. This can be an effective strategy for keeping the player's ships undetected, but it also blinds their GCI and leaves them "groping in the dark", so to speak. If the player has AWACS aircraft and/or fighter jets available, these are often the first units deployed.

=== Release ===
The game was released the first time in 1999 by EA. EA licensed also from Jane's the "Jane's" name and the "Jane's Combat Simulations" logo, and the game was marketed under the "Jane's" name, much like the previous "Jane's Fighters Anthology", also published by EA.

On October 26, 2006 Strategy First re-released Fleet Command as SCS-Fleet Command, without the "Jane's" branding. It was released as part of a three-game retail package called Naval Combat Pack, which also included 688(I) Hunter/Killer and Sub Command and also includes a video CD A Century of Silent Service. The 2006 version of Fleet Command was also released on GameTap in March 20, 2008.

The November 2024 naval combat simulation Sea Power by MicroProse and Triassic Games is considered to be a spiritual successor to Fleet Command.

== Cast ==
Each campaign mission includes a pre-mission briefing cutscene describing the situation and available intelligence. The cast of these scenes includes:

- John Mahon as Admiral Julius Bennet, USN CINCPACFLT
- Patrick Kilpatrick as Captain Doug Matthews, USN command watch officer
- Mike White as Commander John Tomlin, USN operations officer
- Tembi Locke as Lieutenant Commander Jane Colter, USN intelligence officer
- Randy Goodwin as Petty Officer 1st Class Lawrence Ingram, USN operation specialist
- Randy Becker as Petty Officer 1st Class Michael Levine, USN operation specialist

== Reception ==
Reception

Aggregate score
Aggregator	Score
GameRankings	71%

Review scores
Publication	Score
AllGame	4/5
CNET Gamecenter	8/10
Computer Games Strategy Plus	4/5
Computer Gaming World	4/5
GameSpot	7.5/10
IGN	6.8/10
Next Generation	4/5
PC Accelerator	5/10
PC Gamer (US)	89%
PC Zone	58%

The game received above-average reviews according to the review aggregation website GameRankings. Next Generation gave generally positive reviews.

The United States Naval Academy had the game installed in computer labs and used it to introduce prospective students to the concepts of fleet level decision making during its Summer Seminar program.

The staff of PC Gamer US nominated the game for their 1999 "Best Wargame" award, which ultimately went to Close Combat III: The Russian Front. They called the game "the perfect modern naval game for thousands of PWSHFOHTPH ('People Who Still Haven't Figured Out How to Play Harpoon')".

== See also ==
- Command: Modern Air Naval Operations
