= U.S. Navy Fighters =

1994 video game

- Developer: Electronic Arts
- Publisher: Electronic Arts
- Designer: Brent Iverson
- Composers: George Sanger and Team Fat
- Platforms: DOS, PlayStation
- Release: DOS; November 19, 1994; PlayStation: JP: November 6, 1997
- Genre: Combat flight simulator
- Mode: Single-player

U.S. Navy Fighters is a combat flight simulation game developed and published in 1994 by Electronic Arts for DOS PCs. The game was programmed by Brent Iverson, who previously worked on EA's 1991 release Chuck Yeager's Air Combat. The U.S. Navy Fighters expansion pack Marine Fighters and a "Gold" compilation were both released in 1995. Later that year, Electronic Arts added graphical acceleration support for the game via the Nvidia NV1 when the chip was announced.

Electronic Arts would re-brand the game as the earliest entry in the Jane's Combat Simulations series, issuing an rebranded version in 1996 for Microsoft Windows with additional content and an updated title, Jane's U.S. Navy Fighters '97. The content from the base game, expansion, and reissue would be combined with Jane's Advanced Tactical Fighters into a unified interface for re-release in 1997 as Jane's Fighters Anthology. U.S. Navy Fighters received a Japan-exclusive PlayStation port courtesy of Electronic Arts Victor, released on November 6, 1997.

== Gameplay ==
The base game features a variety of 50 missions that can be played separately or as part of a campaign with full-motion video mission briefings. The campaign is set aboard the United States aircraft carrier "Ike" during a fictional 1997 war between Russia and Ukraine. The flyable jet fighters during the missions included the F-14B Tomcat, F-18D Hornet, A-7 Corsair, F-22 "Lightning II", and Sukhoi Su-33.

The Marine Fighters expansion added 35 new missions and a second campaign aboard the United States aircraft carrier "Wasp" during a fictional Russian-Japanese conflict over the Kuril Islands. It would feature three additional flyable fighters, the AV-8B Harrier II, FRS Mk 2 Sea Harrier, and Yak-141. The expansion's box art also touted faster frame rates, terrain masking, the addition of turbulence, and a "Tour of Duty" summary screen showing hit percentages, kills, and decorations.

The re-release Jane's U.S. Navy Fighters '97 added a historical campaign taking place in 1972 during the Vietnam War's Operation Linebacker. The contemporaneous planes F-4J Phantom II, F-8 Crusader, MiG-17 Fresco, and MiG-21 Fishbed were now available as flyable fighters. In addition, archival footage originally aired on ABC News was used for briefings, and aircraft technical references and photos were included from Janes Information Services.

== Jane's U.S. Navy Fighters '97 ==
Jane's U.S. Navy Fighters '97
- Developer: Electronic Arts
- Publisher: Electronic Arts
- Designer: Brent Iverson
- Programmer: Brent Iverson
- Artists: Brad Pollard; Nicholas Corea
- Writer: David Luoto
- Series: Jane's Combat Simulations
- Platform: Microsoft Windows
- Release: NA: November 5, 1996; JP: March 14, 1997
- Genre: Combat flight simulator
- Modes: Single player, Multiplayer

Jane's U.S. Navy Fighters '97 (USNF '97) is a 1996 update of the 1994 version with added planes, music, and two new campaigns. It's also ran on Win 95 version rather than DOS. The game contains three campaigns: Vietnam War-era, a fictional Russo-Ukrainian War, and a fictional Russo-Japanese conflict over the Kuril Islands. This version was released in Japan by Electronic Arts Victor on March 14, 1997. Another Japanese edition featuring exclusive missions was released on December 19, 1997 as U.S. Navy Fighters: Final Mission (U.S.ネイビーファイターズ ファイナルミッション).

== Reception ==
Reception

Review scores
Publication	Score
Computer Gaming World	4.5/5
Hyper	70%
Next Generation	4/5
PC Format	80%
PC Gamer (US)	82%
PC Games (DE)	72%
CD Player	8/10
PC Games (UK)	90%
PC Joker	83%
PC Player	86%
PC Zone	92%
Play Time	82%
Power Play	84%
Score	89%

Next Generation gave U.S. Navy Fighters four stars out of five, and stated that "despite heavy system requirements, this is a must for every flight freak".

It appeared at number 20 of PC Data's best-seller list for February 1997.
