= Seapower =

Seapower or sea power may refer to:

- Command of the sea
- Naval warfare
- Ocean thermal energy conversion
- Seapower (magazine), publication of the Navy League of the United States
- Sea Power, an English alternative rock band, formerly British Sea Power
- Sea Power: Naval Combat in the Missile Age, video game
- Tidal stream generator
