= Jane's ATF: Advanced Tactical Fighters =

1996 video game

- Developer: Electronic Arts
- Publisher: Electronic Arts
- Designers: Andre Gagnon and Brent Iverson
- Composers: George Sanger and Team Fat
- Series: Jane's Combat Simulations
- Platforms: DOS, Windows
- Release: April 1, 1996 (DOS); April 2, 1997 (Windows)
- Genre: Combat flight simulator
- Modes: Single-player, Multiplayer

Jane's ATF: Advanced Tactical Fighters is a 1996 combat flight simulator developed and published by Electronic Arts for DOS. It is the first entry in the Jane's Combat Simulations franchise. An expansion pack, NATO Fighters, was released in 1996, and a compilation package for Microsoft Windows was released in 1997 titled Advanced Tactical Fighters Gold.

Content from the game would be combined into a unified interface with Jane's US Navy Fighters 97 for re-release as Jane's Fighters Anthology in 1997.

== Gameplay ==
Jane's ATF uses the same engine and menus as the 1994 game U.S. Navy Fighters, with updated aircraft and terrain geometry. The base game includes two campaigns, one set in Egypt in 1998 and the other Russia in 2002, as well as single missions, a mission creator, and multiplayer functionality.

The game's flyable planes lean heavily on aircraft that were new or still under development at the time of the game's release, including the F-117 Nighthawk (Stealth Fighter), F-22 Raptor, X-29 FSW, XF-31 EFM, X-32 ASTOVL, B-2 Spirit, and Rafale C.

The NATO Fighters expansion adds a campaign in the Baltic and four new planes: F-16 Fighting Falcon, Saab Gripen, EuroFighter 2000, and Su-35.

== Reception ==
Reception

Review scores
Publication	Score
Computer Gaming World	4/5
GameSpot	7.7/10
Next Generation	4/5
PC Gamer (US)	90%
PC Games	B

In Computer Gaming World, Denny Atkin praised the game and its features, but complained for lacking multiplayer mode. Steve Wartofsky called ATF an "evolutionary rather than revolutionary step" for Jane's Combat Simulations, but argued that it set the standard for its genre. While he found its graphics to be a "mixed bag", he enjoyed the game overall, and highlighted its encyclopedia as its best feature.

Writing for PC Gamer US, Dan Bennett called ATF as a solid, good-looking sim, but found the game to be overly difficult.

Next Generation reviewed the PC version of the game positively and recommended it for flight sim fans.

In 1996, the editors of Computer Gaming World nominated ATF for their "Simulation of the Year" award, which ultimately went to EF2000. They wrote that ATF "makes up for its aging engine by providing the best multiplayer environment of any modern sim". It was also a nominee for the Computer Game Developers Conference's 1996 "Best Simulation Game" Spotlight Award, but lost the prize to MechWarrior 2: Mercenaries.

The expansion, NATO Fighters, received 7.8 out of 10 from T. Liam McDonald of GameSpot who called it "[...] a must, as it expands considerably on the original program and doubles its play life."
