= Sea Power: Naval Combat in the Missile Age =

- Developer: Triassic Games
- Publisher: MicroProse
- Engine: Unity
- Platform: Windows
- Release: November 12, 2024 (early access)
- Genres: Real-time tactics, Simulation video game
- Mode: Single-player

Sea Power: Naval Combat in the Missile Age or Sea Power is a tactical simulation video game developed by Triassic Games and published by MicroProse on November 12, 2024. The game allows players to command various air, land, and sea units in historical and hypothetical engagements set during the Cold War.

== Development ==
Work began in 2018, with developer Triassic Games intending to have a full release. However, feature creep and an overly-optimistic plan lead them to release the game as early access. The game was the debut title of the studio, which was overseen by the lead designer of Cold Waters.

In 2020, MicroProse announced it would publish the game. While the company had closed in the early 2000s, it was revived in 2019. Sea Power was one of the first games announced by the rebooted MicroProse as part of a lineup of new military strategy games.

== Gameplay ==
Screenshot depicting an F-14 overflying an American carrier strike group.

The game focuses on naval combat during the 1960s, 1970s, and 1980s, primarily between NATO and Warsaw Pact forces after the Cold War became a conventional war. Anti-submarine, aerial, and subsurface warfare is also simulated along with historic conflicts. The game features more than 200 units that depict various kinds of warships, transports, submarines, helicopters, aircraft, land units, and civilian traffic. Included are several-never built units, such as the Project 1153 Orel aircraft carrier. Players can give orders to fleets or directly control a unit, such as by selecting targets or activating a sensor. Included is a scenario creator for custom missions and an in-game encyclopedia that contains information about each unit and weapon. Missions are stand-alone or organized into campaigns; one campaign focuses on a fictional Soviet "Strike Group Molniya" and includes persistence between missions to keep track of damaged ships and remaining ammunition. Another campaign, titled "Pacific Strike '85", allows players to develop and manage a NATO-aligned task force that fights a war in the Western Pacific.

According to the developers, the gameplay style is inspired by Janes's Fleet Command and Strike Fleet, with the game described as a spiritual successor to the former. A significant element of gameplay is overcoming fog of war by using various sensors to identify and locate the enemy's units without attacking neutral civilians or exposing the player's units. While missions vary, combat can occur over large regions and multiple in-game days, with the player having the ability to compress time. In addition to a 3D game world, the player can process information using a 2D map.

== Reception ==
Sea Power had an early access release on 12 November 2024, and was one of the best selling games on Steam that month. The UK Defence Journal praised the game for being immersive and including small details, such as helicopters leaving hangars and being prepared for launch. The Center for International Maritime Security described the game as being a useful wargaming tool that could keep the attention of midshipmen. In May 2026, 90% of Steam reviewers were positive.
