= LHX Attack Chopper =

1990 video game

- MS-DOS cover art
- Developer(s): Electronic Arts
- Publisher(s): Electronic Arts
- Designer(s): Brent Iverson
- Platform(s): MS-DOS, Mega Drive/Genesis
- Release: 1990 (DOS); 1992 (Mega Drive/Genesis)
- Genre(s): Combat flight simulation
- Mode(s): Single-player

LHX Attack Chopper is a combat helicopter simulation game published by Electronic Arts in 1990. Development was led by Brent Iverson, who later designed Chuck Yeager's Air Combat. The game was released for MS-DOS and ported to the Mega Drive/Genesis. LHX is acronym from Light Helicopter Experimental.

== Gameplay ==
In addition to the LHX prototype scout-attack helicopter, the game includes two flyable US Army helicopters – the AH-64A Apache and UH-60 Blackhawk – and (as of 1990) a prototype MV-22 Osprey (which can actually switch between helicopter and airplane control modes), any of which may be deployed against Soviet-made ground and air military equipment in the three war theaters of Libya, Vietnam and Germany. Allied units are also available, but they do not actively join the fight, nor do the opposing units usually fire upon allied equipment, apart from specific escort missions where a B-2 bomber or a couple of UH-60 helicopters tasked with CSAR will enter into enemy air space. All missile-equipped units (both ground and air) have a limited number of shots, often matching the number of ready-to-fire missiles available in the real system. Land units do not move, but air units do.

The game interface for the LHX aircraft

The player can play any campaign or mission in any preferred order, facing five different complexity levels, which will improve the enemy's situation awareness, time of reaction and sheer number and quality of the fielded forces. Every completed mission will not affect the other missions or the campaign as a whole, and the player can run the same mission again regardless of its previous result. At the end of every mission, the player receives a mission debriefing describing the consequences of the success or failure, and a point counter will change depending on whether the primary target is completed, whether the pilot landed at an allied airfield and not just in friendly territory, and to a smaller extent on the number of other enemy forces destroyed in the process of reaching and returning from the target area.

At the debriefing, given the mission outcome, the pilot may receive different medals or a promotion up to colonel rank. In case the player's helicopter exploded mid-air or crashed, the pilot will die, and the player career will end. If landing in enemy territory, different outcomes are available, with the pilot being captured, killed, escaped to friendly territory, or rescued by friendly forces.

== Reception ==
A 1992 Computer Gaming World survey of wargames with modern settings gave the game two and a half stars out of five, stating that it had a "highly unrealistic flight model". A 1994 survey gave it two stars, stating that "it enjoyed more popular success than I thought it deserved".

In 1994, PC Gamer US named LHX Attack Chopper the 29th best computer game ever. The editors wrote that "what the game lacks in graphic polish it more than makes up for with fast action".
