= 1997 in video games =

1997 saw many sequels and prequels in video games, such as Final Fantasy VII, Castlevania: Symphony of the Night, GoldenEye 007, Star Fox 64, Crash Bandicoot 2: Cortex Strikes Back, Quake II, Mega Man Legends, Riven, Tomb Raider II, Dark Rift, Tekken 3 and Virtua Striker 2, along with new games such as Oddworld: Abe's Oddysee, Gran Turismo, Diablo, Grand Theft Auto, Fallout, and Postal.

Sony's PlayStation was the year's best-selling video game console worldwide for the second year in a row, while also being the annual best-selling console in Japan for the first time (overtaking the Game Boy and Sega Saturn). The year's best-selling home video game worldwide was Squaresoft's Final Fantasy VII for the PlayStation, while the year's highest-grossing arcade games in Japan were Sega's Virtua Fighter 3 and Print Club 2.

== Legend ==
Video game platforms
Arcade	Arcade video game	DOS	PC DOS / MS-DOS, Windows 3.X	GB	Game Boy
N64	Nintendo 64, iQue Player	NEO	Neo Geo AES	NEOCD	Neo Geo CD
NES	Nintendo Entertainment System / Famicom	PCFX	PC-FX	PS1	PlayStation 1
SAT	Sega Saturn	SNES	Super NES / Super Famicom / Super Comboy	WIN	Windows, all versions Windows 95 and up

Video game genres
Action	Action game	Action-adventure	Action-adventure game	Fighting	Fighting game
FPS	First-person shooter	Platformer	Platformer	Puzzle	Puzzle video game
Racing	Racing video game	Rhythm	Rhythm game	Roguelike	Roguelike, Roguelite
RPG	Role-playing video game	RTS	Real-time strategy	Shooter	Shooter game
Simulation	Simulation video game	Sports	Sports video game	Tactical RPG	Tactical role-playing game
Virtual pet	Virtual pet				

== Hardware ==
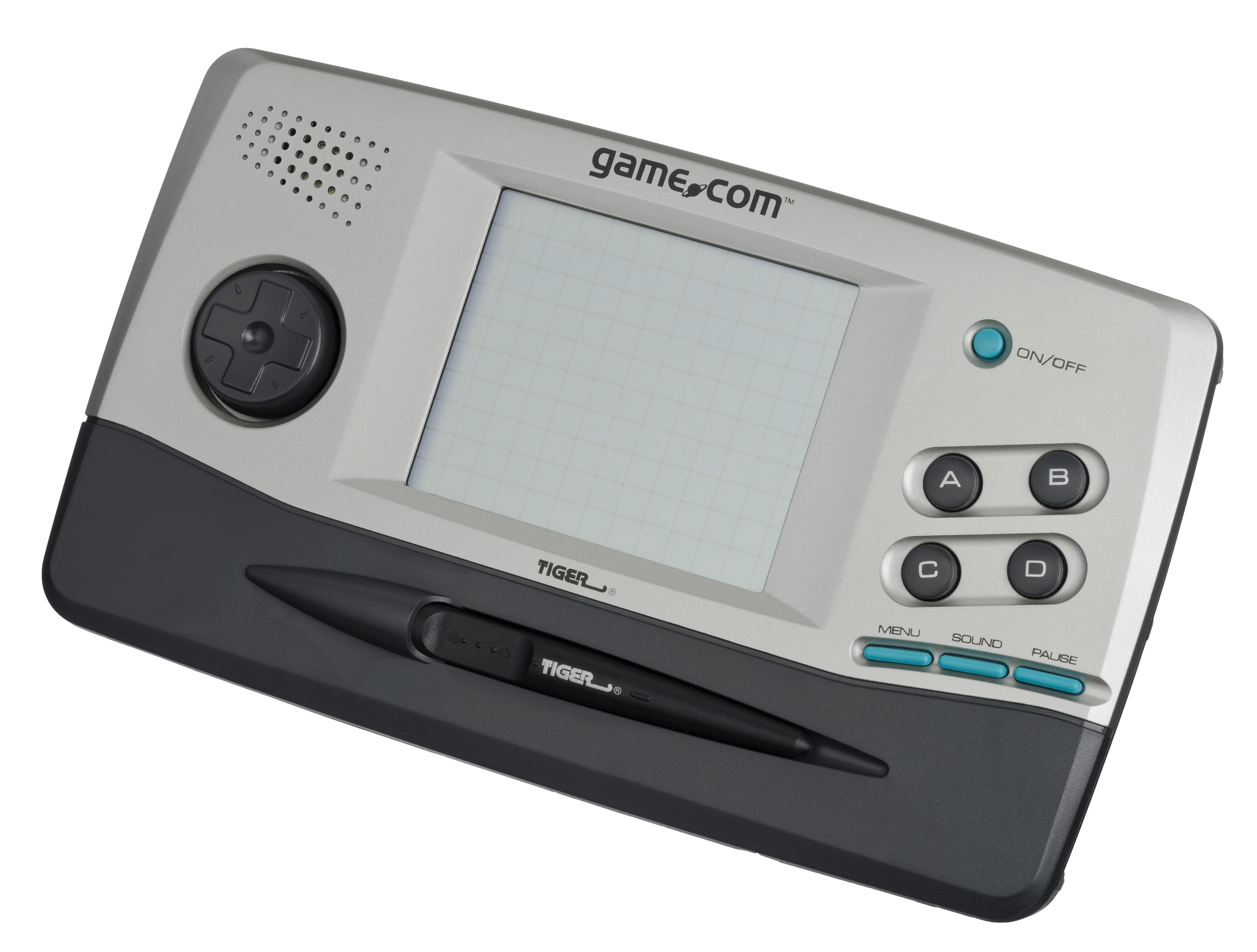
Game.com

Date	System	Ref
March 1	Nintendo 64^{EU/AU}	
April 25	Dual Analog Controller^{JP}	
September 12	Game.com^{NA}	
October 20	New-style Super NES^{NA}	
November 20	DualShock controller^{JP}	

=== Discontinued ===
Date	System
April 30	Game Gear
Unknown	Genesis/Mega Drive

== Top-rated games ==
=== Game of the Year awards ===
The following titles won Game of the Year awards for 1997.

Awards	Game of the Year	Platform(s)	Genre	Publisher	Ref
CESA Awards	Final Fantasy VII	PS1	RPG	Squaresoft	
Japan Media Arts Festival	Final Fantasy VII	PS1	RPG	Squaresoft	
Electronic Gaming Monthly (EGM)	Final Fantasy VII	PS1	RPG	Sony	
Game Informer	Final Fantasy VII	PS1	RPG	Sony	
GamePro	Final Fantasy VII	PS1	RPG	Sony	
Hyper	Final Fantasy VII	PS1	RPG	Sony	
Origins Awards	Final Fantasy VII	PS1	RPG	Sony	
Electronic Gaming Monthly (EGM)	GoldenEye 007	N64	FPS	Nintendo	
Interactive Achievement Awards	GoldenEye 007	N64	FPS	Nintendo	
VideoGame Advisor	GoldenEye 007	N64	FPS	Nintendo	
Electronic Playground	GoldenEye 007	N64	FPS	Nintendo	
GamePro	GoldenEye 007	N64	FPS	Nintendo	
Nintendo Power	GoldenEye 007	N64	FPS	Nintendo	
Digitiser	Super Mario 64	N64	Platformer	Nintendo	
Golden Joystick Awards	Super Mario 64	N64	Platformer	Nintendo	
Computer Gaming World Premier Awards	Diablo (Note: Though usually considered a 1997 release, Computer Gaming World extended its eligibility to games released early in the following calendar year, allowing Diablo to win the award for games released in 1996. Star Wars Jedi Knight: Dark Forces II won the next year's award for games released in 1997.)	WIN / DOS	Action RPG	Blizzard	
Computer Gaming World Premier Awards	Star Wars Jedi Knight: Dark Forces II	WIN / DOS	FPS	LucasArts	
GameSpot	Total Annihilation	WIN / DOS	RTS	Cavedog	
Gamest Awards	Vampire Savior (Darkstalkers 3)	Arcade	Fighting	Capcom	
Japan Media Arts Festival	Intelligent Qube (I.Q. / Kurushi)	PS1	Puzzle	Sony	
Origins Awards	Sid Meier's Gettysburg!	WIN / DOS	Wargame	Electronic Arts	
Origins Awards	Tomb Raider		Action-adventure	Eidos Interactive	

=== Critically acclaimed titles ===
==== Metacritic and GameRankings ====
Metacritic (MC) and GameRankings (GR) are online aggregators of video game journalism reviews. Note that their coverage of print magazines at the time was limited, with numerous print magazines not listed on their sites.

1997 games and expansions scoring at least 88/100 (MC) or 87.5% (GR)
Game	Publisher	Release Date	Platform(s)	MC score	GR score
Gran Turismo	Sony Computer Entertainment	December 23, 1997	PS1	96/100	94.95%
GoldenEye 007	Nintendo	August 25, 1997	N64	96/100	94.7%
Castlevania: Symphony of the Night	Konami	March 20, 1997	PS1	93/100	93.03%
Final Fantasy VII	Square	January 31, 1997	PS1	92/100	92.35%
Dungeon Keeper	Electronic Arts	June 26, 1997	WIN / DOS	—N/a	92.2%
Diablo	Blizzard Entertainment	January 3, 1997	WIN / DOS	94/100	89.07%
Colony Wars	Psygnosis	October 31, 1997	PS1	91/100	92.09%
Sid Meier's Gettysburg!	Electronic Arts	October 14, 1997	WIN / DOS	92/100	91%
Star Wars Jedi Knight: Dark Forces II	LucasArts	October 10, 1997	WIN / DOS	91/100	88.69%
Myth: The Fallen Lords	Bungie	November 7, 1997	WIN / DOS	91/100	80.8%
Blast Corps	Nintendo	March 21, 1997	N64	90/100	88.87%
NFL GameDay 98	Sony Computer Entertainment	September 4, 1997	PS1	—N/a	90%
Fallout	Interplay Productions	October 10, 1997	WIN / DOS	89/100	89.69%
Carmageddon	Sales Curve Interactive	June 13, 1997	WIN / DOS	—N/a	89.6%
Formula 1 97	Psygnosis	September 26, 1997	PS1	—N/a	89.43%
MDK	Playmates Interactive	May 5, 1997	WIN / DOS	—N/a	89.2%
Star Fox 64	Nintendo	April 27, 1997	N64	88/100	89.01%
The Curse of Monkey Island	LucasArts	November 1, 1997	WIN / DOS	89/100	89%
Einhänder	Square	November 20, 1997	PS1	89/100	85%
Total Annihilation	GT Interactive	September 26, 1997	WIN / DOS	86/100	88.85%
Diddy Kong Racing	Rare	November 21, 1997	N64	88/100	88.65%
Crash Bandicoot 2: Cortex Strikes Back	Sony Computer Entertainment	October 31, 1997	PS1	—N/a	88.54%
Oddworld: Abe's Oddysee	GT Interactive	September 18, 1997	PS1	85/100	87.94%
Madden NFL 98	EA Sports	August 26, 1997	SAT	—N/a	87.90%

==== Famitsu Platinum Hall of Fame ====
The following video game releases in 1997 entered Famitsu magazine's "Platinum Hall of Fame" for receiving Famitsu scores of at least 35 out of 40.

Title	Platform	Developer	Publisher	Genre	Score (out of 40)
Final Fantasy VII	PS1	Squaresoft	Squaresoft	RPG	38
Final Fantasy VII International	PS1	Squaresoft	Squaresoft	RPG	37
Tobal 2	PS1	DreamFactory	Squaresoft	Fighting	36
Star Fox 64	N64	Nintendo EAD	Nintendo	Rail shooter	36
Derby Stallion	PS1	ASCII Corporation	ASCII Corporation	Simulation	35
Gran Turismo	PS1	Polys Entertainment	Sony	Racing (sim)	35

== Financial performance ==
=== Highest-grossing arcade games in Japan ===
In Japan, the following titles were the highest-grossing arcade games of 1997.

Rank	Gamest			Game Machine			
Rank	Title	Manufacturer	Genre	Title	Manufacturer	Type	Points
1	Virtua Fighter 3	Sega	Fighting	Print Club 2	Atlus	Other	4068
2	Tekken 3	Namco	Fighting	Virtua Fighter 3	Sega	Dedicated	3995
3	X-Men vs. Street Fighter	Capcom	Fighting	Tekken 3	Namco	PCB	3757
4	Street Fighter III: New Generation	Capcom	Fighting	Virtual On: Cyber Troopers	Sega	Dedicated	2969
5	Vampire Savior (Darkstalkers 3)	Capcom	Fighting	X-Men vs. Street Fighter	Capcom	PCB	2776
6	Samurai Spirits 4: Amakusa Kōrin	SNK	Fighting	Puzzle Bobble 3	Taito	PCB	2626
7	Real Bout Garō Densetsu Special	SNK	Fighting	Densha de Go!	Taito	Dedicated	2614
8	Virtual On: Cyber Troopers	Sega	Shooter	Time Crisis	Namco	Dedicated	2459
9	The King of Fighters '97	SNK	Fighting	Gallop Racer	Tecmo	PCB	2420
10	DoDonPachi	Atlus	Bullet hell	Rave Racer	Namco	Dedicated	2399

=== Best-selling video game consoles ===
Rank	Manufacturer	Game console	Type	Generation	Sales		
Rank	Manufacturer	Game console	Type	Generation	Japan	United States	Worldwide
1	Sony	PS1	Home	32-bit	5,050,000+	6,750,000+	17,200,000+
2	Nintendo	GB	Handheld	8-bit	4,220,000	Unknown	10,370,000
3	Nintendo	N64	Home	64-bit	1,110,000	4,488,000	9,420,000
4	Nintendo	SNES	Home	16-bit	190,000	593,000	2,040,000
5	Sega	SAT	Home	32-bit	800,000	249,000	1,800,000
6	Sega	GEN	Home	16-bit	Unknown	478,000	478,000+
7	Nintendo	NES	Home	8-bit	30,000	81,000	111,000
8	NEC	PCFX	Home	32-bit	30,000	—N/a	30,000

=== Best-selling home video games ===
Final Fantasy VII was the best-selling home video game worldwide in 1997. It sold more than 6 million copies worldwide by 1998, becoming the best-selling PlayStation game up until then.

The following titles were the top ten best-selling home video games (console games or computer games) of 1997 in Japan and the United States.

Rank	Title	Platform	Sales		
Rank	Title	Platform	Japan	United States	Combined
1	Final Fantasy VII	PS1	3,447,500+	1,500,000+	4,947,500+
2	Pocket Monsters: Red / Green / Blue	GB	3,995,988	—N/a	3,995,988
3	Mario Kart 64	N64	731,385	1,000,000+	1,731,385+
4	Derby Stallion	PS1	1,581,138	—N/a	1,581,138
5	Star Fox 64	N64	373,479	1,000,000+	1,373,479+
6	Super Mario 64	N64	361,302	1,000,000+	1,361,302+
7	Minna no Golf (Everybody's Golf)	PS1	1,327,000	—N/a	1,327,000
8	Final Fantasy Tactics	PS1	1,239,000	—N/a	1,239,000
9	Diddy Kong Racing	N64	217,259	1,000,000+	1,217,259+
10	SaGa Frontier	PS1	1,057,263	—N/a	1,057,263

==== United States ====
In the United States, the following titles were the top ten best-selling home video games of 1997.

Rank	Title	Platform	Developer	Publisher	Genre	Sales
1	Mario Kart 64	N64	Nintendo EAD	Nintendo	Racing (kart)	1,000,000+
2	Star Fox 64	N64	Nintendo EAD	Nintendo	Rail shooter	1,000,000+
3	Super Mario 64	N64	Nintendo EAD	Nintendo	Platformer	1,000,000+
4	Diddy Kong Racing	N64	Rare	Rare	Racing (kart)	1,000,000+
5	GoldenEye 007	N64	Rare	Nintendo	FPS	1,000,000+
6	Final Fantasy VII	PS1	Squaresoft	Sony	RPG	1,500,000+
7	NFL GameDay 98	PS1	Sony Interactive	Sony	Sports (football)	Unknown
8	Star Wars: Shadows of the Empire	N64	LucasArts	Nintendo	Action	Unknown
9	Madden NFL 98	PS1	Tiburon Entertainment	EA Sports	Sports (football)	Unknown
10	Crash Bandicoot	PS1	Naughty Dog	Sony	Platformer	Unknown

==== Japan ====
In Japan, the following titles were the top ten best-selling home video games of 1997.

Rank	Title	Platform	Developer	Publisher	Genre	Sales	Ref
1	Pocket Monsters: Red / Green / Blue	GB	Game Freak	Nintendo	RPG	3,995,988	
2	Final Fantasy VII	PS1	Squaresoft	Squaresoft	RPG	3,447,500+	
3	Derby Stallion	PS1	ASCII	ASCII	Simulation	1,581,138	
4	Minna no Golf (Everybody's Golf)	PS1	Camelot Software Planning	Sony	Sports (golf)	1,327,000	
5	Final Fantasy Tactics	PS1	Squaresoft	Squaresoft	Tactical RPG	1,239,000	
6	SaGa Frontier	PS1	Squaresoft	Squaresoft	RPG	1,057,263	
7	Gran Turismo	PS1	Polys Entertainment	Sony	Racing (sim)	905,000	
8	Game de Hakken!! Tamagotchi	GB	Tom Create	Bandai	Virtual pet	808,000	
9	Chocobo no Fushigi na Dungeon	PS1	Squaresoft	Squaresoft	Roguelike	801,000	
10	PaRappa the Rapper	PS1	NanaOn-Sha	Sony	Rhythm	761,621	

==== United Kingdom ====
In the United Kingdom, the following titles were the top-selling home video games of each month in 1997.

Month(s)	Title	Platform
January	Die Hard Trilogy	PS1
February	Cool Boarders	PS1
March	Super Mario 64	N64
April	Wave Race 64	N64
April	Micro Machines V3	PS1
May	Soul Blade	PS1
June	Mario Kart 64	N64
July	International Superstar Soccer 64	N64
August	V-Rally	PS1
September	V-Rally	PS1
October	Formula 1 97	PS1
October	Lylat Wars	N64
November	Final Fantasy VII	PS1
December	FIFA: Road to World Cup 98	PS1, WIN / DOS

== Events ==
- March 6 - Sega opens Sega World Sydney in Australia. It is the second Sega World park to open outside of Japan, with the first opening as part of the London Trocadero the previous year.
- June 19–21 – The 3rd annual E3 is held in Atlanta, Georgia, United States.
- October:
  - Video game retailer FuncoLand opens its first Greater Cincinnati locations.
  - 4 – Gunpei Yokoi (1941–1997) dies after a double car accident.
- November – Interactive Entertainment Merchants Association (IEMA) launched.
- December 16 – A scene from the Pokémon anime (based upon the highly successful games) causes 685 Japanese children to have seizures. Nintendo makes a statement proclaiming the safety of the Pokémon games from fear that the games would cause a similar effect, the episode to be permanently removed from circulation, and the featured Pokémon in the episode (Porygon) has not made an appearance in the Pokémon anime since.
- TSR, Inc., the owner of the Dungeons & Dragons tabletop role-playing game, was acquired by Wizards of the Coast.
- 3D Realms begins production of Duke Nukem Forever, winner of numerous vaporware awards.
- The gaming portal Cool Math Games went online for the first time.
- Sony releases PlayStation development software for IBM compatible PCs

=== Business ===
- April 7 – Warthog Limited founded
- April 15 – Irem Software Engineering Inc. founded
- May 5 – Irrational Games LLC founded
- June 4 – Electronic Arts Inc. acquires American video game developer Maxis
- August 7 – Activision acquires American video game developer Raven Software
- August 14 – Intermetrics. Inc and Looking Glass Studios announce the merger of their gaming operations to form Intermetrics/Looking Glass Studios, LLC. which was renamed to Intermetrics Entertainment Software, LLC on September 17
- August 28 – Human Head Studios, Inc. formed
- September 19 – 4HEAD Studios created
- November 21 – Conspiracy Entertainment Corporation founded
- December 2 – Activision acquires British software distributor CentreSoft Ltd.
- December 3 – GameTek files for Chapter 11 bankruptcy and closes its doors in July 1998
- 2015 founded
- 4D Rulers Software, Inc. founded; the company was legally incorporated on January 29, 1998
- Bungie West formed by Bungie
- Crave Entertainment, Inc. formed
- Illusion Softworks, a.s. founded
- Mythic Entertainment renames itself from Interworld Productions after name dispute with another "Interworld" company
- THQ renamed from Toy Headquarters, Inc.

== Lawsuits ==
- Nintendo vs Games City: Nintendo sues Games City for selling the Game Doctor and Doctor V64 backup devices for the SNES and N64 consoles. Nintendo wins the suit.
- Nintendo vs Prima Publishing: Nintendo sues Prima over copyrights to maps of the N64 video game GoldenEye 007. Nintendo loses the suit.
- Nintendo vs Sony Video Games: Nintendo sues Sony over copyrights about Mario games.

== Notable releases in 1997 ==
Release Date	Title	Platform	Ref
January 3	Diablo	WIN / DOS	
January 14	Tengai Makyō: Daiyon no Mokushiroku	SAT	
January 31	Final Fantasy VII	PS1	
February 5	DoDonPachi	SAT, Arcade	
February 14	Daina Airan	SAT	
February 27	The Lost Vikings 2	WIN / DOS, SNES, PS1, SAT	
February 28	Blast Corps	N64	
February 28	Independence Day	WIN / DOS, PS1, SAT	
February 28	Mega Man 8	PS1, SAT	
February 28	Turok: Dinosaur Hunter	WIN / DOS, N64	
February 28	Interstate '76	WIN / DOS	
March 20	Castlevania: Symphony of the Night	PS1	
March 20	Tekken 3	Arcade	
March 24	Realms of the Haunting (NA)	WIN / DOS	
March 26	Vandal Hearts	PS1, SAT	
March 28	Darklight Conflict	DOS, PS1, SAT	
March 30	The Last Express	WIN / DOS	
March 31	Need for Speed II	WIN / DOS, PS1	
April 7	Outlaws	WIN / DOS	
April 7	Redneck Rampage	WIN / DOS	
April 30	Fighters Megamix	SAT	
April 30	Star Wars: X-Wing vs. TIE Fighter	WIN / DOS	
May 21	Blood	WIN / DOS	
May 31	MDK	WIN / DOS	
June 10	Ecstatica II	WIN / DOS	
June 17	Harvest Moon	SNES	
June 20	Sonic Jam	SAT	
June 20	Final Fantasy Tactics	PS1	
June 26	Dungeon Keeper	WIN / DOS	
June 27	Tamagotchi	GB	
June 30	Star Fox 64	N64	
July 4	Jane's 688(I) Hunter/Killer	WIN / DOS	
July 28	The King of Fighters '97	NEO, NEOCD, Arcade	
July 30	Carmageddon	WIN / DOS	
July 31	Herc's Adventures	PS1, SAT	
July 31	Warlords III: Reign of Heroes	WIN / DOS	
August 1	Mega Man X4	PS1, SAT	
August 11	Tetrisphere	N64	
August 25	GoldenEye 007	N64	
August 25	Shadow Warrior	WIN / DOS	
August 26	Madden NFL 98	WIN / DOS, PS1, SAT	
August 31	Imperialism	WIN / DOS	
September 9	Star Wars: Shadows of the Empire	WIN / DOS	
September 10	Silhouette Mirage	SAT	
September 11	Breath of Fire III	PS1	
September 11	Hexen II	WIN / DOS	
September 16	The Lost World: Jurassic Park	GEN	
September 17	Resident Evil	WIN / DOS	
September 18	Street Fighter Collection	SAT, PS1	
September 19	Oddworld: Abe's Oddysee	WIN / DOS, PS1	
September 24	Ultima Online	WIN / DOS	
September 24	Postal	WIN / DOS	
September 26	Bomberman 64	N64	
September 26	LEGO Island	WIN / DOS	
September 29	Croc: Legend of the Gobbos	WIN / DOS, PS1, SAT	
September 30	Close Combat: A Bridge Too Far	WIN / DOS	
September 30	Fallout	WIN / DOS	
September 30	Panzer General II	WIN / DOS	
September 30	Poy Poy	PS1	
September 30	Total Annihilation	WIN / DOS	
October	Combat Chess	WIN / DOS	
October 9	Star Wars Jedi Knight: Dark Forces II	WIN / DOS	
October 15	Age of Empires	WIN / DOS	
October 15	Mortal Kombat 4	N64, Arcade	
October 23	Steep Slope Sliders	SAT	
October 28	Shipwreckers	WIN / DOS, PS1	
October 29	Riven	WIN / DOS, SAT, PS1	
October 30	Culdcept	SAT	
October 31	The Curse of Monkey Island	WIN / DOS	
October 31	Zork: Grand Inquisitor	WIN / DOS	
November	Independence War	WIN / DOS	
November 1	Shock Troopers	NEO, Arcade	
November 4	Colony Wars	PS1	
November 6	Crash Bandicoot 2: Cortex Strikes Back	PS1	
November 14	Blade Runner	WIN / DOS	
November 17	Sonic R	SAT	
November 18	Tomb Raider II	WIN / DOS, PS1	
November 21	Diddy Kong Racing	N64	
November 21	Worms 2	WIN / DOS	
November 25	Myth: The Fallen Lords	WIN / DOS	
November 27	Kirby's Dream Land 3	SNES	
November 27	Grand Theft Auto	WIN / DOS, PS1	
November 30	FIFA: Road to World Cup 98	WIN / DOS, N64, PS1, SAT	
November 30	One	PS1	
November 30	Wing Commander: Prophecy	WIN / DOS	
November 30	WCW vs. nWo: World Tour	N64	
December	Puzzle Bobble 4	Arcade	
December 6	Quake II	WIN / DOS, PS1	
December 11	Klonoa: Door to Phantomile	PS1	
December 18	Grandia	SAT	
December 18	Mega Man Legends	PS1	
December 21	Yoshi's Story	N64	
December 23	Auto Destruct	PS1	
December 23	Gran Turismo	PS1	
December 31	Mortal Kombat Mythologies: Sub-Zero	N64	
Unknown	7 Wonders	WIN	

== See also ==
- 1997 in games
