= Brent Iverson =

American video game designer

- Education: University of Michigan
- Years active: 1986–present
- Employer: Electronic Arts
- Notable work: LHX Attack Chopper; Chuck Yeager's Air Combat; Jane's US Navy Fighters

Brent "Buzzboy" Iverson is a programmer best known as a simulations game developer. Among his credits are the PC DOS version of Chuck Yeager's Air Combat, LHX Attack Chopper, and Jane's U.S. Navy Fighters, all published by Electronic Arts.

== Background ==
Iverson's experience with computers began at the age of fifteen when he went to a friend's house to play games on an Apple II. He liked working on computers but still planned to major in Art in college. However, after beginning his studies at the University of Michigan he learned that even talented artists rarely make a good living with their art, but that computer programmers make more money as a general rule. As a result, he majored in computer science.

== Career ==
Iverson has worked at Electronic Arts (EA) since 1986, he is now the Chief Technical Officer and Senior Director of Development of Electronic Arts' Redwood Shores studio. In November 2005 he participated on a panel of industry tech experts at an International Game Developers Association panel. During that panel discussion, Iverson expressed his opinion of developing games within the limitations of marketing concerns:

"I think that technology and code you're given, design decisions you're given... aren't really limiters; they're actually enablers. If someone said, 'Make a great game,' and that's all the instructions you had, it would be pretty darn difficult to get started. But if somebody said, 'Make a great game about this movie that's coming out, or about dinosaurs, or pirates, that's a turn-based strategy game,' now all of a sudden you've got a lot of stuff that's laid out for you, and you don't have to think about those things anymore. Now you can say, 'How can I innovate in that space?' "I think technology a lot of times has that same effect.... Now you can stop worrying about that stuff and you can say, 'Well, what do I do that's really interesting to the customer on top of that framework?'"

== Development credits ==
- MySims Kingdom (EA, 2008)
- Boom Blox (EA, 2008)
- MySims (EA, 2007)
- The Godfather: The Game (EA, 2006)
- 007: Everything or Nothing (EA, 2004)
- The Sims (EA, 2003)
- 007: Nightfire (EA, 2002)
- Combat Medic: Special Ops (LI, 2002)
- Freekstyle (EA, 2002)
- Rumble Racing (EA, 2001)
- Sub Command (EA, 2001)
- Tiger Woods PGA Tour 2001 (EA, 2001)
- Jane's Combat Simulations: WWII Fighters (EA, 1998)
- Jane's Combat Simulations: U.S. Navy Fighters '97 (EA, 1997)
- Marine Fighters (EA, 1995)
- U.S. Navy Fighters (EA, 1994)
- Bulls vs Blazers and the NBA Playoffs (EA, 1992)
- Chuck Yeager's Air Combat (EA, 1991)
- PGA Tour Golf (EA, 1991)
- LHX Attack Chopper (EA, 1990)
- SU-25 Stormovik (EA, 1990)

Iverson also wrote the MS-DOS and Apple IIGS versions of Deluxe Paint, a program originally written for the Amiga by Dan Silva.
