= Jane's IAF: Israeli Air Force =

1998 video game

- Developer: Pixel Multimedia
- Publisher: Electronic Arts
- Directors: Ramy Weitz; David Zerah
- Producer: David Zerah
- Designer: Aviv Yam-Shahor
- Programmers: Benny Karov; Tal Raviv; Ady Shimony; Shai Almog
- Artists: Edo Segal; Hila Peled
- Composers: Danny Aharonson; Assaf Gavron; Ishai Adar
- Series: Jane's Combat Simulations
- Platform: Microsoft Windows
- Release: September 10, 1998
- Genre: Combat flight simulator
- Modes: Single-player, multiplayer

Jane's IAF: Israeli Air Force (In Hebrew: כוכב כחול, Kochav Kachol, lit. "Blue Star") is a military jet aircraft Combat flight simulation video game released in 1998. The simulation was created by the Israeli software developer Pixel Multimedia and was released under the Jane's Combat Simulations line from Electronic Arts.

== Plot ==
The game, which is set in the Middle East, featured a single campaign mode which included several missions and a Massively Multiplayer Online Arena. There were two type of campaigns; the first type of campaigns featured recreations of several historic operations of the IAF such as the 1967 Six-Day War, the 1973 Yom Kippur War, and the 1982 Lebanon War. The second types of campaigns featured several fictional futuristic operations with Iraq, Syria, and Lebanon.

== Gameplay ==
Between the years 1998 and 2002 a player of the game could log onto Jane's Combat.Net website and find other potential players to play multiplayer games against. The multiplayer version of the game featured an "All-Out-War" mission or "Teamplay" (two teams against each other). There were also two additional aircraft which were available only in the multiplayer mode - the MiG-23 and MiG-29. The game can also be played with others over a LAN.

== Development ==
Jane's IAF: Israeli Air Force was developed by Pixel Multimedia, key members of which were also veterans of the Israeli Air Force. It was to be published by BMG Interactive, but after BMG closed its doors, Electronic Arts almost immediately picked up the rights.

== Critical reception ==
Reception

Aggregate score
| Aggregator | Score |
|---|---|
| GameRankings | 81% |

Review score
| Publication | Score |
|---|---|
| PC Games | B+ |

Robin G. Kim of Computer Gaming World said that while the game was not the most accurate of flight simulators, it had adequate "realism and manageable complexity". Meanwhile, T. Liam McDonald of GameSpot felt it was a worthy successor to Navy Fighters and ATF.

== See also ==
- Falcon 4.0
- Wings Over Israel
