= JASF: Jane's Advanced Strike Fighters =

2011 video game

- Developer(s): Trickstar Games
- Publisher(s): Evolved Games
- Series: Jane's Combat Simulations
- Platform(s): Windows, Xbox 360, PlayStation 3
- Release: October 18, 2011
- Genre(s): Combat flight simulator
- Mode(s): Single-player, multiplayer

JASF: Jane's Advanced Strike Fighters is an arcade-style flight simulator developed by Trickstar Games and published by Evolved Games. Released in October 2011, it was the first game to have the Jane's title in over a decade. Unlike the previous games in the Jane's Combat Simulations line, JASF does not feature realistic gameplay and instead focuses more on arcade-style gameplay.

== Story ==
For ten long years, the small island nation of Azbaristan has been rent by a disastrous civil war. Two factions of the government―the Northern People's Republic of Azbaristan and the Southern Azbaristan Democratic Front―have fought over resources, and thousands have died in the struggle. When the cease-fire was negotiated, the North controlled everything except the Southern capital city of Talvade. Knowing that the North's fiery leader, Chairman Kropanin Borzai, could order his forces to resume the war at any moment, the SADF wasted no time in petitioning the Western Democratic Alliance in a desperate plea for support. In exchange for exclusive trade rights to South Azbaristan's vast oil and natural gas reserves, the WDA sent help in the form of military advisors and hardware.

One exceptional individual is a fighter pilot known only by his call sign, Razor, who served in the Second Gulf War and has extensive experience in both air-to-air and air-to-ground operations with almost any fixed-wing combat aircraft. The skill and ability of this one pilot rival that of an entire squadron, North or South, and can hold his own even when outnumbered ten to one.

There are fifteen combat aircraft of four profiles to choose from―ground attack, multirole, fighter, and air superiority―each with two versions. They're divided by generation and range from classics like the F-4 Phantom II and MiG-21 Fishbed to the most advanced stealth aircraft like the F-22 Raptor and Su-50 PAK-FA, armed with a variety of air-to-air and air-to-ground munitions. Some are more specialized to one mission profile than others, with armament weighted toward that specialization, but all carry a cannon.

== Reception ==
JASF garnered generally unfavorable reviews and holds an average of 41/100 on aggregate web site Metacritic. Gamingbolt gave the game a 5/10, citing the shortness of the campaign as a reason for a low score. The game has also received a Mostly Negative review rating on Steam.
