= Jane's Fighters Anthology =

1997 video game

- Developer: Jane's Combat Simulations
- Publisher: Electronic Arts
- Series: Jane's Combat Simulations
- Platform: PC (Windows)
- Release: 1997
- Genre: Combat flight simulator
- Modes: Single-player, Multiplayer

Jane's Fighters Anthology is a 1997 compilation of combat flight simulation games released by Electronic Arts as part of the Jane's Combat Simulations series.

The anthology integrated into a single interface the campaigns, missions, and planes from the games U.S. Navy Fighters (1994) with content from its Marine Fighters expansion and Jane's US Navy Fighters 97 re-release, and Jane's ATF: Advanced Tactical Fighters (1996) with its Nato Fighters expansion and "Gold" re-release.

== Gameplay ==
Fighters Anthology features aircraft such as from fighters, bombers, transport, and civilian aircraft and helicopters. The game provides various modes of play which are Single Missions with 124 missions, Quick Mission Creator in which the player adjust parameters, Create Pro Mission, allows for creation of new missions and the editing of missions in the game, Replay Last Mission which is only active after a mission has been played and Campaign.

The Quick Mission Creator allows the creation of missions between friendly and enemy forces. The player assumes the role of friendly forces with a choice of 16 locations. Each force can have up to 3 wings with 5 aircraft in each wing and a choice of 4 experience levels per wing. The player can also choose whether the enemy forces can have targets (a choice of one from a list of 6 to 10 different targets including none depending on location) and whether they are defended by AAAs or SAMs and the level of defence. The player can choose from various other settings such as altitude; position; time of day; weather condition; combat with guns only or guns and missiles, and a weapons load out between standard or custom, the latter leading to an ordnance screen.

The ordnance screen also allows players to load out their aircraft with a choice of 24 air-to-air weapons and 50 air-to-ground weapons which include drop tanks, jammers and targeting pods.

== Story ==
Fighters Anthology features six campaigns: five hypothetical campaigns set in the Baltic region, Egypt, Kuril Islands, Ukraine and Vladivostok, and one historical campaign set in Vietnam which does not reward the player with campaign medals. Prior to starting a campaign, the player creates a pilot profile which allows them to choose a photograph of a pilot for an avatar, name and a choice of call signs with the option to enter a custom call sign. The profile stores information such as rank, status, number of failed missions and number of successful campaigns.

== Features ==
Fighters Anthology came with a second CD-ROM which is used when the Reference is accessed from the main menu. The Reference contains information from Jane's Information Group about the aircraft, ships, ground vehicles and weapons featured in the game with a selection of photographs and videos.
