= Spider: The Video Game =

1997 video game

- Developer: Boss Game Studios
- Publisher: BMG Interactive
- Composer: Barry Leitch
- Platform: PlayStation
- Release: NA: February 25, 1997; EU: April 1997
- Genre: Platform
- Mode: Single-player

Spider: The Video Game, is a 2.5D platform game developed by Boss Game Studios and published by BMG Interactive for the PlayStation. It was the only release published under the BMG Interactive label in the U.S. The player takes the role of a cybernetic spider, within which the mind of its creator, Dr. Michael Kelly, has been implanted.

== Plot ==
Dr. Michael Kelly is inventing a device that can transfer minds into cybernetic bugs. One night a nameless brain villain who is head of a company known as Micro Tech infiltrates his lab to steal the technology. During the invasion he gets shot and electrocuted and has his mind transferred inside the cybernetic spider also permanently attaching the headset device to his body. After going unconscious the raiders take his body with them to detach the device by any means possible and you as the spider must journey through places such as Labs, Factories, The City, Museum, Sewer, to stop Micro Tech and get your body back.

== Gameplay ==
The player must navigate 3D-drawn environments in a strictly 2D manner, traveling to the end of each level using typical platforming game mechanics. The player can use the spider's natural abilities, such as climbing walls and ceilings and using silk to lower itself, in order to overcome certain obstacles. He can also equip up to four of the ten different cybernetic leg attachments found throughout the game, which are used as weapons. When the player loses a life, all the acquired cybernetic attachments are lost except for the default slasher attachment. The obstacles include lab sinks, acid, test tubes and primarily other cybernetic creatures as enemies. After escaping the laboratory, the player goes to a factory, a museum, and various other locales, each infested with strange and malevolent creatures.

== Development ==
According to Boss Game Studios creative director Seth Mendelsohn, they used 2D gameplay for Spider because "We wanted to do a game that plays more like the traditional platform game, because they're fun to play. In full-form 3-D, you can't make a game that plays like a traditional platform game. There are issues about jumping and judging distance."

The team opted to make just three bosses for the game so they could give each one more focus, creating more animations and different behaviors for each one.

== Reception ==
Reception

Aggregate score
Aggregator	Score
GameRankings	78%

Review scores
Publication	Score
AllGame	4/5
Edge	5/10
Electronic Gaming Monthly	7.375/10
Famitsu	24/40
Game Informer	5.5/10
GameFan	79% (Note: Three critics of GameFan gave the game each a score of 80, 79, and 78.)
GameRevolution	B
GameSpot	7.6/10
IGN	6/10
Next Generation	3/5
PlayStation Official Magazine – UK	7/10

Spider: The Video Game received mixed to positive reviews. The most common subject of praise was the use of real spider abilities to crawl on any surface and lower oneself on a thread. Whether or not a critic recommended the game largely hinged on their opinion of the format of 2D gameplay in a 3D environment. As with Pandemonium!, which shares this format, Dan Hsu of Electronic Gaming Monthly dismissed Spider as a game with good graphics but mediocre gameplay, while his three co-reviewers praised it for its good control and sprawling, non-linear levels, though they complained that the camera occasionally causes problems. Next Generation, while noting that the graphics are good and the gameplay has some unique elements, maintained that the 2D nature of the gameplay makes it overly familiar. IGN was impressed with the realistic animation of the various creatures, but concluded that the game overall, while decent, lacks the excitement of Pandemonium!.

Ryan MacDonald of GameSpot judged it to be a highly enjoyable platformer, and particularly commended how well the spider perspective is handled. GamePro praised the impressive cinematics, unobtrusive music, and long, non-linear levels, and concluded, "You'll need all your spider powers for this game, which can be frustrating (especially when precise leaping is required), but in the end you'll find it's worth it." (Note: GamePro gave the game 4.5/5 for graphics, 4.5/5 for sound, 4.5/5 for fun factor, and 4/5 for control.)

The game held a 78% based on five reviews on the review aggregation website GameRankings based on five reviews.

Sales for Spider: The Video Game were seriously inhibited by BMG Interactive's problems with distribution; BMG vice president of product development Don Traeger later estimated that Spider only achieved 40% of the distribution it would have if it had been released by an established publisher. The game sold 200,000 copies.
