= Ashes Cricket 2013 =

2013 video game

- Developer: Trickstar Games
- Publisher: 505 Games
- Platform: Microsoft Windows
- Release: WW: 22 November 2013
- Genre: Sports
- Modes: Single-player, multiplayer

Ashes Cricket 2013 was a cricket video game that was developed by Trickstar Games and published by 505 Games. The game was released on 22 November 2013 for Windows, exclusively via Steam, for a short period of time before it was removed from sale. Furthermore, on 28 November 2013 the publisher 505 Games formally announced that the game had been cancelled and that refunds were to be given to anyone who had purchased it on Steam.

Ashes 2013 featured the official licensed Australian and English cricket teams, as well as 14 unlicensed national teams. The Xbox 360, PlayStation 3, Wii U, and retail PC releases were all cancelled following the game's troubled development and brief launch on Steam.

== Features ==
The game featured the 2013 Ashes cricket event series. It also planned for an improved fielding editor with up to 60 fielding options. There was also a plan for a new-look batting system which allows for a larger variety of shots. Weather and pitch conditions would also affect bowling styles. Match commentary is provided by Mark Nicholas, David Lloyd and Michael Slater.

== Development ==
Trickstar Games was developing a new gaming system built upon the beta version of Unity Engine to provide better gameplay in batting, bowling, and fielding. The game was originally to be released on 21 June 2013, however the release date was moved back to July 2013. With a release date still not specified, there were concerns that the game would not even make the revised July release. 505 Games then confirmed the game was being further delayed from a November 2013 release due to quality concerns, stating it is "simply not worthy of the Ashes name", despite the fact that the new release date missed the opening of the real-life Ashes series in Australia.

In that time, Mike Fegan of Trickstar Games had promised regular updates. He started a weekly video diary on the official Ashes Cricket 2013 Facebook page, but the flow of updates dried up over time and information about the game ceased.

The game was eventually released on Steam on 22 November 2013.

== Reception ==
The game received negative reviews from critics, cricket fans and the media, and there were several videos on YouTube featuring extensive bugs. The Ashes Cricket 2013 Facebook page has since been deleted, and the Twitter feed has remained inactive since July 2013.

Four days later after its release, it was removed from sale. It was finally announced on 28 November that all production of the game had been cancelled, along with plans to release console versions of the game, and that all people who purchased the game would receive a full refund. The publisher 505 Games apologized to the game's users and turned its attention to "protecting the Ashes name and that of the ECB and Cricket Australia".

It is widely featured as one of the worst games of 2013.
