= Courier Crisis =

1997 video game

- Developer: New Level Software
- Publishers: NA: GT Interactive; EU: BMG Interactive
- Platforms: PlayStation, Sega Saturn
- Release: PlayStation: NA: November 14, 1997; EU: November 1997; Sega Saturn: NA: December 20, 1997; EU: May 15, 1998
- Genre: Action
- Mode: Single-player

Courier Crisis is an action video game developed by American studio New Level Software for PlayStation and Sega Saturn in 1997.

Publisher BMG Interactive closed down its U.S. operations in mid-1997, and sold the U.S. publication rights for Courier Crisis to GT Interactive.

== Gameplay ==
The player is given a set amount of time to deliver a set amount of packages. Money can be earned to buy new bikes.

== Development ==
The game was originally scheduled to release in October 1997 for both PlayStation and Saturn. In June 1997, GT Interactive acquired the North American publishing rights to the game.

== Reception ==
Reception

Aggregate score
Aggregator	Score
GameRankings	54% (PS1)

Review scores
Publication	Score
Consoles +	85%
Electronic Gaming Monthly	5/10, 5/10, 7.5//10, 3.5/10 (PS1)
Famitsu	25/40 (SAT); 23/40 (PS1)
Game Informer	4.5/10
GameFan	68% (PS1) (Note: In GameFan's viewpoint of the PlayStation version, one critic gave it 70, and the rest gave it each a score of 67.)
GameSpot	2.3/10 (PS1)
IGN	3/10 (PS1)
Next Generation	1/5 (PS1)
PlayStation Official Magazine – UK	6/10 (PS1)
Sega Saturn Magazine	48% (SAT)

Courier Crisis was almost universally reviled by critics. The PlayStation version held a score of 54% on the review aggregation website GameRankings based on five reviews, even with an outlier of 89.5. Critics generally remarked that while the game's premise is fresh and promising, the execution is poor on nearly every front, bemoaning everything from rough graphics which hearken back to the PlayStation and Saturn's launch window titles, to voice clips which repeat frequently enough to be a serious annoyance, to frustrating, poorly responsive controls. Next Generation elaborated that "The bike handles terribly, responding to turns as if it were being ridden through sand. There's a quick-turn button, but this turns the bicycle so sharply that players inevitably end up stuck facing the wall." The reviewer also opined that the game's concept would have worked better as a bonus stage in a broader delivery game than as a standalone game. GameSpot summed it up as "A fantastic concept with endless possibility, but one that was executed so poorly here, even the most radical bunny-hop couldn't save the resultant product."

Most critics remarked that the game offers fleeting moments of fun, but soon becomes dull due to the repetitive level designs and lack of variety in the objectives. The four reviewers of Electronic Gaming Monthly also noted Courier Crisis has a sharp difficulty slope, being boringly easy for the first four stages before a spike in challenge in stage five. Dan Hsu enjoyed the challenge of the later stages, saying it requires the player to learn bike tricks to progress, but suspected that many players would give up on the game before reaching this point, while co-reviewer Crispin Boyer felt that the early stages and later stages represent two unpleasant extremes. Several critics also found the music terrible, though GamePro called it "rousing". However, GamePro also cited draw distance problems which make it unreasonably difficult to avoid hazards. (Note: GamePro gave the PlayStation version 3.0/5 for graphics, 3.0/5 for fun factor, 3.5/5 scores for sound, and 3.5/5 for control.) Other technical issues cited in reviews include slowdown, inaccurate collision detection, and a choppy frame rate.

The British Sega Saturn Magazine called Courier Crisis "the worst Saturn game we've received this year by some considerable way", and rebuked Sega of Europe for their decision to localize the game while passing on acclaimed overseas Saturn releases such as Grandia, Dead or Alive, and Vampire Savior. German magazine Sega Magazin offered a more favourable assessment of the Saturn version, awarding it 76%. Reviewer Oliver Preißner praised the variety and entertainment value of the gameplay, although he criticised the cumbersome controls and noted that the delivery missions became repetitive over time. In Japan, where the PlayStation version was localized and published by BMG Interactive on February 19, 1998, followed by the Saturn version on March 26, 1998, Famitsu gave it a score of 25 out of 40 for the latter, and 23 out of 40 for the former.
