= Firo & Klawd =

1996 video game

- Developer: Interactive Studios Limited
- Publisher: BMG Interactive
- Designer: Andrew Oliver; Philip Oliver
- Programmers: Andrew Oliver; Steve Bond; Darren Wood
- Composers: Phil Chill; Colin Payne
- Platforms: PlayStation, MS-DOS, Windows
- Release: 1996
- Genre: Platform
- Modes: Single-player, multiplayer

Firo & Klawd is an isometric video game published by BMG. It was released for PlayStation, MS-DOS, and Microsoft Windows in 1996.

== Gameplay ==
The player takes the role of either Firo (an ape police detective) or Klawd (an odd job cat) and sets out to find out who is distributing phony dollar bills around the city. Each level consists of branching paths to take in the story, some levels switch to a first person point of view where you shoot villains on screen however losing on these levels will cost you a life, all ending up at the same place eventually.

== Reception ==
The Spanish magazine Hobby Consolas gave the game a score of 86, French magazine Player One gave the game 88%, and the German magazine Video Games gave it 68%.
