= Bermuda Syndrome =

1995 video game

- Developer(s): Century Interactive
- Publisher(s): BMG Interactive
- Platform(s): Windows
- Release: 1995
- Genre(s): Cinematic platformer
- Mode(s): Single-player

Bermuda Syndrome is a video game developed by Century Interactive for Microsoft Windows and published by BMG Interactive in 1995. The game is similar in gameplay and appearance to the 1992 game Flashback. The player controls the main character from a third person sidescrolling perspective.

== Plot ==
The first panel

The main character is Jack Thompson, a member of a US air force strategic bomber squadron during World War II. During a mission above Germany his plane gets attacked by German fighters and catches fire. Somehow, a portal opens up as the plane is going down, and it enters what is presumably a parallel universe or an alternate timeline. Jack finds himself descending not upon the German countryside, but on a strange, unfamiliar jungle landscape. Meanwhile, on the ground, we see a tied up young woman, struggling to get loose as a gigantic carnivorous dinosaur approaches. Jack's plane luckily hits and decapitates the creature, preventing the woman from being eaten. At the last second Jack bails out, and at the beginning of the game he dangles in his parachute from a tree, with a boot-knife as his only weapon. After cutting the woman loose, she is revealed to be a princess who was going to be sacrificed as an attempt to save her father's life. She becomes Jack's companion throughout the game.

== Gameplay ==
The adventure consists of a large number of static panels across which the player moves to solve puzzles and battle dinosaurs. Objects can be picked up, and using them in the right context is often required to progress to the next screen. Other problems are often solved by jumping or interacting with the princess.

== Reception ==
The game received mixed reviews. Most agreed however that the game's graphics were excellent for its time. Coming Soon magazine wrote: "The most delightful aspect of this game has to be the background scenery. Every panel is unique and represents enormous effort and talent." justadventure.com, however, were overall critical of the game because of its hard puzzles, and gave it a "D" on a scale running from A through F. The reviewer wrote: "Eye and ear candy are nothing if a game's no fun to play, and The Bermuda Syndrome is definitely not fun to play." On the other hand, a-for-adventure.com praised the graphics as well as the challenge provided for experienced adventure-gamers.

== Legacy ==
After the end of support for the game, Gregory Montoir reverse engineered in 2007 the game engine and wrote a substitute which allowed the porting of the game to modern platforms, like the OpenPandora handheld.
