= Jane's Combat Simulations =

- Genre: Combat flight simulators
- Developers: Electronic Arts; EA Baltimore; Looking Glass Studios; Origin Systems; Pixel Multimedia; Sonalysts
- Publisher: Electronic Arts
- Platforms: DOS; Windows
- First release: Jane's ATF: Advanced Tactical Fighters; April 1, 1996
- Latest release: JASF: Jane's Advanced Strike Fighters; October 18, 2011

Jane's Combat Simulations was a brand of combat flight simulators and naval warfare games published for DOS and Windows by Electronic Arts from 1995 to 2000, and later by other companies under license by Jane's Information Group. It is named after editor and publisher of military reference books Fred T. Jane.

== Development ==
Electronic Arts' license was announced in 1995 and intended to lend authenticity and accuracy to EA's growing line of combat games. The Jane's brand was initially applied to games derived from EA's 1994 release U.S. Navy Fighters, including Jane's ATF: Advanced Tactical Fighters, an updated version of the original game called Jane's US Navy Fighters 97, and the compilation Jane's Fighters Anthology.

Other titles would be developed by studios owned or affiliated with Electronic Arts, with EA Baltimore developing titles focusing on specific jet fighters, Origin Systems featuring Longbow helicopters, Sonalysts creating naval combat titles, and Pixel Multimedia developing titles revolving around the IAF and USAF.

The creative leads behind the Jane's Combat Simulations line were Andy Hollis and Paul Grace, designers who previously worked on games such as F-19 Stealth Fighter and Chuck Yeager's Advanced Flight Trainer.

Development of the game Jane's Attack Squadron began at Looking Glass Studios unrelated to the Jane's brand with the title Flight Combat, but would be renamed after publishing was picked up by Electronic Arts in 1998. The game was plagued with development issues and ultimately cancelled, but after the bankruptcy of Looking Glass Studios, the unfinished game would be acquired and completed by Mad Doc Software. Xicat Interactive acquired the Jane's license after it expired at EA, publishing the game for Mad Doc in 2002.

The last game to bear the Jane's brand, JASF: Jane's Advanced Strike Fighters, was an arcade-style flight simulator developed by Trickstar Games and published by Maximum Family Games in 2011.

== Games ==
- U.S. Navy Fighters (1994) DOS
  - Marine Fighters expansion (1995) DOS
  - U.S. Navy Fighters Gold (1995) Windows
  - Jane's US Navy Fighters 97 (1996) Windows
- Jane's ATF: Advanced Tactical Fighters (1996) DOS
  - NATO Fighters expansion (1996) DOS
  - Jane's Advanced Tactical Fighters Gold (1997) Windows
- Jane's AH-64D Longbow (1996) DOS
  - Flash Point Korea expansion (1996) DOS
  - Jane's Longbow Gold (1997) DOS, Windows
- Jane's 688(i) Hunter/Killer (1997) Windows
- Jane's Longbow 2 (1997) Windows
- Jane's WWII Fighters (1998) Windows
- Jane's F-15 (1998) Windows
- Jane's IAF: Israeli Air Force (1998) Windows
- Jane's Fleet Command (1999) Windows
- Jane's USAF (1999) Windows
- Jane's F/A-18 (2000) Windows

== Collections ==
- Jane's Fighters Anthology (1997) Windows
- Jane's Longbow Anthology (1998) DOS, Windows
- Jane's Attack Pack (1998) DOS, Windows – ATF, USNF'97, and Longbow
- Jane's Air Superiority Collection (2000) Windows – F-15, IAF, and USAF
- Jane's Naval Warfare Collection (2000) Windows – 688(i), F/A-18, and Fleet Command

== Games by other developers ==
- Jane's Attack Squadron (2002) Windows
- JASF: Jane's Advanced Strike Fighters (2011) Windows
