= Three Lions (video game) =

1998 video game

- Developers: Z-Axis; Tarantula Studios (GBC)
- Publisher: Take-Two Interactive
- Composer: Allister Brimble
- Platforms: Microsoft Windows, PlayStation, Game Boy Color
- Release: EU: 17 April 1998; EU: 1999 (GBC); NA: 21 May 1999 (PS)
- Genre: Sports
- Modes: Single player, multiplayer

Three Lions – The Official England Team Game, released in North America as Alexi Lalas International Soccer, is a video game developed by Z-Axis and published by Take-Two Interactive, based on European football (soccer). It was released for the PC, PlayStation and Game Boy Color on 17 April 1998 and in 1999 as the official video game of the English Football Association. Originally announced under the title "Major League Soccer", it was also marketed under other names in other regions, including Golden Goal 98, Bomba:98 All Champions Challenge, Mundial:98 and Pro:Foot Contest 98.

== Cover stars ==
Editions of the game in different regions feature native international footballers. In France, Pro:Foot Contest 98 features Didier Deschamps, in Italy, Bomba:98 All Champions Challenge features Roberto Di Matteo, in North America, Alexi Lalas International Soccer features Alexi Lalas.

== Development ==
Three Lions was developed under the title "Major League Soccer" for publisher BMG Interactive, but after BMG shut down, publication was taken on by Take-Two Interactive.

== Reception ==
Reception

Aggregate score
Aggregator	Score
GameRankings	49%

Review scores
Publication	Score
CNET Gamecenter	7/10
Computer and Video Games	2/5
Edge	7/10
Electronic Gaming Monthly	3.25/10 (Note: Two critics of Electronic Gaming Monthly gave the game each a score of 2.5/10, and two others gave it each a score of 4/10.)
Game Informer	2.25/10
GameSpot	3.3/10
IGN	5.5/10
Next Generation	3/5
Official U.S. PlayStation Magazine	1/5
PC Gamer (UK)	(PC) 41%
PlayStation: The Official Magazine	2.5/5

The PlayStation version received unfavorable reviews according to the review aggregation website GameRankings.

Next Generation said, "If you're looking for speedy, no-nonsense physical play, you could do a lot worse than Alexi Lalas International Soccer." Extreme PlayStation said, "Three Lions doesn't boast great graphics and has a few niggling flaws (like the omission of any type of analog control), but there's enough innovation and gameplay here to give the other World Cup bandwagon games a run for their money."
