= Monkey Hero =

1999 video game

- North American box art
- Developer: Blam!
- Publisher: Take-Two Interactive
- Platform: PlayStation
- Release: NA: February 26, 1999; EU: 1999
- Genre: Role-playing
- Mode: Single-player

Monkey Hero (The Adventures of Monkey Hero in Europe) is a role-playing video game developed by Blam! and published by Take-Two Interactive for the PlayStation. The game is similar to the likes of The Legend of Zelda and Secret of Mana and borrows many ideas from these games, such as a top-down perspective and gameplay focused on exploration, combat, and puzzle-solving. Gameplay elements include large dungeons, fighting and puzzles. It has a whimsical manga-inspired look that makes use of both 3D and 2D graphics.

The plot is centered around Monkey, the goofy top-knotted main character. Monkey is sent to the Waking Realm to defeat the Nightmare King and under the guidance of Master Sage, must reclaim all of the pieces of the Magic Storybook. The various pieces of the Magic Storybook are displayed on an in game map.

== Story ==
The game begins outside a mine with Monkey's friend, friend Tiger. She asks Monkey to take a cart into the mine. Monkey obliges, and while in the mine, an unexpected explosion causes Monkey to fall to the lower levels of the mine. Monkey finds a treasure chest with a bamboo staff in, which becomes his main weapon for the rest of the game. Monkey eventually finds his way out of the mine, and then meets Master Sage, Monkey's teacher. He gives Monkey a headband that allows for them to communicate over long distances. Master Sage asks Monkey to travel to the library to stop the Nightmare King from stealing the Magic Storybook. The Nightmare King has invaded the Waking Realm and upset the balance, and it's up to Monkey to remove the Nightmares and restore the balance.

Monkey goes through many dungeons and catacombs such as a graveyard crawling with zombies and ghosts, a mountain called Dragon Mountain and even the heart of a crashed alien space craft. He also has to deal with one of his friends thinking of betraying him to arm the Nightmares with a new weapon.

== Characters ==
- Monkey - The main character, he has appeared from the dream realm to restore the balance. He is friendly and easy to get along with, and is well known throughout the waking Realm. He is loosely based on the Chinese god Sun Wukong.
- Master Sage - Master Sage is Monkey's teacher. He provides Monkey with information throughout the game, and provides tutorials and tips throughout the game. He also supplies the player with new weapons and tells stories about Monkey's past. He wears a blue cloak and has long grey hair.
- Tiger - Tiger is Monkey’s best friend. She is an Anthropomorphic tiger.
- Rumple - Rumple is another of Monkey’s friends. He is a blond genius inventor wearing a white lab coat and thick rimmed glasses. He is very intelligent and gifted, but upon meeting him in a swamp south of the Fontune Village and Bamboo Grove, he has invented a new weapon, the Exploding Spears, He betrays Monkey and swears allegiance to the Nightmare King. However he quickly sees sense when Monkey scolds him.
- Pigsy - Another of Monkey’s friends. You can fight his pet monsters in a mini game for a Giant Peach.
- Dream King - The Dream King is the leader of the Dream world and has a direct influence into the Waking realm. He may be related to Monkey but that is found out at the end of the game.
- Nightmare King - The leader of the Nightmare World and the main villain in the game, he resembles a roach and is the first boss fight in the game. He leads all of the nightmares in the game.

== Gameplay ==
The player's health is measured in peaches. When certain tasks are performed, the player can acquire big peaches, which increase overall health.

In a similar fashion to games in The Legend of Zelda series, the player collects equipment and magical items that allow them to progress past a variety of hazards and obstructions in the game's world. These items are often found in "dungeon" areas - contained areas with a specific focus on the particular obstacle that the item allows the player to resolve.

At the end of each dungeon there is a boss that must be defeated in order to complete the dungeon.

There are three realms, as underlined in the manual: the Dream Realm, the Nightmare Realm, and the Waking Realm.

== Development ==
The game's story and many of the characters were inspired by Chinese legends, in particular the folk tale Monkey. Huge anime fans, developers Jeronimo Barrera and Jay Minn hired artists from the comic book industry and gave them a number of anime and kung fu films for reference.

Technical director Greg Marquez wrote a development tool specifically for the game called MOPA (Map Objects Puzzle Attributes), which enabled designers to snap large 3D objects together using 2D tile representations.

Blam! had plans to port the game to Microsoft Windows, but these never came to fruition. The game's original publisher, BMG Interactive, was closed down, and the publication rights were picked up by Take-Two Interactive. The game was released in Japan in May 2000.

== Reception ==
Reception

Aggregate score
Aggregator	Score
GameRankings	47%

Review scores
Publication	Score
AllGame	2/5
Electronic Gaming Monthly	4/10
Game Informer	5.5/10
GameSpot	3.6/10
IGN	3/10
Official U.S. PlayStation Magazine	2/5
PlayStation: The Official Magazine	3.5/5

The game received "unfavorable" reviews according to the review aggregation website GameRankings.
