= Hal Bernton =

American journalist

Hal Bernton is an American author and journalist. He worked for The Seattle Times from 2000 until March 2023, and previously worked for The Oregonian and Anchorage Daily News. He was part of two reporting teams that received Pulitzer Prizes. He has received journalism grants from the Pulitzer Center, and had an O'Brien Fellowship in Public Service Journalism at Marquette University from 2013 to 2014.
