= Stormovik: SU-25 Soviet Attack Fighter =

1990 video game

- Developer: Electronic Arts
- Publisher: Electronic Arts
- Platform: MS-DOS
- Release: October 1990
- Genre: Combat flight simulation

Stormovik: SU-25 Soviet Attack Fighter is a combat flight simulation game developed and published by Electronic Arts. It was released for MS-DOS in 1990.

== Gameplay ==
Stormovik: SU-25 Soviet Attack Fighter is a game in which high ranking members of the American and Soviet national defense industries use terrorism to sabotage relations between the two nations.

== Reception ==
Stanley R. Trevena reviewed the game for Computer Gaming World, and stated that "Deficiencies aside, this writer found it strangely appealing to roam the skies over Germany, hunting down and destroying both NATO and Warsaw Pact hardware."
