= 7 Wonders (video game) =

1997 video game

- Developer: Computer Multimedia Systems
- Publisher: NewCom
- Platform: Windows
- Release: 1997
- Genre: Platformer
- Mode: Single-player

7 Wonders (Russian: 7 чудес) is a 1997 Russian platform video game developed by Computer Multimedia Systems and published by NewCom.

== Plot ==
The game follows explorer Professor Nikolsky, who brought back seven books about the Seven Wonders of the Ancient World from an expedition. Professor Nikolsky must find the lost pages of each one of the seven books in order to solve the riddles in the valley of monsters that guard an enchanted girl in order to free her.

== Gameplay ==
The levels feature several stories and obstacles that the player must avoid, as well as items needed to progress, such as keys to unlock doors or boards to cross over a chasm. Weapons are not included among the items.

== Production ==
In 1997, the year when 7 Wonders was developed and published, the Russian video game industry began started moving gradually from commercial projects for the domestic market to relatively regular and professional projects.

The game and the physical copy includes an illustrated book with three-dimensional models of the Seven Wonders and stories about the times of the monuments.
