= VR Stalker =

1994 video game

- Developer: Morpheus Interactive
- Publishers: NA: American Laser Games; PAL: BMG Interactive
- Artist: Ken Bretschneider
- Platform: 3DO
- Release: NA: 1994; PAL: 1995
- Genre: Combat flight simulator
- Mode: Single-player

VR Stalker is a combat flight simulator video game developed by Morpheus Interactive and originally published by American Laser Games for the 3DO.

== Gameplay ==
Gameplay screenshot

VR Stalker is a combat flight simulator featuring jets such as the F-14, F-16, and A-10.

== Development ==
VR Stalker was developed by Utah-based Morpheus Interactive and was originally published by American Laser Games in the United States in 1994 as the first flight simulator for the 3DO. The following year, the game was picked up for PAL region distribution by BMG Interactive. Portions of the gameplay and graphics were reworked for this release and the game had to be resubmitted to The 3DO Company for approval.

After VR Stalker, Morpheus made announcements for a multi-vehicle shooter game for 3DO called Saturncide and a personal computer game called Secrets of the Luxor, originally based on a Luxor Las Vegas attraction. Trademarks were filed for other titles including Geneticide and Fatal Contract. Morpheus entered a publishing agreement with Sanctuary Woods and began work on a real-time 3D engine with plans to release number of games starting in 1996. The partnership was dissolved shortly thereafter when Sanctuary Woods underwent corporate restructuring. Development of Secrets of the Luxor eventually went to Strata Interactive. None of Morpheus' other projects ever materialized. Morpheus president Ken Bretschneider, who worked as a digital and fine artist for VR Stalker, later went on to co-found The Void, a company which created virtual reality entertainment attractions.

== Reception ==
Reception

Review scores
Publication	Score
Electronic Gaming Monthly	24/40
GamePro	3.75/5
Joystick	139/200
Next Generation	3/5
3DO Magazine	2/5
Games World	59%
Electronic Games	B
MAN!AC	49%
Super GamePower	4/5
VideoGames	6/10

Next Generation reviewed the game, rating it three stars out of five, and stated that "A mild disappointment, but not if you are looking for fast action."

3DO Magazine gave the game two stars out of five, finding "plenty of fast, frantic action and varied missions" but that it "sits awkwardly between Shock Wave and Flying Nightmares, lacking the stunning arcade visuals of the former, while falling equally short on the realism stakes compared to the latter."
