= Trickstar Games =

Australian computer game developer

- Type: Private
- Industry: Video games
- Founded: November 2009
- Founders: Mike Fegan; Tony Parkes
- Defunct: June 28, 2016
- Fate: Liquidation
- Headquarters: Melbourne, Australia
- Subsidiaries: Sector3 Games

Trickstar Games Pty Ltd was an Australian video game development company headquartered in Melbourne, Australia. They developed content for Nintendo and Sony-based platforms, as well as Microsoft desktop-based computers. The company was founded in November 2009 by former members of Transmission Games, such as Mike Fegan and Tony Parkes, following the closure of that studio the previous month. On 8 April 2010, the company announced that they had acquired Sector3 Games, another Australian casual game development studio. Trickstar was also the successor to Transmission's titles, including International Cricket 2010, JASF: Jane's Advanced Strike Fighters and the ill-fated Ashes Cricket 2013.

An application was lodged to wind up Trickstar Games on 12 May 2015.
