= Backpacker (video game series) =

- Cover for Backpacker
- Genres: Quiz, Adventure
- Developers: TATI Mixedia; Aniware AB; Pan Vision AB
- Publishers: BMG Interactive; Pan Vision AB
- Platforms: Microsoft Windows; Mac OS
- First release: Backpacker; 1995
- Latest release: Backpacker 3 - The Collection; 2006

Backpacker is a series of Swedish computer games. The games are travel simulators where the player travels the world and answers questions. The graphics in the games consists mostly of static images. The series has never been released for game consoles.

The series was originally developed by Tati Mixedia and Aniware AB and published by BMG Interactive. After Backpacker 2, Pan Vision AB took over the series.

== Gameplay ==
The game is about traveling around to different cities in the world and answering questions about the locations. In order to get the money needed for traveling, the player have to take different jobs.

There can be several different goals in the game. Either that travel around the world in the shortest time to visit as many cities as possible or to get certificates in as many jobs as possible. In Backpacker 3 there are also other missions.

== Backpacker ==
Backpacker was released in 1995 on one CD-ROM. The game was developed by Stefan Gadnell and Jens Thorsen.

== Backpacker 2 ==
Backpacker 2 was released in 1997 on two CD-ROMs. As of 2010, it had sold 600,000 copies in the Nordic countries. The game contains 70 destinations, 70 different jobs and 6,000 questions. It has two difficulty levels, Tourist and Globetrotter.

== Backpacker 3 ==
Backpacker 3 was released on 24 October 2003 by Pan Vision AB. It is programmed in Macromedia director. The game includes 100 destinations and 9,000 questions. There are different levels of difficulty to the questions so that both adults and children can play.

The game received a positive review and a rating of 4/5 by the newspaper Aftonbladet, its readers gave a rating of 3.45/5 (as of March 2011). The graphics was criticized in a review in the newspaper Expressen. It was the eighth best-selling video game in Sweden in 2003.

=== Expansions ===
Two expansion packs were released in 2004. Backpacker 3: Mediterraneo includes 15 new destinations in the Mediterranean region and contains 2,100 questions. Backpacker 3: Americana includes 15 new destinations in and around the United States, and contains 2,600 questions.

In 2006, Backpacker 3 and the two expansion packs was released in a collection box.

== Titles ==
Game	Date	Publisher	Ref(s)
Backpacker	1995	BMG Interactive	
Backpacker 2	1997	BMG Interactive	
Backpacker Junior	1997	Vision Park AB	
Backpacker 3	24 October 2003	Pan Vision AB	
Backpacker 3: Mediterraneo	29 October 2004	Pan Vision AB	
Backpacker 3: Americana	29 October 2004	Pan Vision AB	
Backpacker 3 DVD	1 November 2005	Pan Vision AB	
Backpacker 3 - The Collection	16 January 2006	Pan Vision AB	
