= Auto Destruct =

1997 video game

- North American cover art
- Developer: Neurostone
- Publisher: Electronic Arts
- Platform: PlayStation
- Release: EU: 23 December 1997; NA: 31 January 1998
- Genres: Shooter, vehicular combat
- Mode: Single-player

Auto Destruct is a 1997 vehicular combat video game developed by the Swedish studio Neurostone and published by Electronic Arts for the PlayStation. The player takes on the role of a retired race car driver hunting down the fanatical cult that murdered his wife and daughter. The music was composed by English electronic producer Danny Briottet.

== Gameplay ==
The player takes control of a futuristic supercar in 3D urban environments and must accomplish a series of missions. Objectives vary widely, and include seek-and-destroy missions, escort missions, and taxicab driving.

== Plot ==
A cult known as the Disciples of Lazarus orchestrates a rash of terrorist attacks in San Francisco. Booth, a retired race car driver, lost his family members during the event. He is then contacted by an organization known as the Temple, whose mission is to stop the cultists from destroying the world. Booth accepted the invitation and is then provided with the heavily armored supercar, and traveled across the world from San Francisco, New York, and Tokyo.

== Reception ==
Reception

Aggregate score
Aggregator	Score
GameRankings	61%

Review scores
Publication	Score
AllGame	2.5/5
CNET Gamecenter	8/10
Consoles +	88%
Electronic Gaming Monthly	7.25/10 (Note: Four critics of Electronic Gaming Monthly gave the game each a score of 7/10, 8/10, 6.5/10, and 7.5/10.)
Game Informer	7/10
GameSpot	4.4/10
IGN	6/10
Next Generation	3/5
PlayStation Official Magazine – UK	6/10
Official U.S. PlayStation Magazine	3/5

Auto Destruct saw a range of opinions from critics. Next Generation said that the game sets itself apart from other vehicular combat games with its variety of missions, the depth added by its resource management elements, and most especially its detailed and expansive 3D city environments, which give the player unprecedented freedom. They criticized that the graphics look like a first generation PlayStation game and the music and sound effects are generic, and concluded that the game is "a good ride, but it could have been much more." Three of the four reviewers for Electronic Gaming Monthly similarly said that though the graphics have problems, the missions, resource management, and massive environments give Auto Destruct more depth and potentially more enjoyment than other vehicular combat games. They also praised the usefulness of the radar, and said the resources are balanced such that what the player needs is always just within reach, leaving only oneself to blame for failure. Only Shawn Smith deferred, saying the missions eventually start to all feel the same. Joe Smith of GameSpot, however, gave the reverse opinion, saying the graphics outshine those of other vehicular combat games, but the mission-based format drags the game down by restricting players to a very specific set of actions rather than letting them do what they want. He found the missions repetitive as well.

IGN's Adam Douglas shared Smith's opinion that the missions are unremarkable and repetitive, but agreed with other critics that the graphics are dated and unimpressive. However, he found the game enjoyable overall and gave it a mild recommendation: " It's not terribly original or exciting, but it gets the job done and is pretty entertaining to boot. If you're really into driving and shooting, give it a go. For anyone else, though, I'd suggest a rental session first." GamePro found the game adequate in most respects, with the exception of the music, which they described as "monotonous droning". They said the variety of missions is the game's standout feature, and like IGN they suggested that fans of the genre buy it and those who are simply curious should rent it first. (Note: GamePro gave the game 3.5/5 for graphics, sound, control, and fun factor.) The game held a 61% on the review aggregation website GameRankings based on five reviews.

In a retrospective review for Allgame, Shawn Sackenheim declared that "Auto Destruct is an astoundingly mediocre game. While it doesn't really do anything wrong, it just seems uninspired and run of the mill." He elaborated that the graphics look like those of a 1995 game, the missions are uninspired and all feel the same, and the music and sound effects are average and standard.
