= Battle group =

Battle group may refer to:

- Battlegroup (army), the basic building block of an army's fighting force
- Battleship battle group, a battleship and its escorts
- Carrier battle group, a carrier and its escorts
- Battlegroup of the European Union, an army battle group project of the European Union
- Battle group, a subunit of a United States pentomic division
