= 688(I) Hunter/Killer =

1997 video game

Jane's 688(I) Hunter/Killer
- Developers: Sonalysts, Inc.
- Publisher: Electronic Arts
- Producer: Ed Gwynn
- Programmers: David Capizzano; Robert Costello; Mel Davey; Scott Martin; Tod Swain
- Composers: Dave Frazer; Neil M. Goldberg; Curt Ramm
- Series: Jane's Combat Simulations
- Platform: Microsoft Windows
- Release: NA: June 27, 1997; EU: 1997
- Genre: Submarine simulator
- Modes: Single-player, multiplayer

Jane's 688(i) Hunter/Killer is a 1997 submarine simulator video game, developed by Sonalysts Inc. and published by Electronic Arts and more recently by Strategy First for Windows 95 compatible operating systems. It is named after the 688 (Improved) Los Angeles class of United States (SSN) submarine, and was a successor to the earlier game 688 Attack Sub. It is part of the Jane's Combat Simulations series. It was released on Valve's Steam content delivery service as well as DotEmu.

== Development ==
688(I) Hunter/Killer was developed by Sonalysts Inc., which had previously developed submarine simulations and wargames for the United States Department of Defense. The developers limited themselves to plausible real world scenarios, based on projections from Jane's Information Group. Because of the authentic tactics and technology being simulated, Sonalysts had the Pentagon review the game to ensure that it did not contain any valuable military secrets.

The game was developed using custom software tools, with the exception of the ship models, which were done using PowerAnimator.

== Reception ==
View of the broadband part of the sonar room

T. Liam McDonald gave 688(I) Hunter/Killer an 8.8 out of 10 in GameSpot, lauding the depth, complexity, and realism of the simulation, and the way the different systems and stations are integrated such that the player can naturally switch between them.

Next Generation rated the game four stars out of five.

The game sold more than 200,000 copies.

== Reviews ==
- Subsim (December 7, 1997)
- Gamezilla (1997)
- Game Revolution (September 1, 1997)
- PC Jeux (September 1997)

== See also ==
- Silent Hunter
- Tom Clancy's SSN
