= Center for International Maritime Security =

Nonprofit public policy think tank

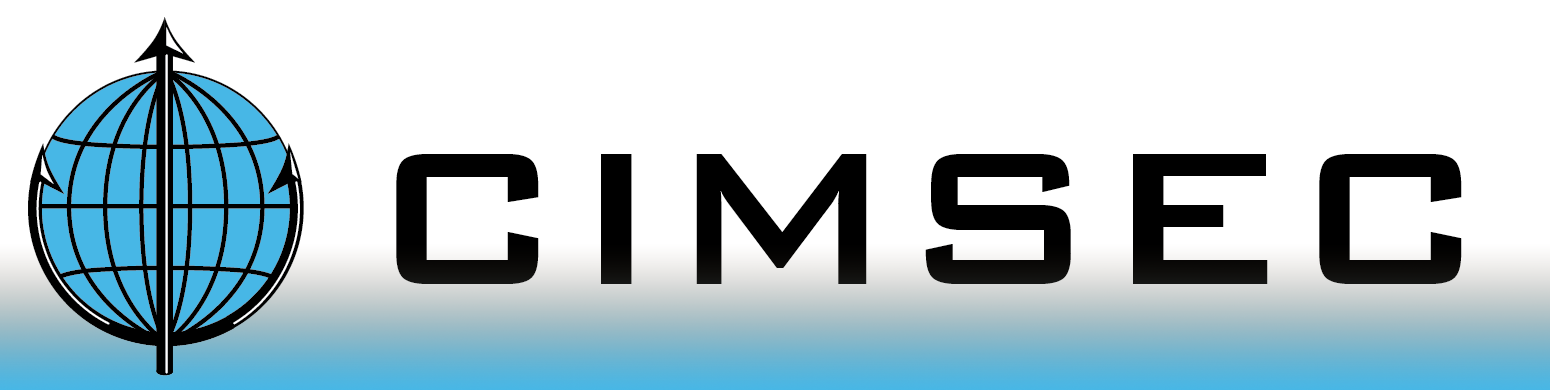
- Abbreviation: CIMSEC
- Formation: 2012
- Type: Public policy think tank
- Headquarters: Silver Spring, Maryland
- Chairman of the Board of Directors: Chris O'Connor
- President: Christopher J. Stockdale-Garbutt
- Website: cimsec.org

The Center for International Maritime Security (CIMSEC) is a 501(c)(3) non-partisan think tank incorporated as a non-profit in the state of Maryland. CIMSEC was formed in 2012 and as of 2021 has 20 international chapters and over 3,000 members and subscribers in 60 countries.

The current President of CIMSEC is Christopher Stockdale-Garbutt and its Chairman of the Board of Directors is Chris O'Connor.

== History ==
CIMSEC was founded in 2012 by Scott Cheney-Peters, who also established the organization's first chapter in Washington, DC.

== Publications and products ==
In 2015 CIMSEC published its first compendium, "Private Military Contractors", featuring curated content from CIMSEC members.

Since its founding, CIMSEC has featured articles on its NextWar blog dealing with myriad issues surrounding international maritime security. CIMSEC actively solicits articles from the maritime security community at large.

Analysis by CIMSEC members has been referenced in numerous publications, including Reuters, the Center for New American Security, Popular Mechanics, the United States Naval Institute and the Maritime Executive.

== Chapters ==
CIMSEC has numerous chapters across the world, including North America, the UK, Europe, Africa, and Asia. Members are able to establish their own local chapters.
