= Chuck Yeager's Air Combat =

1991 video game

- Developer: Brent Iverson
- Publisher: Electronic Arts
- Platforms: MS-DOS, Macintosh
- Release: 1991
- Genre: Air combat simulation
- Mode: Single-player

Chuck Yeager's Air Combat is a 1991 combat flight simulation video game by Electronic Arts. Chuck Yeager was a technical consultant in the game and his digitized voice is featured in the game, giving encouragement and praise before and after missions. The game is characterized for its balance of an action laden gameplay which focuses on classical dog fights and a simple yet realistic flight model.

The game was initially available for MS-DOS, and later ported to the Macintosh. The latter version is considered superior as its graphical display is at a much higher resolution, multi-player network play is supported, and saved movies may be exported in QuickTime format.

== Gameplay ==
The game features three modes: Free Flight, which put the user in a selected airplane in a non-hostile environment; Create a Mission, where the user could specify which airplane to pilot against a selected number of AI-driven aircraft of varying levels of difficulty; and Historical Flight, where user could select among three wars to fly in: World War II, Korea, and Vietnam.

All missions are based upon actual missions ranging from strafing attacks of World War II, the open dogfights of late 20th century air warfare, and the combat missions of Vietnam, which included bomber escorts. The name of the actual pilot involved and the outcome of the encounter are told to the player, as a way for the player to judge air combat prowess (though it did not affect the overall scoring). This feature separated the game from other similar games of its time, and influenced future work on later flight simulations. However, large, famous battles in the wars are not included (for example, there are no D-Day, Pearl Harbor, or Battle of Britain missions). For World War II, the missions are based solely on the European Theater of Operations.

== Reception ==
Computer Gaming World in 1991 said that Chuck Yeager's graphics and flight models impressed a Vietnam War combat pilot, and predicted that it would be popular with both flight sim veterans and newcomers. A survey in the magazine that year of strategy and war games gave it four and a half stars out of five, a 1993 survey in the magazine of wargames gave the game three-plus stars. and a 1994 survey gave the Macintosh version ("a few minor improvements") four stars out of five. In 1994, the magazine stated that Hellcats Over the Pacific and F/A-18 Hornet had better graphics on the Macintosh but Chuck Yeager's flying was more realistic, despite the lack of a rudder. The magazine concluded that it "is worth a test flight, especially for we Mac-types who must live on a thin diet of top-flight games". In 1996, the magazine ranked it as the 35th best PC game of all time.

In 1994, PC Gamer US named Air Combat the 9th best computer game ever. The editors wrote that the game does not have the most realistic flight models in the world, in addition to plane and ground graphics showing their age, but noted that it has realistic sense of flight. That same year, PC Gamer UK named it the 47th best computer game of all time.

In 1998, PC Gamer declared it the 23rd-best computer game ever released, and the editors called it "classic" and a "golden oldie".

== Reviews ==
- Fire & Movement #76
