= You and Me =

You and Me may refer to:

== Books ==
- You & Me, a 2012 novel by Padgett Powell
- Yuu & Mii, a 1984 manga by Hiroshi Aro

== Film and television ==
- You and Me (1938 film), by Fritz Lang
- You and Me (Neowa Na), a 1967 South Korean film starring Choi Moo-ryong
- You and Me (1971 film), by Larisa Shepitko
- You and Me (1975 film), by David Carradine
- You and Me (2004 film) (Hum Tum), an Indian film by Kunal Kohli
- You and Me (2005 film) (Wo men lia), a Chinese film directed by Ma Liwen
- You and Me (1974 British TV series), a British children's television programme
- You and Me (American TV series), a 1993 telethon series on Christian Television Network
- You and Me (New Zealand TV series), a family show hosted by Suzy Cato
- You & Me (2023 British TV series), a British romantic-comedy drama television series
- You and Me (anime) (Kimi to Boku), a 2011 anime series based on the manga Kimi to Boku

== Music ==
=== Artists ===
- You+Me, duo with Alecia Moore and Dallas Green, and the title song, "You and Me" (see below)

=== Albums ===
- You 'n' Me (Al Cohn-Zoot Sims Quintet album), 1960
- You & Me (Joe Bonamassa album), 2006
- You & Me (EP), by KARD, 2017
- You and Me (Open Hand album), and the title song, 2005
- You and Me (Shane Filan album), 2013
- You and Me (Tammy Wynette album), and the title song (see below), 1976
- You & Me (The Walkmen album), 2008
- You and Me, by Declan Galbraith, and the title song, 2007
- You and Me, by Little Brazil, and the title song, 2005

=== Songs ===
- "You and Me" (Alice Cooper song)
- "You & Me" (Ayumi Hamasaki song)
- "U & Me", by Cappella
- "U & Mi", by Dr. Alban
- "You and Me" (Cameron Whitcomb song)
- "You and Me" (Damon Albarn song)
- "You and Me" (Dave Matthews Band song)
- "You & Me" (Disclosure song)
- "You & Me" (The Flirts song)
- "You & Me" (Jennie song)
- "You and Me" (Joan Franka song)
- "You and Me" (La Toya Jackson song)
- "You and Me" (Lifehouse song)
- "You and Me" (LL Cool J song)
- "You & Me" (Marc E. Bassy song)
- "U + Me (Love Lesson)", by Mary J. Blige
- "You and Me" (The Moody Blues song)
- "You and Me" (Olympic theme song), the theme song of the 2008 Summer Olympics
- "You & Me" (Superfly song)
- "You and Me" (Takasa song)
- "You and Me" (Tammy Wynette song)
- "You and Me" (Uniting Nations song)
- "You and Me (Babe)", by Ringo Starr
- "You and Me (Tonight)", by Alistair Griffin
- "You and Me Song", by The Wannadies
- "Now and Forever (You and Me)", by Anne Murray
- "Promise (You and Me)", by Reamonn
- "You and Me", by Aaron Pritchett from In the Driver's Seat
- "You and Me", by Archers of Loaf from Icky Mettle
- "You and Me", by Aretha Franklin from Spirit in the Dark
- "You and Me", by Aṣa from Lucid
- "You and Me", by Ben Rector from Something Like This
- "You and Me", by Bowling for Soup from Tell Me When to Whoa
- "You and Me", by the Byrds, from the reissue of Mr. Tambourine Man
- "You + Me", by Carola Häggkvist from My Show
- "You and Me", by The Cockroaches from Fingertips
- "You and Me", by Connie Smith from Long Line of Heartaches
- "You and Me", by The Cranberries from Bury the Hatchet
- "You and Me", by Crash Vegas
- "You & Me", by Easyworld from This Is Where I Stand
- "You and Me", by Ed Roland from Anniversary
- "You and Me", by Enchantment from Soft Lights, Sweet Music
- "You and Me", by Frost
- "You and Me", by Go from Go Too
- "You and Me", by Gustaf Spetz
- "You and Me", by J-Kwon from Hood Hop
- "You and Me", by James Brown from I'm Real
- "You & Me", by James TW
- "You and Me", by Jeanie Tracy from Me and You
- "You and Me", by Jimmy Rankin from Song Dog
- "You and Me", by Joe Pass from Simplicity
- "You and Me", by John Cale from Helen of Troy
- "You and Me", by Johnny Cash from Gone Girl
- "You and Me", by June
- "U and Me", by Junior Senior from Say Hello, Wave Goodbye
- "You and Me", by Keef Hartley from Lancashire Hustler
- "You and Me", by Ken Block from Drift
- "You and Me", by Kenny Rogers with Dottie West, from Every Time Two Fools Collide
- "You & Me", by Laze & Royal featuring Myah Marie!
- "You and Me", by Leslie Cheung from Red
- "You and Me", by Lil Suzy from Back to Dance
- "You and Me", by Marlena Shaw from Just a Matter of Time
- "You & Me", by Marshmello
- "You and Me", by Mick Ronson from Heaven and Hull
- "You and Me", by Mike Harrison from Rainbow Rider
- "You and Me", by Modern Talking from Romantic Warriors
- "You And Me", by Mumzy Stranger from Mumzy MixTape
- "You and Me", by Musiq from Aijuswanaseing
- "You and Me", by Neil Young from Harvest Moon
- "You and Me", by Niall Horan from Flicker
- "You and Me", by the O'Jays from Family Reunion
- "You and Me", by Ohio Players from Ecstasy
- "You and Me", by One Night Only from Started a Fire
- "You and Me", by Parachute from The Way It Was
- "You and Me", by Patti LaBelle from It's Alright with Me
- "You and Me", by Patty Larkin from Perishable Fruit
- "You & Me", by Penny and the Quarters
- "You and Me", by Peter Allen from Not the Boy Next Door
- "You and Me", by Plain White T's from Every Second Counts
- "You and Me", by Roger Daltrey from Daltrey
- "You and Me", by Ronnie Dyson from The More You Do It
- "You and Me", by Robyne Dunn, Geoff Robertson & Kevin Bennett from the film Blinky Bill: The Mischievous Koala
- "You and Me", by Samantha Fox from Angel with an Attitude
- "You and Me", by Sandy Green
- "You and Me", by Sonny & Cher
- "You and Me", by Stevie Wonder from My Cherie Amour
- "You and Me", by the Stylistics from Round 2
- "You and Me", by T-Pain, an unreleased song from Rappa Ternt Sanga
- "You & Me", by Tally Hall from Good & Evil
- "You and Me", by Tessanne Chin from In Between Words
- "You and Me", by Tiffany from the film Jetsons: The Movie
- "You and Me", by Tom Petty from The Last DJ
- "U & Me", by Trina from Diamond Princess
- "You and Me", by Trio Töykeät from Wake
- "You and Me", by UFO from Making Contact
- "You and Me", by Vega 4 from You and Others
- "You and Me", by Vengaboys from The Party Album
- "You and Me", by the Veronicas from their eponymous album
- "You and Me", by the Verve from the single "This Is Music"
- "You and Me", by Wayne Brady from A Long Time Coming
- "You 'N' Me", by Whitesnake from Lovehunter
- "You and Me", by You+Me from Rose ave.
- "You and Me", by Zakir Hussain from Making Music
- "You and Me", from the film Victor/Victoria
- "You and Me (But Mostly Me)", from the musical The Book of Mormon
- "You and Me (In My Pocket)", by Milow
- "You and Me (Less than Zero)", by Danzig from Less than Zero soundtrack
- "You and Me (Voce e Eu)", by Lalo Schifrin from Piano, Strings and Bossa Nova
- "You and Me (We Wanted It All)", by Christian Bautista and Rachelle Ann Go
- "You and Me (We Wanted It All)", by Frank Sinatra from Trilogy: Past Present Future
- "You and Me", from the film Descendants 2
- "You and Me, Me and You", by Nella and Trinket from Nella the Princess Knight
- "You ＆ Me Song", by Kishidan (10th single)

== Theatre ==
- You and Me (Peking opera), 2013, production directed by Zhang Yimou

== See also ==
- Between You and Me (disambiguation)
- Just Between You and Me (disambiguation)
- Me and You (disambiguation)
- You and I (disambiguation)
- Tú y Yo (disambiguation)
- Hum Tum (disambiguation)
- You, Me and Him (disambiguation)
