= Rakim discography =

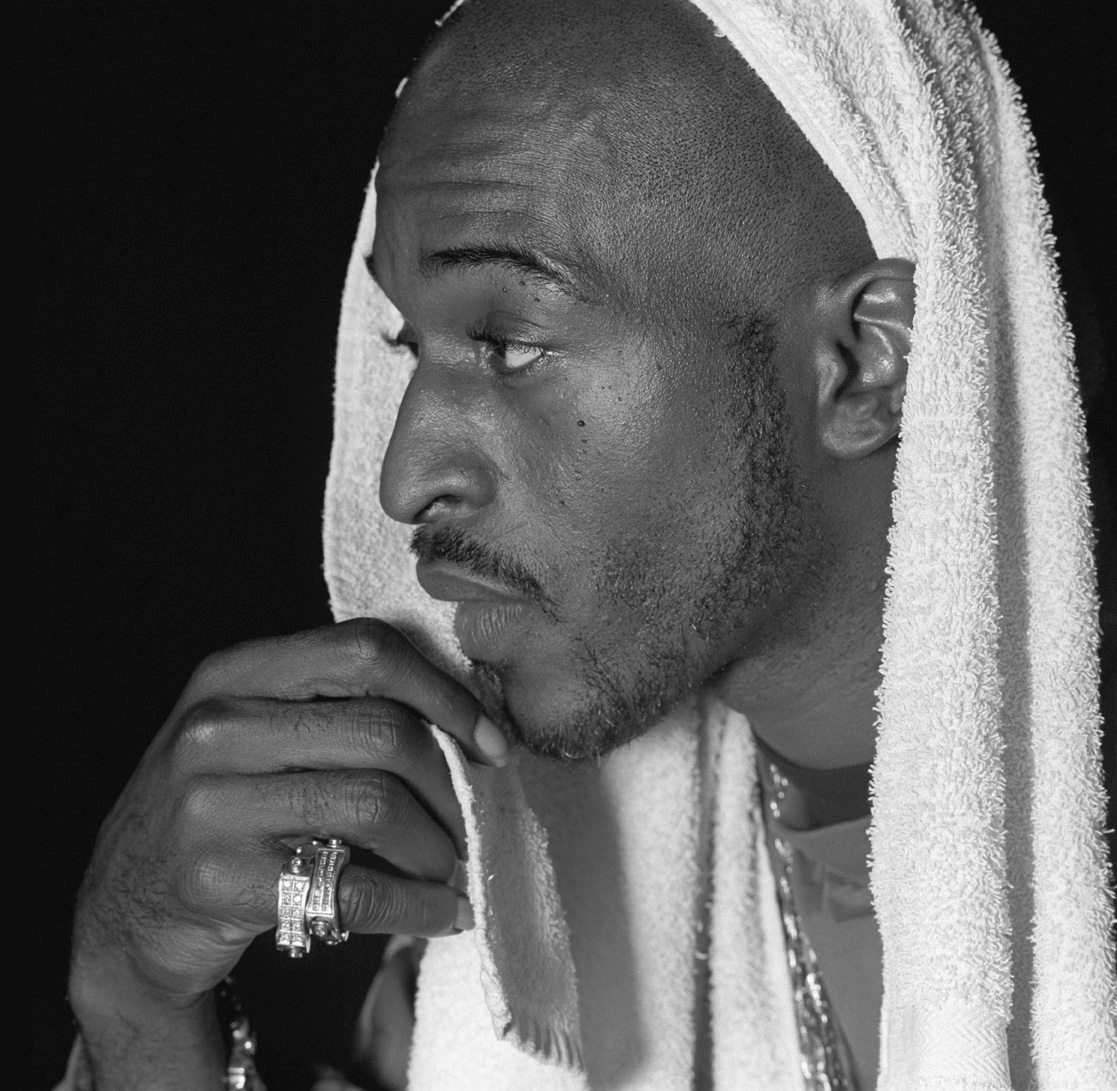
- Rakim in 1998
- Studio albums: 4
- Compilation albums: 1
- Singles: 15
- Music videos: 2

The discography of American rapper Rakim, as a solo artist, composed of four studio albums and one compilation album and fifteen singles (including 10 as a solo artist).

== Studio albums ==
List of studio albums, with selected chart positions
Title	Album details	Peak chart positions					Certifications
Title	Album details	US	US R&B	NL	UK	UK R&B	Certifications
The 18th Letter	Released: November 4, 1997; Label: Universal; Format: CD, CS, LP	4	1	57	72	8	RIAA: Gold
The Master	Released: November 30, 1999; Label: Universal; Format: CD, CS, LP	72	7	—	—	38	
The Seventh Seal	Released: November 17, 2009; Label: SMC Recordings; Format: CD, LP	67	9	—	—	—	
G.O.D.'s Network: Reb7rth	Released: July 26, 2024; Label: RRC Music; Format: CD, CS, LP	—	—	—	—	—	
The Re-Up	Released: August 29, 2025; Label: Holy Toledo, Compound Interest; Format: CD, LP	—	—	—	—	—	
"—" denotes a recording that did not chart or was not released in that territory.

== Compilations ==
List of compilation albums
Title	Album details	Peak chart positions
Title	Album details	US R&B
The Archive: Live, Lost & Found	Released: March 4, 2008; Label: Fast Life Music; Format: CD	99

== Collaborations ==
List of compilation albums
Title	Album details	Peak chart positions
Title	Album details	US R&B
The Godbody LP (with Kurupt and Masta Killa)	Released: September 18, 2026; Label: Holy Toledo Productions, DMG, Compound Interest; Format: digital download	

== Solo singles ==
List of singles as a solo artist with selected chart positions, showing year released and album name
Title	Year	Peak chart positions						Album
Title	Year	US R&B/ HH	US Rap	NL	UK	UK Dance	UK R&B	Album
"Heat It Up"	1993	92	24	—	—	—	—	Gunmen (Music from the Original Motion Picture Soundtrack)
"Guess Who's Back"	1997	—	—	47	32	1	5	The 18th Letter
"Stay a While"	1998	—	—	—	53	11	17	The 18th Letter
"When I B on the Mic"	1999	—	20	—	—	—	—	The Master
"It's Nothing"	2008	—	—	—	—	—	—	The Archive: Live, Lost & Found
"Holy Are U"	2009	—	—	—	—	—	—	The Seventh Seal
"Walk These Streets" (featuring Maino and Tracey Horton)	2009	—	—	—	—	—	—	The Seventh Seal
"Euphoria" (featuring Busta Rhymes, Jadakiss, Styles P and DJ Cocoa Chanelle)	2010	—	—	—	—	—	—	The Seventh Seal
"Don't Call Me" (with DMX, Shontelle and Aleks D.)	2013	—	—	—	—	—	—	—
"Walk" (with Orion Peace)	2016	—	—	—	—	—	—	—
"BE ILL" (with Kurupt & Masta Killa)	2024	—	—	—	—	—	—	G.O.Ds NETWORK - REB7RTH
"—" denotes a recording that did not chart or was not released in that territory.

=== Featured singles ===
List of singles as a featured artist with selected chart positions, showing year released and album name
Title	Year	Peak chart positions			Album
Title	Year	US	US Rap	UK	Album
"Contribution" (Mica Paris)	1990	`	`	`	Contribution
"You're Not Around (Remix)" (Deja Gruv)	1996	`	`	`	Love Jonz
"Hoodlum" (Mobb Deep & Big Noyd)	1997	—	29	—	Music Inspired by the Motion Picture Hoodlum
"Off the Hook (D-Dot Remix)" (Jody Watley)	1998	`	`	`	Flower
"Metaforce" (Art of Noise)	1999	—	—	53	The Seduction of Claude Debussy
"Addictive" (Truth Hurts)	2002	9	—	3	Truthfully Speaking
"What's Wrong" (Marco Polo)	2013	—	—	—	Newport Authority 2
"Guilty All the Same" (Linkin Park)	2014	117	—	138	The Hunting Party
"Wonders" (Michael Patrick Kelly)	2022	`	`	`	B.O.A.T.S (Extended Version)
"Thank You New York Knicks" (Busta Rhymes feat. Rakim, Styles P, Dave East)	2025	`	`	`	—
"Hallelujah" (Mic King)	2026	`	`	`	—
"—" denotes a recording that did not chart or was not released in that territory.

== Guest appearances ==
List of non-single guest appearances, with other performing artists, showing year released and album name
Title	Year	Other artist(s)	Album
"Kick in the Head"	1992	Al B. Sure!	Sexy Versus
"Murderer (Jeep Version)"	1993	Barrington Levy	Barrington
"Shades of Black"	1995	—N/a	Pump Ya Fist (Hip Hop Inspired by the Black Panthers)
"I'll Get Mine (Remix)"	1995	Soultry	—N/a
"Game of Death"	1996	Shaquille O'Neal	You Can't Stop the Reign
"Buffalo Gals (Back to Skool) [Remix]"	1998	Malcolm McLaren	Buffalo Gals Back to Skool
"Take the Train"	1998	Danny Saber	The Rugrats Movie: Music from the Motion Picture
"The Militia (Remix)"	1998	Gang Starr, WC	Belly (Original Motion Picture Soundtrack) / Full Clip: A Decade of Gang Starr
"Concrete Jungle"	1999	Bob Marley	Chant Down Babylon
"Rapt: In the Evening Air"	1999	Art of Noise	The Seduction of Claude Debussy
"Metaphor on the Floor"	1999	Art of Noise	The Seduction of Claude Debussy
"I'll Buss 'Em U Punish 'Em"	2000	Canibus	2000 B.C. (Before Can-I-Bus)
"Once Upon a Rhyme in Japan"	2000	Nigo	Shadow of the Ape Sounds
"I Am"	2001	G. Dep, Kool G Rap	Child of the Ghetto
"A Cold Feeling"	2002	Ayatollah	N/A
"R.A.K.I.M."	2002	—N/a	8 Mile: Music from and Inspired by the Motion Picture
"The Watcher 2"	2002	Jay-Z, Dr. Dre	The Blueprint²: The Gift & the Curse
"Streets of New York"	2003	Alicia Keys, Nas	The Diary of Alicia Keys
"Game of Life"	2005	Eddie Powell, Ice-T	Slippin’: 10 Years With the Bloods (soundtrack)
"Getting Up Anthem"	2006	Talib Kweli	Marc Ecko's Getting Up: Contents Under Pressure
"You Know the Deal"	2006	Lloyd Banks	Rotten Apple
"Let the Rhythm Hit 'Em 2007"	2007	Z-Trip, Chevelle	All-Pro Football 2K8
"Intro"	2008	—N/a	Adventures in Emceein
"Guerilla"	2009	Azad	Assassin
"Monster" (English Version)	2009	Drunken Tiger, Rakaa Iriscience	Feel gHood Muzik: The 8th Wonder
"King Tut"	2011	Swizz Beatz	Monster Mondays Vol. 1
"Cur$ed (What's Wrong Remix)"	2013	Marco Polo, Reggie B.	Newport Authority 2
"The Paragraph Chemist"	2013	The White Shadow	Nightmare Concert
"What's Good"	2016	georgios lazakis	Wise After the Life Story
"So Unjust"	2016	Stephen Marley, Kardinal Offishall	Revelation Pt. 2 – The Fruit of Life
"King's Paradise"	2018	Ali Shaheed Mohammed, Adrian Younge	Luke Cage: Season 2 Soundtrack
"E.L.E. 2 Intro"	2020	Busta Rhymes, Chris Rock, Pete Rock	Extinction Level Event 2: The Wrath of God
"Black Messiah"	2021	—N/a	Judas and the Black Messiah: The Inspired Album
