= You and I =

You and I may refer to:

== Film, television and theatre ==
- You and I (1938 film), a German film
- You and I (2008 film), an English/Russian film starring Mischa Barton and t.A.T.u
- You and I (2020 film), an Indonesian documentary film
- Jung Jae-hyung & Lee Hyo-ri's You and I, a South Korean music television program
- You and I (1923 play), originally named The Jilts by Philip Barry

== Music ==
=== Albums ===
- You & I (Cut Off Your Hands album), 2008
- You and I (Jeff Buckley album), 2016
- You and I (O'Bryan album), 1983
- You & I (The Pierces album), 2011
- You and I (Teddy Pendergrass album), 1997
- You & I (Rita Ora album), 2023

=== Songs ===
- "Echo (You and I)" by Anggun
- "You & I" (Avant song)
- "You and I" (Black Ivory song)
- "You and I" (Celine Dion song)
- "You and I" (Chess song)
- "You and I" (Dennis Wilson song)
- "You and I" (Eddie Rabbitt and Crystal Gayle song)
- "You & I" (Graham Coxon song)
- "You & I" (IU song)
- "You and I" (Kenny Rogers song)
- "You and I" (Lady Gaga song)
- "You and I" (Medina song)
- "You & I" (One Direction song)
- "You and I" (Rick James song)
- "You and I" (Scorpions song)
- "You and I" (Will Young song)
- "You & I (Nobody in the World)", by John Legend
- "You and I (We Can Conquer the World)", by Stevie Wonder, covered by Michael Bublé, also covered by George Michael as "You and I"
- "You and I", by Aaliyah Qureishi from the Indian television series Bandish Bandits
- "You and I", by Ace of Base from The Bridge
- "You and I", by Anarbor from Free Your Mind
- "You and I", by Angela Aki from Blue
- "You and I", by Anjulie
- "You and I", by Anouk from Paradise and Back Again
- "You and I", by APO Hiking Society from Made in the Philippines
- "You and I", by Arctic Monkeys, B-side of the single "Black Treacle"
- "You and I", by Ayyan
- "You & I", by Azu from Two of Us
- "You and I", by Bad Boys Blue from Heart & Soul
- "You and I", by Bing Crosby from St. Valentine's Day
- "You and I", by Bobby Vinton, B-side of the single "Roses Are Red (My Love)"
- "You and I", by Brotherhood of Man from We're the Brotherhood of Man
- "You and I", by Bru-C and Simula
- "You and I", by Budgie from Budgie
- "You and I", by Bury Tomorrow from Portraits
- "You and I", by Chasen from Shine Through the Stars
- "You and I", by the Copyrights from We Didn't Come Here to Die
- "You and I", by Chung Dong-ha
- "You and I", by Cliff Richard from Me and My Shadows
- "You & I", by Corey Hart from Jade
- "You & I", by Crystal Fighters from Cave Rave
- "You and I", by D4vd from Petals to Thorns
- "You and I", by Damien Leith from Chapter Seven
- "You and I", by David Oliver from Jamerican Man
- "You and I", by Delegation (band)
- "You and I", by Dottie West from High Times
- "You and I", by Drag from The Way Out
- "You and I", by Dreamcatcher
- "You and I", by the Duhks from The Duhks
- "You and I", by Earth, Wind & Fire from I Am
- "You and I", by Earth, Wind & Fire from Touch the World
- "You and I", by Emma Paki from Oxygen of Love
- "You and I", by Enrique Iglesias from Sex and Love
- "You and I", by Estelle from All of Me
- "You and I", by Field Music from Field Music (Measure)
- "You & I", by Fightstar from One Day Son, This Will All Be Yours
- "You and I", by the Flaws
- "You and I, Part I", by Fleetwood Mac, B-side of the single "Big Love"
- "You and I, Part II", by Fleetwood Mac from Tango in the Night
- "You and I", by Five from 5ive
- "You and I", by Foy Vance and Bonnie Raitt from Joy of Nothing
- "You and I", by the Friends of Distinction from Whatever
- "You and I", by Future of Forestry from Twilight
- "You and I", by Garou from Piece of My Soul
- "You & I", by G Flip
- "You and I", by Half Japanese from Perfect
- "You and I", by Ingrid Michaelson from Be OK
- "You and I", by Itzy from Motto
- "You & I", by Iz*One from Bloom*Iz
- "You and I", by Jack Lucien from New 80s Musik
- "You and I", by James Skelly & The Intenders from Love Undercover
- "You and I", by Jeff Buckley from Sketches for My Sweetheart the Drunk
- "You and I", by Jimmy Eat World from Invented
- "You and I", by J.K.
- "You and I", by Joe Budden from No Love Lost
- "You and I", by Joe Cocker from Organic
- "You and I", by Johnny Bristol
- "You and I", by Kate Ceberano from Kensal Road
- "You and I", by Ken Dodd, B-side of the single "Tears"
- "You & I", by Krypteria from In Medias Res
- "You & I", by Local Natives
- "You and I", by the MacDonald Brothers from The World Outside
- "You and I", by Madleen Kane
- "You and I", by Marien Baker and Soraya Arnelas
- "You and I", by Marion Raven from Songs from a Blackbird
- "You and I", by Matt Bianco from Another Time Another Place
- "You and I", by the Monkees, written by Davy Jones and Bill Chadwick, from Instant Replay (1969)
- "You and I", by the Monkees, written by Micky Dolenz and Davy Jones, from Justus (1996)
- "You and I", by Morissette from Morissette
- "You and I", by Nantucket from The Unreleased "D.C. Tapes"
- "You and I", by Nora Aunor from Queen of Songs
- "You and I", by Park Bom
- "You and I", by Pat McGee Band from Save Me
- "You and I", by Pete Shelley from XL1
- "You and I", by Petula Clark, written by Leslie Bricusse, from the soundtrack for the 1969 film Goodbye, Mr. Chips
- "You and I", by PVRIS
- "You and I", by Queen from A Day at the Races
- "You and I", by Rakim from The Seventh Seal
- "You and I", by Ray Charles and Betty Carter from Ray Charles and Betty Carter
- "You and I", by Roseanna Vitro from The Time of My Life: Roseanna Vitro Sings the Songs of Steve Allen
- "You and I", by Saigon Kick, included on Moments from the Fringe
- "You and I", by Sandra from The Long Play
- "You and I", by Santana from Santana IV
- "You and I", by Seth MacFarlane from Music Is Better Than Words
- "You and I", by Shane & Shane from Clean
- "You and I", by Silver Apples from Contact
- "You and I", by Stephanie Mills from What Cha' Gonna Do with My Lovin'
- "You & I", by the Struts from Everybody Wants
- "You and I", by Switch from This Is My Dream
- "You and I", by t.A.T.u. from Vesyolye Ulybki
- "You and I", by Ultrabeat from The Weekend Has Landed
- "You and I", by Unisonic from Light of Dawn
- "You and I", by Washed Out featuring Caroline Polachek from Within and Without
- "You and I", by Wendy & Lisa from White Flags of Winter Chimneys
- "You and I", by Wilco from Wilco (The Album)
- "You and I", by Xonia
- "You and I", by Yoko Ono from Starpeace
- "You and I", from the musical Chess
- "You and I (Are You Lonely)", by Elkie Brooks from Pearls III (Close to the Edge)
- "You and I (Ba-Ba-Ba)", by the Jayhawks from Tomorrow the Green Grass
- "You & I (Forever)", by Jessie Ware from Tough Love
- "You and I (Have a Right to Cry)", by Lou Christie
- "You and I (Keep Holding On)", by Billie Ray Martin
- "You and I (Voce E Eu)", by Jon Hendricks from ¡Salud! João Gilberto, Originator of the Bossa Nova
- "You and I (When We Were Young)", by Strawbs from Ghosts
- "You and I"/"Cabbage", by Mass
- "Dirimu dan Diriku" (Indonesian for "You and I"), by Chrisye from Percik Pesona
- "Du und ich" (German for "You and I"), by Schnuffel from Winterwunderland
- "Tu și eu" (Romanian for "You and I"), by Inna from the single "Crazy Sexy Wild"
- "Ты и я" (Russian for "You and I"), by Dmitry Malikov

=== Performers ===
- You and I, an American screamo band formerly signed to Level Plane Records

== See also ==
- You and Me (disambiguation)
- Tú y Yo (disambiguation) (Spanish for "You and I")
- Hum Tum (disambiguation) ("You and I" in Indic languages)
- You Am I, an Australian alternative rock band
- "You and I Both", a song by Jason Mraz
- U&I (disambiguation)
- U and I: A True Story, a book by Nicholson Baker
