= Ek Main Aur Ek Tu =

Ek Main Aur Ek Tu (lit. 'One Me and One You' in Hindi) may refer to:

- Ek Main Aur Ek Tu (1986 film), an Indian Hindi-language film directed by Ravi Tandon
- Ek Main Aur Ekk Tu, a 2012 Indian Hindi-language romantic comedy film directed by Shakun Batra
  - Ek Main Aur Ekk Tu (soundtrack), its soundtrack by Amit Trivedi

== See also ==
- Me and You (disambiguation)
