= Between You and Me =

Between You and Me may refer to:

== Music ==
=== Artists ===
- Between You & Me (band), an Australian pop-punk band formed in 2016

=== Albums ===
- Between You and Me (San Cisco album), 2020
- Between You and Me (Flyte album), 2025
- Between You and Me, a 2007 album by Fabienne Delsol
- Between You & Me, a 2016 EP by Belmont
- Starp tevi un mani (transl. Between You and Me), a 2003 album by Z-Scars

=== Songs ===
- "Between You and Me" (DC Talk song), released in 1996
- "Between You and Me", a song by Graham Parker from the album Howlin' Wind, 1976
- "Between You and Me", a song by Jean-Luc Ponty from the album Aurora, 1976
- "Between You and Me", a song by Johnny Hates Jazz from the album Tall Stories, 1991
- "Between You and Me", a song by the Ataris from the album Look Forward to Failure, 1998
- "Between You and Me", a song by Marillion from the album Anoraknophobia, 2001
- "Between You and Me", a song by Hilary Duff from the album Dignity, 2007
- "Between You and Me", a 2010 song by the Raw Men Empire
- "Between You and Me", a song by Suffrajett
- "Between You & Me" (Betty Who song), released in 2018
- "Between You & Me", a song by ABC from the album How to Be a ... Zillionaire!, 1985
- "Between You & Me", a song by D.A.D. from the album Soft Dogs, 2002

== Film ==
- Between You and Me (Dangsingwa na sa-i-e), a 1971 South Korean film

== Literature ==
- Between You and Me, a 1919 book by Harry Lauder
- Between You and Me: A Heartfelt Memoir on Learning, Loving, and Living, a 1989 autobiographical book by Pearl Bailey
- Between You and Me: A Memoir, a 2005 autobiographical book by Mike Wallace
- Between You & Me: Confessions of a Comma Queen, a 2015 book by Mary Norris
- Between You and Me: Queer Disclosures in the New York Art World, a book by Gavin Butt

== See also ==
- Between you and I
- Just Between You and Me (disambiguation)
- Just Between Us (disambiguation)
