= Affairs of the Heart =

Affairs of the Heart may refer to:

== Film ==
- Affairs of the Heart (film), a 2017 Nigerian film

== Literature ==
- Amores (Lucian), or Affairs of the Heart, a Greek dialogue traditionally attributed to Lucian
- Affairs of the Heart (1900), a novel anthology by English author Violet Hunt
- Affairs of the Heart (1949), a 1949 book by English writer Malcolm Muggeridge

== Music ==
- Affairs of the Heart, a record label used by band Flare Acoustic Arts League
- Affairs of the Heart, a 1980s new wave synthpop trio in which Steve Street was a member
- Affairs of the Heart (album), a 1991 studio album by Jody Watley
- Affairs of the Heart, a 1997 concerto composed by Marjan Mozetich
- Affairs of the Heart, a 2007 album by Sandy Green

=== Songs ===
- "Affairs of the Heart", a song by World Saxophone Quartet from the 1979 album Revue
- "Affairs of the Heart", a song by John Wesley Harding from the 1990 album Here Comes the Groom
- "Affairs of the Heart", by Fleetwood Mac from the 1990 album Behind the Mask
- "Affairs of the Heart", a song by Emerson, Lake & Palmer from the 1992 album Black Moon
- "Affairs of the Heart", a song by Buju Banton from the 2009 dancehall album Rasta Got Soul
- "Affairs of the Heart", a 2012 reggae single recorded by Damian Marley

== Television ==
- Affairs of the Heart (1974 TV series), a 1974 British TV series
- Affairs of the Heart (TV series), a 1985 English sitcom
- "Affairs of the Heart" (1983), an episode of American sitcom Happy Days
- "Affairs of the Heart", a 1986 episode of the American sitcom Cheers
- "Affairs of the Heart", a 1987 episode of the Australian sitcom Hey Dad..!
- "Affairs of the Heart", a 1997 episode of the British police drama Heartbeat
- "Affairs of the Heart", a 2008 episode of Philippene supernatural drama series E.S.P.
- "Affairs of the Heart", a 2008 episode of Estonian drama miniseries Tuulepealne maa
