= Sandy Green =

Sandy Green may refer to:

- Sandy Green (mathematician) (1926–2014), English mathematician
- Sandy Green (singer) (born 1987), English singer and songwriter
