= Speak & Spell =

Speak & Spell may refer to:

- Speak & Spell (toy), an educational toy made by Texas Instruments
- Speak & Spell (album), a 1981 album by Depeche Mode

== See also ==
- Speak n Spell Music, a company in the music industry in Australia and New Zealand
