= Just Between You and Me =

Just Between You and Me may refer to:

== Albums ==
- Just Between You and Me (The Kinleys album) or the title song (see below), 1997
- Just Between You and Me (Porter Wagoner and Dolly Parton album), 1968
  - Just Between You and Me: The Complete Recordings, 1967–1976, a box set by Wagoner and Parton, 2014

== Songs ==
- "Just Between You and Me" (April Wine song), 1981
- "Just Between You and Me" (Charley Pride song), 1966
- "Just Between You and Me" (The Chordettes song), 1957
- "Just Between You and Me" (The Kinleys song), 1997
- "Just Between You and Me" (Lou Gramm song), 1989

== See also ==
- Between You and Me (disambiguation)
- Just Between Us (disambiguation)
