= Me and You =

Me and You or Me & U may refer to:

== Music ==
- Me and You (band), a Jamaican reggae duo

=== Albums ===
- Me and You (Big Scary album), 2022
- Me and You (Count Basie album), 1983
- Me and You (Jeanie Tracy album), or the title song, 1982
- Me and You (Kenny Chesney album), or the title song (see below), 1996
- Me and You (VAST album), 2009
- Me and You, by Snowglobe, 2008

=== Songs ===
- "Me and You" (Alexia song), 1995
- "Me and You" (Camouflage song), 2003
- "Me and You" (Egg Hunt song), 1986
- "Me and You" (Emtee song), 2017
- "Me and You" (Kenny Chesney song), 1995
- "Me & You" (Nero song), 2011
- "Me & U" (Cassie song), 2006
- "Me & U" (Tems song), 2023
- "Me + You", by Monica, 2019
- "Me and You", by Archive from Noise
- "Me & You", by Belle Perez
- "Me & U", by Big Ed from Special Forces
- "Me & You", by Bracket, 2011
- "Me & U", by Cali Swag District from The Kickback
- "Me & You", by Ceres from We Are a Team
- "Me & You", by Diana Vickers from Songs from the Tainted Cherry Tree
- "Me & U", by Flo Rida from Mail on Sunday
- "ME+U", by f(x) from Nu ABO
- "Me and You", by Jake Bugg from Shangri La
- "Me and U", by Kandi Burruss from Kandi Koated
- "Me and You", by Laura Marano from Austin & Ally: Turn It Up
- "Me & You", by Lumidee from Almost Famous
- "Me and You", by Mondo Generator from A Drug Problem That Never Existed
- "Me and U", by Montell Jordan from Let It Rain
- "Me & You", by Nadine Lustre from Nadine Lustre
- "Me and You", by Nolwenn Leroy from Le Cheshire Cat et moi
- "Me & U", by PnB Rock from TrapStar Turnt PopStar
- "Me and You", by Poco from Indian Summer
- "Me and You", by Ringo Starr from Choose Love
- "Me and You", by She & Him from Volume Two
- "Me and You", by Slow Club
- "Me & You", by Stereo Skyline from Stuck on Repeat
- "Me + You", by Super Cruel
- "Me and You", by Tony! Toni! Toné! from the Boyz n the Hood film soundtrack
- "Me and You", by Tyler James Williams and Coco Jones from the Let It Shine film soundtrack
- "Main Aur Tu" (lit. 'Me and You'), by Shashwat Sachdev, Jasmine Sandlas and Reble from the Dhurandhar: The Revenge soundtrack

== Other uses ==
- Me and You (novel) (Io e te), a 2010 novel by Niccolò Ammaniti
- Me and You (film) (Io e te), a 2012 Italian film directed by Bernardo Bertolucci, based on Ammaniti's novel

== See also ==
- You and Me (disambiguation)
- Hum Tum (disambiguation) ("Me and You" in Indic languages)
- Ek Main Aur Ek Tu (disambiguation) ("One Me and One You" in Indic languages)
- Me, You and Him, British television show
