= Hum Tum Aur Woh =

Hum Tum Aur Woh (lit. 'You, Me and Him') may refer to:

- Hum Tum Aur Woh (1938 film), a Hindi/Urdu social drama film directed by Mehboob Khan
- Hum Tum Aur Woh (1971 film), a Bollywood drama directed by Shiv Kumar

== See also ==
- Hum Tum (disambiguation)
- Pati Patni Aur Woh (disambiguation)
- You, Me and Him (disambiguation)
