= U&I =

U&I (e.g. You and I) may refer to:

- U&I (album), by Leila, 2012
- "U&I" (song), by Ailee, 2013
- "U&I", a song by Jodeci from their album Forever My Lady
- "Ü&I", a song by Lykke Li from her album Eyeye
- "U&I: Dil Se Mile Dil", a song by KK and Pritam from the 2006 Indian film Naksha
  - "U&I", a different version of the song by Labh Janjua and Rana Mazumder
- U and I: A True Story, a 1991 book by Nicholson Baker
- Utah-Idaho Sugar Company, an American sugar beet processing company
- Upin & Ipin, a Malaysian TV Series

== See also ==
- You and I (disambiguation)
