= Tú y Yo =

Tú y Yo may refer to:

- Tú y yo (TV series), 1996 Mexican telenovela produced by Emilio Larrosa
- Tú y Yo (David Bisbal album), 2014 album
- Tú y Yo (Marcos Witt album), 1991 album
- "Tú y Yo" (Raymix and Paulina Rubio song), 2020
- "Tú y Yo" (Thalía song), 2002
- "Tú y Yo", a 1992 song by Ana Gabriel from the album Silueta
- "Tu y Yo", a 2019 song by Anitta from the album Kisses
- "Tú y Yo", a 2010 song by Enrique Iglesias from the album Euphoria
- "Tú y Yo", a 2003 song by La Oreja de Van Gogh from the album Lo Que te Conté Mientras te Hacías la Dormida
- "Tú y Yo", a 1993 song by Luis Miguel from the album Aries
- "Tu y Yo", a 2012 song by Lylloo and Matt Houston
- "Tú y Yo", a 1996 song by Paulina Rubio from the album Planeta Paulina
- "Tú y Yo", a 2006 song by Paulina Rubio from the album Ananda
- "Tú y Yo", a 2010 song by Prince Royce from the album Prince Royce
- "Tú y Yo", a 2013 song by Maite Perroni from the album Eclipse de Luna
- "Tú y Yo", a 2024 song by Khea and Emilia Mernes

== See also ==
- You and I (disambiguation)
- You and Me (disambiguation)
