= Hum Tum =

Hum Tum (lit. 'Me and You') may refer to the following:

- Hum Tum (film), 2004 Indian Hindi-language romantic comedy film
- Hum Tum (album), 1995 album by Pakistani band Vital Signs
- Hum Tum (2010 TV series), 2010 Pakistani television serial
- Hum Tum (2022 TV series), 2022 Pakistani Ramadan special

== See also ==
- Me and You (disambiguation)
- You and Me (disambiguation)
- You and I (disambiguation)
- Hum Tum Aur Woh (disambiguation)
- "Hum Tum Ek Kamre Mein Band Ho", a song by Lata Mangeshkar and Shailendra Singh from the 1973 Indian film Bobby
- Hum Tum Aur Ghost, 2010 Indian Hindi supernatural comedy-drama film
- Hum Tum Aur Mom, a 2005 Indian film
- Hum Tum Aur Quarantine, Indian comedy television show
- Hum Tum Pe Marte Hain, a 1999 Indian Hindi-language romantic comedy film
- Hum Tum Shabana, a 2011 Indian romantic comedy film
