= Cut Off Your Hands =

New Zealand post-punk band

- Cut Off Your Hands performing at Falls Festival, 2007

Background information
- Also known as: Shaky Hands (until 2006)
- Origin: Auckland, New Zealand
- Genres: Indie rock, post-punk
- Years active: 2006–2020
- Labels: French Kiss; Speak N Spell; Pop That; Super Fuzz
- Past members: Nick Johnston; Phil Hadfield; Brent Harris; Michael Ramirez; Elroy Finn; Jonathan Lee
- Website: cutoffyourhands.com

Cut Off Your Hands (COYH) was a post-punk band from New Zealand. Formed by former members of Auckland post-punk act Nova Echo, Cut Off Your Hands released a number of recordings on the labels Speak n Spell, SIXSEVENINE, and French Kiss Records. In 2020, the band announced its final shows and the release of their third album HLLH.

== Background ==
Cut Off Your Hands formed in Auckland in 2006 under the name Shaky Hands. Vocalist Nick Johnston, guitarist Michael Ramirez, bassist Philip Hadfield and drummer Brent Harris were previously in Auckland post-punk act Nova Echo along with Djeisan Suskov. When that band broke up, Johnston formed a new band called Shaky Hands and enlisted Hadfield, Harris and Ramirez. Owing to a Portland band of the same name they changed their name to Cut Off Your Hands (the original title of their debut EP). The name change saw them lose a pre-booked performance on a children's show in the process.

The band released a number of EPs and in 2008 released their debut album You & I which reached number 21 on the New Zealand music charts and received generally favourable reviews internationally.

In 2009, Michael Ramirez left the band, being replaced by Jonathan Lee. Drummer Brent Harris was forced to take leave from the band due to hearing loss, being replaced by Elroy Finn so that touring could continue in 2009. Harris subsequently rejoined the band at a later date.

In 2011, the band released their follow-up album Hollow. Reception was generally favourable, with critics praising their sound maturing while retaining the energy of their debut.

In 2020, the band announced the release of their third album, named HLLH. At the same time, they announced they would be playing their final concerts in October 2020.

== Band members ==
- Nick Johnston – lead vocals, guitar
- Philip Hadfield – bass, backing vocals
- Brent Harris – drums, backing vocals
- Michael Ramirez – guitar, backing vocals (2006–2009)
- Elroy Finn – drums (2009)
- Jonathan Lee – guitar, backing vocals (2009–2018)
- Priya Sami – backing vocals and a Kew stick guitar (2020)
- Soane Tui – backing vocals and percussion on HLLH (2020)
- Elisapeta Heta – backing vocals on HLLH (2020)

== Discography ==
=== Albums ===
- You & I (2008) #21 NZ
- Hollow (2011)
- HLLH (2020)

=== EPs ===
- Shaky Hands (August 2006, October 2007 in North America)
- Blue on Blue (July 2007)
- Happy as Can Be (October 2008)
- Live at Lime presents Cut Off Your Hands (November 2008; digital download)

=== Singles ===
- "Still Fond/Closed Eyes" (8 October 2007; 7", digital download)
- "Closed Eyes (Remix)" (12 November 2007; 12", digital download)
- "Oh Girl/Turn Cold" (January 2008; 7")
- "Expectations/The Witch (Sonics cover)" (18 August 2008; 7")
- "Happy as Can Be" (2008)
- "Turn Cold" (23 January 2009)
- "You Should Do Better" (2011)
- "Fooling No One" (2011)
- "Hollowed Out" (2011)
- "Hate Somebody" (15 November 2016, digital download)
- "Higher Lows and Lower Highs" (27 January 2017, digital download)
