= Pati Patni Aur Woh =

Pati Patni Aur Woh (transl. Husband, Wife and Her) may refer to:

- Pati Patni Aur Woh (1978 film), an Indian film directed by B. R. Chopra
- Pati Patni Aur Woh (2019 film), an Indian film, a remake of the 1978 film
- Pati Patni Aur Woh (TV series), a 2009 Indian reality television series

== See also ==
- Hum Tum Aur Woh (disambiguation)
- Pati Patni Aur Tawaif, a 1990 Indian film
- Main, Meri Patni Aur Woh, a 2005 Indian film
