= Between you and I =

Phrase

"Between you and I" is an English phrase that has drawn considerable interest from linguists, grammarians, and stylists. It is commonly used by style guides as a convenient label for a construction where the nominative/subjective form of pronouns is used for two pronouns joined by and in circumstances where the accusative/oblique case would be used for a single pronoun, typically following a preposition, but also as the object of a transitive verb. One frequently cited use of the phrase is in Shakespeare's The Merchant of Venice (1596–98). According to many style guides, the Shakespearian character who used the phrase should have written "between you and me". Use of this common construction has been called "a grammatical error of unsurpassable grossness", (Note: The characterization as "a grammatical error of unsurpassable grossness" is attributed by Bryan Garner to an unnamed "one commentator". Bill Bryson attributes it to John Simon, who apparently used the term in reference to Tennessee Williams's alleged use of "between he and I".) but whether it is (or was) in fact an error is a matter of debate.

== Use in literature ==
"Between you and I" occurs in act 3, scene 2, of The Merchant of Venice, in a letter written by Antonio, the titular character, to his friend Bassanio: "Sweet Bassanio, ... all debts are cleared between you and I if I might but see you at my death."

Writer and critic Henry Hitchings points to usage in William Congreve's The Double Dealer (1693) and in Mark Twain's letters. Otto Jespersen found similar examples ("pronouns or nouns plus I after a preposition", in Robert J. Menner's words) in Ben Jonson, John Bunyan, Charles Dickens, and Graham Greene, and Menner adds Noah Webster, Samuel Pepys, Thomas Middleton, and others. Writer Constance Hale notes that Ernest Hemingway frequently used pronouns this way: "Gertrude Stein and me are just like brothers."

Various critics have commented on Shakespeare's line. American writer Russell Baker, in his "Observer" column in The New York Times, considered it a grammatical error—"grammatically, of course, Shakespeare was wrong". He said Shakespeare probably "slipped accidentally": "My guess is that he was writing along rapidly, maybe at the end of the day when he was tired, was wishing he'd never come up with this Merchant of Venice idea, and eager to get over to the Mermaid Tavern for a beer with Jonson and Burbage". In a 1937 article in American Speech, Menner writes, "it is evident that the phrase you and I was often felt to be grammatically indivisible, perhaps of frequency, and that we cannot even be sure that 'between you and I' was originally hypercorrect in the Elizabethan age"; Menner does not say whether he believes the usage to be correct or incorrect.

Others do not accuse Shakespeare of grammatical incorrectness: sociologist Robert Nisbet criticizes "word snobs" who condemn the phrase, and lexicographer and OED editor Robert Burchfield says that what is incorrect for us was not necessarily incorrect for Shakespeare: "grammatical assumptions were different then", a view shared by philologist and grammarian Henry Sweet. But Bryan A. Garner, who writes on usage and (especially legal) language, writes that even if the phrase was not incorrect for Shakespeare, it is and should be considered incorrect now, citing linguist Randolph Quirk: "It is true that Shakespeare used both ['between you and I' as well as 'between you and me'], but that did not make it any more correct".

== Incorrectness and hypercorrection ==
The term hypercorrection, in this context, refers to grammatically incorrect usage, and is typically committed by speakers (or writers) who "overcorrect" what they think is a mistake and thereby make an error. Kenneth G. Wilson, author of The Columbia Guide to Standard American English (1993), says hypercorrections are "the new mistakes we make in the effort to avoid old ones" and cites "between you and I" as an example—better, he says, to say "between the two of us".

For the phrase to be considered an example of hypercorrection, it has to be considered grammatically incorrect in the first place. Grammarians and writers on style who judge the phrase this way include Paul Brians, the Oxford Dictionaries, and Grammar Girl: "it's just a rule that pronouns following prepositions in those phrases are always in the objective case." A BBC survey in the early 2000s found that listeners ranked "between you and I" first in "most annoying grammar mistakes". But many grammarians and linguists, including Steven Pinker, consider the phrase grammatically acceptable.

=== Supposed causes ===
The cause of this particular error is given by such authorities as a kind of trauma deriving from incorrect usage caused by "you" being both nominative and oblique and the awareness of the possible incorrectness of "me": "People make this mistake because they know it's not correct to say, for example, 'John and me went to the shops'. They know that the correct sentence would be 'John and I went to the shops'. But they then mistakenly assume that the words 'and me' should be replaced by 'and I' in all cases." In The Language Wars (2011), Hitchings gives a similar explanation, adding that for many speakers "you and I" seem to belong together. Kenneth Wilson makes the same point. That the problem typically occurs when two pronouns are used together is widely recognized: "these problems rarely arise when the pronoun [I] stands alone". James Cochrane, author of Between You and I: A Little Book of Bad English (2004), gives a similar explanation—in this case, "people's feeling some unease with a sentence like 'Me and Bill went out for beers'"; but Cochrane does not deem it a hypercorrection and suggests the phrase came about only "in the last twenty or so years". Linguist J. K. Chambers points out that the usage is not "a change in progress".

Chambers investigated the phrase (as well as the closely related "with you and I") in an analysis of the role of education in the grammaticality of English speakers, in this case from Canada. Data from ninth-graders and their parents indicated little regional variation, but a significant variation between children and their parents, showing children were more likely to pick the "correct" pronoun or, in technical terms, to show "accusative case concord with conjoined pronouns". Chambers's explanation is that the children are likely to have had better education than their parents, and a 2008 study of seven regions of Canada likewise showed that concord increased with education level. Chambers investigates a number of explanations, and accepts as one reason the mistake occurs the considerable distance between the preposition and the second pronoun.

=== Hypercorrection, contextual acceptability ===
More complex explanations than "trauma" or "unease" are provided by linguists and sociolinguists. Without expanding on the topic, Hitchings considers the phrase a very specific, class-oriented kind of hypercorrection, which he calls "hyperurbanism", which "involves avoiding what is believed to be a 'low' mistake and using a supposedly classier word or pronunciation, although in fact the result is nothing of the sort". A similar reason is given by Garner (pace Chambers), who says, "this grammatical error is committed almost exclusively by educated speakers trying a little too hard to sound refined but stumbling badly" and calls the phrase "appallingly common". The notion that educated people are prone to this error is shared by Grammar Girl, who says that Jessica Simpson can therefore be forgiven for the 2006 song "Between You and I". But according to legal scholar Patricia J. Williams, members of "the real upper class" recognize it immediately as substandard; she comments that such usage easily marks one as belonging to a lower class. Sociolinguist Gerard van Herk discusses "between you and I" and similar phrases with pronoun errors (which are all incorrect according to prescriptive linguists) in the context of social mobility.

One of the most notable linguists to accept the grammaticality of "between you and I" is Steven Pinker, though he still calls it a "hyper-corrected solecism". Pinker's argument, in short, is that individual elements in coordinates need not have the same number as the coordinate itself: "she and Jennifer are" has two singular coordinates, though the coordination itself is plural. The same, Pinker argues in The Language Instinct (1994), applies to case, citing a famous phrase used by Bill Clinton and criticized by William Safire: "So just because [Al Gore and I] is an object that requires object case, it does not mean that [I] is an object that requires object case. By the logic of grammar, the pronoun is free to have any case it wants". Writer Ben Yagoda, impressed by this argument, divides his thinking on the phrase's grammaticality into a pre-Pinker and a post-Pinker period, and Peter Brodie, in a special issue of The English Journal devoted to grammar and usage, is likewise persuaded: "he also reminds us that these rules are generally dictated by snobbery and conceived as mere shibboleths". In The War Against Grammar (2003), David D. Mulroy finds Pinker's argument unpersuasive but writes, "these are matters on which reasonable people can disagree".

According to linguist Joshua Fishman, in some circles the phrase is "considered to be perfectly OK even in print", while others accept it "only in some contexts", and yet others never accept it at all. Richard Redfern cites many examples of what is considered incorrect pronoun usage, many of which do not follow the "preposition + you and I" construction: "for he and I", "between he and Mr. Bittman". He argues that the "error" is widespread (Elizabeth II even committing it), and that it should become acceptable usage: "The rule asks native speakers of English to stifle their instinctive way of expressing themselves".

In its treatment of "coordinate nominatives" used where the accusative (oblique) case would be used in non-coordinate constructions, The Cambridge Grammar of the English Language differentiates different levels of acceptance depending on the pronouns used and their position in the coordinate construction. Thus a construction like "without you or I knowing anything about it" is "so common in speech and used by so broad a range of speakers that it has to be recognised as a variety of Standard English", while examples like "they've awarded he and his brother certificates of merit" and "return the key to you or she" are classified as grammatically incorrect hypercorrection.
