= Rakim (name) =

Rakim or Rakeem is an Arabic-language name. It may be influenced by Karim, Rahim, and Hakim.

It may refer to:

== In religion ==
- Al Rakim, a legendary dog that guarded the Seven Sleepers in Islam

== People with the given name ==
- Rakim Allen or PnB Rock (1991–2022), American rapper
- Rakim Cox (born 1991) Canadian football player
- Rakim Hollis (born 1980) American basketball player
- Rakim Jarrett (born 2001), American football player
- Rakim Mayers or ASAP Rocky (born 1988), American rapper
- Rakim Sanders (born 1989), American basketball player
- Rakeem Boyd (born 1998), American football player
- Rakeem Buckles (born 1990), American professional basketball player
- Rakeem Cato (born 1992), American football player
- Rakeem Christmas (born 1991), American basketball player
- Rakeem Nuñez-Roches (born 1993), Belizean-American football player

== People with the surname ==
- Mustafa Râkim, (1757–1826), Ottoman calligrapher
- Dionne Rakeem, British singer
- Amer Zaakaria Rakim, Bangsamoro Parliament member

== Fictional characters ==
- Rakeem Powell, NYPD Detective in James Patterson's Alex Cross novel Cross

== Others ==
- Rakim or Rakim Allah (born 1968), American rapper
- R.K.M & Ken-Y member José Nieves originally went by "Rakim" before changing it to avoid confusion with the rapper
- RZA, originally went by stagename Prince Rakeem, releasing the 1991 album Ooh I Love You Rakeem under that name
- Rekeem Harper, British footballer
- Rahkeem Cornwall, Antiguan cricketer
