= The Master (Rakim album) =

Studio album by Rakim
- Released: November 30, 1999
- Recorded: 1998–1999
- Genre: Hip hop
- Length: 62:07
- Labels: Universal; 542 082
- Producers: Rakim (also exec.); The 45 King; Amen-Ra; DJ Clark Kent; DJ Premier; Jaz-O; Naughty Shorts; Nick Wiz; Punch; TR Love; V.I.C.

Rakim chronology
The 18th Letter (1997)	The Master (1999)	The Archive: Live, Lost & Found (2008)

Singles from The Master
- 1. "When I B On Tha Mic" Released: December 14, 1999

The Master is the second studio album by American rapper Rakim, It was released on November 30, 1999, through Universal Records. It serves as the follow-up to Rakim's debut solo studio album, The 18th Letter (1997), and would be Rakim's last studio album for nearly a decade, until 2009's The Seventh Seal.

== Critical reception ==
Professional ratings
Review scores
Source	Rating
AllMusic	4.5/5 stars
The Independent	4/5 stars
Los Angeles Daily News	3/4 stars
Los Angeles Times	2/4 stars
NME	3.5/5 stars
Rolling Stone	3/5 stars
The Source	3.5/5 stars
USA Today	3.5/4 stars
Vibe	(mixed)
The Village Voice	(unfavorable)

The Master received generally positive to mixed reviews from music critics.

== Track listing ==
No.	Title	Writer(s)	Producer(s)	Length
1.	"Intro (The Master)"	William Griffin	Rakim	1:22
2.	"Flow Forever"	Griffin; Rodolfo Franklin; Robert Davis	DJ Clark Kent	4:11
3.	"When I B on tha Mic" (feat. DJ Premier)	Griffin; Christopher Martin	DJ Premier	3:42
4.	"Finest Ones" (feat. Clark Kent)	Griffin; Franklin; Yvette Davis	DJ Clark Kent	4:24
5.	"All Night Long"	Griffin; Michael Harper	Punch	4:27
6.	"State of Hip-Hop" (interlude)	Griffin	Rakim	0:39
7.	"Uplift"	Griffin; Ronald Lawrence; Victor Padilla	Amen-Ra; V.I.C.	3:09
8.	"I Know"	Griffin; Trevor Randolph; Benjamin Latimore; David Hinds	TR Love	4:07
9.	"It's the R"	Griffin; Franklin; Robert Byrd; Charles Bobbit; Louis Barrier; James Brown; Curtis Mayfield; James Hunter; Peter Phillips; Ricardo Brown	DJ Clark Kent	4:15
10.	"I'll Be There" (feat. Nneka Morton)	Griffin; Joseph Davis; Cynthia Biggs; Dexter Wansel; Grover Washington, Jr.	Naughty Shorts	5:10
11.	"It's a Must" (feat. Rahzel)	Griffin; Jonathan Burks; Rozell Brown	Jaz-O	4:24
12.	"Real Shit"	Griffin; Lawrence; Padilla	Amen-Ra; V.I.C.	4:21
13.	"How I Get Down"	Griffin; Mark James; Byron Olsen	The 45 King	4:05
14.	"L.I." (interlude)	Griffin	Rakim	0:53
15.	"Strong Island"	Griffin; Barrier	Rakim	4:34
16.	"Waiting for the World to End" (feat. DJ Premier)	Griffin; Martin; Barrier	DJ Premier	4:05
17.	"We'll Never Stop" (feat. Connie McKendrick)	Griffin; Nicholas Loizides; Sylvia Robinson	Nick Wiz	4:19
Total length:				62:07

Samples

- "Flow Forever" samples "Since We Said Goodbye" by The Counts
- "When I B on Tha Mic" samples "What the World Needs Now Is Love" by The Artistics, "The Saga Begins" by Rakim, "How About Some Hardcore" and "World Famous" by M.O.P., "Peter Piper" by Run-DMC, "Blind Alley" by The Emotions and "Metal Thangz" by Street Smartz feat. O.C. and Pharoahe Monch
- "Finest Ones" samples "We Belong Together" by The Spinners and "High Power Rap" by Crash Crew
- "I Know" samples "Let's Straighten It Out" by Latimore and "Steppin' Out" by Steel Pulse
- "It's the R" samples "Mother's Son" by Curtis Mayfield, "Tru Master" by Pete Rock feat. Inspectah Deck and Kurupt and "As the Rhyme Goes On", "Follow the Leader", "I Know You Got Soul" by Eric B. & Rakim
- "I'll Be There" samples "I'll Be With You" by Grover Washington, Jr.
- "Real Shit" samples "Survival of the Fittest" by Mobb Deep
- "How I Get Down" samples "Funky Drummer" by James Brown
- "Waiting for the World to End" samples "Brooks' 50c Tour (Main Title Collage)" by Quincy Jones, "Save Me" by Bloodstone, "All Night" by Xperadó and "Microphone Fiend" by Eric B. & Rakim
- "We'll Never Stop" samples "The New Rap Language" by Spoonie Gee and The Treacherous Three

== Charts ==
=== Album ===
Chart (1999)	Peak position
US Billboard 200	72
US Top R&B/Hip-Hop Albums (Billboard)	7

=== Singles ===
Year	Song	Chart positions		
Year	Song	Billboard Hot 100	Hot R&B/Hip-Hop Singles & Tracks	Hot Rap Singles
2000	"When I B On Tha Mic"	-	53	20

== Notes ==
- Nathan Brackett, Christian Hoard (2004). The New Rolling Stone Album Guide. Completely Revised and Updated 4th Edition. Simon and Schuster. ISBN 0-7432-0169-8.
