= The 18th Letter =

Studio album by Rakim
- Released: November 4, 1997
- Genre: Hip hop
- Length: 54:10
- Label: Universal
- Producers: DJ Clark Kent; Pete Rock; Father Shaheed; Nick Wiz; DJ Premier

Rakim chronology
The 18th Letter (1997)	The Master (1999)

The 18th Letter is the debut solo album by American rapper Rakim. It was released on November 4, 1997, through Universal Records in the United States. The album features production by DJ Clark Kent, Pete Rock, Father Shaheed, Nick Wiz and DJ Premier. It contains lyrical themes that concern hip hop's golden age, Rakim's rapping prowess, and the state of hip hop.

== Background ==
The album was Rakim's first release of new material following a five-year hiatus after Don't Sweat the Technique (1992) as duo Eric B. & Rakim. The album's title refers to the letter "R" being the eighteenth letter of the English alphabet.

== Deluxe version ==
A deluxe version of The 18th Letter was sold with the compilation disc The Book of Life (UD2-53111), an Eric B. & Rakim greatest hits collection. The Book of Life was also issued separately as a double vinyl LP.

== Commercial performance ==
The 18th Letter debuted at number four on the U.S. Billboard 200 chart and was certified Gold in the United States.

== Critical reception ==
Professional ratings
Review scores
Source	Rating
AllMusic	4/5 stars
Chicago Tribune	4/4 stars
Robert Christgau	(2-star Honorable Mention)
NME	6/10 stars
Pitchfork	8.0/10
Rolling Stone	3.5/5 stars
The Source	3.5/5 stars
Spin	7/10
USA Today	4/4 stars
Yahoo! Music	(favorable)

The New York Times wrote that the album "features gripping, richly textured backing tracks and kinetic wordplay filled with references to the Koran; his masterly command of rhyming has only deepened with time."

== Track listing ==
No.	Title	Writer(s)	Producer(s)	Length
1.	"Intro"			0:13
2.	"The 18th Letter (Always and Forever)"	William Griffin; Scott Phillips	Father Shaheed	3:01
3.	"Skit"			0:24
4.	"It's Been a Long Time"	Griffin; Christopher Martin; Eric Barrier; James Brown; Charles Bobbit; Bobby Byrd	DJ Premier	3:58
5.	"Remember That"	Griffin; Rodolfo Franklin	DJ Clark Kent	4:40
6.	"The Saga Begins"	Griffin; Peter Phillips	Pete Rock	4:22
7.	"Skit"			0:19
8.	"Guess Who's Back"	Griffin; Franklin; Hank Shocklee; Carlton Ridenhour; Eric Sadler; Barrier	DJ Clark Kent	4:11
9.	"Stay a While"	Griffin; Franklin; Steve Nichol; Carl McIntosh; Jane Sendall-Peters	DJ Clark Kent	4:25
10.	"New York (Ya Out There)"	Griffin; Martin; Bodie Chandler; Barry De Vorzon	DJ Premier	4:04
11.	"Show Me Love"	Griffin; Nick Loizides; Jack Knight	Nick Wiz	4:19
12.	"Skit"			0:19
13.	"The Mystery (Who Is God?)"	Griffin; Joe Davis	Naughty Shorts; Bill Blass^{[a]}	5:21
14.	"When I'm Flowin'"	Griffin; Phillips	Pete Rock	5:04
15.	"It's Been a Long Time (Suave House Mix)"	Griffin; Triston Jones	Mo-Suave-A	3:59
16.	"Guess Who's Back (Alternative Mix)"	Griffin; Franklin; Shocklee; Ridenhour; Sadler; Barrier	DJ Clark Kent	4:11
17.	"Outro"			1:20
Total length:				54:10

=== Notes ===
- ^{^[a]} signifies a co-producer.
- "The Mystery (Who Is God?)" contains scratches by DJ Sond.

=== The Book of Life ===
No.	Title	Writer(s)	Producer(s)	Length
1.	"I Know You Got Soul" (from Paid In Full)	Griffin; Barrier	Eric B.; Rakim	4:43
2.	"Follow the Leader" (from Follow the Leader)	Griffin; Barrier	Eric B.	5:32
3.	"Eric B. Is President" (from Paid In Full)	Griffin	Eric B.; Marley Marl (uncredited)	6:15
4.	"Microphone Fiend" (from Follow the Leader)	Griffin; Barrier	Eric B.	5:13
5.	"I Ain't No Joke" (from Paid In Full)	Griffin; Barrier	Eric B.; Rakim	3:52
6.	"Lyrics of Fury" (from Follow the Leader)	Griffin; Barrier	Eric B.; Rakim	4:11
7.	"My Melody" (from Paid In Full)	Griffin; Barrier	Eric B.; Rakim	6:47
8.	"Know the Ledge" (from Don't Sweat the Technique)	Griffin; Barrier	Eric B.; Rakim	3:58
9.	"Move the Crowd" (from Paid In Full)	Griffin; Barrier	Eric B.; Rakim	3:36
10.	"Let the Rhythm Hit ’Em" (from Let the Rhythm Hit 'Em)	Griffin; Barrier; William Mitchell	Eric B.; Rakim; Paul C; Large Professor	5:24
11.	"Mahogany" (from Let the Rhythm Hit 'Em)	Griffin; Barrier; Paul McKasty; Mitchell	Eric B.; Rakim; Paul C; Large Professor	4:27
12.	"In the Ghetto" (from Let the Rhythm Hit 'Em)	Griffin	Eric B.; Rakim; Paul C; Large Professor	5:26
13.	"Casualties of War" (from Don't Sweat the Technique)	Griffin	Eric B.	4:02
14.	"The Punisher" (from Don't Sweat the Technique)	Griffin	Eric B.	4:06
15.	"Paid in Full" (from Paid In Full)	Griffin; Barrier	Eric B.; Rakim	3:49
Total length:				71:21

== Charts ==
=== Weekly charts ===
Chart (1997)	Peak position
US Billboard 200	4
US Top R&B/Hip-Hop Albums (Billboard)	1

=== Year-end charts ===
Chart (1997)	Position
US Top R&B/Hip-Hop Albums (Billboard)	80
Chart (1998)	Position
US Top R&B/Hip-Hop Albums (Billboard)	70

== Certifications ==
Certifications for The 18th Letter
Region	Certification	Certified units/sales
United States (RIAA)	Gold	500,000^{^}
^{^} Shipments figures based on certification alone.

=== The 18th Letter & The Book of Life ===
Certifications for The 18th Letter & The Book of Life
Region	Certification	Certified units/sales
United States (RIAA)	Gold	500,000^{^}
^{^} Shipments figures based on certification alone.

== See also ==
- List of number-one R&B albums of 1997 (U.S.)
