= The Archive: Live, Lost & Found =

Compilation album by Rakim
- Released: March 4, 2008
- Recorded: 2007–2008
- Genre: Hip hop
- Length: 53:37
- Label: Fast Life; Koch
- Producer: Eric B.; Rakim; DJ Premier; DJ Clark Kent; Pete Rock

Rakim chronology
The Master (1999)	The Archive: Live, Lost & Found (2008)	The Seventh Seal (2009)

Professional ratings
Review scores
Source	Rating
AllMusic	3/5 stars
Okayplayer	3.5/5 stars
RapReviews	(7.5/10)

The Archive: Live, Lost & Found is a compilation album by American emcee Rakim. It was released on March 4, 2008, through Koch Records. featuring live performances, unreleased and rare material. The album peaked at number 99 on the Billboard Top R&B/Hip-Hop Albums chart.

== Track listing ==
No.	Title	Producer	Length
1.	"Hip-Hop"	Nick Wiz	4:08
2.	"Love 4 Sale"		4:25
3.	"Word on the Street"		3:46
4.	"It's Nothing"	Just Blaze	3:56
5.	"It's Been a Long Time"	DJ Premier	2:59
6.	"My Melody" (with Eric B.)	Eric B. & Rakim	2:37
7.	"Don't' Sweat the Technique" (with Eric B.)	Eric B.	1:58
8.	"Follow the Leader" (with Eric B.)	Eric B.	1:39
9.	"Ghetto"		3:03
10.	"Guess Who's Back?"	DJ Clark Kent	2:04
11.	"What's on Your Mind?" (with Eric B.)	Eric B.	1:44
12.	"Remember That"	DJ Clark Kent	1:18
13.	"It's Nothing"		3:10
14.	"Saga Begins"	Pete Rock	1:25
15.	"Move the Crowd" (with Eric B.)	Eric B. & Rakim	1:49
16.	"Paid in Full" (with Eric B.)	Eric B. & Rakim	1:53
17.	"I Know You Got Soul" (with Eric B.)	Eric B. & Rakim	2:41
18.	"I Ain't No Joke" (with Eric B.)	Eric B. & Rakim	3:33
19.	"Juice (Know the Ledge)" (with Eric B.)	Eric B.	2:35
20.	"Mahogany" (with Eric B.)	Eric B.	1:32
21.	"Eric B. Is President" (with Eric B.)	Eric B.	2:43
22.	"Microphone Fiend" (with Eric B.)	Eric B.	3:19
