= You & I (Cut Off Your Hands album) =

Studio album by Cut Off Your Hands
- Released: 2008 (NZ/Australia); 2009 (US)
- Recorded: West Heath Studios
- Genre: Indie rock, post-punk, jangle pop, power pop
- Label: Speak N Spell (NZ/Australia); Frenchkiss Records (US)
- Producer: Bernard Butler

Cut Off Your Hands chronology
You & I (2008)	Hollow (2011)

Professional ratings
Review scores
Source	Rating
Allmusic	link
Spin	7/10 stars
Prefix	6/10 stars

You & I is the 2008 debut album from Auckland pop-rock band Cut Off Your Hands. It was released in 2009 in the US. It was recorded with well-known indie producer Bernard Butler. Their song "Happy as Can Be" featured in the video game by EA Sports, FIFA 10.

== Track listing ==
The album was released under different labels in the US vs Australia/NZ.

=== CD ===
All tracks are written by Cut Off Your Hands, Nick Johnston.

No.	Title	Length
1.	"As Happy As Can Be"	3:34
2.	"Expectations"	2:58
3.	"Oh Girl"	3:25
4.	"Turn Cold"	2:59
5.	"It Doesn't Matter"	3:06
6.	"Heartbreak"	3:39
7.	"In The Name Of Jesus Christ"	2:54
8.	"Lets Get Out Of Here"	3:09
9.	"Still Fond"	3:05
10.	"Closed Eyes"	3:04
11.	"Nostalgia"	4:07
12.	"Someone Like Daniel"	3:19

=== Additional DVD (NZ/Aus) ===
In Australia and New Zealand the album came with an additional DVD with five tracks:

DVD
No.	Title	Length
1.	"You & I"
2.	"Let Go"
3.	"Still Fond"
4.	"Oh Girl"
5.	"Expectations"

== Credits ==
- Artwork By Art Direction – Joel Kefali, Special Problems
- Edited By – Mako Sakamoto
- Engineer – Bernard Butler (tracks: 1–3, 5–12), Seb Lewsley* (tracks: 1–3, 5–12), Tom Stanley (track 4)
- Mastered By – Chris Potter
- Photography [Original] – Arnold Skolnick
- Producer – Bernard Butler (tracks: 1–3, 5–12), Stephen Street (track 4)
- Technician [Assisted By] – Jackson Gold
- Written-By – Cut Off Your Hands, Nick Johnston
- Whistle (track 4) – Dave Shrimpton

== Charts ==
Chart (2008)	Peak position
Australian Albums (ARIA Charts)	99
New Zealand Albums (RIANZ)	21
