= List of Reel Affirmations award winners =

This is a list of films that have won awards at the Reel Affirmations film festival, an American festival of LGBT-related films held annually in Washington, D.C.

This list is organized by the year in which the award was given. Reel Affirmations film festivals are referred to by the order in which they occurred. For example, the sixth Reel Affirmations film fest is called "RA 6" in film festival shorthand, and occurred in 1996.

For many years, Reel Affirmations presented four major awards each year: Best Feature, Best Documentary, Best Male Short, and Best Female Short. Each award is bestowed based on audience balloting. The festival also

Beginning in 2000, the festival also distributed a Plant-A-Seed grant at the end of each festival. The grant was awarded by the One In Ten board to a filmmaker or filmmakers who have previously produced a feature film, short or documentary, and was intended to help the filmmaker complete a current work in progress. The grant was established in 2000. It was supported by audience donations and a silent auction held throughout each year's festival, and varied in amount from year to year. The grant award was discontinued in 2008.

Beginning in 2011, Reel Affirmations added three new awards. These included a First Time Director and a Best International Movie award. The festival also re-established its film completion grant award, renaming it the Keith Clark & Barry Becker Filmmaker Award (in honor of the co-founders of the festival).

== Reel Affirmations award winners ==
=== 1991 (RA 1) ===
- Best Feature: Not known
- Best Documentary: Not known
- Best Male Short: Not known
- Best Female Short: Not known

=== 1992 (RA 2) ===
- Best Feature: Not known
- Best Documentary: Not known
- Best Male Short: Not known
- Best Female Short: Not known

=== 1993 (RA 3) ===
- Best Feature: Not known
- Best Documentary: Not known
- Best Male Short: Not known
- Best Female Short: Not known

=== 1994 (RA 4) ===
- Best Feature: Not known
- Best Documentary: Not known
- Best Male Short: Not known
- Best Female Short: Not known

=== 1995 (RA 5) ===
- Best Feature: Not known
- Best Documentary: Not known
- Best Male Short: Not known
- Best Female Short: Not known

=== 1996 (RA 6) ===
- Best Feature: Not known
- Best Documentary: Not known
- Best Male Short: Not known
- Best Female Short: Not known

=== 1997 (RA 7) ===
- Best Feature: Not known
- Best Documentary: Not known
- Best Male Short: Not known
- Best Female Short: Not known

=== 1998 (RA 8) ===
- Best Feature: Not known
- Best Documentary: Not known
- Best Male Short: Not known
- Best Female Short: Not known

=== 1999 (RA 9) ===
- Best Feature: Not known
- Best Documentary: Not known
- Best Male Short: Not known
- Best Female Short: Not known

=== 2000 (RA 10) ===
- Best Feature: Not known
- Best Documentary: Not known
- Best Male Short: Not known
- Best Female Short: Not known
- Plant-A-Seed grant: Patrik-Ian Polk

=== 2001 (RA 11) ===
- Best Feature: Not known
- Best Documentary: Not known
- Best Male Short: Not known
- Best Female Short: Not known
- Plant-A-Seed grant: Paula Goldberg

=== 2002 (RA 12) ===
- Best Feature: Friends & Family
- Best Documentary: Swimming Upstream: A Year in the Life of Karen & Jenny
- Best Male Short: Boychick
- Best Female Short: Wilma's Sacrifice
- Plant-A-Seed grant: Todd Stephens

=== 2003 (RA 13) ===
- Best Feature: Latter Days
- Best Documentary: No Secret Anymore: The Times of Del Martin & Phyllis Lyon
- Best Male Short: A Bear's Story
- Best Female Short: The Ten Rules (A Lesbian Survival Guide)
- Plant-A-Seed grant: Erin Greenwell

=== 2004 (RA 14) ===
- Best Feature: Not known
- Best Documentary: Not known
- Best Male Short: Not known
- Best Female Short: Not known
- Plant-A-Seed grant: Not known

=== 2005 (RA 15) ===
- Best Feature: little man
- Best Documentary: Just Between Us
- Best Male Short: Ryan's Life
- Best Female Short: Getting to Know You
- Plant-A-Seed grant: Sarah Kellogg

=== 2006 (RA 16) ===
- Best Feature: C.R.A.Z.Y.
- Best Documentary: The Life of Reilly
- Best Male Short: Implication (Implicación)
- Best Female Short: Hi Maya (Hoi Maya)
- Plant-A-Seed grant: Carlos Portugal

=== 2007 (RA 17) ===
- Best Feature: The King and the Clown
- Best Documentary: For the Bible Tells Me So
- Best Male Short: Peking Turkey
- Best Female Short: Happenstance
- Plant-A-Seed grant: Stu Maddux and Joe Applebaum

=== 2008 (RA 18) ===
- Best Feature: Save Me
- Best Documentary: In Sickness and In Health
- Best Male Short: 41 Sekunden (41 Seconds)
- Best Female Short: Worst Case Scenario: Butch Edition
- Plant-A-Seed grant: This grant was discontinued in 2008

=== 2009 (RA 19) ===
- Best Feature: No awards given
- Best Documentary: No awards given
- Best Male Short: No awards given
- Best Female Short: No awards given

=== 2010 ===
Due to financial difficulties, the Reel Affirmations film festival was not held in 2010.

=== 2011 (RA 20) ===
- Best Feature: Pariah
- Best Documentary: Vito
- Best Male Short: I Don't Want to Go Back Alone
- Best Female Short: Cried Suicide
- Best International Movie: Mary Lou
- Best First-Time Director: Sal Bardo, for Requited
- Keith Clark & Barry Becker Filmmaker Award: Michele Josue and Liam McNill, to assist with the completion of the documentary Matthew Shepard Is A Friend of Mine
