= Kenneth G. Wilson (author) =

American writer (1923–2003)

Kenneth George Wilson (April 21, 1923 – March 11, 2003) was an American author, professor of English, and vice president at the University of Connecticut. His best-known work is The Columbia Guide to Standard American English, which was published in 1993.

== Early life and career ==
Wilson was born on April 21, 1923, in Akron, Ohio. A bachelor graduate of Albion College in 1943, Wilson earned his master's and doctoral degrees from the University of Michigan in 1948 and 1951. In 1951, he began working as an instructor of English at the University of Connecticut's Storrs campus, eventually rising to the position of full professor. From 1965 to 1966, he was head of the English Department. In 1966, he became dean of the University of Connecticut's College of Liberal Arts and Sciences, a position he held until 1970.

Through the 1970s, Wilson served as the University of Connecticut's vice president for academic programs or academic affairs. With the 1974 change in title, the vice presidency replaced the provost as the university's chief academic officer. Wilson was a member of many organizations, including the Medieval Academy of America, the Modern Language Association, the National Council of English Teachers, Phi Beta Kappa, and Phi Kappa Phi. He was also a consultant for the National Endowment for the Humanities and served two terms on the Commission on Institutions of Higher Education of the New England Association of Schools and Colleges, the primary accrediting board of New England. In 1987, Wilson wrote Van Winkle's Return: Change in American English, 1966–1986, which was acclaimed. The book was the result of his shock at the language, often vulgar or crude, that 1980s students used casually.

== The Columbia Guide to Standard American English ==
In 1993, Wilson published the Columbia Guide to Standard American English. He had a singular and direct style that was laced with humor; he also authored several other books and articles during his career. In the book's introduction, Wilson called standard American English usage "linguistic good manners, sensitively and accurately matched to context — to listeners or readers, to situation, and to purpose."

When The Columbia Guide to Standard American English, his magnum opus, was published online by Bartleby.com in 2001, the site said of Wilson's book, "A vigorous assessment of how our language is best written and spoken and how we can use it most effectively, this guide is the ideal handbook of language etiquette: friendly, sensible, reliable, and fun to read", and in 2005 added, "This most extensive handbook of the language ever published features over 6,500 descriptive and prescriptive entires [sic] with 4,300 hyperlinked cross-references." The electronic edition continues to be offered through licenses to libraries and other institutions; it has 6,500 entries, including both descriptive and prescriptive examples. The electronic edition features 4,300 hyperlinked cross-references.

== Death and legacy ==
Wilson died in Mansfield, Connecticut, on March 11, 2003. He was survived by his wife of 56 years, two children (a son and a daughter), and a brother. In December 2007, he was the subject of an article in the Contemporary Authors reference work published by Gale. Wilson was widely cited as an expert on the English language, and many of his contemporaries credited Wilson with starting the process of making the University of Connecticut a respected university at the national level.

John J. Gatta Jr., who was the interim head of the English Department at the University of Connecticut at the time of Wilson's death, said that "Ken had a wonderfully direct manner, and a very salty, wonderful kind of humor ... The Guide reflected his temperament, directness, and humor, but also conveyed his flexibility. He didn't believe in the Holy Rules of English." Milton R. Stern, also a member of the English Department, said that "Ken was one of the most valuable people the University has ever had. His intellectual nimbleness made him prime material for really serious administration. He was not a numbers guy, but was interested in university building – not bricks and mortar, but building the University from the inside out."

Stern added that Wilson, alongside former university president Homer D. Babbidge Jr., built "an enviable and increasingly recognizable life sciences group. They really put UConn's life sciences on the map ... Ken gave the loyalties of his life to the University ... He was a superb teacher, a superb scholar, and a superb administrator." Harry J. Hartley, the university president from 1990 to 1996, shared Stern's assessment and added that "Ken Wilson was one of the best academic administrators ever in higher education ... His instincts were almost always correct, and he always put the institution first."

== Selected works ==
As author or co-author

- Essays on Language and Usage (1962), with Leonard Fellows Dean
- Harbrace Guide to Dictionaries (1963)
- The Play of Language: A Revision of Essays on Language and Usage (January 1971, September 1971, ISBN 0-19-501304-2), with Leonard Fellows Dean and W. Walker Gibson
- Van Winkle's Return: Change in American English, 1966–1986 (June 1987, ISBN 0-87451-411-8)
- The Columbia Guide to Standard American English (1993, May 1999, ISBN 1-56731-267-5), from 2001 to June 2009 available free of charge online at Bartleby.com

As editor

- Models in Plant Physiology and Biochemistry by David W. Newman (October 1987, ISBN 0-8493-4342-9)
