= You, Me and Him =

You, Me and Him may refer to:

- You, Me and Him (2007 film), a Brazilian short film
- You, Me and Him (2017 film), a British romantic comedy film

== See also ==
- Me, You and Him, a 1992 British television sitcom
- You, Me and He, a 1984 album by Mtume
- Hum Tum Aur Woh (disambiguation)
