= Ek Main Aur Ekk Tu (soundtrack) =

Ek Main Aur Ekk Tu (Original Motion Picture Soundtrack)

Soundtrack album by Amit Trivedi
- Released: 25 December 2011
- Recorded: 2011
- Genre: Feature film soundtrack
- Length: 30:42
- Label: T-Series
- Producers: Karan Johar; Ronnie Screwvala

Amit Trivedi chronology
Trishna (2011)	Ek Main Aur Ekk Tu (Original Motion Picture Soundtrack) (2011)	Ishaqzaade (2012)

Ek Main Aur Ekk Tu (Original Motion Picture Soundtrack) is the soundtrack album to the 2012 film of the same name, directed by Shakun Batra and produced by UTV Motion Pictures and Dharma Productions, and starring Imran Khan and Kareena Kapoor Khan. The film's soundtrack consists of seven songs—five original compositions and two remixes—composed by Amit Trivedi and lyrics written by Amitabh Bhattacharya. The album was released through the T-Series label on Christmas, 25 December 2011; it marked the first Dharma soundtrack since 1998 to not be owned by Sony Music India.

== Background ==
Amit Trivedi composed the film's musical score and soundtrack with his norm collaborator Amitabh Bhattacharya serving as the songwriter. Trivedi previously associated with Dharma Productions on Wake Up Sid (2009), where he guest-composed one song "Iktara". Batra mentioned that Trivedi was the first choice for music director, and despite his busy schedules he was available for the project. Upon his involvement, he composed the song "Gubbare" first which was completed within a short span of time, but added that the title track took the longest to compose. The music rights of the film were sold to T-Series for ₹60 million (US$620,000) as a larger pact of Dharma Productions' music catalogue beginning with this film.

== Reception ==
The soundtrack met with a positive response, with Avijit Ghosh of The Times of India mentioning, "Composer Amit Trivedi and lyricist Amitabh Bhattacharya are among the finest musical team in Bollywood. In Ek Main Aur Ekk Tu, they are again at their best. The seductive 'Auntyji' and the racy title track have a delightful breeziness. And the more evocative tracks such as 'Gubbare Gubbare' and 'Aahatein' stay with you for long". While praising the compositions, Joginder Tuteja of Bollywood Hungama commented that the album belonged to a "niche audience". He added that the songs "Ek Main Aur Ekk Tu" and "Kar Chalna Shuru Tu" would make the most impression. Mitesh Saraf of Planet Bollywood, while summarising his review wrote, "The album has some cool songs to chill out to and they should sound even better on screen."

Sheetal Tiwari of BollySpice described the album "equally listenable", but deemed the soundtrack to be inferior of Trivedi's previous works and noted that it had a resemblance to Aisha (2010). In her review for BollywoodLife.com, Suparna Thombare wrote "Ek Main Aur Ekk Tu is not Amit Trivedi’s best work. But it's breezy and light, and makes you feel good about love and life." Karthik Srinivasan of Milliblog however felt that the soundtrack was "lot more Dharma Productions than Amit Trivedi". Vipin Nair of Music Aloud, also opined the same and called it to be an "entertaining score that is marred only by the lack of much newness in tunes." Anand Vaishnav of IndiaTimes summarised it as "Amit Trivedi sticks to a familiar template in the soundtrack of Ek Main Aur Ekk Tu", calling the album "melodious but predictable".

== Track listing ==
All lyrics are written by Amitabh Bhattacharya.

Ek Main Aur Ekk Tu (Original Motion Picture Soundtrack) track listing
No.	Title	Singer(s)	Length
1.	"Ek Main Aur Ekk Tu"	Benny Dayal, Anushka Manchanda	4:22
2.	"Gubbare"	Amit Trivedi, Shilpa Rao, Nikhil D'Souza	4:31
3.	"Aunty Ji"	Ash King, Bianca Gomes, Neuman Pinto, Fionas Pinto	4:34
4.	"Aahatein"	Karthik, Shilpa Rao	4:27
5.	"Kar Chalna Shuru Tu"	Vishal Dadlani, Shilpa Rao	4:56
6.	"Ek Main Aur Ekk Tu" (remix)	Benny Dayal, Anushka Manchanda, Shefali Alvares, Leon D'Souza	4:08
7.	"Aahatein" (remix)	Shekhar Ravjiani, Shilpa Rao	3:37
Total length:			30:42

== Accolades ==
Accolades for Ek Main Aur Ekk Tu (Original Motion Picture Soundtrack)
Award	Date of ceremony (Note: Each date is linked to the article about the awards held that year, wherever possible.)	Category	Recipients	Result	Ref
Filmfare Awards	20 January 2013	Best Choreographer	Bosco–Caesar for "Aunty Ji"	Won	
