= Just Between Us =

Just Between Us may refer to:

== Literature ==
- Just Between Us, a novel by Cathy Kelly
- Just Between Us..., a novel by Tori Carrington
- Just Between Us, a novel based on the American TV sitcom So Little Time
- Just Between Us, a Christian women's magazine founded by Jill Briscoe
- Greg Gorman: Just Between Us, a photography book by Greg Gorman
- "Natsuki Takaya's Just Between Us", a story serialized in the Japanese shōjo manga series Phantom Dream

== Music ==
- Just Between Us (Norman Brown album), 1992
- Just Between Us (Ray Charles album), 1988
- Just Between Us, an album by Gerald Albright
- Just Between Us, an album by Rudy Linka
- "Just Between Us", a song by Randy Brecker from Into the Sun
- "Just Between Us", a song by Talisman from Talisman

== Film, television and video ==
- Just Between Us (film), a 2010 Croatian film
- Just Between Us, the trial run title of The Jenny Jones Show
- Just Between Us!, a TV interview show co-hosted by William Smithers
- Just Between Us, a documentary film that received a 2005 Reel Affirmations award
- Just Between Us, a pornographic film written by Jessica Drake
- Just Between Us, a YouTube comedy channel of Gabe Dunn and Allison Raskin
