= Speak n Spell Music =

Speak n Spell Music (or Speak n Spell Music Publishing Pty Ltd) was an Australia and New Zealand based record label, artist management, international touring and music licensing company. It was founded by Jonathan Wilson, David Shrimpton and David Benge in 2004. From 2007, the record label was based in Collingwood, Victoria. The label released over 120 titles, which were distributed via Inertia and Universal. Some artists released on Speak n Spell included Editors, Midlake, School of Seven Bells, Warpaint and Dappled Cities. The management company looked after four acts signed to both independent and major labels locally and internationally in the UK, Europe and the USA. The Management roster included Cut Off Your Hands (NZ), Violent Soho, Jack Ladder (AMP Winner 2008), Kid Sam (2009 J Award nominee), Ghoul and producer Scott Horscroft.

Speak and Spell Music was officially closed in April 2011.
