= The Seventh Seal (Rakim album) =

Studio album by Rakim
- Released: November 17, 2009
- Recorded: 2007–2009
- Genre: Hip hop
- Length: 61:41
- Labels: Ra; TVM; SMC; Fontana; UMG
- Producers: Matthew Kemp (exec.); Rakim (exec.); J. Wells; Jake One; Lofey; Needlz; Neo Da Matrix; Nick Wiz; Nottz; Poppa Pill; Samuel Christian; Slyce; Y-Not

Rakim chronology
The Archive: Live, Lost & Found (2008)	The Seventh Seal (2009)	G.O.D.'s Network: Reb7rth (2024)

Singles from The Seventh Seal
- 1. "Holy Are U" Released: July 14, 2009; 2. "Walk These Streets" Released: October 7, 2009

Professional ratings
Aggregate scores
Source	Rating
Metacritic	59/100
Review scores
Source	Rating
About.com	2.5/5 stars
AllMusic	3.5/5 stars
The A.V. Club	C
Los Angeles Times	2.5/4 stars
Pitchfork	5.6/10
PopMatters	4/10
Slant Magazine	2.5/5 stars
Spin	2.5/5 stars
Time Out	4/5 stars
The Village Voice	(mixed)

The Seventh Seal is the third studio album by American rapper Rakim. It was released on November 17, 2009, after several delays on Rakim's own Ra Records, TVM, and SMC Recordings and distributed through Fontana and Universal Music Group. Considered a comeback album after a ten-year hiatus, the album features the singles "Holy Are You," which was released on July 14, 2009, and "Walk These Streets" released on October 7, 2009. It was produced by Nottz, Needlz, Jake One, and Nick Wiz.

The album sold 12,000 copies in the United States by November 22, 2009, according to SoundScan. Upon its release, The Seventh Seal received generally mixed or average reviews from most music critics, based on an aggregate score of 59/100 from Metacritic.

== Background ==
=== Recording ===
The original title for the album was Oh, My God, with the original release date set for 2002, but Rakim left Dr. Dre's Aftermath record label and the project was shelved. The official reason for Rakim's departure was creative differences with Dre.

After leaving the label, Rakim began recording new songs for the album and Dr. Dre allowed him to keep the songs that he originally produced. In 2007, Rakim decided to record completely new songs for the album. In an interview with Billboard on July 13, 2009, when asked whether the album contains material from the unreleased Aftermath project, he stated "No, that's locked down in the lab for now. This is me live from New York City, everything brand new."

== Music ==
=== Concept ===
In an interview with Billboard in 2007, when asked about story behind the title, Rakim said,

The number 7 has a lot of significance. The seventh letter of the alphabet is G—that stands for God. There are seven continents, seven seas. The Seventh Seal deals with that and also some revelations in the Bible. Some call it the end of the world, but for me it's the end of the old and the beginning of the new. By me naming my album that, I'm using it metaphorically in hip hop. I'm hoping to kill the old state of hip hop and start with the new.

In an interview in early 2009, when asked about the new generation of hip hop fans, Rakim said,

I don't accept that the new generation is looking for anything different than what we've always been looking for. Depending on the moment, they want bangers that make them crack their neck, they want tracks that put them in a zone where they can sit back and chill. The ladies want something that makes them feel sexy and loved. And everyone wants something that makes them think a little bit-at least sometimes. Every generation wants that real hip-hop. And I've always been able to bring that.

In another interview with Billboard in 2009, he stated,

The seals are from the Bible—Revelations and the coming of the Apocalypse. But Islam, Judaism, Christianity—all have a version of the same events. The Lion of Judah breaks the seven seals one by one, each imparting knowledge and inflicting catastrophe, ending with seven trumpets announcing the end of Times. After the Apocalypse, God rises from the ashes to recreate the Kingdom, taking only the greatest elements from the past with them. When you look at Hip-Hop, I want to do that: to spit fire and take our best from the ashes to build our kingdom; to recognize all the regional styles, conscious lyrics, the tracks, underground, mainstream, the way we treat each other. Lose the garbage and rebuild our scene. I've always tried to insert consciousness and spirituality in my records, interpreting the writings of all cultures and religions and how they apply to life in modern times.

In another interview with Billboard in November 2009, Rakim said,

"The majority of this album has that melodic New York sound- I just tried to make it a good, all-around New York album," he says. "That's why I did songs like 'Euphoria,' with [New York rappers] Jadakiss, Busta Rhymes and Styles P-wanted to make sure our presence was felt."

=== Production and guests ===
Rakim confirmed that The Seventh Seal would have 14 tracks, with the main guests being Maino, I.Q., and his own daughter Destiny Griffin. Several songs on the album were produced by longtime Rakim collaborator Nick Wiz and featured beats from Nottz, Needlz, SR. Shakur Jake One, and from Italian rapper/producer Bassi Maestro.

== Track listing ==
No.	Title	Producer(s)	Length
1.	"How to Emcee"	Slyce; YSAE	4:13
2.	"Walk These Streets" (feat. Maino)	Needlz	4:04
3.	"Documentary of a Gangsta" (feat. IQ)	Soundsmith Productions (Y-Not)	4:12
4.	"Man Above" (feat. Tracey Horton)	Nottz	4:26
5.	"You and I" (feat. Samuel Christian)	Samuel Christian; J Wells	4:42
6.	"Won’t Be Long" (feat. Tracey Horton)	Jake One	4:49
7.	"Holy Are U"	Nick Wiz	4:06
8.	"Satisfaction Guaranteed"	Neo Da Matrix	4:26
9.	"Working for You"	Bassi Maestro	4:18
10.	"Message in the Song" (feat. Destiny Griffin)	Nick Wiz; Lofey	3:52
11.	"Put It All to Music"	Poppa Pill	4:02
12.	"Psychic Love"	Nick Wiz	3:28
13.	"Still in Love"	Nick Wiz	2:42
14.	"Dedicated"	Nick Wiz	3:35
Total length:			56:55

Bonus track
No.	Title	Producer(s)	Length
15.	"Euphoria" (feat. Styles P, Jadakiss, Busta Rhymes) with DJ Cocoa Chanelle on the chorus (Exclusive bonus track via www.rakim.com only, announced to the buyers of the album)	Ty Fyffe	4:46
Total length:			61:41

== Charts ==
Chart (2009)	Peak position
US Billboard 200	67
US Top R&B/Hip-Hop Albums (Billboard)	9
