= Sandy Green (singer) =

Sandy
- Born: Sandy Green; 18 June 1987 (age 39)
- Origin: Croydon, Surrey, England
- Genres: R&B, soul
- Instruments: vocals, keyboard
- Years active: 2006–present
- Label: Sandy Music
- Website: Sandy-music.net

Sandy Green (born 18 June 1987), known professionally as Sandy, is an English singer and songwriter.

== Background ==
Sandy’s interest in music began at an early age. Growing up with a father who was an avid music fan, Sandy became influenced by his rich and eclectic music collection. At the age of 12 Sandy formed a vocal group with two friends, called Xposia. Sandy was the lead singer and together the girls wrote and performed their music, performing at local venues. Sandy learnt to play the piano and continued her songwriting. After completing her GCSEs, Sandy attended the Academy of Contemporary Music in Guildford, Surrey.

It was at this time that Sandy focused on her songwriting and performing skills with a view to releasing her music to the general public.

== Music career ==
Sandy’s debut single was released through the independent record label, Sandy Music, in February 2007 on digital download. The A-side, "So into You", was an uptempo R&B track. A video for the song was released and received airplay across Europe and on selected outlets in the United Kingdom.

The B-side to the single featured a rap from Silvastone. Sandy's second single, "You and Me", was released on 23 July 2007 on digital download only, again through the Sandy Music label. Her debut album was released on 6 August 2007. The album Affairs of the Heart, included tracks she had been performing on her live appearances. Featured guests on the album include Flawless (formerly of Big Brovaz), Chunks and Silvastone. Sandy is the chief songwriter on Affairs of the Heart, with Silvastone as producer.

Sandy has performed at the Birmingham Carnival, the Under One Sky Festival, Cambridge Big Weekend, the Bedford and the 2CR Radio Awards. She has been interviewed on outlets that include BEN TV, BBC Radio London, Colourful Radio, South London Press, The Voice, Croydon Advertiser, BBC Three Counties Radio and Passion TV.

== Discography ==
=== Albums ===
- Affairs of the Heart (2007)

=== Singles ===
- "So Into You" (2007)
- "You and Me" (2007)
