= Lara Croft and the Guardian of Light =

2010 video game

- Developer: Crystal Dynamics (Note: Ported to Microsoft Windows and PlayStation 3 by Nixxes Software)
- Publisher: Square Enix
- Director: Daniel Neuburger
- Series: Tomb Raider
- Platforms: Android; BlackBerry PlayBook; Google Chrome; iOS; Microsoft Windows; PlayStation 3; Xbox 360; Stadia; Nintendo Switch
- Release: 18 August 2010: Xbox 360; NA: 18 August 2010; EU: 18 August 2010; AU: 19 August 2010 Microsoft Windows, PlayStation 3; NA: 28 September 2010; EU: 28 September 2010; AU: 29 September 2010 iOS 16 December 2010 BlackBerry PlayBook 30 April 2012 Stadia 22 December 2020 Nintendo Switch 29 June 2023
- Genre: Action-adventure
- Modes: Single-player, multiplayer

Lara Croft and the Guardian of Light is a 2010 action-adventure game developed by Crystal Dynamics and published by Square Enix for Microsoft Windows, PlayStation 3, Xbox 360, Android and iOS. It is part of the Tomb Raider series, but unlike previous games, the game does not carry the Tomb Raider brand and has a heavy emphasis on cooperative gameplay. In multiplayer, players take the role as either Lara Croft or a 2,000-year-old Mayan warrior named Totec. They must work together in order to stop the evil spirit Xolotl and retrieve the Mirror of Smoke. A single-player campaign mode is available that does not include the non-playable character AI following or helping Lara.

In the United States and United Kingdom, Guardian of Light was released for the Xbox Live Arcade on 18 August 2010; it was released a month later on 28 September for PlayStation Network and Steam. Though local cooperative was available at the initial release for all versions, online cooperative was later added. In North America, on 16 December, the video game was released for iOS devices which included cooperative with Wi-Fi and Bluetooth options. The first downloadable content (DLC) map pack was released for free for a limited time.

Lara Croft and the Guardian of Light was well received by critics and has sold more than one million copies on all platforms. A sequel, Lara Croft and the Temple of Osiris, was released in 2014. The game was released along with its successor as part of The Lara Croft Collection for Nintendo Switch by Feral Interactive on 29 June 2023.

== Gameplay ==
Guardian of Light is played from a fixed perspective, similar to classic two dimensional isometric games.

Unlike previous installments of the series, which were adventure games with a virtual camera viewpoint, Guardian of Light is a non-linear "arcade-inspired" action game with a fixed isometric camera, similar to Tomb Raider: The Prophecy for Game Boy Advance. The game also features cooperative gameplay, and players can take control of either Lara or an ancient Mayan warrior named Totec. Each playable character possesses unique weapons and skills. Like with some previous installments, Lara retains her dual pistols with infinite ammunition and a grappling hook, which she is able to use to cross gaps and which Totec can tightrope walk across. Totec carries spears which can be used both as a weapon and on the environment, for Lara to climb on. Both characters carry unlimited "bombs" that can be dropped and detonated. Tombs can be explored and some have "booby-trap puzzles" to solve. The game does not have any loading screens once a level is started.

The Guardian of Light may be played with a single player, and a second player may join at any time, whether online or locally. In the single-player campaign the only playable character is Lara; Totec cannot assist and Lara has all the tools required along with new abilities to make it through her own unique adventure. Puzzles and parts of the map are also different. Creative director Daniel Neuberger said that this was because he did not want the player to get frustrated by having to rely on AI. The campaign features eight to ten hours of gameplay.

=== Multiplayer ===
In multiplayer, a first in the series, gameplay has an emphasis on teamwork. Lara is able to use Totec's shield as a portable platform as he holds it above his head. She may also balance on spears that Totec throws in the wall, but Totec cannot, as they are not able to hold his weight. Totec can tightrope walk using Lara's grappling rope. As the game progresses, Totec learns from Lara how to use modern weapons, such as rifles. When enemies are killed, point scores appear above their bodies—red or blue—depending on whether Lara (red) or Totec (blue) scored the kill. There are pick-ups, such as gems, scattered throughout the levels that increase the player's score. Receiving high scores in each level rewards the players with new weapons and upgrades. To add competitiveness into the game, there are a limited number of enemies and gems in the world so the players may compete to kill and grab them all. The multiplayer mode reportedly features approximately six to eight hours of gameplay, depending on teamwork.

== Synopsis ==
=== Characters ===
The Guardian of Light stars Lara Croft, an English archaeologist and Totec, an ancient Mayan warrior and leader of the Army of Light. An evil spirit called Xolotl is the antagonist. Some of his minions that he makes come to life include: giant spiders, demon like creatures, and huge trolls. Lara is again voiced by Keeley Hawes and Totec is newly voiced by Jim Cummings.

=== Plot ===
Two thousand years ago in ancient Mexico, a battle was waged between Totec, the Guardian of the Light, and Xolotl, the Keeper of Darkness. Totec's army was defeated when Xolotl used the mirror of smoke to unleash hordes of ghastly creatures that fought on his behalf. Totec survived the battle and found a way to defeat Xolotl, imprisoning him in the mirror of smoke and becoming its immortal guardian in the form of a stone statue. In the present day, Lara Croft reads of the legend and attempts to find the mirror. After a long and dangerous journey she is successful. While examining the mirror, she is caught unaware by a band of mercenaries. Led by the local warlord, they had followed her into the temple. Unknowing or unbelieving of the curse upon the mirror, the warlord takes it from Lara. His reckless handling of the mirror releases Xolotl. The stone statue of Totec comes to life and warns Lara that Xolotl must be stopped before the light of dawn. Depending on the number of players participating, Lara and Totec either join forces or go their separate ways to try to stop Xolotl.

== Development ==
Guardian of Light is not part of the main Tomb Raider brand, but was intended to start a new series simply titled "Lara Croft". Brand director Karl Stewart said: "When Underworld was finished, that was the end to the trilogy, and kind of the end of a whole era for us. We took a step back as a studio and spent a couple of months experimenting, trying to make a decision on how to go forward". Stewart also said that everyone who worked on Guardian of Light also worked on the previous three games (Tomb Raider: Legend, Tomb Raider: Anniversary, and Tomb Raider: Underworld). Guardian of Light uses the same game engine as Tomb Raider: Underworld and features real-time lighting effects, realistic shadows and "tons" of physics-based objects. Vegetation sways in the wind and reacts when the player walks through it. The environments have a "nice sense of scale".

The game's producer, Forest Large, said in a podcast that New Orleans was considered as a location, but due to time restraints, the location was ultimately decided to be Mexico and elements from previous games, such as plants, were borrowed and modified for Guardian of Light. Crystal Dynamics said that development on Guardian of Light had not affected development on the next main installment and reboot of the franchise, titled Tomb Raider. Lara Croft and the Guardian of Light uses recycled musical cues from Legend, Anniversary, and Underworld by composers Troels Brun Folmann and Colin O'Malley.

== Release ==
Lara Croft and the Guardian of Light was shown at E3 2010 on 14 June. It is a download only title and was released on Microsoft's Xbox Live Arcade on 18 August. Originally, cooperative online gameplay was to be enabled on 28 September, the day of the PC and PlayStation Network release, but on-line cooperative was delayed for all three platforms until a later date. Karl Stewart said that they had an agreement with Microsoft and the game was initially XLA exclusive. The Microsoft Windows version was distributed exclusively by the digital distribution platform Steam. Online cooperative was made available for the PlayStation 3 on 22 November. The Microsoft Windows version also received online cooperative play, being patched one day later. In North America, on 16 December, Crystal Dynamics released an iOS version of Guardian of Light for the iPod, iPhone, and iPad. Although the level layouts of the game are identical to the PC, Xbox Live and PlayStation Network versions, it only contains 10 levels instead of 14, skipping straight to the level "Xolotl's Stronghold" after "Twisting Bridge", and doesn't include the DLC; online cooperative play is available with both Wi-Fi and Bluetooth options. The Xbox 360 version of the game was made backwards compatible with the Xbox One in 2018, and later made playable on the Xbox Series X and Series S through the same method.

=== Downloadable content ===
Guardian of Light received extended support after its official release date with five downloadable content packs, which were released from October through December 2010. Three of the packs, "All the Trappings", "Things That Go Boom", and "A Hazardous Reunion", contain new maps and puzzles, although the second pack was not released on Xbox 360 due to "unforeseen problems"(though it would later finally be released on 360 several years later). The other two DLC packs feature alternate playable characters from other Eidos Interactive-owned series - Kain and Raziel of Crystal Dynamics' Legacy of Kain series, and Kane and Lynch of IO Interactive's Kane & Lynch games. Both packs retell the events of the game, but in an alternate timeline following the same events occurred in Lara's adventure, but with minor changes to the story. The first downloadable content pack, entitled All The Trappings, received a thirty-day free release alongside the online cooperative patch on 27 October for Xbox 360.

=== The Lara Croft Collection ===
On October 28, 2021, on the 25th anniversary of the first Tomb Raider game being released on the Sega Saturn in Europe, Crystal Dynamics announced that Guardian of Light and its sequel Temple of Osiris would be ported to Nintendo Switch in 2022. In December 2022, over a year following the announcement and the Crystal Dynamics acquisition by Embracer Group, Feral Interactive confirmed that the games would instead be released in 2023. On June 15, 2023, The Lara Croft Collection was announced for release on June 29, with pre-orders being made available on the Nintendo eShop that same day.

== Reception ==
Reception

Aggregate score
Aggregator	Score
Metacritic	X360: 85/100; PS3: 84/100; PC: 82/100 iOS: 73/100

Review scores
Publication	Score
1Up.com	A−
Eurogamer	9/10
Game Informer	9/10
GamesRadar+	9/10
IGN	8.5/10
Official Xbox Magazine (US)	8.5/10
X-Play	4/5

Lara Croft and the Guardian of Light was very well received by critics. The Xbox 360 version of the game holds an average score of 85 out of 100 on the aggregate website Metacritic. The PlayStation 3 version of the game holds an average score of 84 out of 100 and the PC version holds an 82 out of 100. In a September 2010 ranking, IGN listed Lara Croft and the Guardian of Light fourteenth in their top twenty-five Xbox Live Arcade titles of all time. Initial sales show the game has done well, with Guardian of Light selling 98,000 copies on Xbox Live in its first six weeks. As of October 2010, over 111,000 copies were sold on Xbox Live and 138,000 as of year-end 2010. Square Enix head of product development, Darrell Gallagher, revealed in August 2013 that the game had sold more than 1 million copies on all platforms.

Daemon Hatfield of IGN gave the Xbox 360 version of the game a rating of 8.5, but was critical of story and dialogue. Chris Watters of GameSpot also gave the Xbox 360 version an 8.5 rating, praising puzzles, visuals, replay value and challenges, but panned the game's plot. Tom Hoggins from telegraph.co.uk was positive to the game.

Matt Cabral of GamePro also gave the game a positive review, giving the game 4.5/5 for puzzles, exploration and combat gameplay, but expressed game's storyline as the weakest point.

Keza MacDonald of Eurogamer gave Guardian of Light a 9 out of 10; the same rating was also given by Meagan Marie of Game Informer and Tom Orry of VideoGamer.com.
