= Tomb Raider (2013 video game) =

2013 video game

- Developer: Crystal Dynamics (Note: Additional development by Eidos Montréal; ported to Microsoft Windows, PlayStation 3, and PlayStation 4 by Nixxes Software with development support for the Definitive Edition by United Front Games and to OS X and Linux by Feral Interactive.)
- Publisher: Square Enix (Note: Feral Interactive published the OS X, iOS, and Android versions. Aspyr published the Switch and Switch 2 versions.)
- Directors: Noah Hughes; Daniel Chayer; Daniel Neuburger
- Producer: Kyle Peschel
- Programmer: Scott Krotz
- Artist: Brian Horton
- Writers: Rhianna Pratchett; Susan O'Connor; John Stafford
- Composer: Jason Graves
- Series: Tomb Raider
- Platforms: PlayStation 3; Windows; Xbox 360; OS X; PlayStation 4; Xbox One; Linux; Shield TV; Stadia; Nintendo Switch; Nintendo Switch 2; Android; iOS
- Release: 5 March 2013: PS3, Windows, Xbox 360; WW: 5 March 2013 OS X; WW: 23 January 2014 PlayStation 4, Xbox One; NA: 28 January 2014; AU: 30 January 2014; EU: 31 January 2014 Linux; WW: 27 April 2016 Shield TV; WW: 7 March 2017 Stadia; WW: 19 November 2019 Switch, Switch 2; WW: 18 November 2025 Android, iOS; WW: 12 February 2026
- Genre: Action-adventure
- Modes: Single-player, multiplayer

Tomb Raider is a 2013 action-adventure game developed by Crystal Dynamics and published by Square Enix. It is the tenth main entry and a reboot of the Tomb Raider series, acting as the first instalment in the Survivor trilogy that reconstructs the origins of Lara Croft. The game was released for PlayStation 3, Windows, and Xbox 360 on 5 March 2013. Gameplay focuses on survival, with exploration when traversing the island and visiting various optional tombs. It is the first game in the main series to have multiplayer and the first game in the series to be published by Square Enix after the latter's acquisition of Eidos Interactive in 2009.

Crystal Dynamics began development of Tomb Raider soon after the release of Tomb Raider: Underworld in 2008. Rather than a sequel, the team decided to reboot the series, re-establishing the origins of Lara Croft for the second time, as they did with Tomb Raider: Legend. Tomb Raider is set on Yamatai, an island from which Lara, who is untested and not yet the battle-hardened explorer she is in other titles in the series, must save her friends and escape while being hunted down by a malevolent cult. Camilla Luddington was hired to voice and perform as Lara Croft, replacing Keeley Hawes.

Tomb Raider received critical acclaim and is considered to be one of the greatest video games ever made; it was praised for its graphics, gameplay, Luddington's performance as Lara, and Lara's characterization and development, although the addition of a multiplayer mode was criticized. The game sold over 14.5 million units worldwide by October 2021, making it the best-selling Tomb Raider title to date. A remastered version, Tomb Raider: Definitive Edition, featuring improved graphics, new control features, and downloadable content, was released for PlayStation 4 and Xbox One in January 2014, for Windows in April 2024, and for Nintendo Switch and Nintendo Switch 2 in November 2025. An Android and iOS version was released in February 2026. The game was followed by Rise of the Tomb Raider (2015) and Shadow of the Tomb Raider (2018).

== Gameplay ==
Tomb Raider is presented in third-person perspective. Players take control of the series lead character Lara Croft. The game uses an interconnected hub-and-spoke model that combines action-adventure, exploration, and survival elements. Players can traverse between the camps and across the island using footpaths, improvised or already-available ziplines and climbable tracks. Many of Lara's moves are carried over from the previous games created by Crystal Dynamics, with some tweaks added, such as incorporating elements of stealth gameplay. Quick time events are scattered at regular intervals throughout the game, often appearing at crucial or fast-moving points in the game's plot, such as extracting a shard of metal, and escaping a collapsing cave.

Players can create makeshift ziplines to traverse between camps and across the island.

The combat of the game borrows multiple elements from Naughty Dog's Uncharted series, with players having the ability to free-aim Lara's bow and the guns she salvages, engage in close-quarter combat and perform stealth kills. Players can use Survival Instinct, an ability in which enemies, collectables and objects pivotal to environmental puzzles will be highlighted. The game incorporates role-playing elements: as players progress through the game, they earn experience points from performing certain actions and completing in-game challenges linked with hunting, exploring and combat: this enables players' skills and abilities to be upgraded in specific ways, such as giving her more storage capacity for arrows and ammunition. Players can upgrade and customize weapons using salvaged materials collected across the island. There is a character progression mechanic in the game: better items, weapons and equipment are gained as players progress, though the appearance of most of these items is closely linked to events in the story. In addition to the main story, players can complete multiple side quests, explore the island, revisit locations, and search for challenge tombs.

=== Multiplayer ===
Alongside the single-player mode is an online multiplayer mode, which allows players to compete in several maps. In each multiplayer match, there are two enemy teams: four survivors and four scavengers, and there are three types of games for multiplayer to compete in, played in five different maps: the modes are Team Deathmatch, Private Rescue and Cry for Help. The first mode is a player versus player (PvP) combat scenario, with teams pitted against each other, and the winning team being the one to kill the opposing team in three separate matches. In the second mode, the "survivors" team must take medical supplies to a specific point on the map, while the "scavengers" must reach a certain number of kills, both within a ten-minute time limit. The third mode, "Cry for Help", involves the survivors exploring the maps and retrieving batteries for defended radio beacons while being hunted by the scavengers. Across all three modes, weapons and destroyable environments from the single-player campaign are carried over.

== Synopsis ==
=== Setting and characters ===
The game is set on Yamatai, a fictional lost island in the Dragon's Triangle off the coast of Japan. The island—and the kingdom that once existed there—is steeped in myth, given its reputation for fearsome storms and shipwrecks that litter its coastline. Yamatai was once ruled by queen Himiko, known as the "Sun Queen", who, according to legend, was blessed with shamanistic powers that enabled her to control the weather. Little is known about Yamatai's history following Himiko's death, though the island's infamy was established shortly thereafter. In exploring the island, the player may find evidence that—among others—Portuguese traders, United States Marines, and a Japanese military project were all stranded on Yamatai at various points in history.

Throughout the game, Yamatai is presently inhabited by the Solarii Brotherhood, a violent cult of criminals, mercenaries, and shipwreck survivors. The Solarii Brotherhood has established a rigid society based on the worship of Himiko, complete with its own hierarchy and laws, with their exact purpose and intentions gradually revealed throughout the story.

The player controls Lara Croft, a young and ambitious archaeology graduate whose theories on the location of Yamatai's lost kingdom have convinced the Nishimura family—descendants of Yamatai's people themselves—to fund an expedition in search of the kingdom. The expedition is led by Dr. James Whitman, a celebrity archaeologist who has fallen on hard times and is desperate to avoid bankruptcy, and includes Conrad Roth, a former Royal Marine and close friend of the Croft family who serves as Lara's mentor; Samantha "Sam" Nishimura, Lara's friend and documentary filmmaker representing her family's interests; Joslyn Reyes, a pragmatic and short-tempered mechanic and single mother; Jonah Maiava, a friendly but physically imposing fisherman with an open mind toward the supernatural; Angus "Grim" Grimaldi, the gruff helmsman of the Endurance; and Alex Weiss, a goofy electronics specialist.

=== Plot ===
Lara embarks on her first archaeological expedition aboard the Endurance, intending to find the lost kingdom of Yamatai. By her theory and against Whitman's advice, the crew sails into the treacherous Dragon's Triangle, where the ship is struck by a violent storm and sinks, stranding the survivors on a remote island. Separated from the others, Lara regains consciousness in a cave and narrowly escapes from a deranged savage.

As Lara searches for the other survivors, she discovers more evidence that the island is inhabited. She finds Sam with a man named Mathias, who claims to be a fellow passenger. As Sam tells Mathias the legend of Himiko, Lara falls asleep; when she wakes, both of them have disappeared. After reuniting with the rest of the crew, Lara separates from the group with Whitman to look for Roth, while the others search for Sam and Mathias.

While exploring the island, Lara and Whitman discover that its inhabitants worship Himiko, confirming that the island is indeed Yamatai. The two are captured by the inhabitants and taken to a settlement alongside other Endurance survivors, where an attempted escape turns violent; Lara is separated from Whitman and is forced to kill one of her attackers. She eventually locates an injured Roth, and, with his gear, sets off for a communications relay at the top of a mountain to contact help.

Lara successfully hails a nearby search plane and sets a signal fire, but a supernatural storm suddenly forms and destroys the plane. Although the pilot successfully parachutes to safety, Lara is unable to stop the island's inhabitants from killing him. She is contacted by Alex and Reyes, who reveal that Sam has been abducted by the same inhabitants, revealed to be a hostile cult called the Solarii Brotherhood. Being closest to the location, Lara attempts a rescue but is foiled by Mathias, who is revealed as the cult's leader and orders her killed. However, she is saved by the intervention of a samurai-like "Oni" and taken to an ancient monastery in the mountains.

Escaping again, Lara stumbles upon a ritual chamber where she learns that a ceremonial "fire ritual" is used to choose Himiko's successor as part of the "Ascension". Sam manages to contact Lara and reveals that the Solarii plan to subject her to the ritual, which could kill her if she is deemed an "unworthy" successor. Lara storms the Solarii fortress with Grim's help, but he is killed during the assault. With Roth's help, Lara infiltrates the palace and arrives in time for the ritual. She attempts to save Sam but is overpowered by Mathias and his men. However, the flames do not harm Sam and are extinguished by a sudden gust of wind, marking her as Himiko's rightful successor.

Lara narrowly escapes captivity once more and returns to help the captured crew. With help from Whitman, who has managed to negotiate limited freedom within the Solarii, Lara infiltrates the palace again to save Sam while Roth prepares to extract them via helicopter. Having seen the supernatural storm that downed the previous plane, Lara urges Sam to flee by land and tries to stop the helicopter from taking off, but another storm forms and strikes the helicopter, causing it to crash. Lara nearly dies, and Roth is fatally wounded by Mathias while saving her. Devastated, Lara realizes that the storms are being magically generated to trap people on the island.

Lara reconvenes with the crew, who have avoided capture long enough to secure a boat that can be repaired for their escape. Whitman rejoins them, claiming to have escaped captivity, though Lara suspects him of working with the cultists. She heads to the wreck of the Endurance to search for Alex, who had gone to salvage the necessary repair tools. Lara finds him pinned under debris, but Alex insists she flee from oncoming Solarii cultists and sacrifices himself so she can escape with the equipment.

Following clues left by a World War II-era Japanese military expedition that studied the island's storms, Lara explores an ancient coastal tomb. There, she finds the remains of the general of the Stormguard—the Oni defending the monastery—who committed seppuku; in his final message, he reveals that Himiko's previous successor took her own life rather than receive Himiko's power, leaving Himiko's soul trapped in her corpse. Lara concludes that the Ascension is a ritual in which Himiko's soul is transferred into a new body, destroying the host's soul in the process, and that Mathias intends to sacrifice Sam as the next vessel.

Upon returning to the crew, Lara learns that Whitman has betrayed them and handed Sam over to Mathias. Lara, Reyes, and Jonah pursue them to the monastery, where Lara arrives in time to witness Whitman being killed by the Oni.

Fighting her way through the monastery and the remaining Solarii and Stormguard, Lara confronts Mathias at the summit during the ritual. She shoots and kills him with her signature dual-wield style, before destroying Himiko's remains to save Sam and end the ritual. With Himiko's soul destroyed, the storms dissipate, and Lara, Sam, Jonah, and Reyes are rescued by a passing cargo ship. As they sail away from Yamatai, Lara states that she will continue exploring the world's myths, and she is not returning home just yet.

== Development ==
Following Tomb Raider: Underworld, Crystal Dynamics was split into two teams; one beginning work on the next sequential pillar of the Tomb Raider franchise, the other focusing on the newly created spin-off Lara Croft series (debuting with Lara Croft and the Guardian of Light in 2010). Following pre-announcement media hype while the game's title was under embargo, in November 2010, Square Enix filed for trademark of the slogan for the new Tomb Raider game; "A Survivor is Born". Square Enix revealed in December that Tomb Raider was in production for nearly 2 years. Studio head Darrell Gallagher said that the new title is unlike anything what was before, describing it as an origin story of Lara Croft and her journey on a new way.

In January 2012, when asked if the game would be available on Nintendo's Wii U console, Crystal Dynamics global brand director Karl Stewart responded that there were no plans to have the game available on that platform. According to Stewart, the reason for this was that "it would not be right" for the game to simply be ported, as the developers built the game to be platform-specific before the Wii U was announced, and also mentioned that if they started building the game for the platform, the team would have build it very differently and with unique functionality. The multiplayer mode was created by Canadian video game development studio Eidos-Montréal, known for making Deus Ex: Human Revolution. That May, the game was delayed and was scheduled for the first quarter of 2013. Darrell Gallagher said that they were "doing things that are completely new" for this title and was the reason for delay.

=== Animated model ===
Lara Croft's model is animated using compiled performance capture, a technique used in the previous installment Tomb Raider: Underworld. The game was built on Crystal Dynamics' game engine called "Foundation". Lara's face is based on that of model Megan Farquhar. "Turning Point" CGI teaser trailer premiered at the E3 held in June 2011, emphasizing the release date was to be in the third quarter of 2012. The trailer was produced by Square Enix's CGI studio Visual Works.

=== Voice cast ===
Keeley Hawes did not return as Lara Croft for 2013's Tomb Raider, after working on Tomb Raider: Legend, Anniversary, Underworld and Lara Croft and the Guardian of Light. She reprised the role of Lara in the downloadable game Lara Croft and the Temple of Osiris, which was released in December 2014. Crystal Dynamics was said to be auditioning dozens of voice actresses. The voice actress of Lara Croft was revealed to be Camilla Luddington in June 2012.

=== Gameplay showcases ===
The gameplay trailer was released online in May 2012, showcasing more action-based gameplay along with varying plot elements. The trailer confirmed the presence of several other non-playable characters besides Lara on the island, many of which appear to be part of a menacing organization. On 4 June, at Microsoft's E3 2012 press conference, a new gameplay demonstration was shown, depicting environmental destruction and other interactivity, stealth combat using a bow and arrow, quick-time events and parachuting. During the summer, gameplay was shown of Lara hunting, exploring the island and killing for the first time. They were shown at Eurogamer Expo at London on 27 September. On 8 December, a new trailer was shown during Spike Video Game Awards. At the beginning, an introduction was made by Camilla Luddington and during the event, the trailer was followed by a musical orchestra, led by music composer Jason Graves. The next week, IGN presented: Tomb Raider Week. Each day from Monday to Friday, previews, features and trailers were released, showing more details for the upgrading system, survival tools and challenge tombs. Tomb Raider went gold on 8 February 2013.

== Music ==
Tomb Raider (Original Soundtrack)

Soundtrack album by Jason Graves
- Released: 15 March 2014
- Genre: Video game soundtrack
- Length: 74:55
- Label: Sumthing Else Music Works

Tomb Raider's soundtrack was composed by Jason Graves, whose previous work includes Dead Space and its sequels, F.E.A.R. 3 and Star Trek: Legacy. The Tomb Raider: Original Soundtrack was released on 5 March 2013, alongside the game's worldwide release. The album was released to critical acclaim, with multiple sites including Forbes and the magazine Film Score Monthly giving it high praise.

A podcast was released by Game Informer in December 2010, featuring a "sneak peek at a track from the game itself" composed by Aleksandar Dimitrijevic. Crystal Dynamics global brand director, Karl Stewart, clarified Game Informer's statement, confirming that Alex Dimitrijevic was hired to score the trailer, but they did not find the official composer for the game. After the trailer's première in June 2011, Stewart stated in regard to the final Turning Point score that "...this piece is not a piece that [Alex Dimitrijevic]'s worked on". Meagan Marie, community manager at Crystal Dynamics, expressed on the Tomb Raider blog that their goal was to release a soundtrack. Stewart added that "this is a completely new composer and somebody who we've brought in to work on the game as well as this [trailer] piece" and that "we're going to make a bigger announcement later in the year".

In the Making of Turning Point, sound designer Alex Wilmer explained that the unannounced composer had remotely directed an in-house concert violinist to perform the "very intimate" piece. In the fourth Crystal Habit podcast which premiered at the Tomb Raider blog in October 2011, Marie spoke to Wilmer and lead sound designer Jack Grillo about their collaboration with the unannounced composer. Grillo stated that "we're doing this overture... where we're taking an outline of the narrative structure and having our composer create different themes and textures that would span the entire game" while Wilmer emphasised that the composer's music will dynamically adapt in-game; scored "...emotionally so that it reacts instantly to what happens".

In an episode of The Final Hours of Tomb Raider on YouTube, the composer was revealed as Jason Graves. Apart from his trademark orchestral style, Graves wished to create a signature sound that would impress on players and stand out when heard. Along with using objects like mallets to create odd musical sounds, Graves, with the help of neighbouring architect Matt McConnell, created a special percussion instrument that would create a variety of odd signature sounds to mix in with the rest of the orchestral score. Although the location was set in the locale of Japan, Graves did not want Japanese instrumentation: instead, he chose sounds and themes that would be indicative of the scavengers on the island, who came from multiple regions of the globe. Using different percussion instruments in different ways, he was able to create the feeling of "founds sounds".

== Release ==
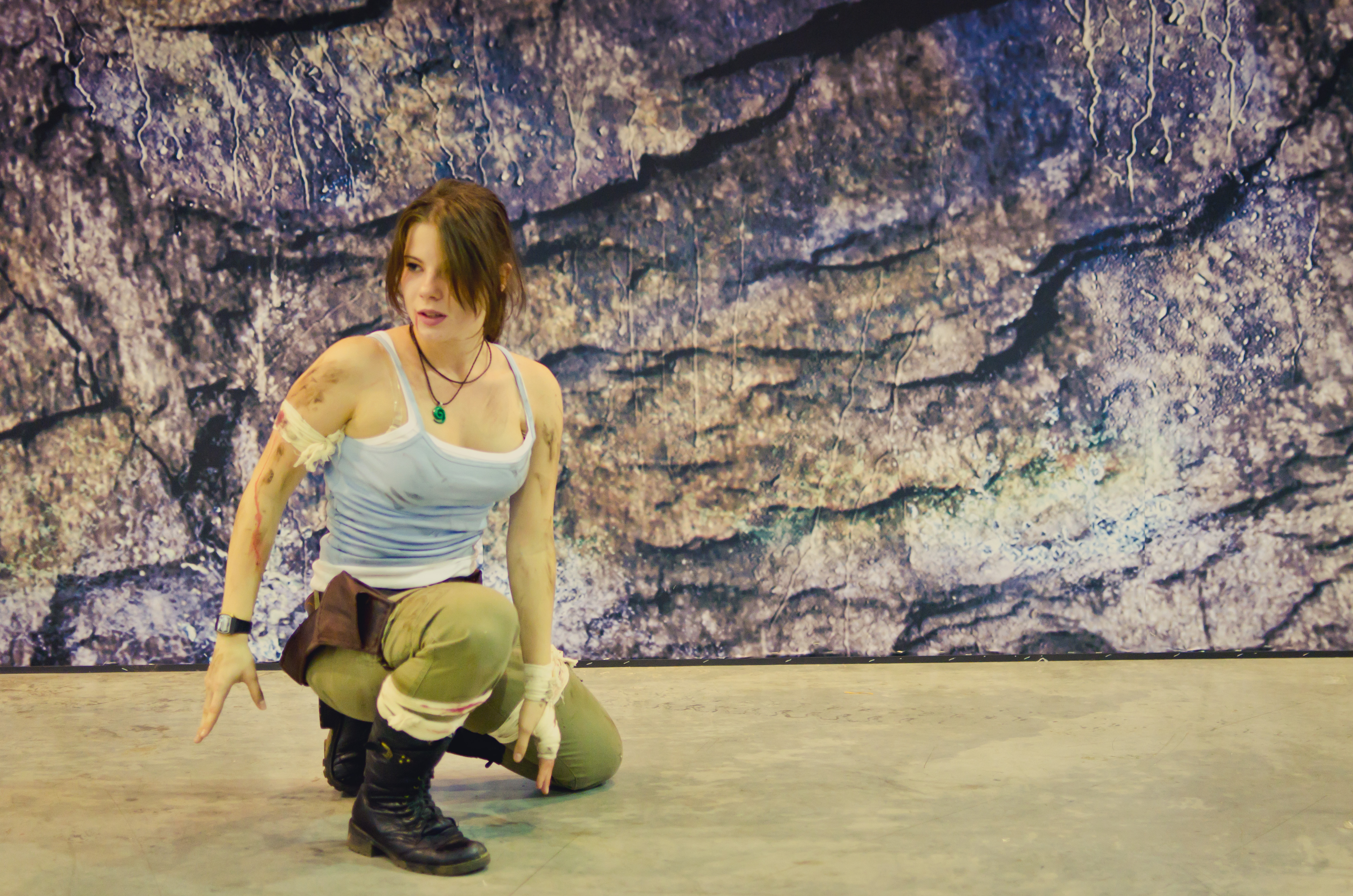
Promotion at IgroMir 2011

Tomb Raider was released as scheduled on 5 March 2013 for PlayStation 3, Xbox 360 and Microsoft Windows, but was released earlier in Australia on 1 March. On 25 April, Tomb Raider was released in Japan. A ported version of the game to the Mac OS X was released by Feral Interactive on 23 January 2014.

Tomb Raider: Definitive Edition, a graphically updated version containing new control features , a higher framerate, and all downloadable content, was released worldwide in January 2014 for PlayStation 4 and Xbox One. Tomb Raider: Game of the Year Edition, a different version also including all bonuses but without the graphical enhancements, was also released that month for Xbox 360 and PlayStation 3 and PC. Tomb Raider: Definitive Edition was also released for Windows in April 2024 exclusively for the Microsoft Store. Ports for Nintendo Switch and Nintendo Switch 2 were announced and released by Aspyr on 18 November 2025. An iOS and Android port was released by Feral Interactive on 12 February 2026.

Unlike the previous installments that received a T rating, Tomb Raider is the first game in the series to receive an M rating by the ESRB, due to blood and gore, intense violence, and strong language.

=== Pre-release incentives and retail editions ===
Prior to the game's release, various stores offered extra items as a way of attracting customers to order the game from their store. In North America, GameStop offered the in-game Challenge Tomb. Best Buy orders received the graphic novel Tomb Raider: The Beginning. These orders also came with the Aviatrix Skin as well as the Shanty Town multiplayer map. Walmart orders received a free digital download of Lara Croft and the Guardian of Light, access to a real-life scavenger hunt, the Shanty Town multiplayer map and an exclusive Guerrilla Skin outfit. Pre-orders from Microsoft Store received 1600 Microsoft Points for Xbox Live.

Customers ordering from Amazon received access to the Tomb Raider: The Final Hours Edition, including with a 32-page art book, an in-game Hunter Skin for Lara, and a digital copy of Geoff Keighley's The Final Hours of Tomb Raider for the Kindle Fire. Customers received the Shanty Town multiplayer map and an access code to a real-life scavenger hunt. Customers who purchased from Steam received a free copy of Lara Croft and the Guardian of the Light, a Challenge Tomb entitled Tomb of the Lost Adventurer and the Shanty Town multiplayer map. Steam offered three exclusive bonus Team Fortress 2 items.

In the United Kingdom, ShopTo.net also offered the graphic novel Tomb Raider: The Beginning. Orders from Amazon.co.uk received the Shanty Town multiplayer map.

Exclusive for Europe is the Survival Edition. This edition comes with a mini art book, double sided map of the in-game island, CD soundtrack, an exclusive weapons pack, and a survival pouch. The Collector's Edition for Europe contains everything from the Survival Edition along with an 8" Play Arts Kai Lara Croft figurine in a metal box. The Collector's Edition for North America is similar to the European one, but instead of a mini art book and a survival pouch it contains three iron-on badges and a lithograph.

The Survival Edition from Steam includes a digital 32-page art book, 10 downloadable tracks from the Tomb Raider soundtrack, a digital double sided map of the game's island, a digital comic, the Guerilla Skin outfit and three in-game weapons from Hitman: Absolution.

In the United Kingdom, Game offered the exclusive Explorer Edition bundle, which included an exploration-themed Challenge Tomb and a skill upgrade. Exclusive to Tesco was the Combat Strike Pack, which included three weaponry upgrades and a skill upgrade.

A limited edition wireless controller for the Xbox 360 was released on 5 March 2013. A download code for an Xbox exclusive playable Tomb Raider multiplayer character was included.

=== Downloadable content ===
At E3 2012, during Microsoft's press conference, Crystal Dynamics' Darrell Gallagher unveiled that Xbox 360 users would get early access to downloadable content (DLC). In March 2013, Xbox Live users had early access to the "Caves & Cliffs" map pack. The map pack consisted of three new Tomb Raider multiplayer maps, entitled "Scavenger Caverns", "Cliff Shantytown" and "Burning Village". The pack later became available for PSN and Steam users in April. The "1939" multiplayer map pack was released for Xbox 360, PS3 and PC, consisting of two new multiplayer maps, entitled "Dogfight" and "Forest Meadow". Later in April, Square Enix released a Japanese Language Pack on Steam. A multiplayer DLC pack was released on 7 May, entitled "Shipwrecked", on Xbox Live, PSN and Steam, offering two additional multiplayer maps, "Lost Fleet" and "Himiko's Cradle". Additionally, a single player outfit pack was released on Xbox Live. The pack contained the Demolition, Sure-Shot and Mountaineer outfits.

== Reception ==
Reception

Aggregate score
Aggregator	Score
Metacritic	PS3: 87/100; PC: 86/100; X360: 86/100; XONE: 86/100; PS4: 85/100 iOS: 83/100; NS2: 73/100

Review scores
Publication	Score
Eurogamer	8/10
Famitsu	38/40
Game Informer	9.25/10
GameSpot	8.5/10
GamesRadar+	4.5/5
GameTrailers	8.5/10
GameZone	9/10
IGN	9.1/10
Joystiq	4/5
Nintendo Life	8/10
PlayStation Official Magazine – UK	8/10
The Guardian	4/5
Digital Spy	5/5

Tomb Raider received critical acclaim. (Note: Attributed to multiple references:) On review aggregator website Metacritic, it garnered "generally favorable reviews". GamesMaster magazine gave the game a score of 90%, as well as the "GamesMaster Gold award" (awarded to games that manage a score of 90% or above). The editor regarded the quality of the visuals, the length and depth of the gameplay, and the "spectacular" last third of the game as the highlights. IGN's Keza MacDonald spoke extremely positively, stating that they felt the game was "exciting" and "beautifully presented", included "great characterization" and more depth. They gave the game an overall score of 9.1 out of 10, the highest score they have given a game in the series since 1996's Tomb Raider, describing it as "amazing" and concluding that the game "did justice" to both the character and franchise. Ryan Taljonick of GamesRadar lauded the location's setting and environment, and expressed that the areas never feel like a rehash of another. Taljonick also felt that the game had great pacing, and was unrivaled by any other game in the genre. Furthermore, the reviewer considered Lara's character development as "an integral part" of the whole game's experience, and concluded that Tomb Raider "is a fantastic game and an excellent origin story for one of gaming's original treasure seekers". Australian TV show Good Game praised the game: it was rated 10/10 by both hosts, becoming the eighth game in the show's seven-year run to do so. Giant Bomb gave the game four stars out of five, only having a minor issues with the game's tone at conflict with its action.

One of the criticisms of the game stemmed from a disparity between the emotional thrust of the story and the actions of the player, with GameTrailers' Justin Speer pointing out that while the story attempted to characterise Lara Croft as vulnerable and uncomfortable with killing, the player was encouraged to engage enemies aggressively and use brutal tactics to earn more experience points. Speer felt that this paradoxical approach ultimately let the game down as it undermined Lara's character to the point where he found it difficult to identify with her at all. IGN's Keza MacDonald highlighted the same, but was less critical of it than Speer, pointing out that both Lara and the player had to adapt quickly to killing in order to survive. However, Game Informer's Matt Miller noted that the game offered the player several options for progressing through its combat situations, and that the player could avoid open conflict entirely if they chose to do so. He praised the behaviour and presence of the enemies for the way they felt like they had actual tasks to perform on the island, rather than being clusters of polygons whose only function was to be killed by the player in order for them to progress. While on the subject of character development, GamesRadar's Ryan Taljonick expressed that the supporting characters were underdeveloped relative to Lara Croft, describing them as generic and, while rarely annoying, not memorable.

While many reviews applauded the single-player campaign, the multiplayer mode bore the brunt of the game's criticism, with MacDonald, Speer and Miller all finding fault with it, describing it as lackluster and stating that the difference between the developer's vision for the game mode and the finished product made it difficult to enjoy.

Tomb Raider: Definitive Edition received positive reviews. Game Informer's Matt Helgeson considered the updated graphics at native 1080p resolution as a good addition to the core Tomb Raider experience. He cited some differences in graphics between the two versions and noted a bit smoother frame-rate on the PlayStation 4 version. James Stephanie Sterling of The Escapist was less receptive to the Definitive Edition; she praised the visual improvements, but felt that nominal content additions to the single-player experience and the game's price point made it difficult to recommend to players outside of those who had not played the original version. GameZone's Matt Liebl gave Tomb Raider: Definitive Edition a 9/10 and recommended for the players who never played the original version.

Prior to the game's release, news of an attempted rape plot element drew ire and led to multiple op-ed pieces. A developer interview described an early cutscene as an attempted "rape" that proves formative in Croft's genesis story, but the developer later reiterated that sexual assault was not a theme of the game and that the executive producer had misspoken. Sexual assault and women had already been a volatile topic in games journalism. Tomb Raider's lead writer later reflected that the controversy was the result of misinformation.

=== Sales ===
The game sold more than 1 million copies less than 48 hours after its release. In the United Kingdom, Tomb Raider debuted at number one on the charts, and became the biggest UK title launch in 2013, surpassing the sales of Aliens: Colonial Marines, before being overtaken by Grand Theft Auto V. Tomb Raider set a new record for the franchise, more than doubling the debut sales of Tomb Raider: Legend. Furthermore, the Xbox 360 and PlayStation 3 versions of Tomb Raider set new week one records as the fastest-selling individual formats of any Tomb Raider title so far, a record which was previously held by Tomb Raider: The Angel of Darkness. Tomb Raider topped the charts in France, Ireland, Italy, the Netherlands, Norway, and the United States. In the United States, Tomb Raider was the second best-selling title of March, excluding download sales, behind BioShock Infinite. In Japan, Tomb Raider debuted at number four with 35,250 units sold.

Three weeks after its release on March 26, Square Enix announced that the game sold 3.4 million copies worldwide at retail, but has failed to reach predicted sales targets. Crystal Dynamics however defended Tomb Raider's sales, stating the reboot had the "most successful launch" of any game that year in addition to setting a new record for highest sales in the franchise's history. On 22 August, Darrell Gallagher, head of product development and studios for Square Enix, said to Gamasutra that the game had sold more than 4 million copies worldwide. In the United Kingdom, Tomb Raider was the 6th best-selling boxed game of 2013. In January 2014, Scot Amos, executive producer of Tomb Raider, revealed that at the end of 2013 the game achieved profitability. On 3 February, Tomb Raider: Definitive Edition, a re-release for PlayStation 4 and Xbox One, debuted atop the UK charts. Gallagher predicted on March 6 that the game would surpass 6 million units by the end of the month. By April 2015, Gallagher announced that the sales had reached 8.5 million, making the game the best-selling Tomb Raider title to date. As of October 2021, the game has sold more than 14.5 million copies.

=== Awards ===
The game was nominated for numerous best of E3 awards. (Note: Attributed to multiple references:)

List of awards and nominations
Year	Award	Category	Result	Ref.
2013	VGX 2013	Game of the Year	Nominated	
2013	VGX 2013	Best Action-Adventure Game	Nominated	
2013	VGX 2013	Best Xbox Game	Nominated	
2013	VGX 2013	Best PlayStation Game	Nominated	
2013	VGX 2013	Best Voice Actress (Camilla Luddington)	Nominated	
2013	National Academy of Video Game Trade Reviewers (NAVGTR) awards	Control Precision	Won	
2013	National Academy of Video Game Trade Reviewers (NAVGTR) awards	Original Dramatic Score, Franchise	Won	
2014	17th Annual D.I.C.E. Awards	Adventure Game of the Year	Nominated	
2014	17th Annual D.I.C.E. Awards	Outstanding Achievement in Story	Nominated	
2014	14th Annual Game Developers Choice Awards	Game of the Year	Nominated	
2014	14th Annual Game Developers Choice Awards	Best Design	Nominated	
2014	14th Annual Game Developers Choice Awards	Best Narrative	Nominated	
2014	10th British Academy Video Games Awards	Action & Adventure	Nominated	
2014	10th British Academy Video Games Awards	Audio Achievement	Nominated	
2014	10th British Academy Video Games Awards	Game Design	Nominated	

== Sequels ==
Tomb Raider: The Beginning, a 48-page hardcover graphic novel, written by the game's lead writer Rhianna Pratchett and published by Dark Horse Comics and telling the story of "how the ill-fated voyage of the Endurance came to be" was released with multiple editions in 2013 and was later included with the Game of the Year Edition and Definitive Edition.

Comic book writer Gail Simone was hired in 2013 to continue the reboot's story in a line of comics published by Dark Horse Comics. The series, simply called Tomb Raider, is set between the game and its sequel and the story leads directly into a sequel.

Later, at the beginning of August, Square Enix's Western CEO Phil Rogers confirmed that a sequel to Tomb Raider was being developed for unspecified next-gen consoles. In an interview later that year, Brian Horton, the senior art director for Crystal Dynamics, said that the sequel would tell the next chapter of Lara's development. During Microsoft's E3 2014 presentation, Rise of the Tomb Raider was announced as a sequel, initially exclusive to Xbox consoles at launch. The exclusivity was timed, which meant that the title would see a release on other platforms after an unspecified period of time. Microsoft published the title for its release on Xbox consoles. Rise of the Tomb Raider was released on 10 November 2015 for Xbox One and Xbox 360, and 28 January 2016 for Microsoft Windows. The PlayStation 4 version was released on 11 October 2016, titled the 20 Year Celebration, as it was released 20 years after the original Tomb Raider game. This version includes all of the previously released downloadable content.

A third installment, Shadow of the Tomb Raider, was released in September 2018.

== Film adaptation ==
The 2018 Tomb Raider reboot film adaptation, directed by Roar Uthaug, is in part based on the video game. Alicia Vikander, who portrays Lara Croft, was cast alongside actors Daniel Wu and Walton Goggins. The story follows Lara Croft's search for her father. The film was released on 16 March 2018.
