= Tomb Raider: Underworld =

2008 video game

- Developer: Crystal Dynamics (Note: Additional development and Wii and PS2 porting by Buzz Monkey Software. PC and PS3 versions ported by Nixxes Software. DS version developed by Santa Cruz Games. OS X version ported by Feral Interactive. Mobile versions developed by Distinctive Developments.)
- Publisher: Eidos Interactive (Note: Co-published in North America by Warner Bros. Interactive Entertainment, Japanese release published by Spike, Mac OS X version by Feral Interactive and mobile versions by EA Mobile)
- Director: Eric Lindstrom
- Producer: Alex Jones
- Designer: Harley White-Wiedow
- Programmer: Rob Pavey
- Artist: Patrick Sirk
- Writers: Eric Lindstrom; Toby Gard
- Composers: Colin O'Malley; Troels Brun Folmann
- Series: Tomb Raider
- Platforms: Nintendo DS; PlayStation 3; Wii; Windows; Xbox 360; Mobile; PlayStation 2; OS X
- Release: Windows, 360, PS3, Wii, DS: NA: 18 November 2008; EU: 21 November 2008; AU: 4 December 2008; Mobile; 3 December 2008; PS2: EU: 23 January 2009; AU: 12 February 2009; NA: 3 March 2009; OS X 14 June 2012
- Genre: Action-adventure
- Mode: Single-player

Tomb Raider: Underworld is a 2008 action-adventure video game developed by Crystal Dynamics and published by Eidos Interactive for Windows, PlayStation 3, Xbox 360, Wii and Nintendo DS in November 2008. Later versions were released for mobile in December 2008, PlayStation 2 in 2009, and OS X in 2012. Various companies ported or developed the different versions. The ninth overall entry in the Tomb Raider series and third and final in the Legend trilogy, Underworld follows archaeologist-adventurer Lara Croft as she searches for Mjolnir, an artefact key to entering the realm of Helheim, while confronting adversaries from her past. Gameplay features Lara navigating levels set across the world through platforming, fighting enemies and solving puzzles to progress.

Production of Underworld began in 2006 following the release of Tomb Raider: Legend, and was developed in parallel with Anniversary (2007). The scenario was co-written by director Eric Lindstrom and series co-creator Toby Gard; Gard left Crystal Dynamics the following year. The gameplay was redesigned around a principle of Lara's abilities, with her actions created using motion capture for the first time. A new game engine was created for the project, with the team having troubles transitioning onto next-generation hardware and staff shortages due to production of Anniversary. Announced in January 2008 for next-generation hardware, it was delayed into November and also announced for then-current generation hardware. Xbox 360-exclusive downloadable content was released in 2009.

The game received mostly positive reviews from critics, with praise for the environments, story, puzzles, exploration, graphics and the less linear style of gameplay, although criticism was directed at its camera and combat system. It sold below expectations, though ultimately went on to sell over three million copies worldwide. It was the final Tomb Raider title published by Eidos Interactive prior to its 2009 acquisition and rebranding by Square Enix. Following Underworld, Crystal Dynamics rebooted the series a second time, with the subsequent game releasing in 2013. The upcoming Tomb Raider: Catalyst (planned to release in 2028) will serve as a sequel to Underworld, while also unifying the previous continuities into a single timeline.

== Gameplay ==
Lara Croft using the dual-target feature

Tomb Raider: Underworld is a single-player action-adventure game where the player controls the protagonist, Lara Croft, from a third-person perspective, through a variety of locations around the world. Lara can jump, climb and shimmy along ledges and vertical poles or ladders, crawl through small spaces, and swing on ropes and horizontal poles. Some areas have climbable surfaces she can scale, and some ledges allow her to stand on them and shimmey along. Other abilities include wall jumping between two adjascent surfaces, interacting with objects and switches, using a grappling hook to latch onto special rings for both puzzle solving and environmental traversal, and swim and dive underwater for a limited time. Different button combinations can create more moves such as a roll and swan dive. Puzzles revolve around Lara finding keys to mechanisms in the environment, or manipulating different mechanisms to trigger larger elements within and around the environment. There are also traps which need to be avoided, some of them involved in the puzzle design. During some levels, Lara has access to an all-terrain bike which is used in both navigation and puzzle solving.

During combat, Lara automatically locks on to enemies and fires with her equipped gun, with the player able to switch to another target within range and move freely to avoid enemy attacks. When using two weapons, she is able to target up to two enemies at once. Through most of the game Lara has access to seven weapons, selectable from the main menu; her default twin pistols with infinite ammunition, and a shotgun, submachine guns, assault rifle, speargun, tranquillizer gun, and sticky grenades all with limited ammunition. During the last two levels, Lara also has access to the magical artefact Mjolnir, which instantly kills most enemies. Lara's health is represented by a coloured figure, with the game resetting to a checkpoint if she dies; medipacks and artefact collectables heal her, and hard-to-reach relics collected through the game raise her health cap. The difficulty setting can be tailored, with puzzle, combat and platforming difficulties each having sliders influencing their respective challenge in-game. There is also an option on Lara's PDA to receive tips about navigation or solving puzzles. A sonar map is accessible through the PDA, showing a generated 3D representation of Lara's environment.

The PlayStation 2 and Wii versions are generally similar to other versions, but with smaller environments and puzzle structure due to hardware limitations; the Wii version also incorporates dedicated combat controls and puzzles revoling around the motion controls. The Nintendo DS (DS) is a two-dimensional (2D) side-scrolling platformer, with Lara navigating self-contained areas while progressing through each level. There are two mobile versions with differing gameplay styles; one is a 2D side-scrolling platformer similar to earlier mobile Tomb Raider games, while the other uses 3D graphics and incorporates platforming and combat elements similar to the home console versions though Lara is restricted to moving forward or backward and some movements are automatic triggered using button prompts.

== Plot ==
The story begins in medias res; Lara Croft navigates her home Croft Manor after an explosion, then is shot at by her tech assistant Zip. One week earlier, Lara is investigating a sunken island in the Mediterranean Sea as part of her search for Avalon, hoping it will lead her to an explanation for the disappearance of her mother Amelia and salvage her father Richard's academic reputation despite the scepticism of Zip and her research assistant Alister. The island houses ruins dubbed "Niflheim", one of the many Norse underworlds, and Lara discovers one of the gauntlets attributed to the god Thor to wield Mjolnir. While ambushed by mercenaries sent by rival Amanda Evert, Lara recovers the gauntlet, which has shaped itself to her hand. On Amanda's ship she also meets an imprisoned Jacqueline Natla, former ruler of Atlantis presumed dead after their last encounter. Natla reveals that Amelia was sent to "Helhiem"−another name for Avalon−and directs Lara to ruins in Thailand, hinting that her father also searched for Mjolnir before she is taken by Amanda as the ship sinks due to an explosion caused by the mercenary leader who ambushed Lara.

In Thailand, Lara navigates the ruins of "Bhogavati" and finds more ancient ruins that housed a gauntlet; Richard was sent there by Natla, but removed the gauntlet and destroyed a map showing the location of Thor's relics. From the use of his initials referencing her grandfather, Lara deduces that Richard hid the gauntlet in Croft Manor. Finding Richard's study in Croft Manor's catacombs, Lara finds the gauntlet and a tape-recorded message from Richard, revealing Helheim contained a powerful weapon and that he destroyed the map after recording it to prevent its use. She also encounters a pair of Thralls, undead guardians of Thor's relics created from eitr. Croft Manor is bombed, and Lara learns from Zip that the bomber, who looked identical to her, stole the magical stone Amanda used during Legend. Lara then encounters a Doppelgänger—a being modelled to look like Lara—who shoots Alister and flees; despite Zip's protests, Lara continues her quest so she can use Mjolnir to kill Natla. In the ruins of "Xibalba" in Mexico, Lara finds both Thor's belt−which powers the gauntlets and is protected by more Thralls−and ancient carvings detailing the myth of Jörmungandr, who will flood the world before fighting Thor, with both dying. In the ruin of "Valhalla" on Jan Mayen, Lara recovers Mjolnir, then confronts Natla.

Natla provides Lara with the coordinates of Helheim, but points out that only she knows the ritual to prepare its gates, so Lara reluctantly strikes a bargain and frees her from her cell. Amanda attempts to stop her, but the Doppelgänger attacks and apparently kills Amanda. Lara dives to the ruins of Helheim under the Arctic Sea, and with Natla's preparation opens its entrance with Mjolnir. Lara then discovers Amelia is turned into a Thrall and is forced to shoot her. Natla appears and reveals that she killed Richard after his betrayal in Thailand, then sets the Doppelgänger on Lara before leaving to awaken Jörmungandr, revealed as a metaphor for the Earth's faultlines; Natla intends to activate an ancient device above the faultlines' weakpoint and trigger apocalyptic volcanic activity. Amanda appears and apparently throws the Doppelgänger to its death, allying with Lara to stop Natla's plan. Lara finds the device and destabilises it, then throws Mjolnir at Natla, knocking her into a lake of eitr. Lara and Amanda then use the chamber's dais travel device, escaping to the Nepalese monastery where Amelia first disappeared. Amanda tries to restart their fight, but backs down and leaves when Lara refuses; before she leaves, Lara bids goodbye to her mother.

The downloadable content episodes "Beneath the Ashes" and "Lara's Shadow" are set after these events. The Doppelgänger, revealed to have survived, finds a disfigured Natla and is compelled through the magical command "Okh Eshivar" to take her to the Doppelgänger's birthplace in an ancient ruin. After the Doppelgänger restores the ruin's healing technology, Natla orders the Doppelgänger to kill Lara then itself. At Croft Manor, Lara finds notes on a Thrall-creating stone carved with the "Okh Eshivar" command. After a Thrall attacks from a cavern, she descends deeper into the catacombs and finds the stone. The Doppelgänger then attacks, and Lara uses the command phrase bringing the Doppelgänger under her control. After Lara questions the Doppelgänger's nature and the Doppelgänger states that they are both driven by something beyond their control−compulsion for the Doppelgänger and obsession for Lara−Lara frees the Doppelgänger from all commands and sends it back to Natla as a means of avenging Alister. Back at the ruin, the Doppelgänger destroys the device, then watches as a trapped Natla is drowned in a rising pool of eitr.

== Development ==
Planning for Underworld began during the final production stages of Legend in 2006, with the team feeling they had a strong-enough fan response and set of gameplay concepts to begin planning ahead. There were also features that could not be included in Legend which were envisioned as being possible in a sequel. Eric Lindstrom, who had previously worked as a scenario writer on Legend, acted as creative director. Alex Jones, later acting as a co-producer for DmC: Devil May Cry (2013), acted as the project's senior producer. The other staff included Harley White-Wiedow as lead designer, lead programmer Rob Pavey, and Patrick Sirk acted as art director. Production lasted roughly two and a half years.

Development was troubled by multiple factors. Production of Underworld ran parallel to Anniversary, with Anniversary developed by a separate team based on the Legend game engine. Due to this, Underworld suffered due to staff shortages. For Underworld, a new engine was created that was later dubbed the CDC engine. They had trouble adapting to the new technology, as the engine had to be built from scratch rather than carrying over the earlier code from Legend. Other troubles included the original lead level designer dying in the middle of production, and another core staff member needing to leave to have her baby. The ship escape Lara experiences in the opening level, intended to feel like an action movie, was almost cut from the game several times due to its technical challenges. Lindstrom later called the game's successful development "a miracle" due to the difficulties of transitioning onto next-generation hardware and the staff limitations. While proud of their achievement, he regretted not being able to have a more polished product by release, attributing this failing mainly to over-ambition from himself and other team members.

The gameplay was built around the question "What could Lara do?": while carrying over the established platforming and action, the team wanted to remove as many arbitrary barriers as possible, allowing Lara to traverse the environment in a more natural manner. They also wanted to steer away from the corridor-style levels of their earlier games and have an open area with some freedom of choice for players, and better incorporate Lara's toolset such as the grappling line into puzzles. Some gameplay elements planned for Underworld were first shown off in Anniversary, with Lindstrom working with that game's director Jason Botta to test them out on the fan base before Underworld released. The separated elements of its difficulty settings were implemented to give players more control over their gameplay experience. For the enemy artificial intelligence (AI), Crystal Dynamics licensed the NavPower middleware from BabelFlux, allowing for more variety in its AI behaviour. Adrenaline Moments were designed as an alternative to the previously used quick time events which were falling out of fashion in the gaming world. Adrenaline Moments allowed the team to create similar cinematic moments without removing player interaction. Designing the feature, which had slow motion elements, presented a challenge as the team did not want it compared to the bullet time used in other media.

After hand-animation was used for Legend and Anniversary, for Underworld Lara's animations were created using motion capture, chosen by the team to allow for a more fluid and natural style of movement compared to her earlier games. Her motion capture animations were then blended together using hand animation to create smooth transitions between different gameplay stances. Keeley Hawes returned from Legend and Anniversary to voice Lara. Her motion capture was performed by Olympic gymnast Heidi Moneymaker and stuntwoman Helena Barrett. To portray her at trade shows, Eidos hired model Alison Carroll. Carroll was the last live model for Lara.

=== Scenario and world design ===
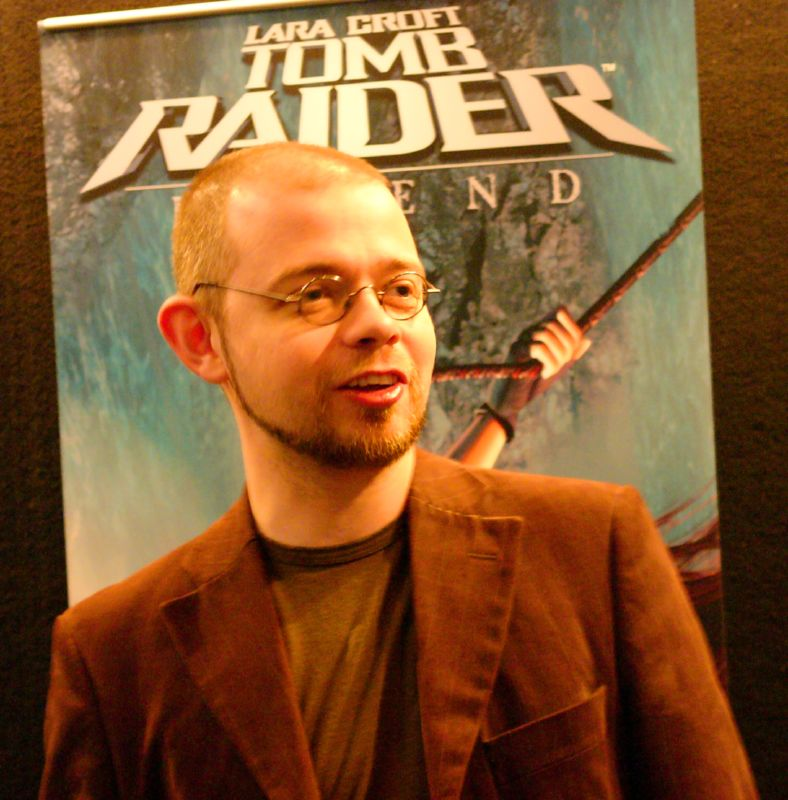
Toby Gard, a key figure for the series and credited creator of Lara Croft, at the 2005 Electronic Entertainment Expo; Gard co-wrote the story and directed the cinematics.

Underworld forms part of a trilogy together with Legend and Anniversary. The scenario was co-written by Lindstrom and Lara's credited co-creator Toby Gard; the script was written by Lindstrom. Gard was credited on the game as cinematic director. Additional writing work was done by the Freeman Group, led by screenwriter David Freeman. Underworld was Gard's last project at Crystal Dynamics before leaving in 2009, and is his last Tomb Raider game to date. In an interview that year, he felt his influence on Lara had growing less since Legend due to the increasing size of the team and the input of the director and publisher, feeling it was the right time to leave Lara behind for other game projects. The story delivery was intended to balance the dialogue-heavy approach of Legend and more solitary atmosphere of Anniversary, in addition to the atmosphere being darker and having environmental weather and effects tying into the story. This was partly in response to negative feedback from players of Legend about Alister and Zip talking too much during gameplay.

The game's title "Underworld" had multiple meanings; she was visiting multiple underworld locations across different cultures as part of her adventure, reaching a darker part of her "internal journey", and the tone of the adventure and locations was more sombre than earlier games. The storyline of Underworld was made "epic" and dramatic, with the team wanting to raise the stakes. While a single location with multiple ruins to explore was considered, the team wanted a world-spanning adventure that would take in multiple ruins themed around underworld legends worldwide, informing the game and story design from that point on.

Norse mythology was chosen as the unifying thread for the story, with additional mythologies building on that. Lindstrom made the initial decision of which mythology the game would use during pre-production talks with Gard, with the two then making the story as brief and entertaining as possible. The story also referenced similar myths appearing worldwide, something that had fascinated Gard for years. A central theme of the narrative was Lara's determination to uncover the truth behind Mjolnir, despite the risks of unleashing something of world-destroying power, calling into question the reasons behind and justification for her adventuring. While there was a trend for series to darken their tones to sometimes mixed reactions, Gard explained the tonal shift as a natural progression of the Legend trilogy. The storyline originally featured a colleague of Lara's father and his niece, who would be possessed by an artefact dubbed the Eye of Odin. The characters and artefact were cut from the game as it made the narrative too complicated, with the team wanting to focus on Natla's plan and associated roles of Amanda and the Doppelgänger.

Speaking about Lara's historically exaggerated figure, Lindstrom noted that they focused on making both Lara and the environments "larger than life", focusing on spectacle and making the character "credible" over being realistic. The enemies were split into three categories; normal wildlife that could be found in each region she visits, cryptids that were undiscovered and potentially influenced by the magic of the ruins such as the Nāga in Thailand and giant spiders in Mexico, and purely magical beings like the Thralls. The Thralls drew on two aspects of Thor's folklore, his human servants Þjálfi and Röskva, and his goats Tanngrisnir and Tanngnjóstr which would resurrect after being butchered and eaten if their bones were left intact.

When creating the environments, team members went on research trips to Mexico, Belize and Cambodia, taking thousands of reference photographs. Thailand, which was featured prominently in the game's marketing, was based direction on ruins from Cambodia and the team included plant life native to the area to create a realistic feel to the level. Thailand was always envisioned as the game's "deep, lush exotic jungle experience", with the amount of vegetation and detail causing problems with the frame rate when it was turned into in-game assets. Croft Manor was built using the versions from Legend as a reference, lessening work for the team and providing an easy tutorial area, though it needed the largest memory allocation of any environment. For the Southern Mexico area, which was described as the testbed scenario for the game as a whole, the team based it on a number of areas including Uxmal with the aim of featuring a grounded scenario of Lara exploring a lost Mayan temple complex. The area around Jan Mayan and Helheim was trimmed down from the initial concept, which would have included navigating an ice labyrinth with the all-terrain bike. Crystal Dynamics licensed Turtle, a middleware lighting software, from Illuminate Labs. Sirk stated that its use allowed for greater dynamic lighting for both the in-game environments and their concept art. An important factor in showing off the locals was the in-game camera, which at key points was designed to focus on specific areas and angles to evoke a sense of scale and wonder.

=== Music ===
The music was principally composed by Colin O'Malley, with Legend and Anniversary composer Troels Brun Folmann creating the main theme and supervising the soundtrack. O'Malley and Folmann had met on an earlier project creating a sample library, which they used when creating the soundtrack. The music for Underworld was purely orchestral and ambient in style, with some pieces that only played once to accompany specific sequences rather than looping, a style emulating Tomb Raider titles from the Core Design era. This direction was influenced by Lindstrom's vision for the overall style, with Folmann bringing in O'Malley based on these requirements due to his ability to work on emotional and orchestral tracks.

== Release ==
An entry designed for next-generation consoles was confirmed by Ian Livingstone of Eidos Interactive in 2006 after the release of Legend. The "Underworld" subtitle was trademarked in November 2007. The game was officially revealed and previewed to the press in January, initially confirmed for PlayStation 3 (PS3), Xbox 360 and Windows personal computers (PC). Prior to any official release date being announced, Eidos parent company SCi Games announced a delay alongside versions for PlayStation 2 (PS2), Wii and Nintendo DS. Its official title was revealed in February with a planned release "later" in 2008. During marketing in mid-2008, Eidos hired Luton Hoo and turned some interiors into a version of Croft Manor. A game demo was released for PC on 31 October through the game's website. Underworld was the last entry to be published by Eidos, who were bought and absorbed by Square Enix the following year. Crystal Dynamics decided to create a second series reboot, released in 2013 under the title Tomb Raider, additionally working on the spin-off title Lara Croft and the Guardian of Light.

While sharing the same story, many different versions of Underworld were developed for different platforms. Crystal Dynamics handled development for the 360 version. Nixxes Software, in addition to providing general development tools, handled the PC and PS3 versions. Buzz Monkey Software provided programming and animation support for the 360 and PS3 versions, and handled the ports to PS2 and Wii. Development of the Wii version was influenced by reviews and feedback of the Wii port of Anniversary, with the more positively received touch-based puzzles increasing in number. The gameplay was expanded in some areas with new zones, while the shooting controls were carried over from Anniversary. The DS version was developed by Santa Cruz Games. The DS version was built around the platform's limitations; most levels were presented as a 2D plain, and while Lara's model used 3D graphics much of the environment was built using 2D art. The side-scrolling genre was chosen to best fit Tomb Raider gameplay onto the platform. Lara's model used hand animation rather than motion capture and the levels were broken into small sections to allow for quick play sessions on the move, but the lighting used similar technology to the other versions. In both Nintendo hardware versions, care was taken to carry over as much of the established gameplay as possible. A version of the game was also developed for mobile devices, licensed out by Eidos to EA Mobile and developed by Distinctive Developments. The music and sound design was handled by High Score Studio. Feral Interactive created a port of the game for OS X.

The contents of the Tomb Raider: Underworld Ultimate Fan Pack

The PS3, 360, PC and DS versions were released in North America on 18 November, in Europe on 21 November, and in Australia on 4 December. A notable part of the European release was Eidos requesting that reviews scoring the game lower than an 8 or similar should not be released for a few days. In Australia, the game was distributed by the local branch of Atari. The PC version was released under the Games for Windows brand. The Wii version notably shipped with a bug where a key puzzle element which opened the path forward in the second level failed to appear, prompting Eidos to give advice on avoiding it to players and seek a solution for future printings. The mobile versions were released on 3 December 2008 by Electronic Arts. The PS2 version was released worldwide in 2009; in Europe on 23 January, 12 February in Australia, and 3 March in North America. A Japanese release through Spike was confirmed for 2009, initially for PS3, 360, Wii, PS2 and DS. It was released for PS3 and 360 on 29 January, and for PS2 and Wii on 23 April. The DS version went unreleased in the region. The OS X port was released digitally on 12 June 2012 by Feral Interactive.

Exclusive to EB Games Australia in Australia and New Zealand was the Tomb Raider: Underworld Ultimate Fan Pack, which was available on 360, PS3 and PC. The pack contained the retail version of the game, a Lara Croft calendar, a Lara Croft figurine, a Tomb Raider T-shirt, a trucker cap and a messenger bag. Exclusive to Game in the United Kingdom was the limited edition of Tomb Raider: Underworld, which was available on 360, PS3 and PC. The edition included a bonus disc, which contained behind-the-scenes documentary, promotional artwork, an exclusive soundtrack, videos and trailers. Themed merchandise was created based on the game, including figurines and books containing artwork from the games up to that point. The PS3 version of Underworld was bundled with ports of Legend and Anniversary in a collection dubbed The Tomb Raider Trilogy. The collection was published worldwide in March 2011.

=== Downloadable content ===
Prior to release, Crystal Dynamics and Eidos were approached by Microsoft to create exclusive DLC for the Xbox 360, with Lindstom describing the content as being entirely new rather than material held back from the main game. According to a later statement, Lindstrom said that some features were cut from the main game due to time constraints and were incorporated into the DLC, which he was pleased about. The design goal for "Beneath the Ashes" was to expand upon the gameplay concepts of the main game in a new environment, while "Lara's Shadow" gave the team an opportunity to create new gameplay mechanics for the Doppelgänger. While the narratives built on established plot points, they were intended as standalone experiences that would not fit into the main campaign. For the DLC, Eidos collaborated with fashion designers in Quebec to create outfits for Lara, one of them voted on by fans. Originally planned for release on 10 February 2009, the first episode "Beneath the Ashes" was delayed due to an unspecified technical issue. "Beneath the Ashes" was released on 24 February, while "Lara's Shadow" was released on 10 March.

== Reception ==
Reception

Aggregate score
| Aggregator | Score |
|---|---|
| Metacritic | (PC) 80/100 (X360) 76/100 (PS3) 75/100 (Wii) 70/100 (NDS) 70/100 |

Review scores
| Publication | Score |
|---|---|
| Edge | 8/10 |
| Famitsu | (PS3 & X360) 32/40 |
| GameSpot | (PS3 & X360) 7.0/10 (Wii) 6.5/10 (NDS) 5.5/10 |
| GamesRadar+ | 4.5/5 |
| IGN | (PC) 8.0/10 (X360) 7.5/10 (PS3) 7.4/10 (Wii) 6.5/10 (PS2) 4.0/10 |
| Nintendo Power | 7.0/10 |

Tomb Raider: Underworld received generally positive reviews from critics. The Xbox 360, PC and PlayStation 3 versions of the game were generally highly praised, with many critics comparing Underworld to older titles in the series, such as GamesRadar and The Guardian. In reviews, the environments have been widely praised, many reviewers also praised Lara's motion captured movements and the much less linear style of gameplay, while some criticisms aimed at its "haywire" camera angles and "dodgy" combat system.

IGN described the game as enjoyable for the puzzles, exploration and graphics. They went on to praise that quick time events were replaced with adrenaline moments and noted improvements in combat, such as the ability to aim at two enemies at once and new sticky bombs. Similarly, Edge described Underworld as a "rare game that manages to provide a real adventure to go along with its action", praising its frenetic pace and Lara's new abilities. However, GamesRadar marked the game down for "dodgy combat", but the exploration was highly praised. Nintendo Power and GamesRadar also praised the game's platforming elements. Despite mentions of camera issues and weaker combat, critics described it as "as good as Tomb Raider has ever been" and "the Tomb Raider we've been waiting for!"

The Wii and PlayStation 2 versions received mostly mixed to negative reviews. IGN commented the Wii version "is not a bad game" but they were critical of its puzzles, minimal combat and the game's length. GameSpot called Underworld as an enjoyable adventure, but was critical of bugs, camera issues, and the extras for Wii version. The PlayStation 2 version was called "an embarrassment to the franchise" by IGN. They went on to say that the version was such a poor conversion that it shouldn't have been released, criticising the game's bugs, linear gameplay and minimal combat.

Tomb Raider: Underworld received a BAFTA nomination in 2009. For Underworld's story, Lindstrom and Gard received a nomination for the WGAW's Videogame Writing Award. During the 12th Annual Interactive Achievement Awards, the Academy of Interactive Arts & Sciences nominated Tomb Raider: Underworld for "Outstanding Achievement in Character Performance" (Lara Croft) and "Outstanding Achievement in Visual Engineering".

=== Sales ===
In early 2009, Eidos said that Tomb Raider: Underworld sales failed to meet expectations, selling 1.5 million copies worldwide as of 31 December 2008. They later announced in February that the game had sold around 2.6 million copies worldwide. Also, on 8 May, Ian Livingstone, President of Eidos Interactive, said that Underworld has met their target expectations. The same month, Tomb Raider: Underworld was released as part of both the Xbox Classics and PS3 Platinum Range. In December 2011, Tomb Raider: Underworld was given away for free to subscribers of the PlayStation Plus service. As of September 2021, the game has sold an estimated 3.8 million copies.
