= NCAA Football 11 =

2010 video game

- Tim Tebow on the cover of NCAA Football 11.
- Developers: EA Tiburon, EA Canada
- Publisher: EA Sports
- Composer: Colin O'Malley
- Platforms: iOS; PlayStation 2 PlayStation 3 Xbox 360
- Release: July 13, 2010
- Genres: Sports, American football simulation
- Modes: Single-player, multiplayer

NCAA Football 11 is a college football video game created by EA Sports and developed by EA Tiburon. It is the successor to NCAA Football 10 in the NCAA Football series. It was released on July 13, 2010, for the PlayStation 2 (PS2), PlayStation 3, Xbox 360. A handheld version was released for iOS on June 24, 2010. It is the last version of NCAA Football to be made for the PS2.

== New features ==
On February 26, 2010, the first features for the game were announced.

- Dynasty Wire, a web based story generator created for Online Dynasty play.
- New momentum based locomotion engine, creating more realistic movements.
- Team-specific entrances into the game.
- Real Assignment AI and a new blocking system.
- Pro-Tak gang tackling.
- Auto-saves.
- Improved equipment such as helmets, towels, hand warmers, sleeves, and knee braces.
- Dynamic conference logos (for Team Builder play and Custom Conferences).
- Auto loading rosters.
- Single bowl season (for Online Dynasty play).
- New team mascots.
- Improved lighting.
- ESPN style presentation and commentary featuring Brad Nessler, Kirk Herbstreit, and Erin Andrews. Lee Corso will no longer provide commentary for the game.
- Improved recruiting system (for Dynasty Mode play).

The game features an original soundtrack composed by Colin O'Malley. Two songs were eventually reused for the Team Builder audio suite in EA Sports College Football 27.

== Cover ==
On April 8, 2010, former Florida Gators quarterback Tim Tebow was announced as the cover athlete for all four game platforms. The return to a single cover athlete breaks the trend that was seen in the previous two installments of the series where a different cover athlete was chosen for each platform.

== Marketing ==
In July 2010, Time Warner announced that it would offer a copy of NCAA Football 11 and a copy of The Greatest College Bowl Game Moments DVD free with a paid subscription to Sports Illustrated.

A demo was released on June 14, 2010, at the Xbox Live Marketplace (Xbox 360) and PlayStation Store (PlayStation 3). It included four different matchups to play with as well as alternate uniforms for use in the full game. The Red River Rivalry between Oklahoma and Texas in the Cotton Bowl and the Sunshine Showdown of Florida at Florida State are included, along with Miami at Ohio State and Missouri at Clemson.

== See also ==
- Madden NFL 11
