= Troels Brun Folmann =

Danish composer

- Born: 10 January 1974 (age 52); Copenhagen, Denmark
- Genres: Orchestral; electronic; electro-acoustic
- Occupations: Music composer; Music Software
- Instruments: Keyboard; piano
- Years active: 2003–present
- Labels: Eidos Interactive; Square Enix

Troels Brun Folmann (born 10 January 1974) is a Danish composer who specializes in orchestral music, featured in TV shows, trailers, and video games. His work includes the soundtrack for some media of the Tomb Raider series, trailers for films such as Spider-Man 3, X-Men: The Last Stand, The Illusionist and 10,000 BC, and the fourth season of TV series America's Got Talent. He worked on the Tomb Raider series with Crystal Dynamics for Tomb Raider: Legend, Tomb Raider: Anniversary and Tomb Raider: Underworld, and the spin-off Lara Croft and the Guardian of Light.

== Music sampling and production ==
Troels co-owned a music sampling company called Tonehammer, a developer of premium virtual instruments for composers and producers.

As of August 2011, Tonehammer was split into two separate companies with Troels leading a new music-sampling company, along with partner Tawnia Knox, called 8Dio Productions. The virtual instruments of 8Dio range from epic choirs and epic percussion ensembles to solo vocals and next-generation hybrid scoring tools, with over 250 products serving every genre worldwide.

In May 2018, Troels Folmann launched the Sequential Prophet X with Dave Smith (founder of the original Sequential Circuits synthesizer company). The Prophet X is an analog hybrid sample synthesizer with over 150 GB of sample content. The Prophet X earned the prestigious TEC Award, which was the second TEC Award Troels Folmann has received.

In October 2021 Troels Folmann launched Soundpaint, which is an advanced music instrument technology. Soundpaint renders all instruments with infinite dynamic velocities in real time.

== Awards ==
Folmann has won multiple international awards, including the British Academy Award (BAFTA) for Best Original Score, the Mix Foundation TEC Award for the Best Interactive Entertainment Sound Production for his work on Tomb Raider: Legend, which was his composing debut for the Tomb Raider series. In addition, Troels Folmann has been awarded the GDC/G.A.N.G award for his soundtrack work. Troels is also a PhD. scholar in Adaptive Music Systems and Artificial Intelligence.

== Video game scores ==
- Robin Hood: Defender of the Crown (2003)
- Project Snowblind (2005)
- Tomb Raider: Legend (2006)
- Tomb Raider: Anniversary (2007)
- Tomb Raider: Underworld (2008); composer of the "Main Theme" and bulk supervisor to composer Colin O'Malley
- Lara Croft and the Guardian of Light (2010); re-editing tracks from Tomb Raider: Legend, Anniversary, and Underworld, with Colin O'Malley
- Carrier Command: Gaea Mission (2012)
- Need For Speed (2012)
- Transformers: Fall of Cybertron (2012)
- Transformers: Rise of the Dark Spark (2014); with Jeff Broadbent, Steve Jablonsky and Bobby Tahouri
- Commercial music for TESLA Motors (2016)
- Counter Strike: Global Offensive (2015); Music Kit: Uber Blasto Phone
- Commercial music Blizzard / Overwatch (2016)
- Commercial music Blizzard / Overwatch 2 (2020)

== Film trailer scores ==
- The Illusionist (2006)
- X-Men: The Last Stand (2006)
- Spider-Man 3 (2007)
- The Last Mimzy (2007)
- Pirates of the Caribbean: At World's End (2007)
- 10,000 BC (2008)
- Valkyrie (2008)
- Kings (2009)
- Batman Arkham Asylum (2009)
- America's Got Talent (2009)

== Awards ==
- Scandinavian D3 Award for Best Composer of All Time (2006)
- British Academy Video Games Award for Best Original Score (2006)
- GDC/GANG Award for Best Original Soundtrack (2007)
- Mix Foundation / TEC Award for Best Interactive Sound Production (2007)

Preceded by Peter Connelly	Tomb Raider composer 2006–2010	Succeeded by Colin O'Malley
