= Tomb Raider: Legend =

2006 video game

- Developer: Crystal Dynamics (Note: Windows, Xbox and GameCube versions developed by Nixxes Software, PlayStation Portable and PlayStation 3 versions by Buzz Monkey Software, Game Boy Advance and Nintendo DS versions by Human Soft, and mobile version by Fathammer and Sixela Productions)
- Publisher: Eidos Interactive (Note: PlayStation 3 version published by Square Enix Europe)
- Producer: Morgan Gray
- Designers: Riley Cooper; Doug Church
- Programmer: Rob Pavey
- Writers: Eric Lindstrom; Aaron Vanian; Toby Gard
- Composer: Troels Brun Folmann
- Series: Tomb Raider
- Platforms: PlayStation 2; Windows; Xbox; Xbox 360; PlayStation Portable; Game Boy Advance; Nintendo DS; GameCube; PlayStation 3
- Release: 7 April 2006: PS2, Win, Xbox, X360; EU: 7 April 2006; NA: 11 April 2006; AU: 13 April 2006 PlayStation Portable; PAL: 9 June 2006; NA: 21 June 2006 GBA, DS; EU: 10 November 2006; NA: 14 November 2006; AU: 17 November 2006 GameCube; NA: 14 November 2006; EU: 1 December 2006 PlayStation 3; NA: 22 March 2011; EU: 25 March 2011; AU: 31 March 2011
- Genre: Action-adventure
- Mode: Single-player

Tomb Raider: Legend is a 2006 action-adventure video game developed by Crystal Dynamics and published by Eidos Interactive. It is the seventh main entry in the Tomb Raider series, and is described as a "reimagining" of the series and its protagonist Lara Croft. The game was released in 2006 for PlayStation 2, Windows, Xbox, Xbox 360, PlayStation Portable, GameCube, Game Boy Advance, Nintendo DS, and mobile phones. A PlayStation 3 port was released in 2011 as part of The Tomb Raider Trilogy.

Legend details Lara Croft's quest for the mythical sword Excalibur, racing across the world against her former friend Amanda Evert. Gameplay features Lara navigating linear levels, fighting enemies and solving environmental puzzles to progress. The DS and GBA versions share the game's story while sporting gameplay adjusted for the platforms. The mobile version adapts locations from the game into on rails command-based platforming and combat scenarios.

Following the critical failure of Core Design's Tomb Raider: The Angel of Darkness, Eidos transferred development of the next Tomb Raider to American developer Crystal Dynamics, who began production in 2004. The aim was to revitalise the franchise, with both the gameplay and Lara herself being redesigned. Lara's creator Toby Gard was brought on board to help with this and was deeply involved with the project. Composer Troels Brun Folmann designed the music to change during levels as the player progresses.

Legend received generally positive reviews, with many praising the game as a return to form for the series, and either won or was nominated for multiple gaming awards. The GBA and DS ports received lower scores due to the impact of hardware limitations on the gameplay. Selling over six million copies worldwide, Legend helped revitalise the Tomb Raider brand and re-established Lara Croft as a gaming icon. The game was followed by two further games set in the same continuity; Tomb Raider: Anniversary, a remake of the first game in the series that released in 2007, while a direct sequel to Legend, Tomb Raider: Underworld, followed in 2008.

== Gameplay ==
Lara Croft manipulating an object using her grappling line

Tomb Raider: Legend is a single-player action-adventure game in which the player controls Lara Croft, from a third-person perspective, through eight levels set across seven locations around the world. As Lara Croft, the player can jump, climb and shimmy along ledges and vertical poles or ladders, crawl through small spaces, swing on ropes and horizontal poles, interact with objects and switches, use a grappling line to swing across gaps and pull objects towards her, and swim and dive underwater for a limited time. Different button combinations can create more moves such as a roll and swan dive. Some levels have Lara on a motorbike racing through that part of the level while fighting enemies.

Puzzles can block progress in the level until Lara solves them by activating switches within the area. These and other objectives such as avoiding or jamming traps can involve pushing large blocks around the environment. In some sections, the player must pass quick time events by reacting to control prompts that appear on screen. While exploring, Lara can use her grapple to move and destroy certain objects, use a small torch to illuminate dark areas, identify different environmental characteristics using her binoculars, and pick up a maximum of three Health Packs which can heal damage suffered during gameplay. Collectable Artefacts hidden in each level can be found and unlock extra features, while Time Trials challenge players to complete any level within a time limit.

During combat, Lara automatically locks on to enemies, with the player able to switch to another target within range. She can move around freely to avoid enemy attacks and trigger environmental hazards to aid her in combat. Lara can access up to two weapon types; her default twin pistols with infinite ammunition, and a secondary weapon, which is picked up during a level and has limited ammunition which can be replenished from defeated enemies carrying the same weapon type. Lara can also carry grenades to throw at enemies, perform melee attacks when she is close enough, and use her grapple to briefly stun them. When close to a targeted enemy, Lara can perform a jump attack which slows down time while she is airborne, allowing her more time to dispatch her enemies. If Lara's health is depleted she dies and restarts at a previous checkpoint.

The home console, Windows and PlayStation Portable (PSP) versions share content and level design. The PSP version includes exclusive "Tomb Trials". These missions have players either navigating a series of obstacles within a time limit or hunting treasures within one of the game's levels. Tomb Trials can be completed both in single-playing and multiplayer mode, where two players can compete in one on a local network. The Nintendo DS (DS) version uses a hybrid of 3D environments and 2D sprites. Lara moves through levels as in the main versions and players use the DS's touchscreen and mic functions in gameplay. The Game Boy Advance (GBA) version is a 2D side-scroller. The mobile version uses three of the locations and splits its gameplay into two types per location. In platforming sections players must guide Lara through environmental hazards. In combat sections Lara must dodge enemy fire and kill all enemies to move forward. The gameplay in each stage plays out on rails with limited movement and input from the player.

== Synopsis ==
=== Characters ===
Tomb Raider: Legend retells the story of British archaeologist/adventurer Lara Croft. As a young girl, she and her mother, Amelia, are the only survivors of a plane crash in the Himalayas. Publicly, Lara was the only survivor of the crash, as her mother was apparently killed upon interacting with a magical artifact in a Nepalese temple where they took shelter. After her ordeal, Lara goes on archaeological expeditions with her father Richard before his disappearance and presumed death in Cambodia when she is sixteen. In the years since, she has become both famous and infamous for her work as an archaeologist and explorer, privately driven by the need to understand her mother's fate.

American tech expert Zip and English research assistant Alister Fletcher support her on missions from her manor house in England, where they live with her butler Winston Smith. During the events of Legend, Lara interacts with multiple supporting characters. These include Anaya Imanu, an old friend who has often helped Lara during her exploits, media tycoon and investigative journalist/reporter Toru Nishimura, who also experienced risks similar to Lara's, and Shogo Takamoto, businessman-turned-yakuza boss whom Lara once confronted over forged antiquities. The main antagonists are Amanda Evert, an old friend of Lara's presumed dead after a catastrophic incident in Peru, and her associate, American playboy James Rutland.

=== Plot ===
Lara Croft heads into Bolivia on a tip from Anaya to find a stone dais in the ruined city of Tiwanaku. Lara believes the stone is connected to her mother's disappearance following the plane crash. A flashback shows young Lara activating a similar dais in a Nepalese monastery, creating a magical portal; Amelia vanishes upon drawing an ornate sword from the dais after hearing voices from the portal. Fighting through mercenaries exploring Tiwanaku, Lara confronts their employer, James Rutland, who has a fragment of an identical sword. He also mentions Amanda Evert, a friend Lara presumed dead. During a tomb dig in Peru, a guardian "Entity" killed everyone but Lara and Amanda before vanishing when Amanda retrieved a glowing stone trying to open a door. The tomb flooded, and Lara was forced to abandon Amanda after she was seemingly crushed by falling debris.

Lara meets with Anaya in Peru to discover the truth. Draining the tomb, Lara finds proof of Amanda's survival, a statue of Tiwanaku's last queen—whose life strongly parallels the common legends of King Arthur—and a replica of her sword; the tip resembles an artifact stolen by Takamoto. In Tokyo, Lara's negotiations with Takamoto break down, and she storms his offices before killing him in a final duel. The stolen sword fragment, which has destructive magical abilities, was discovered by an 11th-century crusader said to have been a knight of Arthur. Lara then pursues Rutland to a hidden Ghanaian temple that Richard Croft explored during his career. Rutland is searching for the Ghalali Key, a talisman which can reforge the sword. During her explorations, Lara finds a pendant belonging to Amelia. Confronting Rutland, who assumed Richard found the Ghalali Key, Lara takes his sword fragment, learning that Amanda has ransacked her home in search of it.

Lara pursues Amanda to Kazakhstan, where she discovers a 1950s-era Soviet research base that unsuccessfully tried to weaponise the sword's energies. Amanda, now bitter about the events in Peru, races her to the artifact, eventually unleashing the tamed Entity on Lara using its control stone. Lara avoids the Entity and retrieves the sword fragment as the facility disintegrates. Lara also discovers the shield of the knight who had the fragment, bearing an ancient map. The decoded map leads Lara to a Cornwall-based Arthurian tourist attraction built over a hidden complex housing the tombs of Arthur and his knights around a broken dais. She realises that the sword she is pursuing is the legendary Excalibur—one of many swords forged by an unnamed civilisation that have created a monomyth within multiple later cultures—left in pieces and scattered across the world by Arthur's knights. Retrieving the fragment left with Arthur, she escapes the tomb and its guardian sea serpent.

The group realise that the Ghalali Key was found in Ghana by Richard and given to Amelia to replace the pendant she lost; it now lies with the crashed plane in Nepal. During a talk with Winston, Lara reveals her determination to salvage her father's ruined reputation by using Excalibur to prove his theories about the daises. Returning to Nepal, Lara recovers the Ghalali Key, then travels to the monastery holding the original dais and reforges Excalibur. The broken dais splinters when she tries to use it, forcing her to return to the intact dais in Bolivia. On arriving she is forced to kill Rutland during a fight with his mercenaries and destroys the Entity when Amanda summons and merges with it. Placing the sword in the dais, Lara activates a portal and sees a vision of Amelia. Realising that the portal is a time rift, Lara tries to warn Amelia, but Amanda panics and shouts to remove the sword before the dais explodes, triggering the events of Amelia's apparent death. An enraged Lara almost shoots Amanda, but Amanda says that Amelia was transported to Avalon. Lara knocks Amanda unconscious and sets out to find Amelia.

== Development ==
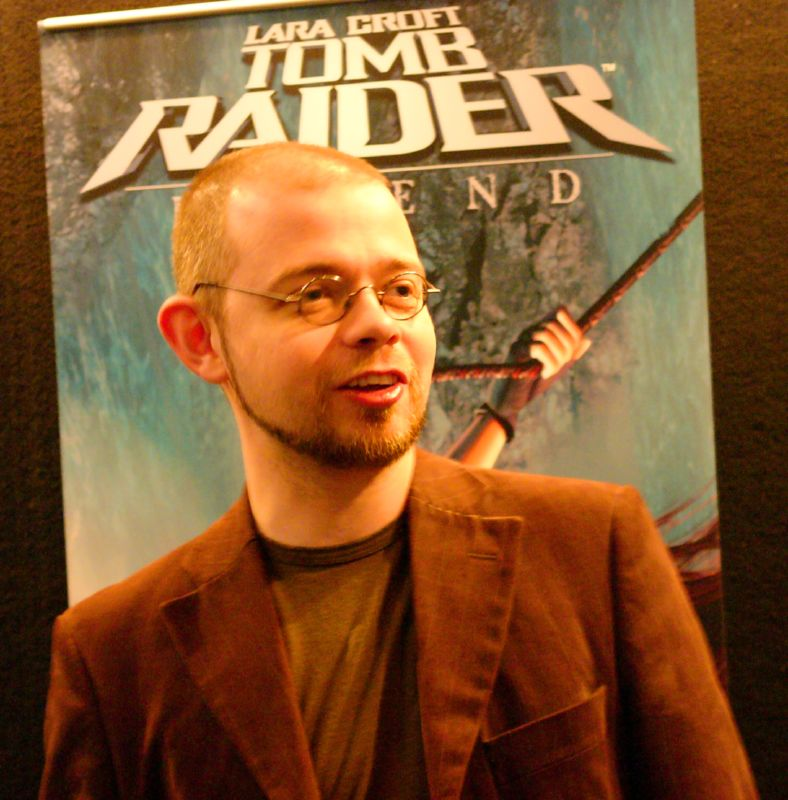
Toby Gard, a key figure for the series and credited creator of Lara Croft, at the 2005 Electronic Entertainment Expo

British-based studio Core Design developed the Tomb Raider series until 2003. Following the successful release of the original game in 1996, they produced four successive sequels between 1997 and 2000. Their sixth and last Tomb Raider game, Tomb Raider: The Angel of Darkness, beset by developmental problems, was rushed to an early release to tie in with the 2003 film Lara Croft: Tomb Raider – The Cradle of Life, a sequel to the successful 2001 film. The game was a critical failure due to its technical problems and blamed for the commercial failure of The Cradle of Life by Paramount Pictures. The failure of The Angel of Darkness—in addition to general fatigue with the series among Core Design staff—prompted the cancellation of planned sequels, and Eidos Interactive moved development responsibilities to another studio.

Crystal Dynamics took over responsibility for developing future Tomb Raider games. They had gained fame for their work on the Gex and Legacy of Kain series. The team responsible for Legend was the same team responsible for Legacy of Kain: Defiance. According to producer Morgan Gray, the team were wowed initially at being tasked with producing the Tomb Raider series before fully understanding the challenges involved. A notable addition to the team was Toby Gard, one of the key creative figures of the Tomb Raider franchise as both lead designer of the first Tomb Raider and Lara's creator. Gard joined the Crystal Dynamics team during the pre-production phase; he has been referred to as a senior designer, creative consultant, and lead character designer. Gard also helped the team flesh out Lara's early animations, co-wrote the overall story, and worked on creating the characters of both Lara and the rest of the cast. Production of the game began in 2004, lasting approximately two years.

=== Game design ===
Looking at how they needed to revive the series after the negativity surrounding The Angel of Darkness, the team decided that Lara's movement and control scheme needed to be completely redesigned for a modern gaming audience. Lara had to return to exploring ancient ruins and tombs following the controversial focus on urban locations in The Angel of Darkness. Small teams brainstormed and worked on each location. Bolivia was chosen for the opening level, so Lara could scale cliffs. Originally no urban levels were to be featured, but after discussion the team decided to include an urban environment to provide gameplay variety, leading to the creation of the Tokyo level. When creating each locale, the team used images of local scenery and architecture so their level designs remained authentic. A significant level cut from the game was a third South American location which would have held a piece of Excalibur. The team decided three locations would place too much focus on South America, so they created the Kazakhstan level to replace it. The motorcycle segments were described as being similar to minigames, changing the pace for players. A bike segment intended to end the England level was also cut due to scheduling concerns.

The control scheme for the previous titles—which involved moving Lara through levels built using a grid system—was completely scrapped. The new control system, dubbed "fluid movement", would enable players to learn how to control Lara and safely navigate levels with a minimum of difficulty. Combat was designed around Lara's acrobatic prowess and primary goal as an adventurer. It was balanced so it would be non-intrusive and enjoyable for both newcomers and series' veterans. Finalising Lara's animations, which were all hand-animated, took a long time and accounted for an estimated 15-20% of the game's code. Several moves and items had to be cut at various stages of development. Realistic physics, something still novel in gaming at the time, was integrated into gameplay. Rather than using available off-the-shelf physics engines, the team created a custom physics system which handled everything from puzzle design to character and environmental movement. The control scheme and overall atmosphere drew inspiration from Ico. Another influence on the team was the original Tomb Raider and its 1997 sequel. Online elements were considered, but dropped so the team could focus on delivering a polished single-player experience.

Legend uses a game engine based on an updated version of technology used in Legacy of Kain: Soul Reaver. Creating more open environments was a challenge for the development team. Their environment designs for the Legacy of Kain series were more enclosed and required different engine and level architecture. A key part of the engine design was a streaming system; levels were divided into individual units which were loaded in and out depending on Lara's position in the level. This allowed the team to create levels with a high amount of detail without exceeding the memory limitations of their planned consoles. The team later said that developing the engine in parallel with the game's content caused issues both with deciding on what should be kept from each version and making adjustments. The artificial intelligence (AI) was redesigned to react to Lara's actions, with human enemies being able to detect and flank her.

=== Story and character design ===
For the story of Legend, the team reworked Lara's character and backstory. Later in a 2016 interview, the team stated their opinion that Legend was not a reboot, but instead a "reimagining" that "modified but drew on pre-existing canon". They incorporated elements of her original background and earlier adventures into her new backstory and overworld setting as a homage to Core Design's work and the general fan base. Select elements from the first two Tomb Raider films were also included. The subtitle "Legend" was intended to represent the return to Lara's origins which the game as a whole represented. The story had a three-person team working on it during the entire development period. Rather than a "traditional" use of CGI and real-time cutscenes, a combination of in-engine cinematics and dialogue during gameplay told the story.

The team wanted to include a character from the original continuity, but almost all the major characters Lara had encountered were dead. They decided to use a reimagined version of Zip, who had previously cameoed in Tomb Raider: Chronicles. The use of Zip and Alister allowed the team to create a new dynamic for storytelling through dialogue exchanges during gameplay. Rutland was initially a "much more stereotypical 'macho' bad guy", but was eventually redesigned into the more intellectual version used in the final game. The rebooted story contextualised Lara's treasure hunting to understand and perhaps reverse her mother's fate. While the central mystery surrounding Excalibur was completed by the game's end, the central thread of Amelia's fate was left unresolved. The team intended it as the main narrative thread binding future instalments. The central theme of the game drew from the hero's journey theories of Joseph Campbell. The team worked in Arthurian myth and the use of Excalibur as part of the story surrounding Lara's quest.

An important part of the redesign was Lara herself, a process with which Gard was intimately involved. The team initially used Lara's model from The Angel of Darkness as a base and made adjustments such as slimming her down and removing harsh lines from her face. When Gard joined the team, he said he wanted to completely redesign Lara, something the team were happy with because of his role in her creation. Among the changes he implemented were an entirely new outfit and changing Lara's braided hair for a ponytail design. When redesigning her figure, Gard wanted to keep Lara's caricatured female figure while focusing on realistic bone and muscle structure. Despite the redesigns, Gard did not feel that Lara's persona had changed much from his initial vision, but was represented more clearly to players.

Lara's voice actress was recast. Keeley Hawes, a British movie and television actress known for her work on Spooks, replaced Jonell Elliott who had voiced the character from Tomb Raider: The Last Revelation to The Angel of Darkness. Hawes was the fourth actress to voice the character. Shelley Blond, the voice of Lara from the original game, was also approached for the role. Blond confirmed her interest in reprising the role, but eventually Crystal Dynamics settled on Hawes because of her celebrity status. Eidos staff described her as perfect for the role having the "right balance of aristocracy and attitude to really bring to life [Lara] Croft in all her glory". Hawes was given the role after reading a couple of lines given to her by her voice agent who sent a tape to Crystal Dynamics. British model Karima Adebibe was employed to portray Lara at publicity events.

=== Music ===
In-house composer Troels Brun Folmann handled the game's music. Folmann had worked previously with Crystal Dynamics on the score of Project Snowblind after joining the company to complete research for a PhD thesis. Following their positive experience on Project Snowblind, Crystal Dynamics asked Folmann to score the project and invited him to create new systems for scoring. Folmann's aim was to create an ambitious score which would emulate the musical style of Hollywood movies. Many composers, from classical figures to those from modern films, influenced Folmann's work. Legend was the longest score he had worked on at the time. It took him nine months to complete it. The amount of music created has been estimated at between five and seven hours. Four to five hours was used in-game and the rest was dropped.

Folmann created a score for the game based around a fusion of electronic and orchestral elements informed by each area of the game, rather than the more "obvious" course of using a purely orchestral style. While other games at the time, and in previous years, had used relatively few static music tracks for a level which looped continuously, Folmann sought to create a varied score which would adapt to player actions. There were musical variations for each section of a level with a quiet and a combat version which would shift smoothly depending on the situation. While this type of music was not new, the limited RAM audio capacity of gaming consoles made it very difficult to implement effectively. To create the score within these limitations, Folmann created a system he dubbed "micro-scoring". The main theme of the level played in the background with other layers of music played over it, which changed depending on conditions within the level and the player's actions.

Folmann composed the entire score using nine computers, with one computer being dedicated to each part of the overall score. This allowed him to create a large-scape symphonic score within hardware limitations. He tried to imagine how players would feel in each environment while he created the score. For example, he used calming music for the Croft Manor level, and the epic orchestra sound for Lara's escape from the Sea Serpent guarding King Arthur's tomb. Each level had its own lead instrument, taken from the region where the level was set, forming a part of its overall score. Folmann extensively researched characteristic musical styles from each region. He also gave individual characters their own musical motifs. Ethnic instruments played a major role in the overall score. Folmann bought a variety of instruments including duduk, shakuhachi, African drums and Bolivian pan flutes. The series' main theme, a four-note motif composed for the original game by Nathan McCree, was incorporated into the main theme of Legend using a duduk. Folmann also incorporated it in the mission summary music.

== Release and versions ==
Legend was announced in April 2005. An important part of marketing Lara for Eidos was that she be treated respectfully. The series had become negatively associated with promotional partnerships and publicity gimmicks during its initial run. Crystal Dynamics' positive association and communication with Eidos' marketing department was also a key part of development. This allowed the team to focus entirely on completing the game while Eidos helped promote the game to the press and at trade shows.

The game was initially announced for PlayStation 2 (PS2), Xbox and Windows personal computers (PC). Legend marked the Tomb Raider series' debut on Microsoft game consoles with versions for both the Xbox and its successor the Xbox 360 (360). The 360 version acted as the Tomb Raider series' debut on seventh generation consoles. The 360 version incorporated new visual effects and lighting mechanics. While the base engine was carried over from the other versions, the lighting system needed to be entirely rewritten. The 360 version was given equal development priority with the PS2 version. After the success of Lego Star Wars: The Video Game on the GameCube, Eidos decided to port Tomb Raider: Legend to that platform, marking the series' first appearance on a Nintendo home console. The GameCube version was a port of the PS2 and Xbox versions. Despite the Nintendo versions being released close to the Wii's launch, Crystal Dynamics could not consider developing a Wii version of Legend because they did not obtain software development kits for that system until they shifted efforts towards developing Anniversary.

Crystal Dynamics developed the original PS2 and 360 versions, with team members both from the PS2 version and new staff. Nixxes Software created the Xbox, PC and GameCube ports. The PC version included a "Next Gen Graphics" option which upgraded the game's graphics to appear similar to the 360 version. Buzz Monkey Software ported the PSP version, creating their port based on the PS2 with a few platform-exclusive features. Human Soft developed versions for the GBA and DS. Legend was the first Tomb Raider released for the DS. The DS version used a combination of 2D sprites and 3D graphics while incorporating the original cutscenes. The GBA version was fully 2D using parallax scrolling to simulate distance and telling the story using slideshows of still images. While the PSP version used the PS2 source code and launched close to the home console versions, the other portable versions needed to be built from scratch. Creating the combined 2D/3D engine for the DS version was challenging for Human Soft. A version for mobile phones was also created. Developed by Fathammer and Sixela Productions, the game broke away from earlier Tomb Raider mobile titles by using full 3D graphics and emulating the gameplay of its console counterparts. With a large team of 20 people working on the port, the game was developed in close collaboration with Crystal Dynamics so it would scale to a variety of mobiles which could support 3D graphics.

Demo versions of the PC and 360 versions—covering the game's opening level—were made available on 3 and 4 April respectively. Following the game's release, the PC demo was updated to include the Next Gen Graphics options. Legend was released in Europe on 7 April 2006 for PC, PS2, Xbox and Xbox 360. These versions were released in North America on 11 April, and in Australia on April 13. The PC version received a patch a few days after its European release to address stability and technical issues. The PSP version was released on 9 June in Europe and Australia, and 21 June in North America. Spike published the PS2, 360 and PSP versions in Japan on 7 December. The DS and GBA versions were released on 10 November in Europe, 14 November 2006 in North America, and 17 November in Australia. The GameCube version was released first in North America on 14 November, and in Europe on 1 December. The mobile version was released in December 2006, initially exclusive to Europe's Orange network until the following year.

== Reception ==
Reception

Aggregate score
Aggregator	Score
Metacritic	82/100 (PS2/Xbox/PC); 80/100 (360); 67/100 (PSP); 78/100 (NGC); 58/100 (DS)

Review scores
Publication	Score
1Up.com	B+ (PS2/Xbox/360); B- (PSP)
Edge	8/10 (PC/PS2/Xbox/360)
Eurogamer	7/10 (360/PSP)
GamePro	4/5 (PS2/Xbox/360); 3.25/5 (PSP)
GameSpot	7.8/10 (PC/PS2/Xbox/360/NGC); 6.2/10 (PSP); 7.6/10 (DS); 7/10 (GBA)
GameSpy	4.5/5 (Xbox); 4/5 (PS2/360); 3.5/5 (PC/PSP)
IGN	8.2/10 (PC/Xbox/360); 8/10 (PS2/NGC); 7.2/10 (PSP); 6.1/10 (DS); 5.5/10 (GBA)

Tomb Raider: Legend met with positive reviews. Multiple websites called Legend a return to form for the Tomb Raider series following a string of below-average sequels after the original game. Comments focused on its modern redesign. Edge praised the game's art direction and distinct environments, saying it delivers "more drama than ... many games twice Legend's size". The magazine also highlighted Lara's reliable controls and acrobatic movements, comparing them favourably to Prince of Persia: The Sands of Time (2003), but criticized the superficial combat system. Overall, the magazine concluded that Legend "established a rock solid foundation for inevitable, now justified successors".

Reviewers praised the story for its strength, as well as its graphics and environmental design. The platforming and puzzle elements were also commended, although the combat was seen as fairly weak due to simplified mechanics and predictable AI. A common point of praise was its improved controls compared to previous entries, which made navigating the game's environments much easier and more enjoyable. The music and sound design received overall approval for its quality and variety. Some reviewers pointed out its short length, lack of variety in puzzle design, and occasional technical issues such as frame rate drops.

The 360 version was praised for its improved graphics over other console versions even though there were no other major content differences. A complaint specific to the PC version was a low framerate caused by the "Next Gen Content" graphics option. The PSP port was acclaimed for its added content compared to the versions released up to that point, but several reviewers faulted its controls and poorer graphics. The DS version was seen as a decent version of the game, despite weak combat and problems caused by the hardware limitations, while the GBA version was faulted for its oversimplified design and poor performance. IGN's Levi Buchanan and Stuart Dredge of Pocket Gamer praised the mobile version for its quality. Both reviewers, however, noted repetition in gameplay and felt it would be best enjoyed by fans of the series.

=== Sales ===
When Legend first released in the United Kingdom, it was the top-selling game during its first week of release, replacing the previous week's bestselling title The Godfather. It remained in first place for two weeks and moved into second place following the release of 2006 FIFA World Cup. Legend remained in the top ten bestselling titles in the UK into July 2006. The PS2 version received a "Platinum" sales award from the Entertainment and Leisure Software Publishers Association (ELSPA), indicating sales of at least 300,000 copies in the United Kingdom. The game was the eighth best-selling game in the UK in 2006.

According to the NPD Group, Legend was the third bestselling game in North America during April. In Australia, the PS2 and 360 versions were both among the top ten best-selling titles during the weeks following their release. Within a month of its release, all versions of the game had sold 2.9 million copies combined by the end of June 2006. According to different estimates, in 2009, the game had sold between 3 and 4.5 million copies worldwide. This made it the second bestselling Tomb Raider game after the 1999 release of The Last Revelation and the fifth bestselling game in the series at that point.

To mark the 25th anniversary of Tomb Raider, Square Enix and Crystal Dynamics celebrated the franchise with community features, nostalgic and unseen contents throughout 2021. On its dedicated month, it was revealed that Legend had sold 6.4 million by June 2021.

=== Accolades ===
At the 2006 Spike Video Game Awards, Lara Croft was nominated in the Cyber Vixen of the Year category. Keeley Hawes was nominated in the Best Performance by a Human (Female) category. The National Academy of Video Game Trade Reviewers nominated the game in the Control Precision category in 2006. At the Golden Joystick Awards that year, the game received nominations in the Girls Choice, PC Game of the Year, PlayStation Game of the Year, Xbox Game of the Year and Ultimate Game of 2006 categories. Lara Croft herself was nominated for and won the Favourite Character award. The game's mobile version won an award at the 2007 Spike Video Game Awards in the Best Mobile Action Game category, as well as being nominated for Mobile Game of the Year. At the 2006 British Academy of Film and Television Arts, Legend won the award for Best Original Score. The soundtrack also won the Music of the Year award at the 2007 Game Audio Network Guild Awards. The game was also the winner in the Interactive Entertainment Sound Production category at the 2007 TEC Awards.

== Legacy ==
In later articles discussing the Tomb Raider series, Legend is generally cited as having restored fans' faith in its brand and its lead character. Following the success of Legend, Crystal Dynamics remade the original game under the title Tomb Raider: Anniversary, which was released in 2007. A sequel to Legend, Tomb Raider: Underworld began development following the release of Legend and was published in 2008. Legend was remastered by Buzz Monkey Software and re-released as part of a PlayStation 3 collection, The Tomb Raider Trilogy, alongside Anniversary and Underworld in March 2011 worldwide. Hawes voiced Lara in Anniversary, Underworld, and titles in the Lara Croft spin-off series, which take place in their own continuity and began with Guardian of Light in 2010.
