= Rinth Island =

2012 video game

- Screenshot
- Developer(s): Buzz Monkey Software
- Publisher(s): Chillingo
- Designer(s): Stan Patton; Lucas Wells
- Composer(s): Duncan McPherson
- Platform(s): iOS
- Release: March 29, 2012
- Genre(s): Puzzle-platform, adventure

Rinth Island is a third person adventure puzzle game that combines 2D and 3D perspectives. The game is played through either the male character (Gimble) or the female character (Libby) as they help rebuild the town on Rinth Island after a powerful storm. The game received positive reviews, but was not a commercial success, with only 1,990 downloads from the iOS App Store. It was removed by 2015.

== Gameplay ==
The player controls either as the male character Gimble, or the female character Libby. The character is controlled by a virtual direction pad that can go either left or right, or by touching the screen towards where the character would move. The characters cannot jump, so players must make use of ladders and flying bugs to elevate. The player pushes coconuts and crates, pulls levers, and fires cannons and explosives in order to clear off obstacles such as opening/closing platforms, baskets, and rocks. There are four modes in the game: Basic (beat the level), steps (beat the level under a certain number of steps), timed (beat the level quickly), and crystal (collectible crystals appear in the level, often requiring the player to access parts of the level they did not consider before).

== Reception ==
Reception

Aggregate score
Aggregator	Score
Metacritic	85/100
