= Nixxes Software =

Dutch video game developer

Nixxes Software B.V.
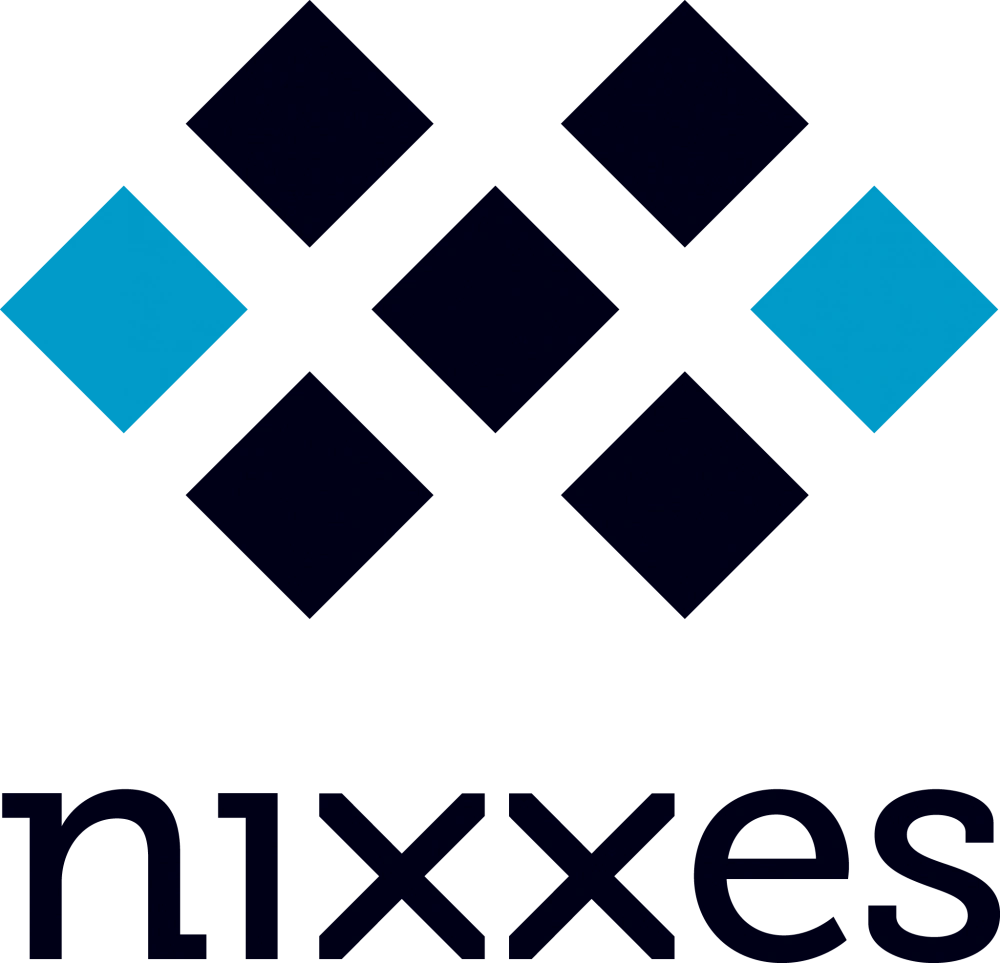
- Logo used since 2011
- Type: Subsidiary
- Industry: Video games
- Founded: 1999; 27 years ago
- Founder: Jurjen Katsman
- Headquarters: Utrecht, Netherlands
- Key people: Jurjen Katsman (senior director)
- Number of employees: 85 (2025)
- Parent: PlayStation Studios (2021–present)
- Website: nixxes.com

Nixxes Software B.V. is a Dutch video game developer based in Utrecht. It was founded by former demoscene developer Jurjen Katsman in 1999 to port the game Legacy of Kain: Soul Reaver to the Dreamcast. In July 2021, the company was acquired by Sony Interactive Entertainment as part of PlayStation Studios to help bring its games from PlayStation platforms to personal computers. As of 2020, 40% of Nixxes' work comprises game ports, with the remainder being co-development efforts like the production of art assets.

== History ==
During the mid-1990s, Jurjen Katsman was a computer science student, gamer, and demoscene developer in the Netherlands. During one weekend, he was invited to meet Dutch developers working for the British publisher Eidos Interactive. Without his knowledge, these developers had arranged a job interview for him. He was hired by Eidos and asked to relocate to London within three weeks, forcing him to cease his studies. Katsman remained in London for two years before being transferred to Crystal Dynamics in the United States, which Eidos had acquired in 1998. After some time of living in hotels, Katsman chose to return to the Netherlands. By this time, Crystal Dynamics was developing Legacy of Kain: Soul Reaver and sought a developer capable of porting it to the Dreamcast. Believing that Katsman had the right skill set, the company hired him for the conversion. At their behest, Katsman founded Nixxes Software in 1999, deriving the name from "nix", his demoscene nickname. The Dreamcast port of Legacy of Kain: Soul Reaver was Nixxes' first project, which Katsman completed on his own.

By 2013, when Nixxes was working on Thief, the company employed seventeen people. In 2018, it moved into Utrecht's World Trade Center.

The company faced some hardships during the onset of the COVID-19 pandemic because a lot of hardware had to remain in the office while most employees transitioned to remote work, and many workflows required a high-speed connection to the company servers. On 1 July 2021, Sony Interactive Entertainment announced its acquisition of Nixxes Software to undisclosed terms. In a statement to Famitsu later that month, Sony Interactive Entertainment's CEO, Jim Ryan, stated that the acquisition aimed at bringing first-party PlayStation games to personal computers. After initially assisting Guerrilla Games in patching the Windows version of Horizon Zero Dawn Complete Edition throughout 2020 and 2021, their first standalone project as a PlayStation Studios subsidiary was revealed in June 2022 to be the PC ports of Marvel's Spider-Man Remastered and Marvel's Spider-Man: Miles Morales, developed in collaboration with sister studio Insomniac Games.

In 2023, Nixxes confirmed that it would start working on more remasters while also continuing their work on PC ports.

== Games ==
Year	Title	Platform(s)	Original developer	Notes	Ref.
2000	Legacy of Kain: Soul Reaver	Dreamcast	Crystal Dynamics	Port development	
2001	Mad Dash Racing	Xbox	Crystal Dynamics	Renderer development	
2001	Soul Reaver 2	Windows	Crystal Dynamics	Port development	
2002	Blood Omen 2	GameCube, Windows, Xbox	Crystal Dynamics	Port development	
2003	Legacy of Kain: Defiance	Windows, Xbox	Crystal Dynamics	Port and tools development	
2003	Whiplash	PlayStation 2, Xbox	Crystal Dynamics	Renderer development	
2005	Project Snowblind	Windows, Xbox	Crystal Dynamics	Port development	
2006	Tomb Raider: Legend	GameCube, Windows, Xbox	Crystal Dynamics	Port and tools development	
2007	Tomb Raider: Anniversary	Windows	Crystal Dynamics	Port development	
2008	Tomb Raider: Underworld	Windows, PlayStation 3	Crystal Dynamics	Port development	
2010	Kane & Lynch 2: Dog Days	Windows	IO Interactive	Port development	
2010	Lara Croft and the Guardian of Light	Windows, PlayStation 3	Crystal Dynamics	Port development	
2011	Deus Ex: Human Revolution	Windows	Eidos-Montréal	Port development	
2012	Hitman: Absolution	Windows	IO Interactive	Port development	
2013	Tomb Raider	Windows, PlayStation 3, PlayStation 4	Crystal Dynamics	Port development	
2013	Killzone Shadow Fall	PlayStation 4	Guerrilla Games	Additional work	
2014	Thief	Windows	Eidos-Montréal	Port development	
2014	Lara Croft and the Temple of Osiris	Windows, PlayStation 4	Crystal Dynamics	Port development	
2015	Rise of the Tomb Raider	Windows, Xbox 360, PlayStation 4	Crystal Dynamics	Port development	
2016	Deus Ex: Mankind Divided	Windows	Eidos-Montréal	Port development	
2018	Shadow of the Tomb Raider	Windows	Eidos-Montréal	Port development	
2020	Marvel's Avengers	Windows	Crystal Dynamics	Port development	
2021	Horizon Zero Dawn Complete Edition	Windows	Guerrilla Games	Post-release work	
2022	Marvel's Spider-Man Remastered	Windows	Insomniac Games	Port development	
2022	Marvel's Spider-Man: Miles Morales	Windows	Insomniac Games	Port development	
2023	Ratchet & Clank: Rift Apart	Windows	Insomniac Games	Port development	
2024	Horizon Forbidden West Complete Edition	Windows	Guerrilla Games	Port development	
2024	Ghost of Tsushima Director's Cut	Windows	Sucker Punch Productions	Port development	
2024	Horizon Zero Dawn Remastered	PlayStation 5, Windows	Guerrilla Games	Port development	
2025	Marvel's Spider-Man 2	Windows	Insomniac Games	Port development	
2025	The Last of Us Part II Remastered	Windows	Naughty Dog	Port development	
2025	Helldivers 2	Xbox Series X/S	Arrowhead Game Studios	Port development	
2025	The Last of Us Part I	Windows	Naughty Dog	Post-release work	
2025	Helldivers 2	Windows	Arrowhead Game Studios	Post-release work	
2026	Death Stranding 2: On the Beach	Windows	Kojima Productions	Port development	
2026	Saros	PlayStation 5	Housemarque	Additional work	
