= Galleon (video game) =

2004 video game

- Developer: Confounding Factor
- Publishers: EU: SCi Games; NA: Atlus USA
- Designer: Toby Gard
- Platform: Xbox
- Release: EU: June 11, 2004; NA: August 3, 2004
- Genres: Action-adventure; Platformer
- Mode: Single-player

Galleon is a 2004 action-adventure game developed by Confounding Factor and published by SCi Games and Atlus USA for the Xbox. Designed by Toby Gard as his first independent project after leaving Core Design, the game was announced in 1998, but suffered several delays and changes in the consoles it would be released to. It was released in Europe on June 11, 2004, and in North America on August 3 to mixed reviews from critics. A mobile spin-off entitled Galleon: Dawn was released on August 26, 2004.

== Plot ==
Captain Rhama Sabrier is hired by the scholar Dr. Areliano to help him study a mysterious boat in his possession. There is a massive tree inside of the boat from which grows mystical herbs (Rhama names the boat the Treeship in respect to this fact), which Areliano wishes to study for their scientific merit. Areliano's assistant Jabez kills the scholar and steals the Treeship out of greed, and Rhama pursues him both to stop his plans and to learn the Treeship's origins. Although he catches up to Jabez several times, Rhama is repeatedly thwarted by the godlike powers Jabez harnesses by consuming the Treeship's herbs.

Rhama and his crew travel to many islands on their journey, and several people join them: Faith, a healer and Dr. Areliano's daughter; Calverly, a shipwright and Rhama's friend who is transformed into a monkey by Jabez; and the martial artist Mihoko, who is rescued from an island of slaves and swears her life to Rhama.

Eventually, Rhama and his crew discover that an ancient civilization had cultivated the herbs as a source of energy and eternal life, and that they were using the Treeship to transport the only tree that can be cross-pollinated with the dying sacred tree, located on the island of Epheremy. The heroes sail to Epheremy and confront Jabez, who threatened its inhabitants into taking him to the site of the sacred tree. Jabez consumes the sacred tree's just-bloomed flower to gain immense power, but is nevertheless defeated and killed by Rhama. Jabez's corpse produces seeds that can grow more of the Treeship's trees, meaning that Epheremy's inhabitants now have immediate access its herbs and the sacred tree is saved. Later, Rhama and his crew bury the treasure that they had accumulated, and Rhama and Faith are implied to have become lovers.

== Development ==
Announced in Edge in 1998, the game went through various incarnations and publishers. The designer of Lara Croft, Toby Gard left Core Design shortly after the character's first game, Tomb Raider, was released. Galleon was to be his first independent title following Tomb Raider. Galleon started development on PC and moved to Dreamcast, then GameCube (as Galleon: Islands of Mystery) and eventually to the Xbox. The title was originally going to be published by Interplay but after numerous delays was cancelled and subsequently picked up by SCi. Gard's company Confounding Factor closed its doors after the release and he returned to Eidos Interactive as a design consultant for the Tomb Raider franchise. The graphical style of the game was intended to have a comic book feel as well as being influenced by Ray Harryhausen's Sinbad films and Burt Lancaster vehicles. The soundtrack was originally composed by Lee Nicklen, and has since been made available for free.

== Reception ==
Reception

Aggregate scores
Aggregator	Score	
Aggregator	mobile	Xbox
GameRankings	72%	67%
Metacritic	N/A	67/100

Review scores
Publication	Score	
Publication	mobile	Xbox
1Up.com	N/A	C+
Edge	N/A	7/10
Electronic Gaming Monthly	N/A	4.5/10
Eurogamer	N/A	6/10
Game Informer	N/A	4.25/10
GameSpot	7.2/10	7/10
GameSpy	N/A	3.5/5
GameZone	N/A	7.5/10
IGN	N/A	8.2/10
Official Xbox Magazine (US)	N/A	6.8/10
The Times	N/A	4/5

Galleon: Islands of Mystery received "average" reviews according to video game review aggregator website Metacritic.
