= Colin O'Malley =

American composer

- Born: December 9, 1973 (age 52)
- Genres: Orchestral, electronic, electro-acoustic
- Occupation: Composer
- Instruments: Keyboard, piano
- Years active: 1999–present

Colin O'Malley (born December 9, 1973) is an American music composer. He is a two-time Emmy nominee for Outstanding Music Composition from the National Academy of Television Arts and Sciences (The Last Reunion/PBS, Woman in Motion/Paramount+).

Colin has worked as an orchestrator and arranger for the recording artist Yanni, most notably on Inspirato, which featured performances by Plácido Domingo, Renée Fleming, Russell Watson, Katherine Jenkins, and other world-renowned vocalists. The album debuted at #1 on the Billboard Classical chart.

Colin has also collaborated with renowned tenor Nathan Pacheco, whom he first met while working on Yanni Voices. Colin’s soaring ballad “Prendi I Miei Sogni” was performed by Pacheco with the Mormon Tabernacle Choir. Pacheco subsequently performed the song in Carnegie Hall.

Beyond his composition work, Colin is a longtime innovator in orchestral sampling and music technology. He has worked extensively with 8Dio.com, producing flagship virtual instruments including the Century Orchestra Project, Adagio/Agitato Strings, Claire Woodwinds, AGE, Studio Sopranos, CAGE, 8W, and more. These tools are used by composers worldwide and have been featured in projects such as Interstellar, Game of Thrones, The Flash, Arrow, and many others.

== List of works ==
=== Composer ===
- Pre Fab! (2025) (Documentary)
- Woman In Motion (2019) (Documentary)
- Battle for Eire (2018)
- Madden NFL 13 (2012) (VG)
- NCAA Football 12 (2011) (VG)
- NCAA Football 11 (2010) (VG)
- Lara Croft and the Guardian of Light (2010) (re-editing tracks from Tomb Raider: Legend, Anniversary, and Underworld, with Troels Brun Folmann)
- Letters to God (2010)
- Tomb Raider: Underworld (2008) (composer of the bulk with Troels B. Folmann as supervisor)
- Mr. Gnobody (2008)
- Dusk (2007)
- Mr. Bubbs (2007)
- Superman Returns (2006) (VG)
- Once Not Far from Home (2006)
- The Last Reunion: A Gathering of Heroes (2003) (Documentary)
- Hereditary Misfortune (2003)
- Time & Again (2002)
- Funky Town (2000)
- All Shook Up (1999)
- The Salesman (1999/I)
- Uncommon Friends of the Twentieth Century (1999) (Documentary)

=== Musical support ===
- Boyz II Men: Under the Streetlight (2017) (Album) (producer)
- The Dream Concert: Live from the Great Pyramids of Egypt (2016) (TV) (orchestrator)
- Yanni: Inspirato (2014) (Album) (orchestrator)
- Yanni: Live at El Morro (2012) (TV) (orchestrator)
- Disney Parks Christmas Parade Special (2009-2010) (TV) (composer: theme music / musical director)
- Walt Disney World Christmas Day Parade (2008) (TV) (musical director)
- Yanni: Voices (2008) (TV) (orchestrator)
- Yanni Live! The Concert Event (2006) (TV) (orchestrator)
- Revenge of the Mummy: The Ride (2004) (composer: additional music)

Preceded by Troels Brun Folmann	Tomb Raider composer 2008	Succeeded by Jason Graves
