= Project Snowblind =

2005 video game

Project: Snowblind
- Developer: Crystal Dynamics (Note: Ported to Xbox and Microsoft Windows by Nixxes Software.)
- Publisher: Eidos Interactive
- Producer: John Chowanec
- Designers: Zak McClendon; Jason Weesner
- Writer: Richard Gaubert
- Composer: Troels Brun Folmann
- Platforms: PlayStation 2, Xbox, Windows
- Release: PlayStation 2: NA: February 22, 2005; EU: March 4, 2005; Xbox: NA: February 22, 2005; EU: March 11, 2005; Windows: NA: March 15, 2005; EU: April 1, 2005
- Genre: First-person shooter
- Modes: Single-player, multiplayer

Project: Snowblind is a 2005 first-person shooter video game developed by Crystal Dynamics and published by Eidos Interactive for PlayStation 2, Xbox and Microsoft Windows. The game follows soldier Nathan Frost, who is enhanced with nanotechnology following injuries on a mission and sent against a military regime known as the Republic. Players control Frost through a series of linear levels, using enhancements both in combat and to manipulate security devices such as cameras. The online multiplayer allows up to sixteen players to take part in modes ranging from team-based to solo battles.

Beginning development in 2004, the game was Crystal Dynamics' first attempt at a first-person shooter and originally planned as part of the Deus Ex series with consultation from original developer Ion Storm. The game eventually evolved into its own product, but retained gameplay elements from its Deus Ex roots. Reception of the game was generally positive.

== Gameplay ==
Similar to the Deus Ex series, the focus of Project: Snowblind's gameplay is giving the player a variety of choices on how to approach any given situation. Although the game is generally linear, most levels feature multiple paths through any given area, allowing players to either rush in guns blazing or attempt to find a more stealthy side-path. Unlike Deus Ex, the game is entirely centered around pure combat, but nonetheless provides the player with multiple options regarding every battle. Every weapon in the game has a secondary fire mode, several of which create exotic effects such as a swarm of drones that will actively seek out and attack enemies. The player can also throw a variety of grenades with different effects, including a riot shield that creates a temporary stationary energy wall for the player to take cover behind. The player can also use a special "Icepick" device to hack enemy cameras, turrets, and robots and use them against enemy forces. The game also features several driveable vehicles. Finally, the player's character possesses a variety of nano-technology augmentations that can be used to grant them various powers.

=== Augmentations ===
One of the main focuses of Project: Snowblind's gameplay is Nathan Frost's nano-technology augmentations. Although most of Frost's augmentations are inactive at the beginning of the game, they become activated as the game progresses, granting Frost additional powers.

=== Multiplayer ===
Project: Snowblind's multiplayer mode features several of the gameplay elements found in the game's single-player campaign, including drivable vehicles, the ability to operate and hack cameras and turrets on the battlefield, and the ability to use augmentation powers.

The Xbox version of Project: Snowblind had the option to download extra content via Xbox Live. The map "Repair Bay" was available for free.

== Synopsis ==
In 2065, a militant regime called the Republic led by the rogue General Yan Lo attacks Hong Kong. An international peacekeeping force stationed in Hong Kong, known as the Liberty Coalition, is tasked with defending the island from the invasion. New soldier Nathan Frost arrives just before a major attack leaves him near death. Granted experimental nanotechnological augmentations, Frost is put in charge of the Coalition's effort to defeat the Republic and killing Yan Lo. They eventually rescue defecting scientist Joseph Liaw, who reveals Yan Lo's plan. Believing technology is weakening humanity, Yan Lo has initiated "Project: Snowblind"; he plans to detonate EMP bombs in New York, Paris, and Hong Kong, destroying the world's technological hubs and triggering a new Dark Age.

In an attempt to stop Project: Snowblind, Frost spearheads a controversial assault on Yan Lo's underground bunker with Liaw's inside knowledge, fighting past Yan Lo's elite augmented guard. He eventually faces Yan Lo, discovering that he is an augmented soldier like Frost. Created twenty years ago using an earlier generation of mechanical augmentation, Yan Lo was driven insane by the technology's painful side effects, fuelling his hatred of technology. Frost manages to fatally injure Yan Lo, but he declares that Project Snowblind will continue before blowing himself up.

In a final attempt to stop Project: Snowblind, Frost launches a final assault on the facility where the EMP bombs are being prepared for distribution, aided by the surviving Coalition soldiers. While his forces hold off the remainder of the Republic forces, Frost enters the facility and destroys the EMP bombs, disconnecting his own augmentations so he can survive the resultant EMP shockwave. The final scene shows Frost and the survivors, including Liaw, walking to the nearest functional Coalition base fifty miles away.

== Development ==
In 2003, following the release of Deus Ex: Invisible War, multiple attempts were made by series developer Ion Storm and publisher Eidos Interactive to create further entries in the Deus Ex series. One of these projects, planned as the third series entry following Invisible War, was titled Deus Ex: Clan Wars. As development progressed, the game changed into its own identity and was rebranded as Project: Snowblind. Preproduction for Project: Snowblind began in early 2004, being the first FPS produced by Crystal Dynamics. During its early development, Crystal Dynamics had advice from Ion Storm and series creator Warren Spector. As development progressed, the game evolved into its own entity and took an original name.

The music was composed by Troels Brun Folmann, who became involved with the game after joining the company to complete research for a PhD thesis. Project Snowblind was Folmann's second score after Robin Hood: Defender of the Crown. He was invited to score the game to further his research into video game music. The game's directors wanted Folmann to create an "epic orchestral score with eastern/ethnic elements".

The Xbox and PC versions were created by Nixxes Software. The multiplayer middleware was provided by Quazal in a partnership with Eidos. Crystal Dynamics used Quazal's Net-Z and Rendez-Vous software models to allow a large player number for matches, real-time communication, and easy matching-making for sessions.

== Reception ==
Reception

Aggregate score
Aggregator	Score		
Aggregator	PC	PS2	Xbox
Metacritic	76/100	78/100	79/100

Review scores
Publication	Score		
Publication	PC	PS2	Xbox
1Up.com	B−	B+	B+
Eurogamer	N/A	7/10	N/A
Game Informer	N/A	8.25/10	8.25/10
GamePro	N/A	3/5	3.5/5
GameRevolution	N/A	B−	B−
GameSpot	7.7/10	8.3/10	8.3/10
GameSpy	4/5	4/5	4/5
IGN	8/10	8.8/10	8.8/10
Official Xbox Magazine (US)	N/A	N/A	8.4/10

The game received "favorable" reviews on all platforms according to video game review aggregator Metacritic. It was criticized for its short length and inactive multiplayer, but was praised for its surprisingly entertaining gameplay.
