= Zynga Eugene =

American video game developer

- Formerly: Buzz Monkey Software (2001–2012)
- Type: Subsidiary
- Industry: Video games
- Founded: 2001
- Headquarters: Eugene, Oregon, U.S.
- Key people: Randy Thompson; Jon Milnes; Steve Cordon; Barry Drew
- Number of employees: 55
- Parent: Zynga

Zynga Eugene (formerly Buzz Monkey Software) is an American video game developer based in Eugene, Oregon. The company was founded as Buzz Monkey Software in late 2001 by four former Dynamix employees: senior producer Randy Thompson, senior engineers Jon Milnes and Steve Cordon, and lead artist Barry Drew.

It was acquired by Zynga in 2012, becoming Zynga Eugene.

== History ==
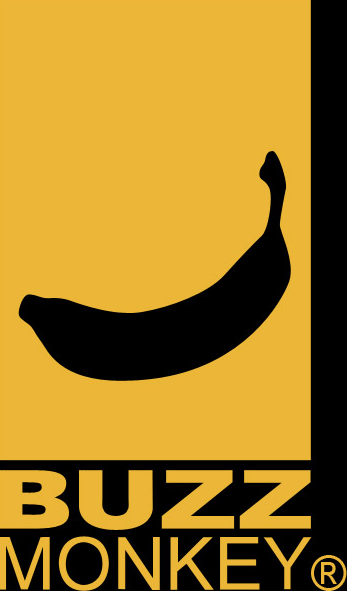
Former company logo

Buzz Monkey got its start by developing and co-developing licensed property games for the PlayStation 2 and PC systems for publishers such as Simon & Schuster Interactive, WildTangent, Vivendi Universal Games, Midway Games, and Sony Computer Entertainment. Buzz Monkey also provided online game lobby development for developer Insomniac Games for the PlayStation 2 titles Ratchet: Deadlocked and Ratchet & Clank: Up Your Arsenal.

In 2005, Buzz Monkey began working on a South Park game for Ubisoft to be released on the Xbox, PlayStation 2 and, GameCube. The game was set to be similar in gameplay to both The Simpsons: Hit & Run and Grand Theft Auto. The studio planned to be the first to fully map out the town of South Park with this project as well as planning to include features such as split screen multiplayer. This project reportedly spent roughly 10 months in development before being cancelled for unknown reasons. Many years later in 2015 the game was discovered on an Xbox dev kit and footage would later be released.

In June 2006, publisher Eidos Interactive released Tomb Raider: Legend, an action title developed by Buzz Monkey for the PlayStation Portable (PSP). Later that year in November 2006, American publisher Electronic Arts released NFL Street 3, an arcade-style football title developed by Buzz Monkey for the PlayStation 2 and PSP. NFL Street 3 won "Best Alternative Sports Game" of 2006 from IGN.

In June 2007, Eidos Interactive released another Buzz Monkey title, Tomb Raider: Anniversary, for the PlayStation 2 and PSP, which was co-developed with Crystal Dynamics. Later that year, Eidos Interactive released the Buzz Monkey-developed Nintendo Wii and Xbox 360 versions of Tomb Raider: Anniversary.

In November 2008, Eidos Interactive published the Buzz Monkey developed title Tomb Raider Underworld for the Wii. Buzz Monkey also provided animation and programming support to Crystal Dynamics for the development of the Xbox 360 and PlayStation 3 versions of that same game.

On June 4, 2012, the company was acquired by Zynga.

== Video games ==
- Rinth Island (iPhone/iPad, 2012)
- Fluid Monkey (iPhone/iPad, 2011)
- The Tomb Raider Trilogy (PS3, 2011)
- Block Rogue (iPhone/iPad, 2011)
- ESPNU College Town (Facebook, 2010)
- Army of Two: The 40th Day (PSP, 2010)
- Tony Hawk: Ride (Wii, 2009)
- Tomb Raider: Underworld (PS2/Wii, 2008)
- Tomb Raider: Anniversary (PS2/PSP/Xbox 360/Wii, 2007)
- Tomb Raider: Legend (PSP, 2006)
- NFL Street 3 (PS2/PSP, 2006)
- Happy Feet (PS2/GameCube/Wii/Windows, 2006) – original game design
- Outlaw Volleyball (PS2, 2004)
- Outlaw Golf (PS2, 2003)
- Witchblade: The Game (PC, 2002)
- Lilo & Stitch Pinball (PC, 2002)

The developer had also worked on an unreleased video game version of a South Park video game for the Xbox.
