= Meagan Marie =

American creative professional

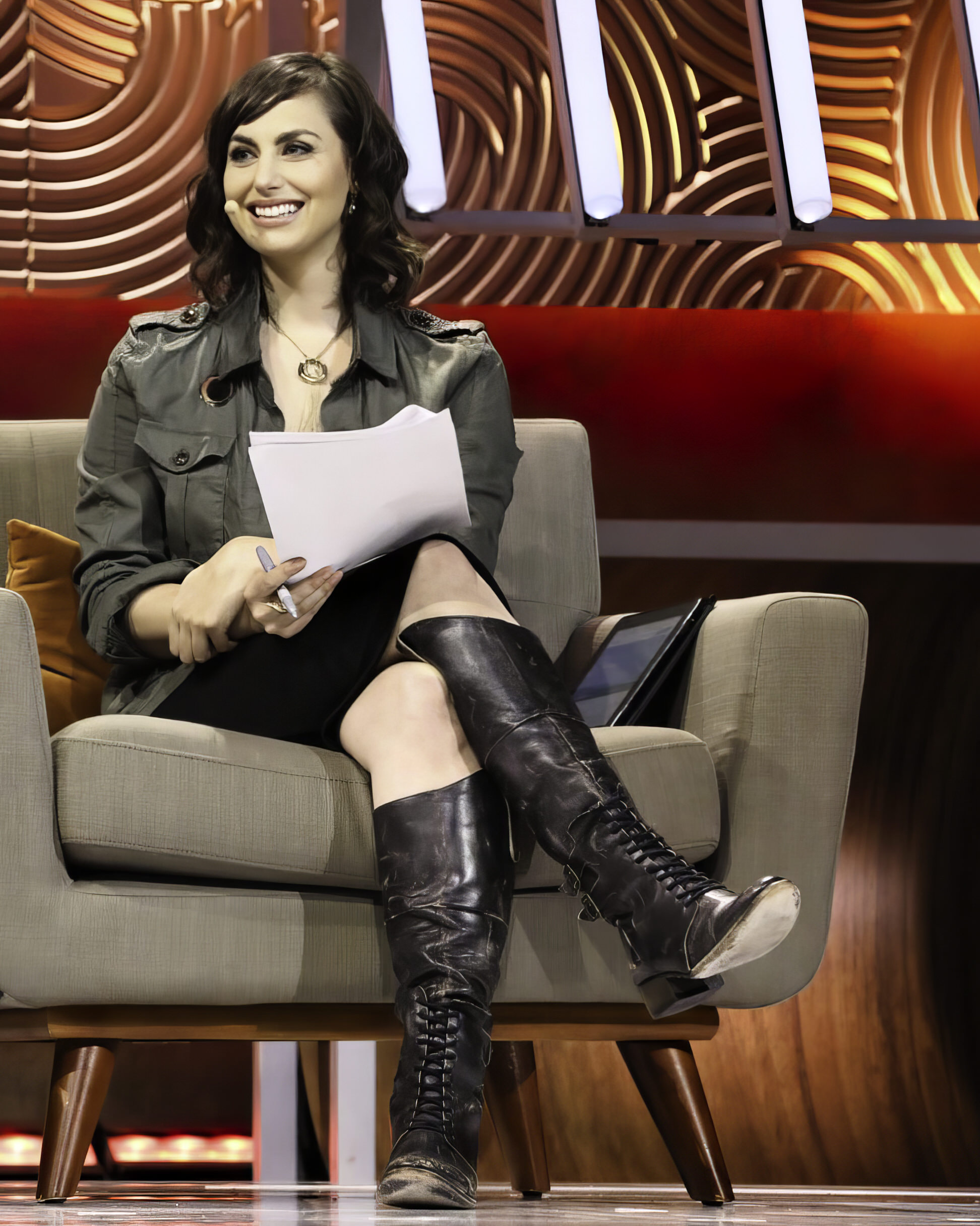
- Born: June 13, 1985 (age 41)
- Citizenship: United States
- Education: University of Minnesota College of Design
- Occupations: Director of Brand Creative; Online community manager Video game journalist (former)
- Years active: 2006–present
- Employer(s): Game Informer (2008-2011); Riot Games (2014); Crystal Dynamics (2011–present)
- Website: www.meaganmarie.com

Meagan Marie (born June 13, 1985) is an American creative professional who is employed by video game developer Crystal Dynamics as the Director of Brand Creative.

As a former video game journalist, Marie reported on various video games for Game Informer. Marie briefly worked for Riot Games in 2014. Marie has authored a number of publications, including Women in Gaming: 100 Professionals of Play which was published in December 2018. She is an active and well-known member of video game fandom who participates in cosplay subculture, wearing costumes and fashion accessories at various conventions and events to represent specific fictional characters.

== Career ==
From January 2006 to January 2009, Marie was an editor and event coordinator at Girls Entertainment Network. She initially applied for a position at Game Informer prior to her graduation, but her application was declined by then-editor-in-chief, Andy McNamara, who implored her to complete her college education prior to embarking on a full-time career in the video game industry. Her subsequent application which she made after her graduation was accepted, and she joined Game Informer as an editor in March 2008. During her time at Game Informer, she was responsible for the magazine's cover stories of several major video games, including Portal 2 and the 2013 Tomb Raider reboot.

By 2011, she left Game Informer for a position at Crystal Dynamics as an online community manager. She was offered the position by Crystal Dynamics management, who were impressed with her passion and knowledge of the Tomb Raider intellectual property. Her responsibilities include managing the brand presence of Crystal Dynamics' intellectual property on social media, engaging with players on online platforms and at events worldwide, and assuming the role of a studio spokesperson. Marie is also a contributor for the creative direction of the Tomb Raider brand and its protagonist, Lara Croft. From April 2014 to September 2014, Marie worked at the Dublin branch of Riot Games after accepting a job offer from a recruiter, where she was responsible for promoting and developing programs to build the League of Legends fan community in Europe. As of 2022, Marie is employed at Crystal Dynamics with the position of Director of Community. In 2026, Marie was promoted to the position of Director of Brand Creative.

Marie has made writing contributions to a number of promotional publications, including 2016's 20 Years of Tomb Raider and 2017's Playing With Super Power: Nintendo Super NES Classics, both published by Prima Games. A notable work by Marie is the 2018 publication Women in Gaming: 100 Professionals of Play, which features 100 profiles covering women from various professional backgrounds in the video game industry, such as designers, entrepreneurs marketers and retailers. Marie intended for the book to be used as a resource as well as a source of inspiration for women interested in a career in the games industry. Women in Gaming was published by Prima Games on December 4, 2018, though the company shut down soon after the book's launch. Marie later approached her employer Crystal Dynamics about the rights to the book, who agreed to acquire it. It was released it as a free download on the studio's website in March 2021. In recognition of her work to highlight the roles of women professionals in the video game industry, Marie is regarded by some media outlets as an authority with regards to the issue of female representation in the industry.

== Cosplay ==
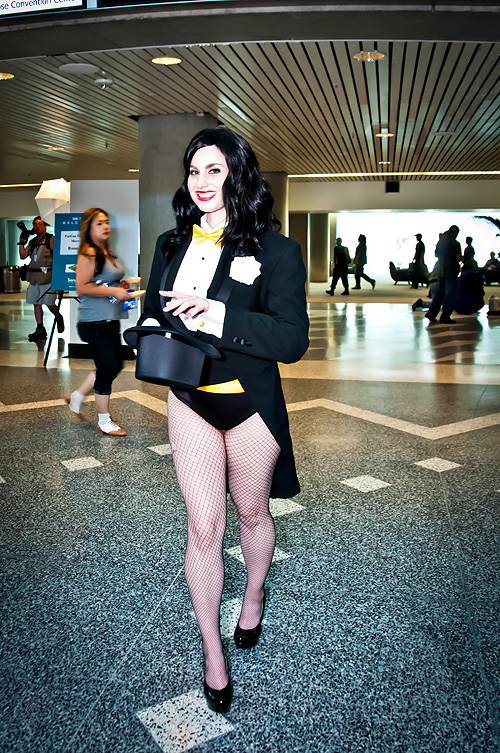
An example of Marie's cosplay work; here, she is portraying the DC Comics character Zatanna.

A cosplay enthusiast, Marie is a frequent participant at conventions and events like San Diego Comic-Con and Supanova Expo. Her activities as a cosplayer has been covered by news media outlets such as Kotaku, IGN, The Mary Sue, Marie Claire, and CNN. Marie is a founder of The Causeplay Shop, a philanthropic organization for members of cosplay community to contribute through online auctions to raise money for various charities.

== Personal life ==
Marie is a longtime fan of video games and video game characters such as Lara Croft since her childhood years, which inspired her to pursue a career in the video game industry as an adult. Marie noted in an interview that her interests in technology and video games intersect with those of her two brothers, and her father's profession as an engineer. During her teenage years, she developed a keen interest to work for Game Informer magazine after discovering that they are based in the same city as her, and advertised her intent on her Myspace profile.

Marie attended the University of Minnesota College of Design, where she studied journalism, mass communication, and graphic design. Marie is bisexual. She married her longtime boyfriend Bastian in 2018. She is currently based in Redwood City, California.

Marie is outspoken about her experiences with incidents of gender discrimination and sexual harassment, and has documented anecdotes from her professional life on social media platforms like her personal Tumblr blog. Her public disclosure about her negative experiences at Riot Games' Dublin branch, including being subjected to inappropriate inquiries and comments concerning her gender, contributed towards drawing media attention to the controversy surrounding the company's workplace culture issues. She was initially reluctant to go public with a detailed account of her experiences due to a fear of backlash and harassment, but felt encouraged to proceed after she witnessed the reticence to believe the women who came forward.
