= List of game companies in the United Kingdom =

This is a list of game companies based in the United Kingdom.

== Game companies in the United Kingdom ==
=== 0 - 9 ===
- 22cans
- 4J Studios

=== A - H ===
- Acid Nerve
- Activision (UK studios)
- Alca Electronics
- AMA Studios
- Antimatter Games
- Astral Forge
- Auroch Digital
- Behaviour Interactive
- Big Robot
- Blue Gravity Studios
- Boss Alien (sold to NaturalMotion)
- Bossa Studios
- Bulldog Interactive
- Chucklefish
- Climax Studios
- Creative Assembly
- Curve Studios
- Dambuster Studios
- Double Eleven
- Dovetail Games
- DR Studios
- Dream Harvest
- Drop Dead Interactive
- Durell Software
- Electronic Arts (United Kingdom Studios)
  - Criterion Games
  - Codemasters
    - Slightly Mad Studios
- Elite Systems
- Enlight Software
- Facepunch Studios
- Fenris Creations (Formerly CCP Games)
- Feral Interactive
- Firebrand Games
- Firefly Studios
- Fireproof Games
- Flix Interactive
- Frontier Developments
- GamelabUK
- Gameloft
- Games Workshop
- Glu Mobile
- Goldhawk Interactive
- Hanako Games
- Hello Games
- Hole in the Sleeve
- Honeyslug

=== I - R ===
- Introversion Software
- Jagex
- Jester Interactive
- Just Add Water
- King
- Kuju Entertainment
  - Headstrong Games
  - Zoë Mode
- Kwalee
- Lucid Games
- Media Molecule
- Mediatonic
- Mind Candy
- NaturalMotion
- nDreams
- Neon Play
- Playtonic
- Pocket Sized Hands
- Positech Games
- Rebellion Developments
- Revolution Software
- Rising Star Games
- Rockstar Games (UK studios)
  - Rockstar Dundee (formerly Ruffian Games)
  - Rockstar Leeds (formerly Möbius Entertainment)
  - Rockstar Lincoln (formerly Tarantula Studios)
  - Rockstar London
  - Rockstar North (formerly DMA Design)
- Runner Duck

=== S - Z ===
- SCE Worldwide (United Kingdom Studios)
  - Firesprite
  - Media Molecule
- Sega Europe
  - Creative Assembly
  - Sports Interactive
- Slitherine
  - AGEod
  - Matrix Games
- Snap Finger Click
- Snappy Gurus
- SockMonkey Studios (sold to Behaviour Interactive)
- Splash Damage
- Square Enix Europe
  - Beautiful Game Studios
  - Square Enix London Studios
- Stainless Games
- Sumo Digital
- Supermassive Games
- The Chinese Room
- Two Point Studios
- Ubisoft (United Kingdom)
  - Ubisoft Reflections (formerly Reflections Interactive)
- Virtual Playground
- Vulcan Software
- Wales Interactive
- Warner Bros. Games (United Kingdom Studios)
  - Rocksteady Studios
  - Traveller's Tales
    - TT Fusion
    - TT Games
- Xbox (United Kingdom Studios)
  - Ninja Theory
  - Playground Games
  - Rare
- Yippee Entertainment
- ZeniMax Europe

== Defunct game companies in the United Kingdom ==
=== A - H ===
- Acclaim Cheltenham (formerly Probe Software/Probe Entertainment) (defunct)
- Acornsoft (defunct)
- Alten8 (defunct or changed name)
- Argonaut Games (defunct)
- Atomic Planet Entertainment (defunct)
- Audiogenic (defunct)
- Automata UK (defunct)
- BBC Multimedia (defunct)
- Bizarre Creations (defunct)
- Black Legend (defunct)
- Black Rock Studio (formerly Climax Group) (defunct)
- Blitz Games Studios (defunct)
  - Volatile Games (defunct)
- Bug-Byte Software Ltd. (defunct)
- CDS Software (defunct)
- Codo Technologies (defunct)
- Confounding Factor (defunct)
- CRL Group (defunct)
- Crytek UK (formerly Free Radical Design) (defunct)
- Dark Energy Digital (defunct)
- Digital Image Design (defunct)
- Domark (defunct)
- Eidos Interactive (defunct)
  - Core Design (defunct)
  - Pivotal Games (defunct)
- Electric Dreams Software (defunct)
- Electronic Arts (United Kingdom Studios)
  - Bullfrog Productions
  - EA Bright Light (formerly EA UK)
  - Playfish (defunct)
- Eurocom (defunct)
- Eutechnyx (defunct)
- Free Radical Design (defunct)
- FinBlade (defunct)
- Flair Software (defunct)
- Graftgold (defunct)
- Greenstreet Software (defunct)
- Gremlin Interactive (defunct)
- Headfirst Productions (defunct)
- Hewson Consultants (defunct)

=== I - R ===
- Imagine Software (defunct)
- Impressions Games (defunct)
- Incentive Software (defunct)
- Intelligent Games (defunct)
- Level 9 Computing (defunct)
- Magnetic Scrolls (defunct)
- Martech (defunct)
- Mastertronic (defunct)
- MC Lothlorien (defunct)
- Microdeal (defunct)
- Midway Studios – Newcastle (defunct)
- Mikro-Gen (defunct)
- Mirage Technologies (defunct)
- Mythos Games (defunct)
- Ocean Software (defunct)
- Palace Software (defunct)
- Particle Systems (defunct)
- Personal Software Services (defunct)
- Pitbull Studio (defunct, merged into Epic Games UK)
- Quicksilva (defunct)
- Rage Software (defunct)
- Realtime Games Software (defunct)
- Realtime Worlds (defunct)
- Rebellion Developments
- Renegade Software (defunct)
- Rowan Software (defunct)
- Runecraft (defunct)

=== S - Z ===
- SCE Worldwide (UK studios)
  - Bigbig Studios (defunct)
  - Evolution Studios (defunct)
  - Guerrilla Cambridge (defunct)
  - Studio Liverpool (defunct) (formerly Psygnosis)
  - Team Soho (defunct)
- Sensible Software (defunct)
- Software Creations (defunct)
- Software Projects (defunct)
- Studio 33 (defunct)
- Swordfish Studios (defunct)
- Talking Birds (defunct)
- Telecomsoft (defunct)
- THQ Digital Studios UK (defunct)
- Tiertex Design Studios (defunct)
- Twilight (defunct)
- Tynesoft (defunct)
- Ubisoft (UK)
  - Ubisoft Leamington (Formerly FreeStyleGames) (defunct)
- U.S. Gold (defunct)
- UTV Ignition Entertainment (defunct)
- Vektor Grafix (defunct)
- Venom Games (defunct)
- Virgin Interactive (defunct)
- VIS Entertainment (defunct)
- Warthog Games (defunct)
- Xbox Game Studios (UK studios)
  - Lionhead Studios (defunct)
- Zoonami (defunct)
- Zushi Games (defunct)

== See also ==
- Lists of companies
