= Football Glory =

1994 video game

- Developer: Croteam
- Publisher: Black Legend
- Designers: Davor Hunski; Roman Ribarić; Dean Sekulić
- Programmers: Alen Ladavac; Admir Elezović; Damir Perović
- Artists: Tomislav Pongrac; Tomislav Mučić; Admir Elezović
- Composer: Marko Sekulić
- Platforms: Amiga, MS-DOS
- Release: Amiga; 6 November 1994; MS-DOS; May 1995
- Genre: Sports
- Modes: Single-player, multiplayer

Football Glory is a 1994 football video game developed by Croteam and published by Black Legend. One or two players compete in football matches viewed from a top-down perspective and modelled after one of six leagues and cups. The players can perform various moves, including tackles and bicycle kicks, and view instant replays of highlights. The pitch is occasionally invaded by dogs, streakers, hooligans, and police.

Football Glory was Croteam's debut game, with the development commencing in April 1993. The core team of six people worked from Zagreb with London-based Richard M. Holmes of Black Legend after the publisher signed with Croteam in 1994. The team took inspiration from past World Cup matches, primarily those of the Brazil national football team. Football Glory was released for the Amiga in November 1994 as the first commercial game developed by a Croatian studio. It was followed by a port for MS-DOS in May 1995 and a budget Amiga release later that year.

Football Glory was frequently compared to Sensible Soccer and noted for its expanded move set. The game's audio and visuals were well received, while interruptions from lengthy animations and some technical issues were criticised. Sensible Soccer developer Sensible Software considered Football Glory a clone and threatened Croteam with legal action, causing Football Glory to be temporarily taken off sale. Croteam released the game as freeware in 1998. The studio finished a five-a-side football successor (known by various names, including Five-A-Side Soccer and Football Glory Indoors) in 1995, which went unreleased as Black Legend folded in 1996. Croteam released it as public-domain software in March 2000.

== Gameplay ==
The player attempted to score with a bicycle kick but hit the crossbar.

Football Glory is a football video game played from a top-down perspective, in a style similar to Sensible Soccer. The two opposing teams are controlled either by two players or by one player and an artificial intelligence (AI). A single player can practise against the AI with several practice modes. In the Champions League, Cup Winners' Cup, UEFA Cup, and English Football League (Premier League and First Division), the players can choose from customisable clubs and adjust season lengths. National teams are available in the qualifications for the European Championship and World Cup. The teams feature real players with abilities according to the statistics adapted from Tactical Manager. The Croatia national football team additionally includes the game's development team. For a match, the teams can be arranged in various formations; there are four in the Amiga version and ten in the port for MS-DOS. Substitutions and tactical changes are available during a match. Each match is played on a pitch with one of four different surfaces and varying weather conditions, including snow, mud, and AstroTurf.

The players can perform tackles, bicycle kicks, volleys, one–two passes, diving headers, and aftertouches, jump over ("ride") opposing characters' tackles, and execute speed bursts. Tapping the shoot button makes a character pass the ball; holding it down longer strengthens the pass and eventually turns it into a shot. Goals are celebrated by the characters and sometimes by fans, who throw fireworks onto the pitch. Highlights—including goals and injuries—evoke commentary and reactions from other characters via speech bubbles. Instant replays displayed in a picture-in-picture window show the last few seconds leading up to these events. In the Amiga version on systems with the Amiga Advanced Graphics Architecture (AGA), this replay runs simultaneously to the gameplay. In the case of injuries, the game is interrupted by the team's coach and, for severe injuries, paramedics, who take away the injured character on a stretcher. If a player disagrees with a refereeing decision, they can chase down and argue with the referee. Dogs, streakers, and hooligans occasionally interrupt the game, the latter two in pursuit by police. Whole matches can be saved and, upon review, replayed from any point.

== Development and release ==
Football Glory was the debut game by Croteam, a Croatian development studio based in Zagreb. The production began in April 1993 and the core development team was composed of the programmers Alen Ladavac, Admir Elezović, and Damir Perović, the artists Tomislav Pongrac, Tomislav Mučić, and Elezović, as well as the musician and sound designer Marko Sekulić. Croteam and Black Legend signed a publishing agreement for the game in 1994. The developer then formed part of the larger Black Legend Croatia, which comprised forty people. Black Legend's founder and director, Richard M. Holmes, oversaw the production from London. He talked with Croteam throughout each day, repeatedly making decisions for ten minutes and then sleeping for the next fifty. According to him, the intent was to create "a fun football game that was better than MicroProse Soccer".

The development team watched several past World Cup games, especially those by the Brazil national football team, to take notes on possible moves. To differentiate Football Glory from other football games, each move was animated with eight to ten frames per second instead of the common two or three frames. Extras like the paramedics with stretchers were also fully animated. When questioned regarding the similarity of Football Glory to Sensible Soccer, Holmes claimed that "the programmer himself has never ever played Sensible Soccer" and that the games only appeared similar because the character sprites in both games were 16×16 pixels in size.

Football Glory was completed for various Amiga systems in October 1994. It was released compatible with the 500, 1200, and 4000 Amiga models on 6 November 1994. This marked the first commercial release of a video game developed by a Croatian studio. A demo was included exclusively on the coverdisk of CU Amiga's November 1994 issue. An MS-DOS conversion was scheduled for release in February 1995. It was completed six months after the Amiga version's release and published in May 1995. A budget Amiga release was published by The Hit Squad in late 1995.

== Reception ==
Reception

Review scores
Publication	Score
Amiga Action	90% 88% (budget)
Amiga Format	80%
Amiga Power	68% (A1200); 66% (A500); 45% (budget)
PC Zone	60/100
CU Amiga	95%
PC Games (UK)	66%
PC Review	6/10
The One	74%

Matt Broughton of The One noted that the realism of Football Glory's physics, especially in respect to the ball's ricocheting, exceeded that of Sensible Soccer. Paul Roundell, in his reviews for Amiga Action, stated that Football Glory played similar to Sensible Soccer apart from the additional moves in Football Glory, which he lauded. This was echoed by Steve McGill of Amiga Format, who felt that the new moves gave Football Glory an advantage over Sensible Soccer, Paul Mellerick of Amiga Power, who called the bicycle kicks "spectacular", and Tony Dillon of CU Amiga, who considered the moves "incredible". However, Mellerick also noted that most of these moves were rarely executable due to insufficient time within a match. The One's Simon Byron further cited an overly complicated control scheme.

McGill lamented that Football Glory featured fewer modes, team formations, and pitches than Sensible Soccer or Sensible World of Soccer. He faulted cluttered menus for giving the game an unpolished feel and regarded the adjustable, coloured backgrounds available on AGA models as a "waste of space" that could have been used for other features. Dillon remarked that Football Glory excelled in terms of graphics due to its many animations. In contrast, Byron considered the animations for extras "pointless", "downright annoying" and (at up to thirty seconds in length) a disruption of the game's flow. The latter was also observed by Dean Evans, who reviewed the game for PC Games and PC Review. Dillon praised the game's audio, especially the reverberation added to the referee's whistle, which he thought added realism. Mellerick noted that the game had poorer sound and performance on the Amiga 500.

Mellerick criticised the game's pass system, in which a ball would reach a teammate almost instantly, as unrealistic. He and Evans regarded the aftertouch as excessive and poorly implemented. Additionally, Mellerick reproved the game's AI, which only appeared either extremely skilled or not skilled at all. Patrick McCarthy of PC Zone faulted the game for not properly applying AI to the player's teammates while not being controlled. Mellerick and Evans concurred that Football Glory was not as good as Sensible Soccer, likening it to "yet another kickabout-in-the-park when compared to the Wembley Stadium of Sensible Soccer" and "[not] half the game that [Sensible Soccer] is", respectively. When Mellerick reviewed Football Glory again for its budget release, he also found that it had not aged well. Contrarily, Dillon exclaimed that Football Glory was "the best arcade soccer game ever" and superior to Sensible Soccer.

=== Sales ===
According to HMV, Football Glory was the third-best-selling Amiga game in January 1995, the fifth-best in February, and the tenth-best in April. The European Leisure Software Publishers Association ranked it second in January 1995, sixth in February, fourteenth in March, tenth in April, sixteenth in May, eleventh in June, and fifteenth in July.

== Legacy ==
Based on the success of Football Glory and Embryo (which Croteam contributed to), Paul McNally of Amiga Action named Croteam as Black Legend's most famous development team. In December 1994, Sensible Software, the developer of Sensible Soccer, accused Football Glory of being a clone. The company's Jon Hare explained that "It's trying to trade on our success. We've got a problem with it." Duncan Lothian of Black Legend defended the game and remarked that Sensible Software's accusations were proof that "Football Glory is frightening the opposition". After Sensible Software threatened Croteam with legal action, Football Glory was removed from sale. Although the game survived Sensible Software's move, it did not recover from its time off-sale and Croteam released it as freeware in 1998. When a demo for one of Croteam's later games, Serious Sam: The First Encounter, attained much popularity after its release in mid-2000, Football Glory was downloaded from Croteam's website more than one thousand times within a few days. According to Holmes, Black Legend decided against producing another football game so it did not repeatedly release similar products akin to the FIFA series. He later cited this as a possible mistake.

A successor to Football Glory featuring five-a-side football was in development by December 1994. There had been no such game before because this variant's walls had been difficult to implement and Holmes claimed that this had been worked out. The game was variously known as Football Glory Indoor Edition, Football Glory Indoors, Indoor Football Glory, Five-A-Side Soccer, and 5-A-Side Soccer, as well as Fußball Total Indoors in Germany. It was initially scheduled to be released in early 1995. This was later delayed to either the Christmas period of 1995 or January 1996. Croteam completed the game in 1995 for the 500, 1200, and 4000 Amiga models. Black Legend exhibited it at the 1995 and 1996 editions of the European Computer Trade Show. Reviews were likewise positive. The company was set to publish the game until its parent company shut it down in 1996 due to a declining Amiga games market. The publisher's German office entered insolvency in July 1996 and attempts to sell the finished game to distributors like Schatztruhe failed. Croteam released the game as public-domain software in March 2000.
