= Gabriel Knight 3: Blood of the Sacred, Blood of the Damned =

1999 video game

- Developer: Sierra Studios
- Publisher: Sierra Studios
- Producer: Steven Hill
- Designer: Jane Jensen
- Programmer: Scott Honn
- Writer: Jane Jensen
- Composers: David Henry; Robert Holmes
- Series: Gabriel Knight
- Platform: Microsoft Windows
- Release: NA: November 19, 1999; EU: November 25, 1999
- Genre: Point-and-click adventure
- Mode: Single-player

Gabriel Knight 3: Blood of the Sacred, Blood of the Damned is a point-and-click adventure game created by Jane Jensen, developed and published by Sierra Studios, and released for Microsoft Windows in 1999. The sequel to 1995's The Beast Within: A Gabriel Knight Mystery, the game's story focuses on the lives of Gabriel Knight (voiced once again by Tim Curry) and Grace Nakimura as they become involved in a case to track down a kidnapped infant, becoming embroiled in a mystery that involves vampires, the Knights Templar, the Holy Grail, and Jesus within the Languedoc province of France; the story itself is inspired by a real-life treasure conspiracy associated to the area.

Following the previous installment, Sierra opted to render the third game in the series in 3D graphics, with a heightened level of puzzle solving and exploration. Jensen, reprising her role from previous Gabriel Knight entries, found inspiration in conspiracy theories revolving around the village of Rennes-le-Château in France, which was recreated in part for the game's setting. In particular she was inspired by The Holy Blood and the Holy Grail and The Tomb of God, two books on Christian conspiracy theories she thought contained "perfect puzzle material".

Work on development was delayed due to difficulties from the team in adapting to the new rendering engine for the game, with some puzzles that were designed found to be complicated and replaced with a number of new puzzles that Jensen did not approve of but could not have changed, including the infamous cat hair mustache puzzle. Although Jensen had approved of the actor who portrayed Gabriel in the last game, it was decided that Curry should return, owing to her belief he provided the right personality for the character.

Gabriel Knight 3 was the last game to be made by Sierra prior to the crash of the adventure video game industry. Although not a commercial success, much like its predecessors, it received mainly positive reviews from critics. Praise was given to the story and its setting along with Le Serpent Rouge, called one of the "best-designed game puzzles" in the adventure game genre. It was criticized for some of its dialogue, Curry's performance, and its transfer to 3D graphics. The game was re-released as part of Sierra's Best Seller Series in 2001, and again for GOG.com, in 2010, and Steam, in 2016.

== Gameplay ==
Gabriel Knight is standing in the hotel lobby. The verb chooser is shown.

Blood of the Sacred, Blood of the Damned is a point-and-click adventure game, played from a third-person perspective. The story is divided into chapters that cover a three-day period of several time blocks, which play out in a linear fashion and places players in control of one of the two playable characters – while Gabriel handles the initial block of chapters, most alternate between him and Grace. In each chapter, players must complete a set of required actions in order to progress the story, but may do so in a non-linear fashion, allowing them to explore locations and conduct optional actions that provide background and context to the game's story and events. In some chapters, completing certain actions will causes changes during that chapter in other locations - these are indicated by the sound of a ticking clock. Each chapter features a variety of locations that the player can visit, some of which are accessed via an overhead map which uses a hint system to highlight key locations that have actions to be performed for that chapter; additional sites become available as the game progresses. As with Sierra games of the time, a running score is used to keep check on actions, both required and optional, that players have completed (i.e. acquiring an object needed for a puzzle).

Interactive objects are highlighted when the cursor is moved over them, to which doing so activates an action bar of "verb" commands that can be conducted by the player. Actions can involve things such as examining an object/person, picking up an item, or talking to a person. As with previous titles, players store items collected in an inventory, and can examine them, use them, combine them, or make them an active object for interactions with other items or people. Conversations with people range from those who provide brief words on things and those who need to be interviewed on topics. For interviews concerning questioning someone for information, an action bar of "verb" topics appears, which can range from asking about a place or object, learning about the person themselves, or questioning them on something they learnt. However, conversations cannot be reviewed after they have been done, as with previous games in the series.

Blood of the Sacred, Blood of the Damned allows players to have full control over the camera's positioning and angle, allowing them to examine a location in detail; the camera is only fixed during cutscenes, close-up shots of objects, and conversations. In addition, if the player's character is not in view, they will spawn someone off-camera near to the current position of the viewpoint. At certain points in the game, players can make use of a laptop for scanning in and comparing evidence, conducting research on topics, linking evidence and items to marked down suspects, and for tackling one of the game's central puzzles. In some situations, the player must overcome a dangerous situation or risk occurring a game-over moment, forcing them to retry, restart the game, or restore a previous save.

== Story ==
=== Setting ===
Blood of the Sacred, Blood of the Damned takes place within a world where the occult and the supernatural exist throughout human history – such as ghosts, cultists and demons. To combat those who use such forces for evil against humanity are the "Schattenjägers" – a German translation of the words "Shadow Hunters" – who take it upon themselves to defend the innocent from such beings; their origins, however, are shrouded in mystery. The game's story is inspired by the conspiracy theories concerning 19th-century parish priest Bérenger Saunière and a secret treasure he hid away around the village of Rennes-le-Château in southern France, incorporating several elements concerning the mythology of vampires and the Holy Grail, the myths surrounding the Knights Templar, and the religious stories of Jesus Christ before and during his crucifixion.

The locations featured in the game included a fictionalized layout of Rennes-le-Château, which faithfully recreates local landmarks such as the Church of Saint Mary Magdalene, alongside the real-life locations of Rennes-les-Bains and Château de Blanchefort, with a mix of fictional landmarks and sites relating to the plot.

=== Characters ===
Players assume the role of Gabriel Knight, voiced by Tim Curry, and Grace Nakimura, voiced by Charity James, throughout the game, using their own methods and approaches to solving their respective part of the investigation they undertake together. During their work, they receive assistance from Frank Mosely (voiced by David Thomas), a police detective from New Orleans. Other main characters in the game include: Emilio Baza, voiced by Billy West; Madeline Buthane, voiced by Jennifer Hale; Vittorio Buchelli, voiced by Joe Lala; Excelsior Montreaux, voiced by John de Lancie; Abbé Arnaud, voiced by Gregg Berger, John Wilkes, voiced by Richard Doyle, Lady Howard, voiced by Samantha Eggar; Estelle Stiles, voiced by Carolyn Seymour, Larry Sinclair, voiced by Corey Burton, and Prince James, voiced by Simon Templeman. Other supporting characters feature the voices of Philippe Bergeron, Rene Auberjonois, Susan Silo, Karen Ross, and Tom Kane.

=== Plot ===
Four years after the events of The Beast Within: A Gabriel Knight Mystery, novelist Gabriel Knight, fulfilling his family's role as Schattenjäger, and Grace Nakimura, his research assistant, receive an invitation from Prince James of Albany, a descendant of the House of Stuart, in Paris. James requests the pair's help in protect his infant son Charlie from "Night Visitors" - beings claimed to be vampires - that have plagued his family for centuries. Agreeing to the job, the pair are overcome by a strange force: while Grace is knocked out, Gabriel is temporarily paralyzed and forced to watch Charlie being kidnapped. Pursuing the kidnappers to a south-bound train, Gabriel is knocked out by them; when he recovers, he finds himself outside the town of Couiza, where a station porter helps him to a hotel in the nearby village of Rennes-le-Château.

The next morning, Gabriel calls James to report his location, but is confused when he is asked to investigate until James' men can take over. Following the call, he learns that a treasure hunting group arrived at the hotel the same time he did, whose members include: Madeline Buthane, the tour's leader; Vittorio Buccheilli, an Italian tourist; John Wilkes, an Australian treasure hunter; Emilio Baza, a Middle Eastern tourist; and Frank Mosely, Gabriel's police detective friend from New Orleans. During a search of the region, he discovers the kidnapping has a connection with a treasure hidden near to Rennes-le-Château, linked with the Knights Templar and the Holy Grail. After James' men arrive with Grace, Gabriel tails them, witnessing the men interrogate local priest Abbe Arnaud, and greeting historical writer Larry Sinclair with a Masonic handshake. Both Gabriel and Grace decide to continue the investigation, aided by Frank.

The next day, while Gabriel searches the rooms of the tour group - discovering Buthane and Vittorio to be concealing secrets about themselves - Grace joins the tour to learn more about the hidden treasure in the region. After a visit to a local winery, owned by Excelsior Montreaux, she and the group come across the bodies of James' men. Gabriel examines the crime scene with Frank, finding the victims were brutally murdered and drained of their blood; he deduces the killers were vampires. Gabriel informs James of what happened, before later confronting Larry about their visit; he later spies him setting his alarm clock for later that night. After questioning the group, Grace suggests to him to visit Montreaux, expressing suspicions his winery was deeply unsettling in its decor and setup. Posing as a journalist, Gabriel meets him, and notes his views on wine-making are strangely odd and creepy.

In the evening, Grace comes across an envelope containing a document known as Le Serpent Rouge, whose riddles, when solved, pinpoit the valley's treasure. Managing to solve some of its riddles, she is interrupted by Wilkes, who offers her dinner. Grace accepts, and discovers he found a hollow chamber under the valley through seismological surveys, but is forced to leave him when he makes a drunken pass at her. Later that night, Gabriel heads out into the valley, and witnesses Larry bury a manuscript which he recovers. After returning to the hotel, he experiences a nightmare about vampires, caushing him and Grace to sleep together. In the morning, Grace reveals the manuscript explains how Jesus Christ had descendants, and covers his bloodlines following his crucifixion. After Gabriel finds Wilkes had disappeared from the hotel that night, he finds his body near a local landmark, killed in the same fashion as James' men.

Grace continues her work on Le Serpent Rouge and discovers the riddle's answers conform to Wilkes' findings. After completing the riddles, she and Gabriel find the manuscript missing. Grace eventually recovers it after Prince James arrives in the village, whereupon she and Gabriel confront Frank, Buthane and Vittorio. Buthane is revealed to a French intelligence agent and Vittorio a priest from the Vatican, both of whom reveal they were investigating recent activity in the region; Frank admits to recently signing up with the CIA, who were investigating Freemason problems in France. Gabriel returns the manuscript to James, who is accompanied by his manservant Mesmi, and Larry. He confirms his family has a connection to Jesus, and is fearful that Charlie's lineage was the motive for his kidnapping. Gabriel later revisits Montreaux, and confirms him to be behind the kidnapping; he is forced to flee when his real identity is exposed.

During his absence, Grace meets with Emilio, who reveals that he and Montreaux were once members of a brotherhood that protected Jesus called the Magi. After his crucifixion, the pair drank his blood becoming immortal; while Montreaux reveled in it and became a vampire, Emilio regretted his actions and swore to protect Jesus' descendants from Montreaux's group. Made aware that Charlie is likely to be sacrificed for his blood, Gabriel, accompanied by Mesmi and Frank, descend into the chambers built by the Templars to house Jesus' remains, where the infant was taken. Following a heated battle, Gabriel kills Montreaux after he summons a demon, whereupon he touches the remains and learns the origins of his family's role as Schattenjägers; Emilio later removes the body to a safer location. After Charlie is returned to his father, Gabriel goes to see Grace with the good news, but discovers she has gone, having left to follow her own path in life.

== Development ==
Jane Jensen began designing Gabriel Knight 3 in December 1996. By the time work began on Blood of the Sacred, Blood of the Damned, it was already clear to the development team that it would be the final Gabriel Knight game. Jane Jensen remarked that "we were the last dinosaur on the block. We had until the game shipped, and then it would be over". Nonetheless, Sierra felt the series should move to 3D graphics to keep up with the times. The development team had little experience with or understanding of the format; when programmer Scott Bilas was brought on board mid-production, he was told that the game was nearly finished, only to find that the team had left out a number of features that were needed to make the game playable. The game was announced in mid-August 1997.

Jensen was heavily inspired by The Holy Blood and the Holy Grail, a speculative non-fiction book that posits the Merovingian dynasty were direct descendants of Jesus Christ. This book, which also later inspired The Da Vinci Code, was used as the basis for the game's plot and setting. According to Jensen, Gabriel Knight 3 was always intended to be about vampires, but after reading Holy Blood, Holy Grail she became fascinated with the conspiracy theories around Rennes-le-Château. Another book on the topic, The Tomb of God, was used as the basis for Le Serpent Rouge puzzle. Jensen said "I realized that Rennes-le-Château was perfect puzzle material and fit in with the vampire theme quite well."

The team's struggles with the technology led to a number of delays. Alluding to an infamous puzzle early in the game in which Knight must use tape to get hair from a cat and use it to make a fake mustache, Bilas recalled: "It was terrible! There was something that Jane [Jensen] wanted to do that was just too hard, too expensive, too complicated to make it happen. I think our producer came up with the cat puzzle [as a replacement]. I'm pretty sure Jane didn't like it. None of the developers liked it, but we were really late and needed to get something in there".

Though she was satisfied by Dean Erickson's performance in the previous game, Jensen felt that Tim Curry represented the real voice of Gabriel Knight and opted to have him return to the role.

=== Soundtrack ===
The game's score was composed by David Henry, based on themes created by the series' original composer, Robert Holmes. In every Gabriel Knight game, the popular gospel hymn "When the Saints Go Marching In" can be heard, albeit in different remixes and forms. In Gabriel Knight 3, it can be heard in the San Greal Tavern in Rennes-les-Bains.

== Reception ==
Reception

Aggregate score
Aggregator	Score
Metacritic	80 of 100

Review scores
Publication	Score
Adventure Gamers	4/5
CNET Gamecenter	8 of 10
Computer Games Strategy Plus	3.5/5
Computer Gaming World	2/5
EP Daily	9 of 10
Eurogamer	7 of 10
GamePro	3/5
GameRevolution	A−
GameSpot	6.7 of 10
IGN	8.3 of 10
Next Generation	4/5
PC Accelerator	8 of 10
PC Gamer (US)	80%
The Sydney Morning Herald	4/5

Awards
Publication	Award
CNET Gamecenter	Adventure
Computer Games Strategy Plus	Adventure Game of the Year

Gabriel Knight 3 received favorable reviews according to the review aggregation website Metacritic. Uros Jojic of IGN said the game "proves that adventure games still have some life left in them" and provides "a welcome change for the action-heavy PC market" with "[an] excellent story and well worked out plot". At the same time, he criticized Tim Curry's voice-over, as "a cold and over-exaggerated interpretation of the southern accent", and the switch to 3D which they felt "is not yet ready to depict the emotions and feelings in the way actors can". Erik Wolpaw of GameSpot shared the sentiments about Curry's "terrible acting job", calling the "fake accent and overly dramatic delivery [...] almost unbearable". The dialogue was also criticized, as were the puzzles, the latter which fortunately "get better as the story progresses". The story itself was more positively received, including "some excellent plot elements" and "fascinating" connections between fact and fiction. Dan Ravipinto of Adventure Gamers found some of the smaller puzzles "outright silly", but at the same time the vast Le Serpent Rouge "one of the best-designed puzzles in adventure gaming history". The storyline with its "interesting narratives" was called "epic in every sense of the word" and the game "ultimately a success". Jeff Lundrigan of NextGen said of the game, "It's a cliché, but: if you are really into adventure games – and one heck of a puzzle solver – man, is this a rare treat."

In May 2000, Jane Jensen remarked that the "sales of Gabriel Knight 3 were not sufficient to offset the cost of development given that we had to build a new engine."

The game was named the best computer adventure game of 1999 by Computer Games Strategy Plus and CNET Gamecenter, and was a runner-up for Computer Gaming World's, The Electric Playground's, GameSpot's, PC PowerPlay's, and GameSpy's awards in this category. The staff of Computer Games wrote: "While the game does, at times, feature some klunky dialogue, over-the-top acting, and weak 3D graphics, it delivers a compelling universe, one that's well-realized and filled with detail". During the 3rd Annual Interactive Achievement Awards, the Academy of Interactive Arts & Sciences nominated Gabriel Knight 3 for "Computer Adventure/Role-Playing Game of the Year".

In 2011, Adventure Gamers listed it as the 32nd-best adventure game ever released.

== Legacy ==
In August 2000, the game was mentioned by the staff of CNET Gamecenter as one of the "true adventure games" that failed to get sales. They cited the reason: "Now it seems people want more action than adventure. They would rather run around in short shorts raiding tombs than experience real stories. People want it simple. Even in the fight between two first-person shooters with adventure leanings, the simpler of the two (Half-Life) won out over the more imaginative (System Shock 2). The golden days are gone; the dream is over. Casual gamers killed adventure gaming, and Myst made them do it." Cliff Hicks made a point about the vanishing adventure genre: "There's no way to beat this one, we're afraid, and we don't think we'll see these games make a return, not for a long time, anyway. Sierra, the pioneer in this field, seems to have given it up. Sierra cancelled the last Space Quest game, there isn't another Gabriel Knight game in the works, and King's Quest is MIA. Alas, adventure, we hardly knew ye." A month later, Erik Wolpaw of Old Man Murray used Gabriel Knight 3 and its "Mosely disguise" puzzle as an "alternate theory of who killed adventure gaming". He concluded his hypothesis with: "Who killed Adventure Games? I think it should be pretty clear at this point that Adventure Games committed suicide."
