= Serious Sam: The First Encounter =

2001 video game

- Developer: Croteam (Note: The Palm OS version was developed by InterActive Vision.)
- Publisher: Gathering of Developers (Note: The game was published for Palm OS by Global Star Software and for the Xbox by Gotham Games. Devolver Digital published the HD and VR versions, co-publishing the Xbox 360 HD release with Majesco.)
- Designers: Davor Hunski; Davor Tomičić; Roman Ribarić
- Programmers: Alen Ladavac; Davor Hunski; Dean Sekulić
- Artists: Admir Elezović; Tomislav Pongrac; Dinko Pavičić
- Composer: Damjan Mravunac
- Series: Serious Sam
- Engine: Serious Engine
- Platforms: Windows; Palm OS; Xbox; HD; Windows; Xbox 360; Stadia; Nintendo Switch; PlayStation 4; Xbox One; VR; Linux; Windows
- Release: 21 March 2001: Windows; 21 March 2001; Palm OS; December 2001; Xbox; 12 November 2002; Windows (HD); 24 November 2009; Xbox 360 (HD); 13 January 2010; Linux, Windows (VR); 30 March 2017; Stadia (HD); 3 March 2020; Switch, PS4, XONE (HD); 17 November 2020
- Genre: First-person shooter
- Modes: Single-player, multiplayer

Serious Sam: The First Encounter is a 2001 first-person shooter game developed by Croteam and published by Gathering of Developers. It is the first in the Serious Sam series. The game follows the soldier Sam "Serious" Stone, who is sent back in time to ancient Egypt in 1378 BCE to uncover information about the technologically advanced civilisation of the Sirians that could help humanity survive the attacks of extraterrestrial forces in the 22nd century. As Sam, the player traverses linear levels, either enclosed or set on open plains, and battles increasingly large waves of enemies with an expanding arsenal. During gameplay, the player can pick up new weapons and replenishment for ammunition and health, as well as review strategic information. In multiplayer, the game has two deathmatch modes and cooperative play for the single-player campaign.

Development began in 1996, after Croteam had moved away from creating games for the since-defunct Amiga family of home computers. Unable to afford a commercial game engine, the studio developed S-Cape3D alongside In the Flesh, a story-driven first-person shooter inspired by Half-Life. This concept was abandoned as Croteam's chief executive officer, Roman Ribarić, considered it not achievable due to the team's size. In 1999, he and the programmer Alen Ladavac devised the name "Serious Sam" and a new narrative. Having little funding and no success in finding a publisher, Croteam turned to licensing out its engine (since renamed Serious Engine) and released a vertical slice as a demo in May 2000. The latter saw the game attain much popularity, especially after Erik Wolpaw interviewed Ribarić for the website Old Man Murray, and Croteam eventually signed a publishing agreement with On Deck Interactive, the budget-price games division of Gathering of Developers. After the division was shut down, Serious Sam was moved over to Gathering of Developers and released on 21 March 2001.

The game received positive reviews, with critics praising its engine, gameplay, presentation, sound, and humour. Mixed opinions were raised regarding the game's multiplayer modes and repetitiveness, while its puzzle elements were criticised as too trivial. Due to its budget price, several reviewers cited the game's price–performance ratio as particularly positive, leading to scorn when the game was released in the United Kingdom with a price double that in the United States. The game won multiple year-end accolades, including game of the year from GameSpot.

The First Encounter was followed by Serious Sam: The Second Encounter in February 2002. Both games have been combined into one in several packages, including an Xbox port released by Gotham Games in November 2002. With the publisher Devolver Digital, Croteam developed a remake, Serious Sam HD: The First Encounter, that was first released in November 2009 and later brought to Xbox 360, Stadia, Nintendo Switch, PlayStation 4, and Xbox One. A virtual reality version of that remake, Serious Sam VR: The First Encounter, was released in March 2017.

== Gameplay ==
Sam fighting Scythian Witch-Harpies using a rocket launcher

Serious Sam: The First Encounter is a first-person shooter with an optional third-person perspective. As Sam "Serious" Stone, the player traverses fifteen mostly linear levels. Two of them are hidden levels. Some maps are set on open plains while others are enclosed. Several props, including torches that act as light sources, are destructible. Large numbers of enemies of varying sizes attack Sam simultaneously with increasing difficulty. There are nineteen enemy variants. Several approach Sam in a straight line and others fire projectiles, incentivising circle strafing. The Beheaded Kamikaze approaches Sam quickly and blows himself up once close enough. Foes may appear, in waves or individually, as the player passes triggers within each level. Others are hidden behind large structures like walls and hills. All enemies emit sounds that help the player to determine their type and direction of attack. Some spaces are arenas that need to be cleared of enemies before the player can proceed. Certain rooms need to be unlocked by pressing buttons, pulling levers, or collecting and using keys. Some levels feature bosses, many have hidden items and areas.

The game contains ten weapons. By default, Sam is equipped with a combat knife and a revolver with unlimited ammunition. A second revolver enables dual wielding, and other weapons include a shotgun with a double-barrelled variant, Thompson submachine gun, minigun, laser gun, rocket launcher, grenade launcher, and handheld cannon. Apart from the revolvers and shotguns, none of the weapons need to be reloaded. The player may replenish ammunition and health, as well as acquire new weapons, via collectibles, though some act as triggers that spawn enemies. Eliminating foes increases the player's score, which is tracked by a scoreboard. The game includes quick saves and the ability to record gameplay demos. A specialised interface provides information about encountered enemies, weapons, and locations, as well as statistics and strategic clues. The player can choose from five difficulty settings, which affect the enemies' damage and count, as well as Sam's movement speed and fire rate.

The First Encounter supports multiplayer via the internet and local area networks, as well as split screen for up to four players. Deathmatch modes can be played on five dedicated maps, with the "Scorematch" mode valuing player performances by obtained score and the "Fragmatch" mode considering only the number of kills. All single-player levels can be played in a cooperative mode that scales up the number of enemies relative to the number of players.

== Plot ==
Serious Sam: The First Encounter begins with recounting how humans in the early 21st century found buried artefacts of the Sirians, an ancient but technologically advanced alien civilisation, which enabled them to explore the universe at large. However, in 2104, they were attacked by forces commanded by the alien overlord Mental. Humanity was pushed back from Alpha Centauri to the Solar System and eventually Earth, where it faced its eradication. As their last hope, world leaders agreed to send the undefeated soldier Sam "Serious" Stone (voiced by John Dick) back in time using the Time-Lock, a Sirian device able to transport only one person.

Sam arrives in 1378 BCE, at the mortuary temple of Hatshepsut in Deir el-Bahari. His Neurotronically Implanted Combat Situation Analyzer (NETRICSA) tasks him with uncovering knowledge about the life of the Sirians in ancient Egypt in the two centres of power: Memphis and Thebes. However, Thebes has been magically locked down since a riot instigated by Memphis rulers, in which these rulers had stolen the sign of Amun-Ra, an item of great value but unclear purpose. NETRICSA guides Sam to retrieve four magical elements that would enable his entry into Thebes. He finds the first to have been removed from the temple of Thutmose I and instead obtains it at the entry of the tomb of Ramesses III, as well as the second at its exit. Sam continues through the Valley of the Kings, acquiring the third element in the Chambers of Horus and the fourth in a shrine at a nearby oasis.

Sam heads into Memphis and recovers the sign of Amun-Ra at the Temple of Ptah. In possession of the sign and four elements, he proceeds towards Thebes. The journey takes multiple days and he is forced to abandon most of his ammunition due to its weight. At the Avenue of Sphinxes, Sam enters Thebes through Karnak using the four elements and sets out to determine the purpose of the sign of Amun-Ra. In Luxor, NETRICSA uncovers that the sign had frequently been used in a Theban ritual to summon their deities, which ceased after it had been stolen. NETRICSA leads Sam to the ritual site, where its rising obelisk activates and reveals itself to be a transmitter steering a spaceship to the Great Pyramid. Sam hurries there but is chased by Ugh-Zan III, the last warlock giant. Unable to defeat him, Sam quickly enters the pyramid and uses the sign of Amun-Ra to reach its top. He faces Ugh-Zan III again and kills him by activating the spaceship's tractor beam, which only allows entry to particular species. Finally, Sam boards the spaceship and takes off.

== Development and release ==
=== S-Cape3D and In the Flesh ===
Serious Sam: The First Encounter was developed by Croteam, a Croatian development studio based in the Utrina neighbourhood of Zagreb. Before its development, Croteam had principally worked on games for the Amiga family of home computers, creating Football Glory (1994), Save the Earth (1995), and 5-A-Side Soccer (1996). By the release of 5-A-Side Soccer, the Amiga had been discontinued, so Croteam shifted its focus to PC game development in 1995. The development of Serious Sam began in 1996. Initially, members of Croteam were still at various universities, studying either computer science, informatics, or economics. Unable to afford to license a commercial game engine, the studio created its own using Microsoft Visual C++ and OpenGL, with the programmer Alen Ladavac leading the development. They had been working on a clone of the engine for Wolfenstein 3D—which simulates 3D environments with 2D graphics through ray casting—and planned to use it to convert a Croatian role-playing game from the Amiga to PC. With the rising popularity of Doom, the team soon chose to pursue a first-person shooter instead.

During the engine's development, they incorporated vertical camera movement akin to Duke Nukem 3D and later fully modelled 3D environments like in Quake. They paired these changes with hardware-based rendering due to the rise of 3D-accelerated graphics processing units (GPUs). The engine was optimised for low-end hardware with a proprietary physics implementation while aiming for large outdoor areas and for many enemies to be visible at a time. They implemented large quantities of projectiles using a "caching ahead system" that would calculate all possible collisions for a moving projectile a few seconds in advance. Collisions were approximated using spheres, which were easier to calculate and allowed for additional gameplay elements like multi-directional gravity. Having a proprietary engine allowed Croteam to incorporate unique features, especially large numbers of simultaneously displayed enemies, which Croteam's chief executive officer, Roman Ribarić, said had been missing from other games of the time due to limiting technology, leading to less action-oriented games. Dean Sekulić worked on the engine's optimisation and GPU compatibility, often being in contact with technicians at GPU manufacturers like Matrox, Nvidia, and 3dfx to sort out issues.

Croteam announced Flesh, a multiplayer first-person shooter, in September 1996, planning to release it in February 1997. The name was later changed to In the Flesh, with the engine called S-Cape3D. Ribarić and Davor Hunski designed all enemies, with the Beheaded Kamikaze and Sirian Werebull, which remained in the finished game, among the first elements to be created in 1996. Dinko Pavičić joined Croteam during the development and created all character textures. Ribarić also worked on the game's sound design, initially having the Beheaded Kamikaze shout "banzai" while approaching the player, though this was later changed to a generic scream in case Croteam would be working with Japanese partners. That scream is voiced by Ribarić, who recreated it from a stock sound effect.

=== Serious Sam rework and demo ===
For In the Flesh, the team initially devised a dark, story-driven game, later inspired by Half-Life. However, Ribarić believed the team was too small to accomplish such a complicated game and chose to scrap the story. In 1999, he and Ladavac instead came up with the name "Serious Sam". Ladavac, a fan of science fiction, wrote a new narrative around it, drawing inspiration from writers like Isaac Asimov, Roger Zelazny, J. R. R. Tolkien, Douglas Adams, Terry Pratchett, and Robert Asprin. Despite objections from other team members, including Hunski (who was undergoing his compulsory military service in the Armed Forces of Croatia at the time) and Sekulić, Ribarić held on to the name and it became a better fit as the game progressed away from its former story and into brighter, colourful environments. S-Cape3D was consequently renamed Serious Engine, its level editor became Serious Editor, and the 3D modelling software was named Serious Modeler. Serious Editor was designed as a WYSIWYG tool so the team, mostly comprising programmers, could create levels as efficiently as possible. Davor Tomičić designed roughly sixty levels with various environments for experimentation. He found that vast, flat planes topped with large structures like pyramids worked well as levels, although they pushed the limits of the engine. Other themes included the Lava Planet, Water Planet, and Ice Planet. In 1999, Damjan Mravunac joined Croteam as the composer before also replacing Ribarić as the sound designer. He ended up remaking most of Ribarić's sounds. His primary influences were Doom and Quake for the sounds, and he took musical inspiration from the games Agony and Lost Patrol, as well as film scores from composers like John Williams, Hans Zimmer, and Ennio Morricone. Both were recorded using a Sound Blaster Live! sound card, which Mravunac chose after facing driver issues with other cards. Croteam then designed an adaptive music system that changes between three versions of a song during gameplay: the "peace" music outside of battles, "combat" upon encountering enemies, and "war" when the player faces many foes.

Because the developers' parents were Croteam's sole source of funding, the team eventually began searching for a publisher. In 2000, Croteam burned the game with forty unpolished levels onto compact discs and mailed them, alongside a detailed design document, to 20–30 publishers. Only two replied, both declining. The studio thus turned to licensing out its engine and releasing free demos of Serious Sam to garner publicity. Serious Engine cost between US$20,000 and $100,000 to license, significantly cheaper than the Quake III engine available at the time. Among fourteen licensees were a follow-up to Battlecruiser 3000AD codenamed Project ABC by Derek Smart, Alpha Black Zero: Intrepid Protocol by Khaeon, Nitro Family by Delphieye Entertainment, and Carnivores: Cityscape by Sunstorm Interactive. For the demo, Croteam created a vertical slice by taking the "Karnak" level, previously split in two due to hardware limitations, and thoroughly polishing it to make it feel complete. Entitled "Test 1", the demo was released on 30 May 2000 via Croteam's website and several mirror sites. At this time, Croteam comprised nine developers, of which six people were working full time and two students worked in their spare time, while one person had been conscripted. Some developers had left the studio before this point as they did not receive wages. One year of military service was compulsory in Croatia at the time, and all developers were conscripted at some point. Some full-time staffers worked on the game seven days per week. Lacking spare time, they did not get to work other jobs, go on dates, or play other games. At the office, they only played Serious Sam. The team ultimately grew to ten people.

According to Erik Wolpaw of the website Old Man Murray, the demo's release received no coverage from the video game press, even after he was the first to break the story with a short news piece, which led him to conduct and publish an interview with Ribarić. Additionally, the site featured a humorous review model that rated games by the time it takes from starting the game to finding a destructible crate. Unlike most games the site reviewed, the Serious Sam demo features no crates, earning it a rare positive review. According to Hunski, the team had forgotten to include crates and had not left them out deliberately. The coverage from Old Man Murray increased the game's popularity and the demo was downloaded about 1 million times over the summer. CNET Gamecenter later named Test 1 the best download of that time span. As some players reported that the game was too difficult on its easiest setting, Croteam toned it down and added the even easier "Tourist" mode. The coverage and positive reception to the demo enabled Croteam to resume publishing negotiations. The studio was approached by some major publishers, including Gathering of Developers (a subsidiary of Take-Two Interactive), which had taken note of the demo. In July 2000, Croteam agreed to a publishing deal with On Deck Interactive, a division of Gathering of Developers run by Robert Westmoreland that released budget-priced games. The publisher initially expected the game to be released in February 2001. The success also led Croteam to lay aside all plans of handling Serious Sam solely as a marketing demonstration for Serious Engine. In retrospect, Ribarić said that, without the interview that led to the publishing deal, Croteam would not have survived.

=== Late development and release ===
In June 2000, Croteam opened a competition for fans to submit and vote on possible catchphrases for Sam, with the top ten to be included in the game. Several thousand submissions were made by July, and some people sent in recordings of their lines. Among the latter was John Dick, who at the time was doing voice work and performing as a disc jockey for a radio station in South Texas. Inspired by Jon St. John's work as Duke Nukem on Duke Nukem 3D, Dick wanted to get into voice acting, and he had learned of Serious Sam just after Wolpaw's interview. He sent Croteam a fan letter, expressing his interest in voicing the game's lead character, and later handed in a voice sample. His performance stood out to Croteam, and Mravunac said he experienced goosebumps. They signed Dick onto the project, making up most of his voice lines as the development progressed, and Mravunac pitch-shifted his voice down slightly to better suit the character. Dick eventually had the Serious Sam bomb logo tattooed on his shoulder. He said that "I'm a part of Sam so I decided to make Sam a part of me." Since he used tattoos to signify periods of change in his life, Serious Sam represented the beginning of his career in video games.

In later stages of development, Croteam reduced the number of levels from forty to fifteen. One sewer level was added, counter to Croteam's original intentions, to appease George Broussard, who had criticised the game for its lack of "dark, closed, impossible-to-see-anything, sewerish levels". They included Wolpaw as an Easter egg in the level "Hatshepsut", and Ribarić designed the secret level "Sacred Yards" to feature crates in reference to Old Man Murray's scoring system. The latter level also contains further secrets, including one that allows the player to pass the level without facing any enemies. This secret was not fully uncovered until 2015, when the player SolaisYosei was hired by Croteam and discussed the level with Ribarić. When a reworked, "better-looking" model for Sam replaced a placeholder quickly created by Tomislav Pongrac, the community reacted negatively to the new design. In response, the team reverted to the prototype and improved its geometry instead. The final boss, Ugh-Zan III, was modelled by lead artist Admir Elezović within three days to replace one he said was "designed totally wrong". In addition to Serious Modeler, the artists used Photoshop, Terragen, and LightWave 3D.

Croteam released a second demo, "Test 2", on 15 December 2000 to trial the new multiplayer component. The game was reported to be 80% complete in January 2001. On 5 March 2001, On Deck Interactive was shut down as Westmoreland had left the company to pursue other interests. All games that were to be released under that label, including Serious Sam, were moved over to Gathering of Developers. On the following day, Gathering of Developers announced that the game had gone gold. It was released on 21 March 2001 and distributed in the United States by the Take-Two subsidiary Jack of All Games. By this time, Serious Sam had obtained the subtitle "The First Encounter". To aid modding efforts, it includes Serious Editor and Serious Modeler, and Croteam released a software development kit shortly thereafter.

== Reception ==
Reception

Aggregate score
Aggregator	Score
Metacritic	87/100

Review scores
Publication	Score
AllGame	3.5/5
Computer Games Magazine	4/5
Eurogamer	9/10
GameRevolution	B+
GameSpot	8.9/10
GameSpy	84/100
GameZone	9.5/10
IGN	9/10
Next Generation	4/5
PC Gamer (US)	75%
PC PowerPlay	81%
PC Zone	81/100
The Electric Playground	80%
Voodoo Extreme	88%

Serious Sam: The First Encounter received "generally favorable reviews", according to the review aggregator website Metacritic, which calculated a weighted average rating of 87/100 based on thirty-one critic reviews. Several critics described the game as a return to older first-person shooters like Doom and Duke Nukem 3D as the genre had since become more story-focused, as in Half-Life. John Bye (Eurogamer), Dave Woods (PC Zone), and Chris Kramer (Daily Radar) likened the game's intensity to that of Doom and opined it exceeded that of Kiss: Psycho Circus: The Nightmare Child, which had been released the year prior with a similar approach to enemy wave design. GameSpy's Allen Eccles believed the game had more enemies than any other game and lauded the skill required to defeat them. Chris Gardiner, writing for Games Domain, similarly highlighted the challenge the game posed. Kevin Giacobbi of GameZone said the difficulty options were well-balanced for various player skill levels. In contrast, Woods felt harder modes were too difficult while the easier modes were not challenging enough.

James Cottee (PC PowerPlay) said the game became tiresome after several hours of play, while Shawn Sparks (GameRevolution) considered it repetitive after an adrenaline rush. Charles Herold similarly noted in The New York Times that, due to its simple gameplay, the game merely made battles more difficult, not more interesting. According to Brett Todd of Computer Games Magazine, making battles increasingly comprise more enemies only highlighted a repetitive formula. Conversely, Robert Howarth of Voodoo Extreme believed the game was challenging and enjoyable despite its repetition, while Bye, Greg Kasavin (GameSpot), and Tal Blevins (IGN) stated any repetitiveness was compensated for by the large arsenal and variety in encounters. Woods and Cottee bemoaned the game was too short. Gardiner criticised the puzzle sequences as too trivial. Serious Engine was commended for its ability to render large outdoor scenes, which Kasavin and Blevins felt suited the action-oriented gameplay well. Cottee and Blevins particularly commended the engine for displaying many enemies without noticeable performance issues. Gardiner deplored that several features of the engine had been scarcely used in the game.

Bye lauded the game's graphics, describing the environments as "more relaxing but equally impressive" when compared to the gameplay and a "perfect showcase" for the "incredibly detailed" textures. He said the bright colour scheme was a welcome change from the "traditional miserable looking gothic castles and rusty futuristic military bases" found in other first-person shooters of the time. He further highlighted the game's particle effects. In a similar fashion, Howarth called the visuals "simply spectacular", and Eccles lauded the graphics for helping immerse the player in the setting. According to him, "ancient Egypt never looked better". Kevin Rice from Next Generation labelled the graphics "pure eye candy" but lamented the lack of environment variety, as all levels are set in Egypt. However, Christopher Allen of AllGame, while admiring the visual effects, observed a stark contrast in quality between the scenery and enemies. Bye noted that the amount of detail on these models was surprising given the large number of enemies visible at a time. Blevins also faulted the quality of the models but believed they were aptly designed. Kramer praised the Beheaded Kamikaze as "perhaps one of the funniest, scariest enemies we've seen in recent memory".

Jeremy Williams of PC Gamer welcomed the inclusion of a cooperative mode, which he said had been lacking in previous games. Kasavin felt the multiplayer modes rivalled those of the most popular contemporary shooters. Leandro Asnaghi-Nicastro of The Electric Playground commended it for its speed and reliability, even on a slow internet connection. Woods faulted the multiplayer for having too few deathmatch levels as well as unbalanced weapon strengths, citing the Thompson submachine gun as "way too powerful". He concluded that the multiplayer was "a bonus and a harmless diversion, nothing more". Conversely, Eccles opined the multiplayer modes sharply increased the game's enjoyability. He further applauded the game's humour, as did Woods, while Bye said it was well-timed and apt for the game, save for some puns. Allen, on the other hand, felt none of the one-liners were as clever as those in Duke Nukem 3D. Kasavin and Bye lauded the sound effects, and Kasavin described the controls as responsive.

Costing $20 in the United States, many outlets recommended The First Encounter for its price–performance ratio. According to Kramer, "Serious Sam is not the best computer game we've ever played, but it is the best $20 computer game we've ever played." Rice exclaimed the game was "the best $20 you can spend". However, shortly after the game had received positive reviews, its list price in the United Kingdom was increased from £20 to £30, more than double the American price, which converted to approximately £14 at the time. PC Zone's deputy editor, Richie Shoemaker, believed this to be a dangerous precedent of price increases for games based on positive reception. Bye considered it extortion. In the United States, the game attained a "Mature 17+" rating by the Entertainment Software Rating Board, which Steve Alexander of the Star Tribune found questionable when comparing it to other contemporary media like horror films or games such as Conker's Bad Fur Day. The First Encounter sold 83,000 copies in the country by October 2001, according to NPD Intelect.

=== Accolades ===
GameSpot named The First Encounter the game of the year for PCs. Additionally, the site nominated it for "Best Graphics, Technical", "Best Single-Player Action Game", and "Best Multiplayer Action Game". The Electric Playground awarded it the title "Best Independent PC Game", alongside nominations for "Best Graphics in a PC Game", "Best Action Game for PC", and "Best Shooter for PC", at its Blister Awards 2001. IGN's 2001 Action Vault Awards recognised the game in the "Outstanding Achievement in Technology" and "Surprise of the Year" categories. For GameSpy, it was the "Best Value Priced Game" and had the "Best End Boss". At Eurogamer's 2002 Gaming Globe Awards, the game was nominated in the "Art Direction" and "Sound" categories. The First Encounter was used for benchmarks of graphics cards, audio systems, and computer mice.

== Legacy ==
=== Ports and sequels ===
InterActive Vision's Poland-based Mind Beacon studio, under the direction of Piotr Kulik, developed a version of Serious Sam: The First Encounter for Palm OS devices. The development was finished by November 2001 and the Take-Two subsidiary Global Star Software released the game in early December. Two demos, one in colour and one in black and white, were released in January 2002. The game is compatible with Palm OS version 3.5 and higher.

Immediately following The First Encounter's completion, Croteam began work on a sequel based on an updated version of Serious Engine. The game moved away from the Egyptian theme and was announced as Serious Sam: The Second Encounter in September 2001. Initially slated for December 2001, it was released in February 2002. An Xbox compilation that bundles The First Encounter and The Second Encounter was in development by January 2002, with Serious Engine already adapted for the platform. At the time, Croteam was negotiating with Take-Two to have the compilation released by the end of the year. In July 2002, Take-Two established the label Gotham Games, with Serious Sam for the Xbox to be among its first products. The compilation features thirty-five levels and improved graphical elements like reworked weapon models. Additionally, it amends the points system to have the player earn lives as well as higher scores through combos. It was released on 12 November 2002. On Windows, the compilation was released as Serious Sam: Gold Edition in 2003 with an additional episode made by the modder Trisk.

Serious Sam II, described as a "true sequel" to The First Encounter and The Second Encounter, was announced in September 2002 and released in October 2005. Serious Sam 3: BFE became a prequel to The First Encounter. Croteam's vertical slice model shaped how it approached early consumer testing for its later games, including Serious Sam 3: BFE and The Talos Principle.

=== Remake ===
In June 2009, the publisher Majesco announced a high-definition remake, Serious Sam HD: The First Encounter, for Windows and the Xbox 360. For this remake, Croteam worked with the nascent publisher Devolver Digital, founded by the Gathering of Developers co-founders Mike Wilson and Harry Miller. As Devolver Digital had not been licensed as a publisher for the Xbox 360 yet, it published the Windows version and worked with Majesco on the Xbox 360 release. Due to budget constraints, Croteam skipped the development of a PlayStation 3 version to first gauge public interest. Serious Sam HD: The First Encounter was released for Windows on 24 November 2009, while the Xbox 360 version was scheduled for December. Shortly thereafter, Devolver Digital announced a remake of The Second Encounter. The Xbox 360 port was released on 13 January 2010 via Xbox Live Arcade and became the service's most-played game that month with 35,211 players. A March 2010 patch added a multiplayer deathmatch mode.

The First Encounter, The Second Encounter, and their remakes were bundled on Steam as Serious Sam HD: Gold Edition from September 2010. They were distributed physically for the Xbox 360 with The Serious Sam Collection, released by Mastertronic Group in July 2013. Serious Sam HD: The First Encounter, Serious Sam HD: The Second Encounter, and Serious Sam 3: BFE became part of Serious Sam Collection, which was released for the Stadia streaming service on 3 March 2020. Serious Sam Collection was brought to the Nintendo Switch, PlayStation 4, and Xbox One on 17 November 2020.

Around 2016, a small team within Croteam began developing a virtual reality version of the remake based on its prior work on Serious Sam VR: The Last Hope. Called Serious Sam VR: The First Encounter, it incorporates locomotion and teleportation movement, as well as dual wielding for all weapons. It was made available as an early access title for Windows in December 2016, with a Linux version added in February 2017. The finished game was released on 30 March 2017. Both versions of the remake are part of the Serious Sam Fusion 2017 game hub.

=== Fan projects ===
Croteam sanctioned the development of Serious Sam Origins, a mod developed by users of the Russian fansite SeriousSite.ru that completes the levels cut from The First Encounter. Croteam provided the development team with a build of the game from 2000, which they intended to extend into a campaign that culminates in Sam defeating Mental. The project was announced in October 2013. The fan collective Alligator Pit developed Serious Sam Classics: Revolution, an updated compilation of The First Encounter and The Second Encounter with additional content, under the oversight of Croteam. Both projects were expected to be released between the PlayStation 3 version of Serious Sam 3: BFE in 2014 and Serious Sam 4. Devolver Digital released Serious Sam Classics: Revolution into Steam Early Access in April 2014 but its development halted after late 2016 when the members of Alligator Pit became preoccupied with other matters. Croteam eventually took over the development and released the game in August 2019, giving it for free to existing owners of the original games on Steam.

During The First Encounter's fifteenth anniversary in March 2016, Croteam released the source code of Serious Engine version 1.10 as open-source software. Ryan C. Gordon ported it to Linux and macOS in April 2016. Based on the open-source engine, Sultim Tsyrendashiev developed a version of The First Encounter with real-time path tracing and a renderer for the Vulkan graphics API.
