= Le Serpent Rouge puzzle =

Puzzle from video game Gabriel Knight 3: Blood of the Sacred, Blood of the Damned

Le Serpent Rouge puzzle is a puzzle found in the video game Gabriel Knight 3: Blood of the Sacred, Blood of the Damned. It is a puzzle which surrounds a document of the same name, where protagonist Grace Nakimura attempts to decipher riddles found in 13 different passages of the document. The puzzle was created by Jane Jensen, who also designed the game, and was inspired by the real-world poem of the same name, although she modified parts of it to make it solvable for players. Jensen was inspired in part by the works of author David Wood as well as the book The Tomb of God. The new fully controllable 3D camera was also a factor that went into the puzzle's design.

The puzzle has been received generally positively, with adventure game fans regarding it as one of the best puzzles ever made. Critics from Adventure Gamers identified it as a highlight of Gabriel Knight 3, while Just Adventure and Adventure Gamers considered it one of the best of all time, the latter offering particular praise to the execution of its "over-arching nature".

== Puzzle and solution ==
The Le Serpent Rouge puzzle is present in the video game Gabriel Knight 3: Blood of the Sacred, Blood of the Damned. It refers to a document found in the game, containing hints as to how to find the treasure of Rennes-le-Chateau. The document contains 14 segments: 13 that take from the zodiac symbols, and one extra. One of the game's characters, Grace Nakimura, first learns of the document from a conversation with two others, Estelle Stiles and Lily Howard. Nakimura is told at different times that the document was either deposited at the French national library and has since gone missing, or that it never existed in the first place. She later discovers an envelope taped to a museum door, which turns out to contain the document. The document contains multiple riddles, and Nakimura is tasked with solving them. Each passage contains a poem, and each poem contains secrets in Saint-Sulpice. As Nakimura discovers more information, she finds more layers to the poems, which then reveals new images, text, and clues for players to utilize as part of the puzzle. Players use a computer designed by Nakimura called SIDNEY to analyze the diagrams and maps, translate text, and perform "cryptographic and anagrammatic" functions.

== Concept and creation ==
The Le Serpent Rouge puzzle was created by Jane Jensen for the video game Gabriel Knight 3. Jensen identified it as the most challenging puzzle she ever designed, discussing how she used a "real-life" solution to the "Rennes-le-Chateau mystery". She modified the real poem of the same name and changed a fair amount of the poem to make it a solvable puzzle. The idea of the circle, square, and grid used in the puzzle was inspired by books written by author David Wood, and the location of the final treasure was inspired by the book The Tomb of God. She notes that most of the puzzle's elements she had to come up with herself. She also called it her favorite puzzle of all time, and part of the reason she is fond of Gabriel Knight 3. She built the puzzle around the game's fully controllable 3D camera, which was a new feature to the series, with the intention of utilizing the camera to its fullest extent. She discussed how it was fun to design puzzles that required three dimensions. Jensen discussed doing puzzles similar to Le Serpent Rouge for a series of adventure games under the label Gray Matter, but split up into "smaller chunks".

== Reception ==
The Le Serpent Rouge puzzle has received generally positive reception, identified as both a "renowned" and "revered" puzzle by Incubator Games CEO Radek Koncewicz and writer Jack Allin, respectively. It is regarded by adventure game fans as one of the greatest puzzles ever created. In their review of Gabriel Knight 3, Adventure Gamers writer Dan Ravipinto identified the puzzle as one of the best aspects of the game. Just Adventure staff regarded the puzzle as one of his "all-time favorites". Adventure Gamers staff praised the puzzle as being "perhaps the best over-arching puzzles ever" in an adventure game. Writer Evans Dickens found one series of puzzles in the video game The Uncertainty Machine to be inspired by the Le Serpent Rouge puzzle. Writer Johann Walter compared the video game Destination: Treasure Island to the puzzle, stating that people who enjoyed the puzzle may be happy with the game. The Games Machine staff stated that while it was long and demanding, players would be left satisfied once they completed the puzzle. Computer Gaming World staff felt that people more invested in the mystery will appreciate the puzzle, though felt it would still be intriguing for those who are not as much.

Hardcore Gaming 101 writer Kurt Kalata felt that it could be either "intriguing" or "tedious" depending on how much a person enjoys "rote detective work", though he noted that it was better than the "click-happy chapters" from its predecessor. Writer Andrea Morstabilini felt somewhat put off by Kalata's book on adventure games due to his criticisms of the puzzle, describing it as "one of the most fascinating and complex puzzles" featured in an adventure game.

== See also ==
- Cat hair mustache puzzle – an infamous puzzle from the same game.
- Dossiers Secrets d'Henri Lobineau
