= Alca =

Alca may refer to:

- Alca, one of the districts of the province La Unión in the Arequipa region, Peru
- Advanced Light Combat Aircraft; see Aero L-159 Alca
- Alca, a genus of birds
- Apostolic Lutheran Church of America
- Alca Electronics, a UK manufacturer of video games
- The Free Trade Area of the Americas, known as Área de Libre Comercio de las Américas in Spanish, and Área de Livre Comércio das Américas in Portuguese
- The Professional Landcare Network, previously known as the Associated Landscape Contractors of America
