= Cue Club =

Series of video games developed by Bulldog Interactive

- Cover design for Cue Club
- Developer(s): Bulldog Interactive
- Publisher(s): Bulldog Interactive
- Platform(s): Microsoft Windows
- Genre(s): Sports simulation

Cue Club, is a sports simulation video game series developed by Bulldog Interactive. The games in the series focus on delivering a realistic interpretation of pool and snooker. The original title was released on Microsoft Windows on 10 November 2000, with a sequel entitled Cue Club 2 arriving on 4 July 2014, on the same platform. The first game was initially published by Midas Interactive. Both editions are now distributed exclusively by Bulldog through the official Cue Club website, with the sequel also being available on Steam.

== Cue Club ==
Demonstrating a swerve shot in 8-ball pool, practice mode

Cue Club uses a fixed, overhead view of the table, with the user's mouse serving as a controller.

The game features a tournament mode, practice mode, quick game, two-player head-to-head, and a bonus 'slam' mode where the balls can be hurled around with the mouse. Different rules are available including eight-ball, nine-ball, speed pool, killer and snooker, with an option to play snooker with either fifteen or ten reds. It's possible to customize the rules for eight-ball to replicate the game's many variants, with further custom rules for killer pool. A large selection of table designs, ball sets and cues are provided, with settings for fast and slow cloth speeds, and different methods to cue.

The game also features a series of themed 'Virtual Chat Rooms' that the player is free to explore, subject to certain conditions. For example, access may be restricted due to overcrowding, or male players may be turned away if it is already occupied by too many men.

Gameplay in snooker mode

Once inside, players interact by sending chat messages and requesting games through a dialogue box. Often the conversation contains banter and joking. If a match is agreed upon, the challengers go off to play. Winners are rewarded with an increase in reputation, allowing them to play higher-ranked opponents and progress through the game's various levels. A loss usually involves a reduction in reputation, making it more difficult to get matches in the future, forcing the player to challenge lower-ranked opponents. When the player attains the maximum 5-star reputation, the 'boss' of the chat room will usually agree to play. By defeating the boss, the player's membership to that room is upgraded from standard to silver, entitling them to certain privileges.

In tournament mode players compete for the eight trophies on offer (one for each chat room). When all eight trophies have been won, the player then competes for the ultimate prize of the Grand Cue Club Trophy, which is the hardest tournament and features all of the bosses. After all of the 'boss' characters have been individually defeated and the Cue Club Tournament has been won, the game is officially completed and an end-game sequence is played. As a further bonus, the winner is awarded a 'gold-card' membership to the chat rooms, which guarantees access and preserves the player's 5-star reputation.

== Critical response ==
Reviews from the gaming press were favourable. Despite embracing a simple top-down view of the table, reviewers often cited the game's accurate physics engine, realistic graphics and high degree of playability as its key strengths. PC Gamer magazine were less impressed, scoring it at 60%, saying, "Despite its other graphical jiggling and poking, that fixed, flat view makes it feel like an 'Internet game'." They did give credit to Bulldog Interactive for the efforts that they put into the game's physics but said that other similar games "are more likely to make you want to put your coins on the table."

== Cue Club 2 ==
3D Snooker mode in Cue Club 2

Cue Club 2 expands significantly upon the original game, and has received continual updates since launch, including an online multiplayer mode, the addition of a first-person camera with 3-dimensional (3D) tables and bars, a wide selection of larger table sizes, and an expanded range of achievements.

Cue Club 2 can be played in either top-down view (2D mode) or a first-person view (3D mode). Game control options include mouse and keyboard, game-pad or touchscreen device. Several game types are available including eight-ball (including both US and European Blackball rules), nine-ball, ten-ball, six-ball, seven-ball, straight pool, snooker, speed pool, and killer. Rules are closely aligned with competition play, however the rules of all pool modalities and snooker can be customised to reflect the many variants in use around the world. There are three variations of snooker: a full game with fifteen reds, and shorter games with either ten or six reds. Players choose from a selection of game modes including Practice, Single Player Quick Game, 2-4 Player, Tournament, Bar Challenge and an online Multiplayer mode.

The game is set in a fictional club featuring a range of themed bars and theatre venues, and each is host to a selection of unique opponents of varying difficulty. Upon starting the game for the first time the player is required to sign in by entering their name, after which they are given a membership card to access the Basement Bar.

There are two main parts to the game. The first is to complete the Bar Challenge, where the player chooses the game rules in each match and aims to progress through the stages by beating computer-controlled opponents one by one. There are fifteen characters in total, complete with imagery, and dressed in casual clothing. After defeating all the opponents in a bar, the player is awarded a membership card to the next bar where the difficulty level increases. When all the bars have been unlocked and the opponents defeated, the player is presented with the Bar Challenge trophy.

The second part to Cue Club 2 is the tournament mode. Sixteen players compete in a tournament, and for this game mode opponents are dressed in formal competition attire. Progress is initially straightforward, but gets harder as weaker players are eliminated and more skilful opponents are encountered. There are four rounds in total (first round, quarter-final, semi-final and final), and the number of frames played can be set anywhere from Best of 3 up to Best of 35. Since matches can potentially take a long time to complete, games may be saved at any point and resumed later using one of the numerous save-game slots. If the player succeeds in winning a tournament they are awarded a trophy, with trophies for each of the ten variations of pool and snooker available.

Other accolades can be gained for achieving high snooker breaks, including a century break and the elusive 147 maximum. Additional trophies are awarded for fast clearance times in speed pool, high runs in straight pool, and also for accumulating points in multiplayer earned by winning matches. In total, there are seventy trophies to collect, which includes individual colour-coded Bar Challenge and tournament trophies for each of the five difficulty settings. Leader-boards and statistics screens record performances and totals for snooker breaks, speed pool times and straight pool runs.

The game is officially completed when all of the above achievements have been earned, filling the slots on the trophy table. Upon successful completion of the Bar Challenge, which is arguably the largest and most challenging aspect of the game, a victory sequence is played.
