= Old Man Murray =

Computer game commentary and reviews website

- Available in: English
- Owner: UGO Networks
- Creators: Chet Faliszek and Erik Wolpaw
- Website: oldmanmurray.com
- Current status: No longer updated

Old Man Murray (OMM) is a UGO Networks computer game commentary and reviews site, known for its highly irreverent and satiric tone. Founded in 1997, it was written and edited by Chet Faliszek and Erik Wolpaw. Old Man Murray was critical of games that received strong reviews elsewhere. Common targets of OMM news updates included John Romero and American McGee.

Old Man Murray was a significant early influence in both the world of game development and internet comedy, and is often considered to have "helped birth online games journalism".

== Themes ==
Old Man Murray often took aim at the conventions embedded within game genres. A major theme in Old Man Murray criticism was the accusation that many new games failed to add any original ideas to the medium.

Other features of Old Man Murray included web browser games such as Alien vs. Child Predator and Virtua Seaman as well as serious interviews with leading game developers. The Old Man Murray forums were a hotbed of discussion on games and other topics. When updates began to slow on the main website the forums remained active. When Faliszek removed the forums, many of the regular posters migrated to a new site called Caltrops.

Two of the site's attacks on stale game conventions have received particular attention from game developers and journalists.

=== "Crate Review System" ===
The April 2000 "Crate Review System" essay half-seriously introduced the "Start to Crate" metric as an "objective" measure of the overall quality of a video game. The Start to Crate was the number of seconds from the start of a game until the player first encountered a crate or barrel. By 2000, crates and barrels were commonplace in video game map design; according to the essay, the first crate "represents the point where the developers ran out of ideas".

This essay has had a significant impact in future game design, in part for pointing out "a good gauge to determine just how creative your game is", and driving designers to a point where games are "at the stage where warehouse based level design is not de rigueur". Gabe Newell of Valve Corporation mentioned that during the development of Half-Life 2 there was such a worry about the crate cliché that eventually the team gave up and made a crate one of the first things the player sees and manipulates, figuring that this "was the Old Man Murray equivalent of throwing yourself to the mercy of the court." LightBox Interactive's Matthew Breit considered the "Start to Crate Time" system the "first actual critical look at a level design trend", making him self-conscious of the off-handed use of crates in his level designs to fill an otherwise empty room. Gamasutra author Ernest Adams cited the article in a collection of "bad game designer" criticisms: "I can't claim crates without pallets as an original [criticism] because the Old Man Murray guys thought of it first...". A decade after the article's publication, it could still be found as a tongue-in-cheek metric for game quality.

=== "Death of Adventure Games" ===
Another essay, "The Death of Adventure Games", mocked the elaborate and contrived puzzles that adventure games of the time used to confound the player. Written in response to a Gamecenter article that posited casual gamers' preference for flashier and less-complex titles like Myst had led to a decline in the adventure game genre, Wolpaw instead opined that the genre's downfall was self-inflicted by the nonsensical complexity and low quality of the puzzles the games offered.

Wolpaw uses an example from Gabriel Knight 3: the game requires the player to make his character fashion a false mustache from hair collected from a cat by means of sticky tape and to attach it to his lip with maple syrup — all to impersonate a man who himself has no mustache. The essay and its examples have been highlighted in analyses of the failing adventure game genre in the early 2000s.

== Legacy ==
The Old Man Murray website is still online as of 2024, but for archival purposes only; the site has not been updated since 2002. Though the site has been defunct for decades, many leaders in the video game industry consider the site fundamental to both game design and video game journalism today. In March 2011, Rock Paper Shotgun's John Walker asked games industry figures for commentary of the site's legacy after he found the website's Wikipedia article was nominated for deletion. Bryan Lee O'Malley, creator of the Scott Pilgrim series, attributes his inspiration and success of the series on the Old Man Murray's comedic treatment of video games. Both Mike Wilson of Gathering of Developers and Roman Ribarić of Croteam believed that without the strong interest from Old Man Murray toward the Serious Sam demo, ultimately leading to the founding of Croteam, the game "would likely have died in the hands of whatever internal team the property was handed to". Popular video game critic and satirist Ben "Yahtzee" Croshaw cites Old Man Murray as a major influence for his style of highly nitpicky writing and humor and has consistently praised games that Faliszek and Wolpaw worked on.

Eric Church of Electronic Arts also called these criticisms "satire at its most effective", as it spurred "serious thought and discussions about the assumptions of game design". Dean O'Donnell, a professor at Worcester Polytechnic Institute's Interactive Media and Game Design school, includes the "Death of Adventure Games" as required reading in the student courses, considered it both a strong example of game journalism and game design considerations. Kieron Gillen, former deputy editor at PC Gamer, praised Old Man Murray for taking advantage of the nascent internet culture in their writing and presentation, and attested that "they had a genuine impact in how people thought about games". It has also been cited as being "among the most respected commentators and journalists." On the other hand, John Adkins of Mic wrote that Old Man Murray's mordant tone and sometimes deliberately offensive humor contributed to toxic elements of internet and gamer culture, such as Gamergate.

In March 2006, Wolpaw won a Game Developers Choice Award for Best Writing for co-writing Psychonauts, an award he shared with Double Fine studio head and Psychonauts co-writer Tim Schafer. Schafer referenced Wolpaw's work with Old Man Murray on the official Double Fine blog, as a way of drumming up attention for the game.

Gabe Newell, CEO of video game developer Valve Corporation, had cited the opinions of Old Man Murray as a factor when designing Half-Life and Half-Life 2, later likening the site to "the Velvet Underground of post-print journalism". Faliszek and Wolpaw were hired as writers for Valve in 2005. Faliszek has spoken numerous times about his work as a designer for Left 4 Dead, while Wolpaw has done the same for both Portal and Portal 2. The connection between the quality of writing in these games and the authors' previous work on Old Man Murray has also been noted by various reviewers.

== Appearances in other media ==
- On the Quake III Arena map Q3DM19, the OMM logo is on the back of the antenna lift.
- The Old Man Murray website appears on all the monitors within the game Postal 2.
- Old Man Murray is thanked in the first level of Serious Sam by avatars of the game's programmers. Old Man Murray had been one of the game's few media champions during its development cycle, thanks to its uncomplicated, Smash TV-esque gameplay.
- Delarion Yar, of the XYZZY Award-winning graphical text adventure Fallacy of Dawn is depicted throughout wearing an Old Man Murray shirt.
- In the game Oni, the first crate seen in the Warehouse bears a label saying "-OMM- TTC 1.1", a reference to the site's tongue-in-cheek Crate Review System.
- Old Man Murray is referenced on multiple occasions by various authors on the humour web site Something Awful, with which it shares some aspects of its humour. Among the frequent references is the quote "If anything this has been the worst year for gaming journalism since Old Man Murray stopped updating roughly three weeks after they started the site."
