= Tower of Souls =

1995 video game

- Amiga cover art
- Developer: Parys Technografx
- Publisher: Black Legend
- Platforms: Amiga, MS-DOS, iOS, Windows Mobile
- Release: 1995
- Genre: Role-playing

Tower of Souls is an isometric role-playing video game developed by British studio Parys Technografx and published in 1995 by for Black Legend for Amiga and MS-DOS. It was later converted to iOS and Windows Mobile.

== Reception ==
Amiga Format gave a scathing review, describing it as "the most tediously clichéd tale of wretchedness". CU Amiga said that the gameplay was not praiseworthy. Amiga Joker offered praise for the beautiful aesthetics of the game.

British gaming magazine The One gave the Amiga version of Tower of Souls an overall score of 85%, stating: "It's difficult, if not impossible, to innovate in some genres of game ... However, Legend proved me wrong, and now Tower of Souls has taken the concept of Legend and applied a crackingly-good control system." The One praised the isometric perspective, but expressed that "it's difficult to judge the exact position of enemies. And something which looks like it's going to miss you often hits ... and with only one life, that's harsh."
