= Tomb Raider: Anniversary =

2007 video game

- Developers: Crystal Dynamics; Buzz Monkey Software (Note: Ported to Microsoft Windows by Nixxes Software, OS X by Feral Interactive and Robosoft Technologies, and mobile by FinBlade)
- Publisher: Eidos Interactive (Note: OS X port published by Feral Interactive, PlayStation 3 version published by Square Enix Europe)
- Director: Jason Botta
- Producer: Lulu LaMer
- Designers: Jason Botta; Riley Cooper
- Programmers: Ergin Dervisoglu; Tom Fong
- Artist: Andrew Wood
- Writers: Toby Gard; Matt Ragghianti
- Composer: Troels Brun Folmann
- Series: Tomb Raider
- Platforms: Microsoft Windows; PlayStation 2; PlayStation Portable; Xbox 360; Wii; Mobile; OS X; PlayStation 3
- Release: 1 June 2007: Microsoft Windows, PlayStation 2; EU: 1 June 2007; NA: 5 June 2007; AU: 7 June 2007 PlayStation Portable; NA: 9 August 2007; EU: 26 October 2007; AU: 2 November 2007 Xbox 360; NA: 23 October 2007; EU: 26 October 2007; AU: 2 November 2007 Wii; NA: 13 November 2007; EU: 7 December 2007; AU: 7 February 2008 MOBI December 2007 OS X 15 February 2008 PlayStation 3; NA: 22 March 2011; EU: 25 March 2011; AU: 31 March 2011
- Genre: Action-adventure
- Mode: Single-player

Tomb Raider: Anniversary is a 2007 action-adventure video game developed by Crystal Dynamics and Buzz Monkey Software and published by Eidos Interactive in 2007 for Microsoft Windows, PlayStation 2, Xbox 360, PlayStation Portable, Wii and mobile phones. It was later ported to OS X in 2008 and PlayStation 3 in 2011. The eighth overall entry in the Tomb Raider series and second in the Legend trilogy, Anniversary is a remake of the first Tomb Raider game, originally released in 1996.

Taking place before the events of 2006's Tomb Raider: Legend, Anniversary follows series protagonist Lara Croft's quest for the Scion of Atlantis. Gameplay features Lara navigating linear levels, fighting enemies and solving puzzles to progress. The Wii version includes console-exclusive motion control elements, and the mobile adaptation features side-scrolling gameplay emulating earlier mobile Tomb Raider titles.

Following the completion of Legend, Crystal Dynamics began developing Anniversary. Using the Legend engine, the team rebuilt the gameplay and levels, and series cocreator Toby Gard expanded the narrative. Composer Troels Brun Folmann remade and added to the music using an orchestral style. A remake of the original Tomb Raider was initially being created by franchise creators Core Design, but the project was cancelled following their sale to Rebellion Developments in 2006.

Upon release, Anniversary received generally positive reviews from critics, who deemed it a worthy remake of the original game, though some criticism was aimed at the game's graphics and occasional technical issues. The Wii version also divided opinion, with some critics praising the implementation of motion controls but others faulting them. While it reached high positions in sales charts, the game would become the worst selling entry in the franchise, selling just 1.3 million copies worldwide. The game was followed by Tomb Raider: Underworld (2008), the last in the Legend trilogy that takes place directly after the events of Legend.

== Gameplay ==
In the opening area of the first level, Lara jumps to a switch.

Tomb Raider: Anniversary is a single-player action-adventure game where the player controls the protagonist, Lara Croft, from a third-person perspective, through fourteen levels set across four locations around the world. Lara can jump, climb and shimmy along ledges and vertical poles or ladders, crawl through small spaces, and swing on ropes and horizontal poles. Other abilities include interacting with objects and switches, using a grappling hook to latch onto special rings for both puzzle solving and environmental traversal, and swim and dive underwater for a limited time. Different button combinations can create more moves such as a roll and swan dive.

Puzzles block progress through the levels until Lara solves them by activating switches or finding and using keys hidden within the area. These involve avoiding traps and timed environmental elements. In some sections, the player must pass quick time events by reacting to control prompts that appear on screen. While exploring, Lara can find large and small Medipacks that can heal damage suffered during gameplay, items which allow progress through a level or the larger game, and hidden artefacts and relics which unlock rewards such as costumes once collected. Once completed, a time trial is unlocked for each level, with further bonus features unlocking once the time trial is completed successfully.

During combat, Lara automatically locks on to enemies and fires with her equipped gun, with the player able to switch to another target within range and move freely to avoid enemy attacks. Animal enemies can grab and knock Lara down, leaving her vulnerable to damage until she breaks free or rights herself from a fall. Tougher enemies become enraged and charge at Lara after being shot a number of times. When they close in, time slows and Lara can dodge the incoming attack, allowing her time to counterattack. A special attack triggered during this time is a head shot when two targeting reticles overlap; a head shot kills a standard enemy and deals high damage to boss characters. Lara has access to four different weapons in combat; her default twin pistols with infinite ammunition, and three secondary weapons—a shotgun, dual .50 caliber handguns and dual miniature submachine guns—with different attack power and limited ammunition which is picked up during levels. Should Lara die during gameplay, she restarts from the previous checkpoint.

The Wii port carries over the levels and general gameplay of the other versions, while incorporating motion controls. Wii-exclusive first-person puzzles include breaking through walls with a pickaxe, using a flash light in dark areas, assembling mechanisms from pieces found around the environment, manipulating symbol-based locks, and using paper and charcoal to take rubbings of puzzle-related symbols, all utilizing the Wii Remote. Motion controls are also used for some aspects of platforming, and free aiming in combat. In the mobile phone version of Anniversary, Lara navigates side-scrolling 2D levels, platforming, fighting enemies and activating switches to progress.

== Plot ==
British archaeologist-adventurer Lara Croft is approached by mercenary Larson, who is employed by wealthy businesswoman Jacqueline Natla. Natla hires Lara to find the Scion of Atlantis, an ancient artefact originally sought by Lara's father Richard Croft. It is buried in the tomb of Atlantean ruler Qualopec within the lost city of Vilcabamba. Making her way through Vilcabamba to Qualopec's tomb, Lara discovers that there are three pieces of the Scion, divided between Atlantis' Triumvirate. Escaping the tomb, she is confronted by Larson, sent by Natla to take Lara's piece of the Scion. After beating him in a fight, he reveals that Natla has sent her rival Pierre Dupont to retrieve the next piece. Breaking into Natla's offices, Lara discovers a video showing the next Scion piece's resting place in Greece beneath a building called St Francis' Folly.

Navigating the catacombs beneath St Francis' Folly, Lara finds the tomb of Tihocan, another member of the Triumvirate, that led the survivors of Atlantis after a betrayal caused the city's destruction. Pierre steals the Scion piece, but he is killed by guardian centaurs outside the tomb. After defeating the centaurs and joining both pieces of the Scion, Lara has a vision which reveals that the third and final piece of the Scion was hidden in Egypt after the third member of the Triumvirate—the traitor who sank Atlantis—was captured by Tihocan and Qualopec. Recovering the third Scion piece, Lara assembles the Scion and sees the rest of the vision, revealing Natla to be the betrayer. Emerging from her vision, Lara is ambushed by Natla, who takes the Scion.

Lara escapes Natla's henchmen—with silent help from Larson—and stows away aboard Natla's boat, which arrives at an uncharted volcanic island holding an Atlantean pyramid filled with her monstrous creations. Lara is forced to kill Larson when he will not back down, which greatly disturbs her. Fighting Natla's remaining henchmen and navigating the pyramid−including an encounter with a doppelgänger of her−Lara confronts Natla, who offers her a place in the new Triumvirate and access to the Scion's knowledge to complete Richard's quest for knowledge. Lara instead shoots the Scion and sends Natla plummeting into a pool of lava, triggering a chain reaction that begins destroying the pyramid. After a final confrontation with a severely injured but still powerful Natla, ending after she is crushed by a pillar, Lara escapes the island and sails away in Natla's boat.

== Development ==
Tomb Raider is the first game in the titular franchise, and introduced the series' gameplay standards and its protagonist Lara Croft. Developed by British studio Core Design and released in 1996, Tomb Raider was a commercial and critical success. It was followed by four successive games between 1997 and 2000. Their sixth Tomb Raider game Tomb Raider: The Angel of Darkness was beset by developmental problems and rushed to release, resulting in low sales and largely negative critical reception. The game's failure and Core Design's fatigue with the series prompted franchise publisher Eidos Interactive to move development of Tomb Raider to the American studio Crystal Dynamics, who rebooted the franchise with Tomb Raider: Legend. Legend was released in 2006 to critical and commercial success. Following the success of Legend, Crystal Dynamics were requested by Eidos to develop a remake of the original Tomb Raider. Anniversary was co-developed by Crystal Dynamics and Buzz Monkey Software, the company responsible for Legend's PSP port. The game's creative director and lead designer was James Botta, its producer was Lulu LaMer, and its art director was Andrew Wood.

The team were eager to develop Anniversary as they could use the development assets of Legend. They were also shocked by the request due to the original game's status amongst both Tomb Raider fans and video game history. Another reason for developing Anniversary over a new game was to help celebrate the series' tenth anniversary and create a "compelling gameplay experience" by remaking the first game rather than creating a new title. With two studios working on the game, the development structure was quite complex; a core team of fifteen was based at Crystal Dynamics, Buzz Monkey Software formed a large part of the game's staff, and Crystal Dynamic's executive Creative Services section oversaw development. When designing Anniversary, the team emphasised creating the game first before making adjustments to keep paper documentation to a minimum in favour of face-to-face conversations. To facilitate a smooth process, the team created a merit-based "democratic" environment where ideas could be put forward by other team members.

=== Story and art design ===
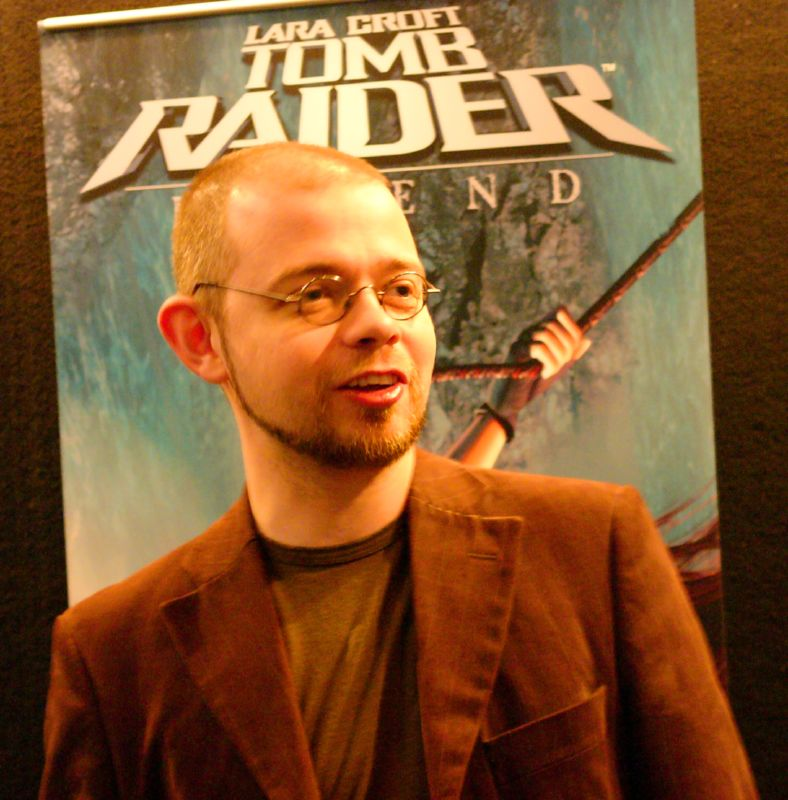
Toby Gard (pictured 2006), a key figure for the series and credited creator of Lara Croft, was one of the story designers for Anniversary.

Toby Gard, one of the original game's designers and Lara's credited creator, acted as story designer; the script and dialogue were written by Matt Ragghianti. The original game's story was described by Crystal Dynamics staff as "pretty sparse" and difficult to understand without Gard's explanations. One of the aims with Anniversary was to flesh out the narrative and tie it into the continuity of Legend. Gard fleshed out the lore and character motivations in Anniversary, something impossible with Tomb Raider as it needed to tell its story as quickly as possible. The narrative's conclusion, which included Lara's temptation by Natla's offer of the knowledge her father sought, thematically led into Lara's search for her mother in Legend.

Keeley Hawes, Lara's voice actress in Legend, reprised her role for Anniversary. Lara's personality was modelled upon that shown in Legend, but with suitable adjustments for who she was as a person during the events of Anniversary. Lara's initial drive for adventure—defined by Gard as an unstoppable "madness" contained within a proper British woman—was fleshed out to provide purpose for players. The aim was to make her appealing while staying true to her original portrayal. Gard's expansion of the story became focused on how far Lara was willing to go and what moral boundaries she would cross in pursuit of her goals. The interactions of Natla, Larson and Pierre were extensively expanded by Gard, beginning with an infiltration sequence of Natla's Los Angeles offices by Lara prior to the Greece levels, which in Anniversary had her watching video messages between the characters. The character of Larson, who was carried over from the first game and merged with another of Natla's original henchman called Cowboy, was made a more ambiguous character who shared a "chemistry" with Lara. The moment where Lara kills Larson was written to show Lara crossing a moral line and killing a person for the first time in pursuit of her goals. Natla's other henchmen were also reimagined to be more realistic, with Lara's confrontation with them being an intense battle following the emotional scene with Larson.

As described by art director Andrew Wood, one of the team's starting points was taking the most memorable moments from Tomb Raider and recreating them in Anniversary on a grander and more detailed scale. The art team wanted to show respect for the original game, designing environments to evoke nostalgia while being more complex and on a grander scale. All the original areas were brought back in Anniversary, but redesigned around modern gaming conventions. Botta said that the team picked out the most interesting parts of each area to preserve, leaving out the "less interesting hallway traversal" of the original. The environmental design saw an upgrade compared to those in Legend. The animals, primary enemies in the original Tomb Raider, were carried over into Anniversary, but redesigned to appear as threatening and dangerous as possible so people would see them as a threat and not feel too uncomfortable about killing them. The graphic deaths of the original were also toned down at Botta's suggestion so they could earn a lower age rating and sell to a wider audience.

When designing each environment, the art team would first create them with a low colour palette and desaturated lighting to increase their realism. They would then add colourful elements such as foliage, combining that with different types of lighting. Changing levels of light and darkness as Lara explored each location were used to convey a sense of mystery. Peru was given a variety of environments, transitioning from snowy mountains to lush jungle to an underground tomb. The Lost Valley area, which had become a fan favourite since the original release, was redesigned using available technology and hardware to be more open. The gameplay was condensed into a smaller area compared to the original, which spread its puzzles and platforming through adjoining caves. Greece was designed around the theme of a subterranean temple hidden in a mountain. Egypt focused on the motif of bright sunlight, magnifying the use of lighting to promote mystery; its layout and design saw the least overall changes when compared to the original Tomb Raider. The main difference was in its scale and variety. The Lost Island area was given a unique design with volcanic elements and fantastic architecture unlike any of the other locations to act as the game's thematic finale.

=== Game design ===
As part of their research for Anniversary, the developers played through the original game multiple times, pinpointing its characteristic and iconic elements that needed to be carried over into the remake. A large amount of time was spent deciding what would be included, what elements to keep and what to change so it would appeal to old and new players alike. Anniversary was developed using an updated and expanded version of the Legend engine, but with expanded gameplay elements and moves for Lara which in turn impacted level design. The design was influenced by the team's previous experience with Legend. The puzzles were mostly redesigned based on the technology and physics engine of Legend. Much of the original game's focus on item collection and pulling switches was included, but the developers tried not to rely on this style too much, adding more variety with physics-based puzzles and environmental set pieces. When creating the puzzles, the team needed to take a second look at their design techniques so they could make puzzles and their solutions more visible and intuitive.

An element they took into consideration was criticism of Legend's linear environments, with Anniversary being built with a philosophy of branching paths and an emphasis on exploration. This style was possible due to it being a core part of the original game. Lara's original inventory was also carried over from Tomb Raider, removing some of the tools introduced in Legend. When the Peru areas were being created, Gard was eager to redesign the village area of Vilcabamba, an area the rest of the team did not know existed. The village was rebuilt to be better portray Vilcabamba's now-extinct civilisation. St Francis' Folly was extensively redesigned to make puzzles larger and more complex, with many elements in Anniversary such as the giant statue of Atlas in one of the challenge chambers being parts of the original game that could not be completed. This theme of expansion continued through the rest of the areas. The Egypt levels were themed around traps and puzzles, taking a more prominent place than in other areas. The Lost Island levels were changed in various ways; the "Natla's Mines" area was made more manageable, while later levels within the Atlantean pyramid were made larger and more intricate.

=== Audio ===
The music for Anniversary was written by Troels Brun Folmann, who had previously created the score for Legend; a lot of Folmann's work revolved around reworking and expanding the original game's themes. The main theme was similar to that used in the first game, except with more advanced orchestral elements. The goal for Anniversary's music was to convey a sense of adventure. While his work on Legend involved a large number of electronic and rhythm instruments to blend musical genres, Folmann changed to a purely orchestral score for Anniversary. Also in contrast to Legend, which used dynamic music throughout its levels, Anniversary used sparse musical cues combined with environmental ambience.

The goal for Folmann was to translate the music into an evolved version for Anniversary while remaining faithful to the original. The sound team wished only to use a traditional symphonic style; the use of strings, brass, woodwinds percussion and choirs combined with the "classic" settings used in the game. This purely orchestral approach carried over into the cutscenes. All of the thematic elements from Tomb Raider, including the choir segments, were present in the new score. Alongside remade themes, Folmann composed original tracks and new musical elements. For the Egypt levels, Folmann used instrumentation incorporating Persian musical styles, which he described as "typical" for representing Egyptian music. Folmann worked on the score for five months.

== Release and versions ==
The existence of Anniversary was hinted at by Eidos staff member Ian Livingstone during an interview shortly after the release of Legend in May 2006. The game was announced under the provisional title Tomb Raider 10th Anniversary Edition in June of that year, along with its planned platforms of PlayStation 2 (PS2), PlayStation Portable (PSP) and Windows personal computers (PC). Its official title was revealed in November.

Crystal Dynamics co-developed the PS2 version with Buzz Monkey Software. During development, Crystal Dynamics wanted to push the PS2 version to its technical limits with the scale and quality of environments, which caused problems for the PSP conversion as this was at odds with designs that would run smoothly in the console. While the conversion was successful, LaMar described the process as "primarily a brute-force approach". The PC version was developed by Nixxes Software. Anniversary was originally planned only for PC and PlayStation platforms as they had a long association with Tomb Raider. Due to fan demand, the team created an Xbox 360 port. To reach release as soon as possible, the 360 version was originally planned as a series of downloadable segments through the Xbox Live Arcade, with a later full retail release. To download, players needed a copy of Legend for the 360, which was explained by Eidos as a means of bringing the game to players as quickly as possible. This plan was later changed so the Xbox Live version would be released the month after the retail version.

Anniversary was the first Tomb Raider title for the Wii, developed to expand Eidos's game catalogue into new Nintendo consoles. Due to receiving Wii development kits fairly late from Nintendo, the Wii version could not be released at the same time as other home console versions. A port of the console and PC version was developed for OS X by Feral Interactive and Robosoft Technologies and published by Feral Interactive. The mobile phone version was developed by FinBlade. The game was modelled on an earlier trilogy of original Tomb Raider games for mobiles.

The game was released for PS2 and PC on 1 June 2007 in Europe, 5 June in North America, and 7 June in Australia. A limited Europe-exclusive Collector's Edition was released alongside the standard edition; the Collector's Edition included a copy of the game, a DVD featuring a documentary on the series and promotional material for earlier games, and a CD of music from both Anniversary and Legend. The PSP version was released in North America on 9 August, in Europe on 26 October, and in Australia on 2 November. The Xbox 360 port was released on 23 October in North America, 26 October in Europe, and 2 November in Australia. Anniversary was the first full video game title made available for download on Xbox Live Arcade. The Wii version was released on 13 November 2007 in North America, 7 December in Europe and 7 February 2008 in Australia. Spike published the PS2, PSP, Wii and Xbox 360 versions in Japan on 27 March 2008. The first print versions came with a "10th Anniversary Edition" DVD including promotional material, a documentary, and soundtrack selection. The mobile version was published by Eidos Interactive in December 2007. The OS X port was released on 15 February 2008.

Anniversary was later ported to PlayStation 3 (PS3) by Buzz Monkey Software and released as part of the Tomb Raider Trilogy collection alongside its sequel Tomb Raider: Underworld and a PS3 port of Legend. The collection included PS3 avatars and documentary shorts on all three games. Tomb Raider Trilogy was published worldwide during March 2011.

=== Cancelled Core Design version ===
A remake of Tomb Raider to commemorate the game's tenth anniversary was proposed by Core Design, who at the time were working on Free Running. Several Core Design staff wanted to remake Tomb Raider for the PSP and PS2. They received permission from Eidos to create the remake under the title Tomb Raider: 10th Anniversary, and began development in late 2005 for a release during the 2006 holiday season. The remake would have retained the original story and gameplay flow, with adjustments for new players and some rearrangements to puzzles. According to staff, the game was at an advanced development stage. During production, Eidos asked Core Design to adjust Lara's model to more closely match that used in Legend. The team intended Jonell Elliott, who voiced Lara from Tomb Raider: The Last Revelation to The Angel of Darkness, to reprise her role for the remake.

In 2006, following the sale of Core Design to Rebellion Developments, the remake was cancelled. While Eidos gave no explanation for the cancellation, it was assumed by some Core Design staff that they did not want the Tomb Raider franchise to be developed by a third-party studio. According to series veteran Gavin Rummery, Eidos cancelled the project after seeing a demo of the opening for Legend on PSP and deciding Crystal Dynamics could successfully deliver the games on more platforms than Core Design could at the time. Prior to and following the cancellation, footage from an internal presentation was leaked online. 10th Anniversary had reached an alpha state at the time of the cancellation, with much of the core mechanics complete as well as levels in Peru, Greece, and Croft Manor; this build was leaked online in 2021. Core Design had attempted to reskin this version of the game as an Indiana Jones or a National Treasure title, but this was never released.

== Reception ==
Reception

Aggregate scores
Aggregator	Score
GameRankings	81% (PS2)
Metacritic	83/100 (PC); 78/100 (PSP); 77/100 (360); 73/100 (Wii)

Review scores
Publication	Score
1Up.com	A− (PS2); B (PSP); B- (Wii); C+ (360)
Eurogamer	9/10 (PC/PS2/360); 4/10 (Wii)
GameSpot	8/10 (PC/PS2); 7.5/10 (PSP/360); 7/10 (Wii)
GameSpy	4/5 (PS2); 3.5/5 (PC/PSP/360); 3/5 (Wii)
IGN	7.8/10 (PC/PS2/PSP); 7.6/10 (360); 7/10 (Wii)
Official Nintendo Magazine	90%

Anniversary received positive reviews following its initial release on PC and PS2, with many calling it a worthy remake of the original game. 1UP.com's Joe Rybicki called the game a homage in its own right. Eurogamer's Kristan Reed said that Anniversary merited a higher score than Legend due to its less linear structure and lower frequency of tutorials. GameSpy's Patrick Joynt praised the recreation and expansion of the original game's locations and gameplay, but faulted the camera control and some "unforgiving" puzzles. Ryan Davis of GameSpot greatly enjoyed Anniversary, calling it a further step in fixing the franchise following the success of Legend, though he faulted its unwillingness to experiment with the formula. Greg Miller, writing for IGN, praised the updated environments and controls, and despite problems with the graphics, found that it managed to capture the original game's spirit. Reviewers generally recommended the PC version over the PS2 due to lower quality graphics.

The 360 version saw praise for its gameplay and environments, comments shared with other versions, but the graphics were generally faulted. Common complaints were frame rate drops, low-quality textures, and a lack of the console-specific upgrades seen in Legend. The PSP port was lauded as a high-quality port of the PS2 version, although difficult camera control and technical issues such as frame rate drops and long load times were points of criticism.

The Wii port's redesigned controls—and the incorporation of motion controls into gameplay—divided opinion; some praised them or at least enjoyed their implementation, while others found several elements clumsy or unnecessary. The port's graphics also received praise, being cited as visually equal or superior to the PS2 version despite noticeable drops in frame rate. Unintuitive camera control was a frequent criticism. IGN's Matt Casamassina called the port a competently executed enhanced port of PS2 that happens to be good fun at its best and frustrating at its worst. Tom East of Official Nintendo Magazine was very positive in his review, praising the game's implementation of Wii control functions in addition to its general gameplay and design.

Anniversary was nominated at the 2007 National Academy of Video Game Trade Reviewers awards under the "Art Direction in a Game Engine" category. The mobile version won the award for "Best Mobile Game" at the 2007 The Independent Game Developers' Association ceremony.

=== Sales ===
Upon its release, both the PC and PS2 versions topped their respective charts in the United Kingdom. In North America, the PS2 version was among the top five most rented console games for June 2007. The game remained in the top five best-selling games in Europe during June 2007. Speaking in September of that year, Eidos parent company SCi Entertainment stated all profits for that period were created by the success of Anniversary and Hitman: Blood Money. The PS2 and Wii versions received a "Silver" sales award from the Entertainment and Leisure Software Publishers Association (ELSPA), indicating sales of at least 100,000 copies in the United Kingdom. As of 2009, the game has sold 1.3 million copies worldwide. This makes Anniversary the worst-selling Tomb Raider game to date.

== Sequel ==
Work on Anniversary ran parallel with the development of Crystal Dynamics' next generation Tomb Raider title Underworld. Underworld was built on a new game engine, evolved the gameplay incorporating a greater moveset and more advanced physics, and concluded the narrative of Legend and Anniversary. The concurrent development of Anniversary resulted in staff shortages of Underworld. The game was released in 2008 for PS3, 360, PC, PS2, Wii, Nintendo DS and mobile.
