= Tactical Manager =

1994 video game

- Cover art with Giovanni Trapattoni
- Developer: Talking Birds
- Publisher: Black Legend Software
- Designer: Camy Maertens
- Platforms: Amiga, Atari ST, MS-DOS
- Release: 1994
- Genres: Sports video game, simulation
- Modes: Single-player, multiplayer

Tactical Manager is an association football management simulator video game for the Amiga, Atari ST, and MS-DOS. It was developed by Camy Maertens of the then-defunct Essex-based UK developer Talking Birds and published by Black Legend Software in 1994.

== Gameplay ==
Tactical Manager is a football management simulator that allows one to 46 players to play simultaneously. There are no set goals, but the aim is to manage a football team to be as successful as possible. To achieve this the player can pick the team, set tactics and buy and sell players.

== Reception ==
Tactical Manager received mixed reviews. CU Amiga magazine rated the game 87%, calling it "Extremely involving", while Amiga User International magazine rated it 45% and said that the game looks dated when compared to other management games available. Later on a new game called Tactical Manager 2 was released.
