= GameLab London =

Gamelab London is an enterprise and action research initiative of London Metropolitan University Department of Computing.

Their directors are all senior or principal lecturers in the department's multimedia group, and all three have previous careers and ongoing consultancy roles in industry. In addition, they play an active role in the British Interactive Media Association and BAFTA Interactive.

== Overview ==
Gamelab London has developed a collaborative model of engagement with industry, independent practitioners and the education sector, including Student Associates - which drives a two-way flow of knowledge, concepts and best practice through all of its work.

GameLab London is based in Hoxton, London.

== See also ==
- Game Network
