= Killer (pool) =

Multi-player variant of straight pool

Killer or killers is a multi-player folk variant of straight pool in which each player is assigned a set number of "lives" and takes one shot per inning to attempt to pocket (pot) a ball, or else lose a life. Usually if the player scratches then an additional life is lost. It is a popular pub game because it can involve a potentially unlimited number of players, and offers the opportunity for each player to bet a small amount of money for a reasonable return in winner-takes-all. There are often other local subrules such as potting the black (8 ball), or any two balls in one shot (including white), gives the player an extra life, or that failure to pocket a ball on the break shot does not cost a life (in which case the shooter shoots again). The game is sometimes called killer pool.

Killer pool is the main game subject of the Side Pocket video game series.
