= Embryo (video game) =

1994 video game

- Developer: Beyond Arts
- Publisher: Black Legend
- Composers: Marko Sekulić, Zvonko Tešić
- Platform: Amiga
- Release: EU: 1994
- Genre: Combat flight simulation
- Modes: Single-player, multiplayer

Embryo is a 3D first-person shoot 'em up video game released in 1994 for the Amiga. It was developed by Croatian developer Beyond Arts and published by Black Legend. The player assumes the role of a pilot who mans an advanced fighter in order to drive the aliens invading the Earth away. The game bears semblance to flight simulation games, but is described as pure mayhem without any emphasis on realism.

== Gameplay ==
The aircraft can be steered with either the mouse, joystick or keyboard, whereas the player also uses buttons on the keyboard or mouse to manage weapons and flight controls. Weapons include cannons, guided and unguided missiles, energy balls and machine guns placed either frontally or sideways. The HUD displays a map, radar, speed and status reports. The game is also notable for allowing two-player co-op.

== Reception ==
Reception

Review scores
Publication	Score
CU Amiga	88%
Amiga Power	62% (ECS); 70% (AGA)
Amiga Format	69%
The One Amiga	81%
Amiga Action	82%

The game received generally positive reviews upon release. The sound effects and music were lauded. Reviewers particularly praised its very smooth and fast gameplay, at the expense of the relatively simpler graphics. However, the high difficulty, specifically the toughness of the enemies, has been criticized.
