= Cat hair mustache puzzle =

Puzzle from video game Gabriel Knight 3

Gabriel Knight wearing the cat hair mustache and trying to pose as Detective Mosely on the passport

The cat hair mustache puzzle is a puzzle in the 1999 adventure game Gabriel Knight 3: Blood of the Sacred, Blood of the Damned. It involves disguising the protagonist, Gabriel Knight, with hair from a cat to steal a motorcycle rental. It was created by the producer, Steven Hill, after a puzzle designed by the lead designer, Jane Jensen, was cut due to budgetary reasons. The designers disliked the puzzle, but left it in due to time constraints.

The puzzle has been called one of the worst puzzles in the adventure game genre. It has been used as an example of the strange logic of adventure game puzzles which some authors, such as writer Erik Wolpaw, blamed for a decline of the genre.

== Puzzle and solution ==
The puzzle appears in Gabriel Knight 3: Blood of the Sacred, Blood of the Damned, during which the eponymous character is required to impersonate another man, Detective Mosely, and take his motorcycle rental. To do this, Gabriel must collect a variety of items.

Although Mosely does not have a mustache, one of the requirements of the puzzle is nonetheless to create a fake mustache using cat hair. The cat hair is acquired by first attaching a strip of masking tape to a small opening at the bottom of a shed door. Then a water bottle sprayer (or "spritzer") is used to spray a cat, causing it to run through the shed door opening, leaving some of the cat's fur stuck to the tape, which Gabriel then retrieves. Gabriel then uses a packet of maple syrup to attach the cat hair to his face, creating a fake mustache.

Gabriel must also steal Mosely's passport to use as ID. A piece of candy is used to distract Mosely, allowing Gabriel to steal his passport from his pocket. However, because Gabriel is now using a fake mustache to impersonate someone who does not have a mustache, Gabriel must use a magic marker to draw a mustache onto Mosely's passport photo. Gabriel then heads to Mosely's room to steal his coat and don it, along with a red cap he finds in the lost and found to hide that he is not bald like Mosely. He then returns, disguise complete, and is given Mosely's motorcycle rental.

== Concept and creation ==
The puzzle was created by Gabriel Knight 3: Blood of the Sacred, Blood of the Damned producer Steven Hill. It came as a result of a puzzle created by the game's designer, Jane Jensen, needing to be removed due to budget concerns. The cat hair mustache puzzle was unpopular with the game's lead technical designer, Scott Bilas, as well as other members of the development team, but was included due to time constraints. Jensen attributed the difficulty of the cat hair mustache puzzle to both the length of the puzzle and the lack of hints, stating, "I certainly would not do anything like that today. I think it's kinda overblown."

== Reception and legacy ==
The puzzle was criticized for the differences between Gabriel and Mosely, particularly the lack of a mustache on Mosely.

The cat hair mustache puzzle has received negative reception from critics, coming to be known as shorthand for "obscure and illogical actions" players may need to take in adventure games. PC World writer Hayden Dingman called it an "infamous" puzzle and emblematic of how difficult Sierra games can be. Kotaku writer Kirk Hamilton identified it as an icon of terrible puzzles in adventure games, and felt that no one would be able to solve it without a strategy guide. In his review of Gabriel Knight 3, Computer Gaming World writer Tom Chick identified it as the most notable aspect of the game, despite finding later puzzles more difficult. He explains that the earlier appearance of the puzzle caused a greater impact as a result. Gamasutra writer Christian Nutt felt that the puzzle was obtuse, stating that it was not something a player would ever think to do. Hardcore Gaming 101 writer Kurt Kalata called it the game's most "infamous" puzzle; he felt that such an "odd" puzzle would be appropriate for a more cartoony game like Maniac Mansion: Day of the Tentacle, but that the Gabriel Knight series is more firmly grounded in realism, making the puzzle seem "absurd". A puzzle in the video game Broken Sword 5: The Serpent's Curse requires players to make a goatee and mustache using adhesive strips and stuffed dog fur, spurring IGN writer Chuck Osborn to speculate whether it was a reference to the cat hair mustache puzzle.

Jane Jensen took some blame for the decline in the popularity of adventure games due to Gabriel Knight 3, with game designer Erik Wolpaw placing blame on her for the puzzle's poor design. Wolpaw was critical of the puzzle for requiring people to make a fake mustache in order to impersonate someone without a mustache, and described the actual process of constructing the mustache as "deranged". GamesRadar+ writer Charlie Barratt included it in their list of the "stupidest puzzles" in video games, suggesting that the puzzle was "illogical and irrational" and that the puzzle contributed to adventure games dying out. Despite the blame laid on the puzzle for killing adventure games, author Grant Bollmer disputed this notion, instead placing blame on corporate restructuring, "meddling in the creative process", and an "increasing scale" in video games' popularity.

The puzzle has also been criticized by other game designers. Campo Santo designer and programmer Nels Anderson felt that adventure games from the 1990s were good in spite of their gameplay, claiming that no one plays them for their "obtuse puzzles", citing the cat mustache puzzle specifically. Anderson was critical of the puzzle particularly due to the game expecting players to don a fake mustache to impersonate someone who does not have one. Frictional Games co-founder Thomas Grip identified the puzzle as a "shining example" of what gameplay designers should not do.

== See also ==
- The Goat Puzzle – another infamous puzzle from a 1990s adventure game
- Le Serpent Rouge puzzle – another puzzle from the same game with a much more positive reputation
