= Bulldog Interactive =

British video game developer

- Type: Video game developer
- Industry: Video games
- Founded: 1999
- Headquarters: Ashby-de-la-Zouch, Leicestershire, United Kingdom
- Products: Cue Club, Cue Club 2
- Website: www.bulldoginteractive.com

Bulldog Interactive is a British independent video games developer, established in 1999 with their central office located in Ashby-de-la-Zouch, Leicestershire, England. Bulldog specializes in cue sports games and is best known for developing the Cue Club series of pool and snooker simulations.

== Background ==
Bulldog specializes predominantly in PC video games development, although it also has experience in making console games, notably for the Nintendo DS handheld platform. In 2014 Bulldog became a licensed Xbox One developer. As a small independent studio, Bulldog focuses its efforts primarily on developing its own in-house products, with the goal of creating unique, polished and entertaining experiences for the international gaming community.

== Technology ==
Bulldog creates its games using the C and C++ programming languages, making use of DirectX technology for its PC titles. The studio uses a proprietary, internally developed engine, which it has evolved and adapted over the years and is specifically tuned to handle the complexities of cue sports simulations.

== Games developed ==
- Cue Club (PC)
- Cue Club (Coin-op)
- Trickshot (PC)
- TG Pool (PC)
- World Cup of Pool (Nintendo DS - European release)
- World Cup of Pool (Nintendo DS - US release)
- Cue Club 2 (PC)

== Publishers and Distribution Partners of Bulldog Games ==
- Microsoft
- Valve
- Nintendo
- Midas Interactive Entertainment
- Avanquest
