= Neon Play =

British software development company

Neon Play was a British mobile application development company founded in 2010 by Oli Christie. The company is best known for its games on iOS and Android. The ten billionth download on the Apple App Store was a download of their game Paper Glider. More than 130 million downloads have been made so far.
