= FinBlade =

British video game developer and publisher

- Company type: Private
- Industry: Mobile game & Mobile application development
- Founded: 2007; 19 years ago
- Founder: John Chasey, Fergus McNeill, Steve Longhurst & Barry Simpson
- Headquarters: Eastleigh, UK
- Website: www.finblade.com

FinBlade is a British mobile game and mobile app developer. FinBlade was founded by John Chasey, Fergus McNeill, Steve Longhurst and Barry Simpson in August 2007. Much of the FinBlade team previously worked at mobile game developer IOMO.

== History ==
The studio were one of the first supporters of the Zeemote Bluetooth analogue joystick for mobiles with their 2-Player Fireworks title announced in January 2008.

Later that month the new studio received critical success when FinBlade won the TIGA Best Mobile Game category for Tomb Raider: Anniversary, developed for the New Media division of Eidos Interactive. This was followed in June 2008 where they were nominated in the Best New UK/European Studio category in the Develop Industry Excellence Awards.

In the second half of 2008, making use of the Bedrock technology from Metismo the studio's output was largely focused on the Apple iPhone with many original and licensed titles appearing and charting on the App Store.

Google Android support quickly followed with versions of many of their titles appearing for distribution on Handango, before billing support was added to the Android Market. FinBlade later received nominations in the 'Best Casual Game' and '2009 Groundbreaker' categories for Tennis Slam in the Handango Champion Awards for the Android.

In June 2009 with the advent of a broader range of mobile content available on the iPhone FinBlade also started developing applications, commencing with Red Bull GP on the iPhone, published by Red Bull Racing, The Men Who Stare at Goats app promoting the film adaption of Jon Ronson's book, followed by a match report and news centre app for Liverpool F.C. All the app titles reached the top of their respective category charts in the UK App Store.

In December 2009, FinBlade’s iPhone game Battleship, based on the Hasbro board game and published by EA Mobile, was praised as the "best board game adaptation yet" by cNET.com and earned a Gold Award from mobilegamefaqs.com.

2010 saw a series of mobile versions of the Deadliest Catch TV series from Discovery Channel, published by Hands-On Mobile which won the Mobile Village Superstar Award in the Consumer App: Game category, and another Hasbro title Pictureka!, published by EA Mobile.

In 2011 the multi-format title Spellathon was developed for the charity mencap, a spelling-bee game featuring Stephen Fry, on the web and mobile devices which seeks to both educate and raise funds for the charity.

During 2013 they agreed a deal with Puzzler Media, a subsidiary of DC Thomson to create a new social / mobile destination for puzzle players, Puzzler World.

== Awards ==
- 2008 TIGA Best Mobile Game - Tomb Raider
- 2008 Nominated Develop Industry Excellence Awards - Best New UK/European Studio
- 2009 Nominated Handango - Best Casual Game - Tennis Slam
- 2009 Nominated Handango - 2009 Groundbreaker - Tennis Slam
- 2010 MobileVillage Superstar Award - Consumer App: Game - Deadliest Catch

== Android titles ==
- Movie Quiz published by FinBlade (Link on Handango)
- Spellathon published by mencap
- Tennis Slam published by FinBlade (Link on Handango)
- WordSearch published by FinBlade (Link on Handango)

== BlackBerry titles ==
- Deadliest Catch published by Hands-On Mobile
- Spellathon published by mencap

== BREW titles ==
- Deadliest Catch published by Hands-On Mobile
- Movie Quiz published by CyberHull
- WordSearch published by CyberHull

== Facebook titles ==
- "Puzzler World" published by Puzzler (Link onFacebook)

== Flash titles ==
- Spellathon published by mencap

== iPhone & iPad titles ==
- Battleship published by EA Mobile (Link on UK AppStore)
- Battleship for iPad published by EA Mobile (Link on UK AppStore)
- Deadliest Catch published by Hands-On Mobile (Link on US AppStore only)
- English Grammar in Use published by Cambridge University Press (Link on UK AppStore)
- Ernie Els Golf 2008 published by FinBlade
- GrooveYard published by FinBlade (Link on UK AppStore)
- Halloween WordSearch published by FinBlade (seasonal availability)
- Liverpool FC Match & News Centre published by Liverpool F.C.
- Manchester United Word It! published by FinBlade
- Movie Quiz published by FinBlade (Link on AppStore)
- Pictureka! published by EA Mobile (Link on UK AppStore)
- Sopa De Letras published by FinBlade (Link on AppStore)
- Red Bull GP published by Red Bull Racing
- Spellathon published by mencap
- Spot The Difference published by FinBlade (Link on AppStore)
- The Men Who Stare at Goats published by Momentum Pictures
- Tennis Slam published by FinBlade (Link on AppStore)
- WordSearch published by FinBlade (Link on AppStore)
- Fry - virtually Stephen Fry published by HeadCast Ltd (Link on UK AppStore)
- Puzzler World published by Puzzler Media (Link on UK AppStore)

== Java ME titles ==
- BMW Racer published by Connect2Media
- Deadliest Catch published by Hands-On Mobile
- Ernie Els Golf 2008 published by Player One Mobile
- Fireworks (unpublished)
- Movie Quiz published by CyberHull
- Pub Darts 180 published by Vivendi Games Mobile
- Tomb Raider: Anniversary published by Eidos Interactive
- Total Film Quiz published by Connect2Media
- WordSearch published by CyberHull

== webOS titles ==
- Deadliest Catch published by Hands-On Mobile

== Windows Mobile titles ==
- Deadliest Catch published by Hands-On Mobile
