= Black Legend (company) =

British video game publisher

- Company type: Subsidiary
- Industry: Video games
- Founded: 1992; 34 years ago in Switzerland
- Founder: Richard M. Holmes
- Defunct: 1996
- Fate: Dissolved
- Headquarters: Welwyn, England
- Number of locations: 2 offices
- Area served: United Kingdom, Germany
- Key people: Richard M. Holmes; Steven Bailey; Duncan Lowthian
- Parent: Kompart (1993–1996)

Black Legend was a British video game publisher predominantly active in the Amiga games market. Founded in Switzerland in 1992 by Richard M. Holmes, it moved to Hertfordshire (St Albans, then Welwyn), England, the following year when it became part of distribution company Kompart. Black Legend found success working with smaller developers, often from ex-Soviet Union countries. Following a stark decline of the Amiga games market in 1994, Black Legend shut down in 1996, followed by its German office in Mülheim an der Ruhr later that year.

== History ==
Black Legend was founded in 1992 by Richard M. Holmes, at the time 20 years old and residing in Switzerland. The company targeted the games market for Amiga systems, which was largely neglected at the time, while also working on some games for personal computers. Black Legend worked with external developers, mostly small studios with just a handful of people and teams based in ex-Soviet Union countries. Not long into the company's lifetime, Holmes came in contact with Steven Bailey of the British game distribution company Kompart. Bailey visited the Black Legend offices and the two companies subsequently struck a partnership. By August 1993, Black Legend had become a part of Kompart, with Holmes, Bailey and Duncan Lowthian (Bailey's business partner) acting as both companies' joint directors. Through this move, Black Legend became co-located with Kompart in St Albans, England. With Kompart serving distribution, marketing, and public relations, Black Legend could focus solely on the publishing aspect.

By the holiday season of 1993, Black Legend had published four games: Fatman: The Caped Consumer, developed by Hungarian studio I/O Product for Amiga and MS-DOS; Moscow Nights, a collection of Russian-based games for MS-DOS and Microsoft Windows; Hyperion, a low-budget Amiga game developed by Norwegian team Offence Software; and Hungary for Fun, a compilation of games including Kid Pool, Logic, and Zarcan.

In 1994, Black Legend relocated from St Albans to Welwyn and opened a regional office in Mülheim an der Ruhr, Germany, with staff formerly of developer Blue Byte. This office received Black Legend games in shipments from the England headquarters, localised them, and distributed them in Germany. However, by this time, publishers had started moving on from Amiga systems to more relevant systems like the PlayStation; eventually, the Amiga 4000T was the last Amiga model to be released. Kompart realised this in 1995 and consequently decided to close Black Legend, which happened the following year. The German office still published Colony Wars 2492 from Digital X-citement before entering insolvency in July of that year. Attempts to sell Five-A-Side Soccer and Evil's Doom, which were already complete, to distributors like Schatztruhe failed. Holmes subsequently became the European product manager for Eidos Interactive before founding several other video game companies, such as IncaGold, Play Sunshine, and Lolly.

== Games published ==
Year	Title	Platform(s)
1993	Fatman: The Caped Consumer	Amiga, MS-DOS
1993	Moscow Nights	Amiga, Microsoft Windows, MS-DOS
1993	Hyperion	Amiga
1993	Hungary for Fun	Amiga
1994	Football Glory	Amiga, MS-DOS
1994	Mega Motion	Amiga
1994	Exploration	MS-DOS
1994	Crystal Dragon	Amiga
1994	Statix	Amiga
1994	Tactical Manager	Amiga, Atari ST, MS-DOS
1994	Tactical Manager Italia	Amiga
1994	Embryo	Amiga
1995	Tower of Souls	Amiga, MS-DOS
1995	Behind the Iron Gate	Amiga
1995	Tactical Manager 2	Amiga
1995	Wheelspin	Amiga
1995	Inordinate Desire	MS-DOS
1995	Demo Maniac	Amiga
1995	Turbo Trax	Amiga
1995	Citadel	Amiga
1996	Colony Wars 2492	MS-DOS

=== Cancelled ===
- Five-A-Side Soccer
- Evil's Doom
