= Tactical Manager 2 =

1995 video game

- Developer: Talking Birds Ltd
- Publisher: Black Legend Software
- Designer: Camy Maertens
- Platforms: Amiga, Windows
- Release: Amiga: WW: 1995; Windows: WW: 2000
- Genre: Sports simulation
- Modes: Single-player, multiplayer

Tactical Manager 2 is a football management simulator video game for the Amiga and Windows. It was developed by Camy Maertens of the then-defunct Essex-based UK developer Talking Birds and published by Black Legend Software in 1995.

== Gameplay ==
Tactical Manager is a football management simulator that allows one to 46 players to play simultaneously. There are no set goals, but the aim is to manage a football team to be as successful as possible. To achieve this the player can pick the team, set tactics and buy and sell players.

== Product description ==
Take charge of your favourite team and take them to cup and league victory in Tactical Manager 2, sequel to one of the top rated football management games ever made. The focus is on ultra realism and you'll need every trick in the book to transform your club's fortunes. You can also view match highlights with three levels of detail: goals only, highlights and real-time.
