= Alca Electronics =

British manufacturer of arcade games

- Industry: Arcade games
- Founded: November 1967 in Manchester, UK
- Founders: Alan Carter, Geoff Ellis
- Defunct: August 1982
- Fate: Liquidated
- Area served: Worldwide, mostly UK
- Key people: Jimmy Horrocks, Martin Bromley
- Number of employees: ~4,000 at peak

Alca Electronics, styled ALCA on their products, was a British manufacturer of arcade games, starting with electro-mechanical games and later moving to video games. While they designed their own electromechanical games, most of their video games were unlicensed copies of other designs, starting with Atari's Pong, which they called Ping Pong. Ping Pong reached the UK market six months before Atari, becoming the first video game made in Europe. During their heyday, they branched out to pool tables and fruit machines and similar devices, becoming one of the larger electronics manufacturers in Manchester area.

A series of events in the early 1980s led to the rapid downfall of the company. In August 1981, Martin Bromley, former founder of Sega and now one of the company's major distributors, was convicted of VAT tax fraud and his assets were frozen. In November, Alca began selling off their machines at low prices to keep the cash flowing. In February 1982, Sega's recently formed European division sued Alca for copyright infringement over their copy of Frogger. With little money coming in, and the costs of a lawsuit only starting, the company was liquidated in August 1982.

== History ==
Alca formed in November 1967, named for Alan Carter. Alan was the son of Eddie Carter of Mayfield Electronics, another arcade game manufacturer, where Alan had been working. Carter formed the company with another Mayfield employee, electrical engineer Geoff Ellis. Their first game, released in early 1968, was the two-player electro-mechanical game (EM) Attack, where the player pointed a swivel-mounted gun at various targets that would appear from behind fixed terrain. It was notable for its use of a chair that the player sat on while aiming the gun, a feature that would appear on a number of their later games. It was considered one of the highlights of the 24th Amusement Trades show.

That month, Alca signed an exclusive distribution agreement with Jimmy Horrocks' Phonographic Equipment (part of Phonographic Ruffler & Walker, PRW), which started in the juke box business and had extensive sales channels into bars and similar venues across Europe. Alca introduced a series of popular EM games during this era, notably 1970's Target UFO, which sold worldwide. The company moved to a new 44,000 square feet (4,100 m^{2}) factory during this period, and branched out to coin-operated pool tables and fruit machines.

Horrocks approached Carter and asked if he could produce a version of Sega's 1969 EM game Missile, but Ellis instead introduced a greatly improved version, Super Missile. This made a great impression at a January 1970 trade show, where 300 machines were ordered. This success caught the attention of American businessmen Martin Bromley, who had originally formed what became Sega in Hawaii in 1940 with two partners. He had been forced from the US due to the anti-gambling Johnson Act of 1951, which led to the formation of Sega as a Japanese company. In 1969, Gulf+Western bought Sega from Bromley and his partner Dick Stewart, and Bromley moved to the UK. Bromley kept possession of Club Specialty, a subsidiary he set up in Panama to handle distribution of Sega products outside Japan. Cash-flush and looking to re-enter the arcade market, Bromley saw Alca as a perfect opportunity and purchased Horrocks' 2/3 stake in the company, hiring PRW salesman Mike Green to run it. The sale was announced in July 1972.

Green was at the 1972 show where Atari introduced Pong. He managed to get a Pong printed circuit board (PCB) and placed it in a generic console. In February 1973 they showed this at a trade show in the UK, where it was a huge hit. He then flew to Boston where the actual Pong boards were being produced, and purchased 300 additional examples for $150 each. They then packaged them in their own cases, calling the result Ping Pong. (Note: In the UK, "pong" is a euphemism for a terrible smell, so they felt the name had to be changed.) This is the first video game made in Europe, and was being sold six months before Atari's own versions started to appear in the country. For the rest of their history, the company would produce unlicensed versions of other company's games, including Scramble (as Bomber) and Rally X (Road Runner), while at the same time licensing others, like Carnival.

In March 1981, Ellis left the company. Shortly thereafter, Bromley settled a Value Added Tax fraud case in a record £2.7 million settlement. During the trial, his assets were frozen and sales of Alca's machines through PRW, their major distributor, ended. Alca soon ran into cashflow problems, and in November they began to sell off their systems at lowered prices. In February 1982, Sega's recently formed European division sued Alca for copyright infringement, accusing them of buying a single Frogger board and then making 100 copies sold into the local market. While Alca won several injunctions that would have made Sega's case difficult, they did not have the cash to continue. When Bromley's businesses were unfrozen he declined to provide additional funding, and in August 1982 the company was liquidated. The Sega case is now often quoted in other copyright cases and books.
