= The Tomb of God =

1996 book by Richard Andrews and Paul Schellenberger

- Author: Richard Andrews; Paul Schellenberger
- Publication date: 1996
- ISBN: 0-316-87997-5

The Tomb of God is a 1996 non-fiction book by Richard Andrews and Paul Schellenberger, which charted as a number one bestseller. It claimed that the body of Jesus Christ was reburied in the 12th century on Pech-le-Cardou (Mount Cardou) in Rennes-le-Château. They arrived at this idea through tracing map references within the parchments described in the book Holy Blood, Holy Grail. However, the authors do not succeed in locating the tomb or evidence relating to it on the mountain itself.

The book became the focus of a BBC 2 documentary "The History of a Mystery" shown in September 1996, in which the authors faced difficult questions over their methods and assumptions. The theory is not taken seriously by academic scholars.

== Bibliography ==
- Richard Andrews, Paul Schellenberger, The Tomb of God: The Body of Jesus and The Solution To A 2000-year-old Mystery (London: Little, Brown, 1996 ISBN 0-316-87997-5).
