= List of Crystal Dynamics games =

Crystal Dynamics is an American video game developer that was founded in 1992 by Madeline Canepa, Judy Lange, and Dave Morse. Based in the San Francisco Bay Area, California, Crystal Dynamics was the first licensed developer for the 3DO Interactive Multiplayer console. Their first release, Crash 'n Burn, was included as a pack-in game with the console. The 3DO's launch during the 1993 Christmas season was a commercial failure, severely damaging Crystal Dynamics' software strategy. In 1994, the company became a publisher for two new gaming platforms, the PlayStation and the Sega Saturn. The studio was acquired by Eidos Interactive, a British video game publisher, in 1998, which was in turn bought by Square Enix in 2009.

Crystal Dynamics is best known for developing the Legacy of Kain and Gex series. Although the first Legacy of Kain video game was developed by Silicon Knights, Crystal Dynamics gained the rights to the franchise in 1998 and released four sequels between 1999 and 2003. In 2003, the studio took over the development of the best-selling Tomb Raider franchise after its original developer, Core Design, failed to gain critical or commercial success with their later games. Crystal Dynamics' first Tomb Raider game, Tomb Raider: Legend, became a commercial success with 4.5 million copies sold as of February 2009. Its sequel, Tomb Raider: Underworld, sold 2.6 million copies. Since 2003, the studio has developed five games in the series, encompassing two reboots of the franchise.

== Video games ==
=== Developed ===
Over 30 video games have been developed by Crystal Dynamics. The following table showcases the corresponding title, release date, publisher and the platforms on which each game was released along with any other relevant information. A detailed overview of each game can be found in their corresponding articles.

Key
Blank cell indicates title was not released on any platform(s) by the specified manufacturers
Cell with games console(s) indicates title was released on platform(s) by the specified manufacturers

List of games developed by Crystal Dynamics
Title	Release details	Platform(s)				
Title	Release details	Microsoft	Nintendo	Sega	Sony	Other
Crash 'n Burn	Genre: Racing; Publisher: Crystal Dynamics; Release date: 1993					3DO
Total Eclipse	Genre: Simulation; Publisher: Crystal Dynamics; Release date: 1994				PlayStation	3DO
Off-World Interceptor	Genre: Shooter; Publisher: Crystal Dynamics; Release date: 1994			Saturn	PlayStation	3DO
Samurai Shodown	Genre: Fighting; Publisher: Crystal Dynamics; Release date: 1994					3DO
Gex (Note: The PlayStation version of Gex was developed by Beam Software.)	Genre: Platform; Publishers: BMG Interactive; Release date: April 1995	Windows		Saturn	PlayStation	3DO
Solar Eclipse	Genre: Shooter; Publisher: Crystal Dynamics; Release date: 1995			Saturn	PlayStation	
3D Baseball	Genre: Sports; Publisher: Crystal Dynamics; Release date: October 31, 1996			Saturn	PlayStation	
Pandemonium 2	Genre: Platform; Publishers: Midway Games; Release date: September 30, 1997	Windows			PlayStation	
Gex: Enter the Gecko	Genre: Platform; Publishers: Midway Games; Release date: January 1998	Windows	N64; GBC		PlayStation	
Akuji the Heartless	Genre: Action; Publisher: Eidos Interactive; Release date: December 31, 1998				PlayStation	
Gex 3: Deep Cover Gecko (Note: The Nintendo 64 version of Gex 3: Deep Cover Gecko was developed by Gratuitous Games.)	Genre: Platform; Publisher: Eidos Interactive; Release date: March 1, 1999		N64; GBC		PlayStation	
Legacy of Kain: Soul Reaver (Note: The Dreamcast version of Legacy of Kain: Soul Reaver and the Windows version of Soul Reaver 2 were developed by Nixxes Software.)	Genre: Action; Publisher: Eidos Interactive; Release date: August 16, 1999	Windows		Dreamcast	PlayStation	
Walt Disney World Quest: Magical Racing Tour (Note: The Game Boy Color version of Walt Disney World Quest: Magical Racing Tour was developed by Prolific Publishing.)	Genre: Racing; Publisher: Eidos Interactive; Release date: March 23, 2000	Windows	GBC	Dreamcast	PlayStation	
102 Dalmatians: Puppies to the Rescue (Note: The Microsoft Windows version of 102 Dalmatians: Puppies to the Rescue was co-developed with Prolific Publishing; the Game Boy Color version was developed by Digital Eclipse Software and the PlayStation version by Toys for Bob.)	Genre: Platform; Publishers: Eidos Interactive; Release date: November 8, 2000	Windows	GBC	Dreamcast	PlayStation	
Soul Reaver 2	Genre: Action; Publisher: Eidos Interactive; Release date: October 31, 2001	Windows			PlayStation 2	
Mad Dash Racing	Genre: Racing; Publisher: Eidos Interactive; Release date: November 14, 2001	Xbox				
Blood Omen 2 (Note: The Windows, Xbox and GameCube versions of Blood Omen 2 were developed by Nixxes Software.)	Genre: Action; Publisher: Eidos Interactive; Release date: March 21, 2002	Windows; Xbox	GameCube		PlayStation 2	
Legacy of Kain: Defiance (Note: The Windows and Xbox versions of Legacy of Kain: Defiance were developed by Nixxes Software.)	Genre: Action; Publisher: Eidos Interactive; Release date: November 11, 2003	Windows; Xbox			PlayStation 2	
Whiplash	Genre: Action; Publisher: Eidos Interactive; Release date: November 18, 2003	Xbox			PlayStation 2	
Project: Snowblind (Note: The PC and Xbox versions of Project: Snowblind were developed by Nixxes Software.)	Genre: Shooter; Publisher: Eidos Interactive; Release date: February 22, 2005	Windows; Xbox			PlayStation 2	
Tomb Raider: Legend (Note: The Nintendo DS version of Tomb Raider: Legend was developed by Human Soft, and the PlayStation Portable version by Crystal Dynamics along with Buzz Monkey Software.)	Genre: Action; Publisher: Eidos Interactive; Release date: April 7, 2006	Windows; Xbox; Xbox 360	GameCube; GBA; DS		PlayStation 2 PSP; PlayStation 3	
Tomb Raider: Anniversary (Note: The Mac OS version of Tomb Raider: Anniversary was developed by Robosoft Technologies and published by Feral Interactive. The Windows version was developed by Nixxes Software. The mobile version was developed by FinBlade.)	Genre: Action; Publisher: Eidos Interactive; Release date: June 5, 2007	Windows; Xbox 360	Wii		PlayStation 2 PSP; PlayStation 3	Mac OS; Mobile
Tomb Raider: Underworld (Note: The PlayStation 3 and Windows versions of Tomb Raider: Underworld were developed by Nixxes Software; the Nintendo DS version by Santa Cruz Games. The Mac OS version of the game was published by Feral Interactive.)	Genre: Action; Publishers: Eidos Interactive; Release date: November 18, 2008	Windows; Xbox 360	DS; Wii		PlayStation 2 PlayStation 3	Mac OS
Lara Croft and the Guardian of Light (Note: The iOS version of Lara Croft and the Guardian of Light was developed by Ideaworks Game Studio. The PlayStation 3 and Windows versions of the game were co-developed with Nixxes Software.)	Genre: Action; Publisher: Crystal Dynamics; Release date: August 18, 2010	Windows; Xbox 360			PlayStation 3	iOS; Stadia
Tomb Raider (Note: Additional development by Eidos Montréal; ported to Microsoft Windows, PlayStation 3, PlayStation 4, and Xbox One by Nixxes Software, and to OS X and Linux by Feral Interactive.)	Genre: Action-adventure; Publisher: Square Enix; Release date: March 5, 2013	Windows; Xbox 360; Xbox One			PlayStation 3 PlayStation 4	Mac OS; Linux; Stadia
Lara Croft and the Temple of Osiris	Genre: Action; Publisher: Square Enix; Release date: December 9, 2014	Windows; Xbox One			PlayStation 4	Stadia
Lara Croft: Relic Run	Genre: Endless runner; Publisher: Square Enix; Release date: May 28, 2015	Windows Phone				iOS, Android
Rise of the Tomb Raider (Note: Rise of the Tomb Raider is the sequel to the 2013 Tomb Raider video game. The Xbox 360 version was developed by Nixxes Software. The Mac OS X and Linux version was developed by Feral Interactive.)	Genre: Action-adventure; Publishers: Square Enix; Release date: November 10, 2015	Windows; Xbox 360; Xbox One			PlayStation 4	Mac OS; Linux; Stadia
Shadow of the Tomb Raider	Genre: Action-adventure; Publishers: Square Enix; Release date: September 14, 2018	Windows; Xbox One			PlayStation 4	Mac OS; Linux; Stadia
Marvel's Avengers	Genre: Action; Publisher: Square Enix; Release date: September 4, 2020	Windows; Xbox One; Xbox Series X/S			PlayStation 4 PlayStation 5	Stadia
Perfect Dark	Genre: Action; Publisher: Xbox Game Studios; Release date: Cancelled	Windows; Xbox Series X/S				
Untitled Tomb Raider game	Genre: Action; Publisher: Amazon Games; Release date: TBA	TBA			TBA	TBA

=== Published ===
In addition to developing its own video games, Crystal Dynamics also published several games by other developers in the mid-1990s, sometimes serving as the publisher only for specific platforms or in specific regions.

List of games published by Crystal Dynamics
Title	Release details	Platform(s)				
Title	Release details	Microsoft	Nintendo	Sega	Sony	Other
The Horde	Genre: Strategy; Developer: Toys for Bob; Release date: 1994	Windows		Saturn	PlayStation	3DO
Star Control II	Genre: Strategy; Developer: Toys for Bob; Release date: 1994					3DO
Slam 'N Jam '95	Genre: Sports; Developer: Left Field Productions; Release date: 1995					3DO
Slam 'N Jam '96 Featuring Magic & Kareem	Genre: Sports; Developer: Left Field Productions; Release date: August 9, 1996	MS-DOS		Saturn	PlayStation	
Blazing Dragons	Genre: Adventure; Developer: The Illusions Gaming Company; Release date: October 31, 1996			Saturn	PlayStation	
Pandemonium (Note: Published only.)	Genre: Platform; Developer: Toys for Bob; Release date: October 31, 1996	Windows		Saturn	PlayStation	
Blood Omen: Legacy of Kain	Genre: Action-adventure; Developer: Silicon Knights; Release date: November 15, 1996	Windows			PlayStation	
