= Gex =

Gex or GEX may refer to:

== People ==
- Amélie Gex (1835–1883), French writer and poet
- Émilie Gex-Fabry (born 1986), Swiss ski mountaineer, biologist, and botanist
- John Peter De Gex (1809–1887), English barrister and law reporter
- Walter J. Gex III (1939–2020), American judge

== Places ==
- Gex, a commune in Ain, Auvergne-Rhône-Alpes, France
- Arrondissement of Gex, Ain department, France
- Canton of Gex, Ain department, France
- Le Colomby de Gex, a summit in the French Jura Mountains
- Gex Land (French: pays de Gex), a historical region of the Duchy of Savoy, in modern France and Switzerland

== Other uses ==
- Gex (series), a video game series by Crystal Dynamics
  - Gex (video game)
  - Gex: Enter the Gecko
  - Gex 3: Deep Cover Gecko
- Bleu de Gex, a type of cheese
- Garre language, with ISO 639-3 code "gex"
- Geelong Airport in Victoria, Australia, with IATA code GEX
- Geometry Expert (GEX), Chinese geometry theorem software
- German Entrepreneurial Index (GEX), a German stock market index
