= Gex 3: Deep Pocket Gecko =

1999 Game Boy Color video game

- Developer: David A. Palmer IMS Productions
- Publisher: Eidos Interactive
- Series: Gex
- Platform: Game Boy Color
- Release: November 1999
- Genre: Platformer
- Mode: Single-player

Gex 3: Deep Pocket Gecko is a 1999 platformer video game developed by David A. Palmer IMS Productions and published by Eidos Interactive for the Game Boy Color. It is part of the Gex of games, where the player controls a gecko named Gex through a series of television and film-themed 2D side-scrolling levels where he collects various items to progress through the game. In the game, Gex is trying to reach Agent Xtra who has been kidnapped and must reach his long-standing enemy Rez-Raker to do so.

Gex 3: Deep Pocket Gecko follows Gex: Enter the Gecko (1998) as the second game in the series for the Game Boy Color. It follows a similar plot and level scheme as the earlier console game Gex 3: Deep Cover Gecko (1999). Reviewers complimented the animation of Gex in the game with some reviewers finding the large levels in it to be positive while others found it detracted from its overall quality. While IGN and Video Games found it superior to the previous Gex game on the system, reviewers in Computer and Video Games and Player One found it inferior to the many platforming titles available on the Game Boy Color.

== Plot and gameplay ==
Relaxing at a lost island hideaway in the South Pacific, Gex discovers that Agent Xtra has been kidnapped. He enters worlds parodying television and film themes and genres to rescue her. Levels with different themes from television and film media, such as Westerns, anime or Rankin/Bass holiday specials. Once Gex has gone through all the levels and collects remotes, he is able to take on the final boss, Gex's long standing enemy Rez-Raker.

Deep Pocket Gecko is a 2D side-scrolling platformer. The game occasionally mimic the sense of a third dimension, with platforms that slant upward to give you the player the option of moving to a new part of the world such as through staircases while boss battles feature an isometric angle to the playfield.

In the game, the player controls an anthropomorphic gecko named Gex who can move left and right, duck, and enter doors. The player can manipulate Gex's jumps to jump further and higher by either running in a direction or holding buttons before jumping. Gex also has the ability to crawl on some walls in the game. Gex can jump, use his tail to swat enemies, and his tongue to snap health-restoring flies out of the air. Gex has new abilities in the game. He also has not abilities in regular gameplay such as the ability to swim. If the player loses a life, they have to begin the objective again at the start of the level.

Levels can be chosen in any order. Deep Pocket Gecko drops five of the themes for levels from Gex 3: Deep Cover Gecko. In the levels, the player must perform a certain number of tasks, such as smashing three water towers or defeating a diabolical Santa Clause to earn remote controls that he can use to enter further areas. The game also features two mini-games in which Gex can snowboard and ride a kangaroo.

== Development and release ==
Gex debuted on Panasonic's 3DO and was later ported over to the PlayStation and Sega Saturn consoles. The game expanded into a series with new titles released for the PlayStation and Nintendo 64. Gex 3: Deep Pocket Gecko transfers all the levels from the PlayStation and Nintendo 64 versions of Gex 3: Deep Cover Gecko (1999) into 2D format for the Game Boy Color. It was developed by the same team who developed the previous Game Boy Color version of Gex: Enter the Gecko (1998), David A. Palmer IMS Productions and the second Gex game made for the Game Boy Color.

Gex 3: Deep Pocket Gecko was published by Crystal Dynamics's parent company Eidos Interactive and released in November 1999. Crystal Dynamics had already signed a deal for a Gex 3 game on the Nintendo 64 and Game Boy Color when it was acquired by Eidos in 1998. The European version of the game has slight differences, such as Gex's human partner, Agent Xtra, having a slimmer waist.

== Reception ==
Reception

Review scores
Publication	Score
Computer and Video Games	2/5
Game Informer	7.5/10
GameSpot	8.1/10
IGN	6/10
Nintendo Power	7.2/10
Player One	52%
Video Games (DE)	4/5
Gaming Age	C

General overviews of Gex 3: Deep Pocket Gecko generally positive summaries from Daily Radar who described it as "One of those rare third party Game Boy games that looks like actual effort was put into its creation" to GameSpot saying it "doesn't possess the charm of some of the other Game Boy platformers, it does stand proudly on its own." and Computer and Video Games describing it as "formulaic and frustrating" and was "yet another Game Boy Color platformer that gets lost in the pack."

In terms of level design, Video Games and Game Informer found the game's large areas to explore as a positive, with the latter publication calling it "rock-solid level design." Gaming Age, IGN and Player One found the large levels to be detractor, with Nintendo Power and Player One describing them as feeling more like empty mazes and due a lack of enemies. The IGN reviewer said that objectives in the world were often spread so far apart that you'll easily get lost trying to locate the next item to accomplish a task. Computer and Video Games and Gaming Age also found that missing a jump in the game often meant and overt amount of back-tracking from the beginning of the level. Computer and Video Games added that the jumping in the game was also more difficult than it needed to be as the platform to leap towards to progress was often offscreen.

GameSpot said that the control in the game was excellent but that Gex's tail-bounce ability would take time to get used to. Player One echoed this saying most of these jumps would result in failure and said that controls were frustrating as the attack and jump buttons are swapped in comparison to most platformers. Game Informer described the control as the game's "biggest drawback", writing that players will have Gex die at least once due to a failed tail-bounce.

Both GameSpot and Computer and Video Games complimented on the animation of Gex's sprite. Nintendo Power found the games to make good use of its color. Gaming Age responded saying that while neither the environments nor the enemies are especially detailed, the only character that seems to have a good amount of animation is Gex. Player One said that some platforms are in the game were too difficult to see. In terms of audio, Nintendo Power said that Gex fans will miss the one-liners and provided by Dana Gould in the console versions, while IGN said that "On the plus side, you'll never, ever, ever hear Dana Gould. Ever. God bless the Game Boy Color's sound weakness."

Both Video Games and IGN found the game superior to Gex: Enter the Gecko (1998). Nintendo Power found it lacking in terms of variety to the Deep Cover Gecko, with less mission objectives and variety in Gex's abilities.

Gaming Age compared the game's graphics to Dragon Warrior Monsters (1998) and Turok: Rage Wars (1999), finding Deep Pocket Gecko to be visually less impressive than those titles. Player One recommended audiences to choose one of the many other excellent platformers available for the Game Boy Color and elsewhere while IGN concluded that "Gex: Deep Pocket Gecko isn't Super Mario Bros. Deluxe, but it is a well put together platformer."

== See also ==
- List of Eidos Interactive games
- List of Game Boy Color games
