= Gex: Enter the Gecko (GBC video game) =

1998 video game

- Developer: David A. Palmer IMS Productions
- Publisher: Crave Entertainment
- Programmer: Roo
- Artists: Chris Edwards; Jim Meston
- Composer: Firq
- Series: Gex
- Platform: Game Boy Color
- Release: NA: November 23, 1998
- Genre: Platformer
- Mode: Single player

Gex: Enter the Gecko is a 1998 platformer video game by David A. Palmer IMS Productions for the Game Boy Color. It takes its themes for levels from the 3D platform game Gex: Enter the Gecko (1998) while maintaining some abilities from the 2D game Gex (1995).

The game was published by Crave Entertainment in November 1998. Along with Virtual Pool 64 (1998), Milo's Astro Lanes (1998) for the Nintendo 64 and Pitfall: Beyond the Jungle (1998) and Men in Black: The Series for the Game Boy Color, the games gave Crave a $40 million proft in the fourth quarter of 1998.

The game received positive reviews from Game Informer and Total Games while IGN and the Los Angeles Times found it to be too simple of a game to hold a player's attention for extended periods of play.

== Gameplay ==
Gex: Enter the Gecko is a single-player 2D platformer. In the game, the player controls Gex, who can move left and right, enter doors, crouch, perform a tail whip and climb some walls. Gex can avoid or destroy enemies and collect tokens scattered throughout the levels.

The players starts with five lives per game and has a health meter shown by four paws at the bottom of the gameplay screen. Each time Gex takes damage, he loses a paw. He can re-gain health by eating flies. By using his tail-whip ability, Gex can manipulate small television sets found in levels that will release flies. which can offer health, extra lives, invincibility, or fill his health bar fully. Gex can use his tailwhip to manipulate other objects in the game such as gears and elevators.

== Development and release ==
Gex originally appeared on the 3DO video game console in a 2D platformer. This was followed by a sequel in 3D on the Nintendo 64 and PlayStation. In 1998, after the announcement of several games for release on the Game Boy Color at E3, a version of Gex: Enter the Gecko (1998) was announced for the then-upcoming handheld game system.

Gex: Enter the Gecko applies the themes of parodies of popular television shows and films from the 3D game, and applies them to a 2D game. Gex: Enter the Gecko was developed by the David A. Palmer IMS Productions. The game's programming is credited to "Roo" and its graphics to Chris Edwards and Jim Meston while its music and sound effects are credited to "Firq".

It was released for the Game Boy Color on November 23, 1998 and published by Crave Entertainment. Crave Entertainment was founded by Nima Taghavi in 1997 from distributor SVG Distribution, inc. Crave Entertainment released five games for the Nintendo 64 and Game Boy Color for the holiday season for 1998. Crave generated over $40 million in revenue during its fourth quarter through their releases such as Virtual Pool 64 (1998), Milo's Astro Lanes (1998) for the Nintendo 64 and their line-up of Game Boy Color titles: Pitfall: Beyond the Jungle (1998), Men in Black: The Series (1998) and Gex: Enter the Gecko. The senior marketing director of Crave, Jane Gilbertson, said the three games did well over the holiday season and in January, partially because they were all based on solid licenses.

== Reception ==
Reception

Review scores
Publication	Score
Game Informer	8/10
IGN	5/10
Nintendo Power	6.4/10
Total Games	90%

Among the more generally positive reviews, Game Informer complimented the large number of levels, the high-quality animation, and the addictive nature of the game. Total Games found it superior to its 3D release as it retained Gex's abilities from the original 3DO game, such as the wall-climbing ability. The reviewer also complimented that the game did not suffer from the camera issues in the 3D title. Aaron Curtiss of the Los Angeles Times said that "What made Gex such a likable character were his smarmy dialogue and irascible behavior. What makes him such a bore on Game Boy is that all of that is gone."

Reviewers in IGN and the Los Angeles Times found the game to simple of a game with the first publication saying it had little to hold the player's attention while the latter said that it was "a primitive side-scroller that doesn't even look or play as well as some of my games from the early 1990s." Nintendo Power found that collission detecion in the game poor."

IGN said that the music and sound in the game was "absolutely abominable." being short, annoying and repetitive and unfitting for this or any game.

== See also ==
- List of Game Boy Color games
