= Pitfall: Beyond the Jungle =

1998 video game

- Developer: David A. Palmer IMS Productions
- Publisher: Crave Entertainment
- Programmer: Nigel Speight
- Artist: Martin Smith
- Series: Pitfall
- Platform: Game Boy Color
- Release: NA: December 1998; EU: February 1999
- Genre: Platformer

Pitfall: Beyond the Jungle is a 1998 platformer video game developed by David A. Palmer IMS Productions and published by Crave Entertainment for the Game Boy Color. The game features Pitfall Harry's son, Pitfall Harry Jr. as he enters an interdimensional rift to help a band of rebels led by a woman named Mira. The game features side-scrolling gameplay with the player controlling Pitfall Harry Jr. through various levels themed around areas like jungles and volcanoes.

Pitfall: Beyond the Jungle was part of a series in Pitfall games that were released in 1982 to 1986. During the 1990s, Activision would resurrect the series with games like Pitfall: The Mayan Adventure (1994) and Pitfall 3D: Beyond the Jungle (1998). Following the 3D games release in early 1998, Pitfall: Beyond the Jungle was released in December 1998. Along with Virtual Pool 64 (1998), Milo's Astro Lanes (1998) for the Nintendo 64 and Gex: Enter the Gecko (1998), Men in Black: The Series for the Game Boy Color, the games gave Crave a $40 million proft in the fourth quarter of 1998.

Reception ranged from 64 Magazine and Game Informer praising the games graphics while 64 Magazine and IGN writing that the game paled in comparison to similar games in the Wario Land and Super Mario series.

== Plot and gameplay ==
Pitfall: Beyond the Jungle feature's Pitfall Harry's son, Pitfall Harry Jr.. While exploring the jungles of South America, a rift appears and Harry is met with Mira the leader of a group of rebels. Mira is against an entity known as The Scourge and seeks help from outside of her dimension to fight back. Harry heads into the city of Shenrak to destroy the evil Scourge.

Pitfall: Beyond the Jungle is a side-scrolling platform game. In the game, Pitfall Harry Jr. can be controlled move left and right, jump and crouch. Harry can also perform long jumps by standing on an edge of a cliff before jumping. He is equipped with an axe to attack enemies swing from hooks placed on walls all while collecting treasure along the way. The game starts the player with four lives. Harry has a health meter and when it runs out, he loses a life. Health power-ups and extra lives can be collected throughout the stages.

The game features four environments with themes of jungles, caverns, volcano and a prison. The first three environments have four levels while the prison environment has two. After each environment area, the player is presented with a password which can be used to resume their game.

== Background and development ==
Activision was one of the first third-party video game publisher. The publisher went to build and expand and their portfolio, with academic David B Nieborg stating that chief among their catalogue was Pitfall! (1982). The game playable character was Pitfall Harry, who became was the first popular video game character originating in home video game consoles. A string of Pitfall! games were released for arcades and homes consoles between from 1982 to 1986.

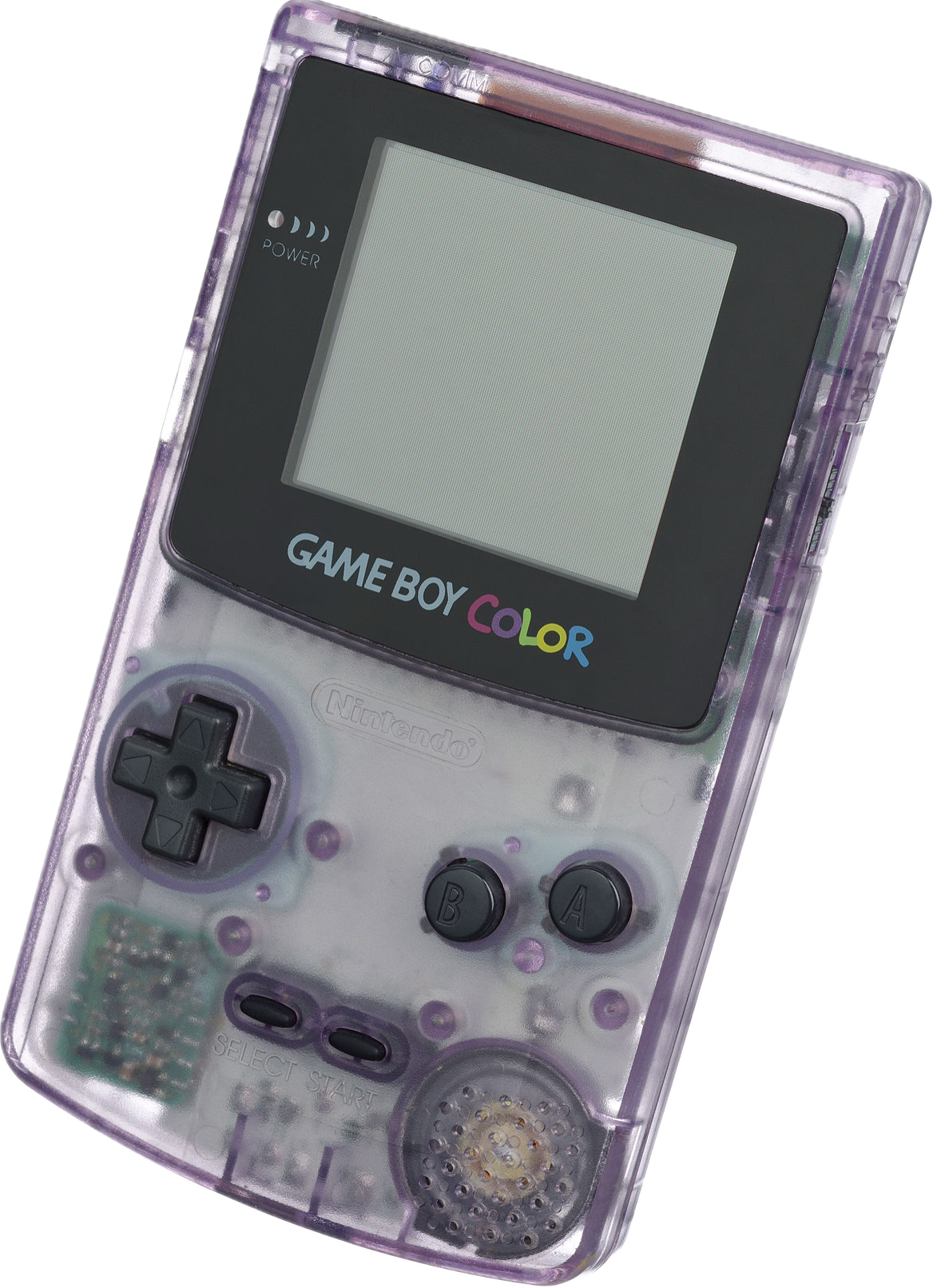
Pitfall: Beyond the Jungle was one of the three games Crave Entertainment published for the Game Boy Color for the 1998 holiday season.

In the 1990s, Robert 'Bobby' Kotick would lead a group of investors to transform Activision by restructuring the company by keeping intellectual property licenses and taking the publisher public in 1993. In 1995, Next Generation highlighted the revival of long dormant video game franchises, which included Activision releasing Pitfall: The Mayan Adventure (1994). Two new Pitfall games would follow in 1998: Pitfall 3D: Beyond the Jungle (1998) for the PlayStation and Pitfall: Beyond the Jungle for the Game Boy Color.

Pitfall: Beyond the Jungle was developed by the Sheffield-based development company David A. Palmer IMS Productions. The game was programmed by Nigel Speight with graphics by Martin Smith and music and sound effects by Mark Cooksey, Pete Frith and Allister Brimble.

Pitfall: Beyond the Jungle was set for release in late 1998. It was released for the Game Boy Color in December 1998 by Crave Entertainment. Crave Entertainment was founded by Nima Taghavi in 1997 from distributor SVG Distribution, inc. Crave Entertainment released five games for the Nintendo 64 and Game Boy Color for the holiday season for 1998. Crave generated over $40 million in revenue during its fourth quarter through their releases such as Virtual Pool 64 (1998), Milo's Astro Lanes (1998) for the Nintendo 64 and their line-up of Game Boy Color titles: Gex: Enter the Gecko (1998), Men in Black: The Series (1998) and Pitfall: Beyond the Jungle. The senior marketing director of Crave, Jane Gilbertson said the three games did well over the holiday season and in January, partially because they were all based on solid licenses. It was released in Europe in February 1999. It was published by Pony Canyon in Japan with the title Pitfall GB (ピットフォールGB, Pittofōru GB) on May 28, 1999.

== Reception ==
Reception

Review scores
Publication	Score
64 Magazine	3/5
Famitsu	17/40
Game Informer	6.5/10
IGN	3/10
Total Games Guide to Game Boy Color	81%

From contemporary reviews, critics in 64 Magazine and Game Informer complimented the game's graphics with the latter publications specifically highlighting the animation. Aaron Curtiss of the Los Angeles Times said the game suffered the same fate as the Game Boy Color version of Gex: Enter the Gecko, but ultimately was a superior game to Gex with more fresh levels that held onto their interest more. Reviewing the game for Billboard, Doug Reece said it was a "respectable effort" from Crave, as the game was engaging and challenging and the game's hidden levels and secret codes show "just how far Game Boy titles have come since the days of Tetris (1989)."

A number of video game publications ranged from lukewarm to poor reviews of the gameplay. The Total Games Guide to Game Boy Color said the gameplay was "all pretty-standard fare - but this is exactly what Pitfall fans will be looking for. Game Informer found the game had the same issue as its 3D counterpart released the same year which was "tedious play mechanics". Both 64 Magazine and IGN said the game paled in comparison to similar games in the Wario Land and Super Mario series.

== See also ==
- List of Game Boy Color games
