= Super Adventure Team =

- Genre: Satire; Puppetry
- Created by: Dana Gould; Robert Cohen
- Composer: Eban Schletter
- Country of origin: United States
- Original language: English
- No. of seasons: 1
- No. of episodes: 6

Production
- Running time: approx. 22 minutes

Original release
- Network: MTV
- Release: June 23 – August 27, 1998

Super Adventure Team is an American comedy series shown on the cable television network MTV in 1998. The show is a superhero satire series using puppetry, in the style of Thunderbirds.

== History ==
The show's co-creators, Rob Cohen and Dana Gould, met when writing for The Ben Stiller Show. The show debuted in July 1998 with a six-episode run.

The marionettes were voiced by comedians popular at the time, using aliases:

- Talia Criswell was played by Karen Kilgariff, stage name Barbara St. Bill.
- Benton Criswell was played by Paul F. Tompkins, stage name Francis Mt. Pleasant.
- Chief Engineer Head was played by creator Dana Gould, stage name Benjamin Venom.
- Major Landon West was played by Daran Norris, stage name James Penrod.
- Colonel Buck Murdock was played by Wally Wingert, stage name Grant W. Wyllie.

The plot centered around an allegedly effective disaster Incident response team bogged down with their own internal squabbles.

Keith Marder of the Los Angeles Daily News gave the show a positive review, saying that the use of puppetry gave the show an original look. He also thought that the show's comedy had the potential to make it a cult classic.
