= Evan Wells =

American video game designer

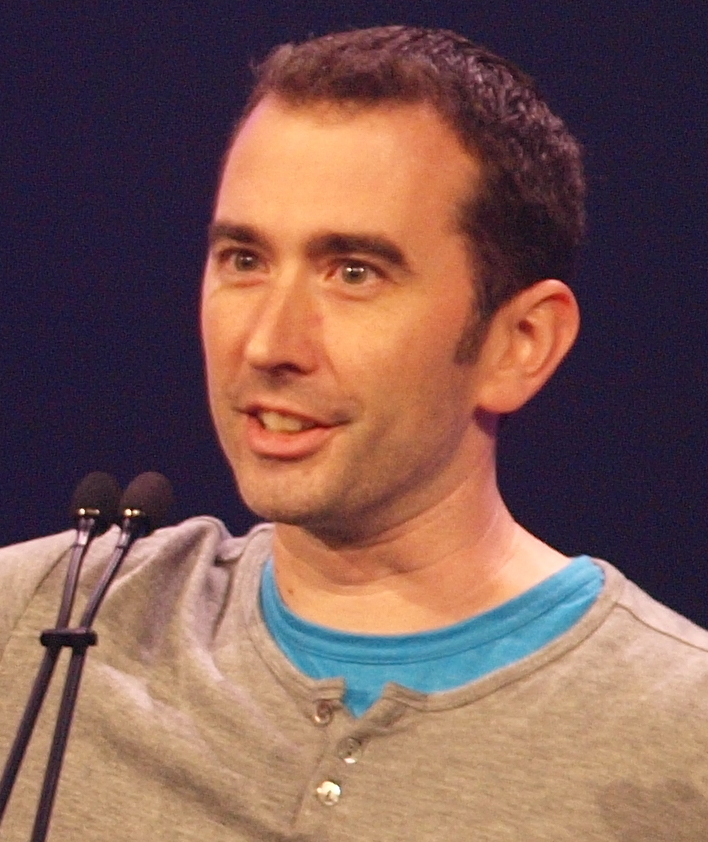
- Wells at the Game Developers Choice Awards in 2010
- Education: Stanford University
- Occupations: Game director; artist
- Years active: 1993–2023
- Employer: Naughty Dog
- Title: Co-president

Evan Wells is an American video game designer and programmer and former president of Naughty Dog. Wells's first video game was at Sega, where he worked on ToeJam & Earl in Panic on Funkotron, before moving to Crystal Dynamics in 1995 to work on Gex and Gex: Enter the Gecko. He was employed at Naughty Dog in 1998, working on several Crash Bandicoot and Jak and Daxter titles before becoming co-president of the company alongside Stephen White in 2005; White was replaced the following year by Christophe Balestra, who retired in 2017. The two oversaw the release of the Uncharted series, and The Last of Us. Wells remained the sole president, overseeing the release of The Last of Us Part II, until Neil Druckmann's promotion to co-president in 2020. Wells announced his retirement in 2023.

== Career ==
Evan Wells graduated from Stanford University in 1995 with a computer science degree. He worked at Sega in 1993, working on ToeJam & Earl in Panic on Funkotron (1993) as a lead tester, before working at Crystal Dynamics from 1994 to 1998, working on Gex (1995) as a programmer, and Gex: Enter the Gecko (1998) as lead designer. Wells then moved to Naughty Dog, where he worked on Crash Bandicoot: Warped (1998), Crash Team Racing (1999), Jak and Daxter: The Precursor Legacy (2001), Jak II (2003), Jak 3 (2004) and Jak X: Combat Racing (2005).

Following the departure of founders Jason Rubin and Andy Gavin in 2004, Wells became co-president of Naughty Dog alongside Stephen White; White was replaced by Christophe Balestra after a year. Wells continued to work as co-president during the release of the Uncharted titles (2007–17), as well as The Last of Us (2013). Balestra retired from the company in April 2017; Wells became the sole president. Neil Druckmann was promoted to vice president in March 2018, and to co-president alongside Wells in December 2020. Wells was an executive producer on the film Uncharted (2022), and on the television adaptation of The Last of Us with HBO. In July 2023, Wells announced he would retire by the end of the year. He was inducted into the Academy of Interactive Arts and Sciences' Hall of Fame at the 29th Annual D.I.C.E. Awards in February 2026, presented by Druckmann.

== Works ==
=== Video games ===
Year	Game title	Role
1993	ToeJam & Earl in Panic on Funkotron	Lead tester, level design
1995	Gex	Programmer
1998	Gex: Enter the Gecko	Lead designer
1998	Crash Bandicoot: Warped	Lead designer
1999	Crash Team Racing	Lead designer
2001	Jak and Daxter: The Precursor Legacy	Lead designer
2003	Jak II	Lead designer
2004	Jak 3	Lead designer
2005	Jak X: Combat Racing	Co-president
2007	Uncharted: Drake's Fortune	Co-president
2009	Uncharted 2: Among Thieves	Co-president
2011	Uncharted 3: Drake's Deception	Co-president
2013	The Last of Us	Co-president
2014	The Last of Us: Left Behind	Co-president
2016	Uncharted 4: A Thief's End	Co-president
2017	Uncharted: The Lost Legacy	President
2020	The Last of Us Part II	President

=== Film and television ===
Year	Title	Notes
2013	Grounded: Making The Last of Us	Documentary
2015	Conversations with Creators	Web series; Episode 2
2022	Uncharted	Film; executive producer
2023–present	The Last of Us	Television series; executive producer
