= Calgary Jewish Academy =

School in Alberta, Canada

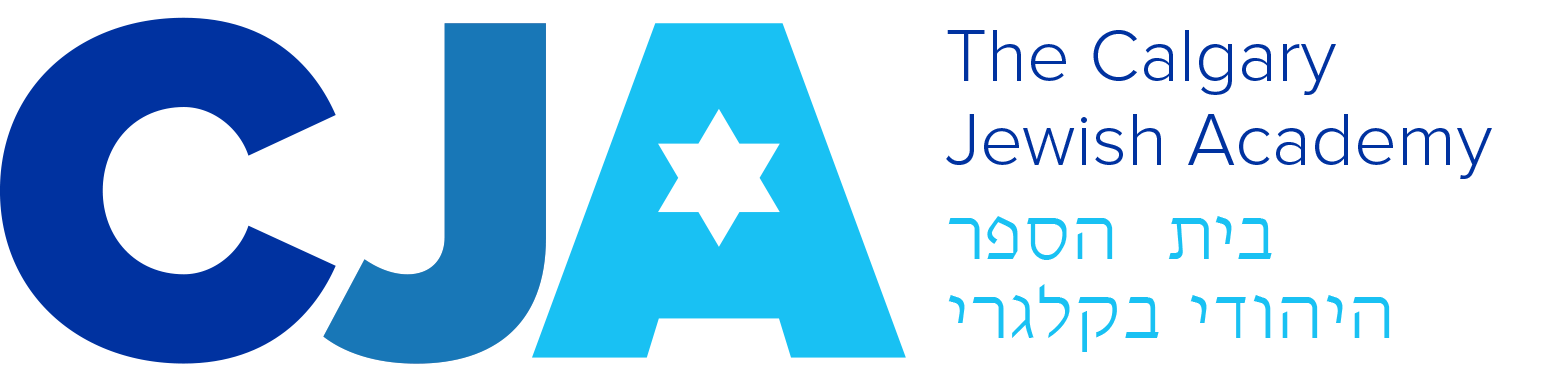

Location
- Calgary, Alberta, Canada; 51.0447°N 114.0719°W

Information
- Established: 1987 (Calgary Hebrew School in 1913, I.L. Peretz School in 1927)
- Grades: Nursery-9
- Team name: Hawks
- Website: www.cja.ab.ca

The Calgary Jewish Academy (formerly the Calgary Hebrew School, and I.L. Peretz School) is a historic Jewish independent school in Calgary, Alberta.

== History ==
The Calgary Jewish Academy (CJA) can trace its very beginnings to 1910, when nineteen students were enrolled in classes in the precursor to the CJA, The Talmud Torah, which operated in a single room and was associated with the local Synagogue. In 1913 the school became a separate entity from the synagogue and marked its true opening. At the close of the First World War, in 1920, the Talmud Torah acquired its own building located at 4th Avenue (between 2nd and 3rd Streets SE). The next ten years marked a time of steady growth for the school and in 1930 the school relocated to a new community building, becoming the Calgary Hebrew School. It was also around this time that the I.L. Peretz School was founded in 1927, primarily focusing on a Yiddish-Zionist based education. In 1987 the Calgary Jewish Academy was founded as a result of the amalgamation of the Calgary Hebrew School and the I.L. Peretz School. In May 2013, the Calgary Jewish Academy celebrated 100 years of Jewish education in Calgary. On 16 April 2019, Albertan Premier, Jason Kenney announced his new education platform at the CJA.

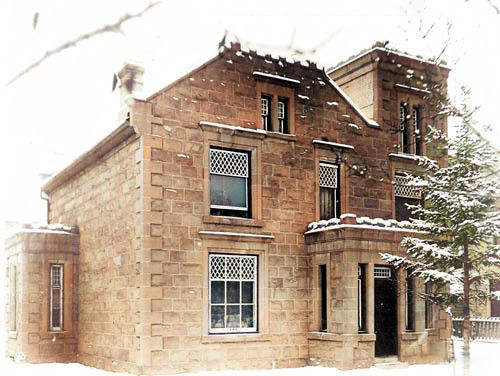
Colourized image of the Calgary Hebrew School located in downtown Calgary, taken after 1925

== Educational divisions ==
- Pre-School: Composed of Nursery, Junior Kindergarten & Kindergarten
- Elementary School: Composed of Grade 1 through Grade 6.
- Junior High: Composed of Grade 7 through Grade 9.

== GAIN and Alberta curriculum ==
The CJA employs the GAIN program, which attempts to work with individual students based on their needs and strengths by providing various supports and strategies such as individualized program planning, learning support and enriched learning, English as a Second Language (ESL) and guidance. The GAIN team has impacted almost 50% of students during the 2017/18 school year. The CJA follows a dual curriculum with anywhere from 68% of the class time being devoted to the Alberta curriculum and between 32% of their time on Judaic studies. However, throughout the year, teachers attempt to integrate the Alberta and Judaic curricula. The CJA uses Tal Am and Bishvil HaIvrit for the Hebrew language curriculum, and teaches about Israel through the program Israel Throughout the Year, developed by Israel's Bar Ilan University. Other Judaic subject areas have been developed by the CJA Judaic faculty, such as holidays, Jewish Social Studies and Bible curricula.

== Student life ==
Grade 7 trips: In grade 7, students spend a week in Salt Spring Island, British Columbia

Grade 8 trips: In grade 8, students spend a week in Washington, D.C.

Grade 9 trips: In grade 9, students spend two weeks in Israel.

== Notable Attendees ==
Ezra Levant - Canadian media personality.

Robert Cohen - Comedy writer and director.

Joel H. Cohen - Comedy writer and director.
