= Gex: Enter the Gecko =

1998 video game

- North American PlayStation box art
- Developer: Crystal Dynamics (Note: Ported to Nintendo 64 by Realtime Associates and LTI Gray Matter for Windows.)
- Publishers: PlayStation; EU: Crystal Dynamics; NA: Midway; JP: Bandai; Nintendo 64; NA: Midway; EU: GT Interactive; Microsoft Windows; NA: Midway; EU: Ubi Soft
- Director: Glen Schofield
- Producer: Jeffrey Zwelling
- Designer: Evan Wells
- Programmers: Adrian Longland; Daniel Chan
- Artists: Scott Anderson; Amy Bond; Bruce Straley; Chris Thompson
- Writers: Robert Cohen; Ken Daly; Dana Gould; Scott Steinberg
- Composers: Ted Allen; John Baker; Kurt Harland; Jim Hedges; Mark Miller
- Series: Gex
- Platforms: PlayStation; Nintendo 64; Microsoft Windows
- Release: PlayStation; NA: February 24, 1998; EU: April 3, 1998; Nintendo 64; NA: August 26, 1998; EU: February 26, 1999; Windows; NA: September 30, 1998; EU: 1998
- Genre: Platform
- Mode: Single-player

Gex: Enter the Gecko (Note: Known in PAL regions as Gex 3D: Enter the Gecko or Return of the Gecko on PlayStation and Windows or Gex 64: Enter the Gecko on the Nintendo 64. The Japanese PlayStation release is called Spin Tail (スピンテイル, Supin Teiru).) is a 1998 platform game developed and published by Crystal Dynamics for the PlayStation. It was originally released in 1998, with ports later released on the Nintendo 64 and Microsoft Windows the same year. The game is the second installment of the Gex video game series and the first with 3D graphics. Its protagonist, Gex, a TV-binging, wisecracking gecko, seeks to collect three types of remotes to unlock different TVs in the overworld that aid in the fight against his arch-nemesis, Rez.

After creating the original Gex, which released for the 3DO Interactive Multiplayer, PC, Sega Saturn, and PlayStation in 1995, developer Crystal Dynamics sought a sequel in the form of a 3D platform video game in the style of Super Mario 64. The Gex model was rebuilt with this perspective in mind, and much of the game's humor was inspired by the Fox animated sitcom The Simpsons, on which scriptwriter Robert Cohen had previously worked as a writer.

Critical reception of Gex: Enter the Gecko was mostly positive. Critics' main concerns centered on the game's camera, graphics, low-polygon enemies, and simplicity. A version for the Game Boy Color also titled Gex: Enter the Gecko (1998) was made in 2D and released in 1998. The game was followed by 1999's Gex 3: Deep Cover Gecko, which was released on the PlayStation, Nintendo 64, and Game Boy Color.

== Gameplay ==
Gex in the first level, "Out of Toon". Pawprints at the top represent his remaining health, and the carrots in front of him are collectibles. When Gex stands on the green button across the water, the player will finish the level if the requirements have been met.

The player controls Gex, an anthropomorphic gecko who runs, jumps, and attacks his way through television-themed levels. Gex can perform a tail whip attack, a tail bounce, and a flying karate kick, and he can climb certain walls and ceilings, a quality shared with real-life geckos. Gex's attacks can inflict damage on enemies, activate icons in the hub world that provide helpful hints, and break small TV sets that contain different colored flies, which, when consumed, can add an extra health point, add an extra life, unlock temporary upgrades, add oxygen in the outer space levels, or mark a level checkpoint. Specific stages require the player to collect power-ups to move throughout the level or to stay alive, as is the case with the futuristic stages in which the player must collect cyber energy to activate certain jump pads and bridges. While the majority of enemies can be defeated using Gex's move set, others must be eliminated by manipulating objects or machinery.

TV sets act as level entrances in the hub world, which expands as the player collects remotes and defeats boss enemies. Completing level objectives grants red and silver remotes in normal stages and gold remotes in bonus stages. Red remotes are collected by standing on a green button in front of in-world television sets after meeting level-specific objectives, which can be completed in any order, after which the player is transported to the hub world. Each normal stage has two silver remotes: one is hidden in the level, and another is awarded when the player collects 120 collectibles. Gold remotes are rewarded upon completion of bonus levels, which are unlocked by collecting silver remotes. Collecting all available remotes unlocks a special ending showcasing the game's concept art.

=== Nintendo 64 version ===
The game was ported to the Nintendo 64 by Realtime Associates. Due to hardware limitations, the Nintendo 64 version, called Gex 64, was heavily edited compared to the PSX and Windows versions. It features limited audio, reduced voice lines, a different introduction, no main menu, alterations to several background gags to conform to Nintendo's policies, and all cutscenes were omitted. One mainline level, three secret levels and two bonus levels are also missing. However, Gex 64 includes an exclusive underwater level named "Gecques Cousteau", which is centered on the RMS Titanic.

== Plot ==
Following his victory over Rez in the Media Dimension, Gex (voiced by comedian Dana Gould in the North American release, Leslie Phillips in the European release, and Mitsuo Senda in the Japanese release) has retired from the public eye and turned to solitude.

Two years later, Gex has his quiet life turned upside down when one day he is watching television when all of a sudden, it goes blank and Rez's image begins flashing on the screen. Two government agents appear and explain that Rez has returned and they need Gex's help in taking him down again. Gex refuses, saying that he has already saved the world once and that they should try to find someone else. In response, the agents abduct Gex to their headquarters, in which Gex is interrogated. When the agents make a fair negotiation for a huge sum of cash and gadgets, Gex tells them everything. He accepts the mission, to which he leaves the building and is then accosted by a female agent who introduces herself as Agent Xtra and wishes him good luck.

After navigating numerous television channels in the Media Dimension, Gex finally confronts Rez, and the two battle once again until Gex drops a huge television set on Rez severely weakening him. In desperation, Rez tells Gex through a television that he is his father. Gex merely turns the television off. Whether or not he believes Rez is unknown. In the final scene, Gex shares a hotel room with Nikki from the Pandemonium series.

== Development ==
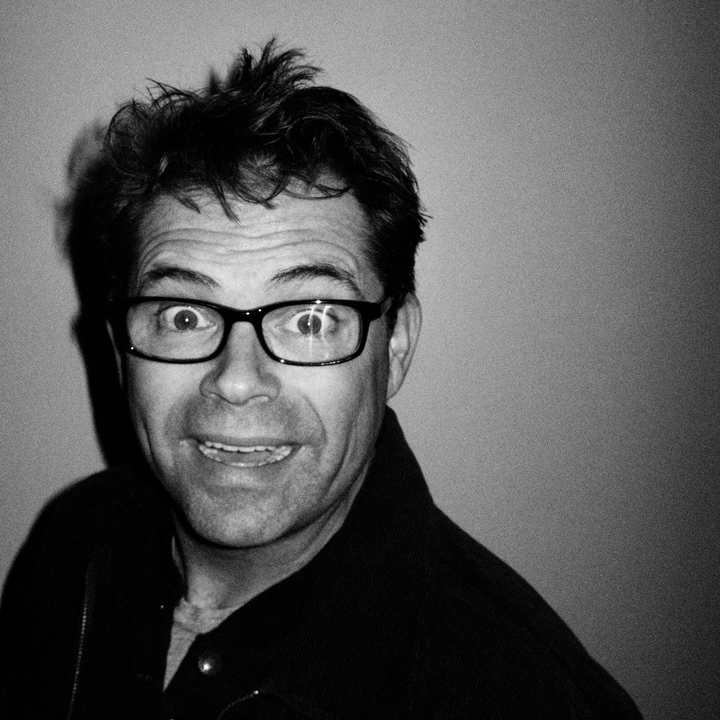
Dana Gould, who voices Gex in the American release, wrote quotations for Gex and thought up different costumes for different levels.

In early 1997, Crystal Dynamics announced that they were working on a 3D sequel to Gex in the style of Super Mario 64. They originally intended to debut the sequel with the technology available at the time. Lead programmer Adrian Longland recalled: "It actually started as a 2D game and after three months we had a prototype with Gex jumping around and using this hover mechanic. Then E3 came along and suddenly it was, 'Okay, Crash Bandicoot shows you can do 3D graphics on the PlayStation and Mario 64 has this open world... let's put those two together for Gex!"

Rather than a grouping of polygons, Gex was built with a full skeletal system, with more bones than a real gecko, and a 'skin' stretched over-top to eliminate pop and tearing. This allows his mouth to move with the voiced dialogue.

The Simpsons made for a noteworthy inspiration for the comedy set-ups based upon the show's popular style of humor. Rob Cohen, a writer from The Simpsons, worked on the script for Gex: Enter the Gecko, particularly Gex's one-liners. The end result of the idea gave Dana Gould over 700 voice-overs for Gex, while giving the character different costumes in order to suit the mood of the levels. When the game was ported to the Nintendo 64, over 500 voice-overs were cut due to the much lower storage capacity of cartridges as compared to CDs, leaving the Nintendo 64 version with roughly 100 samples. Since the game uses a MIDI soundtrack, no compromises were necessary for porting the music to the Nintendo 64. When Gould was being interviewed for the game, he explained how Gex in the third dimension differed from other platform games at the time, saying, "The character's natural God-given abilities lend themselves extremely well to designing 3D gameplay." Gould reprised the role of Gex in the game for the American market, although the British version featured the voice of Leslie Phillips instead.

It can give a game a certain charm, like the quips in Banjo-Kazooie. With Gex, though, it was hard to see where the humour fell. We had all these lines from Dana Gould, thousands of them, and we had to take out hundreds because we didn't want to offend this famous person or risk getting sued by this company... we scratched out about half! It would have been way funnier if we'd just left them all in.

— Adrian Longland, Retro Gamer

The designers put heavy emphasis on variety in the levels, to both give each world a different feel and help the player find their way around by creating recognizably unique landmarks.

In mid-1997 Crystal Dynamics signed an agreement for Midway to publish the game for the PlayStation and Nintendo 64.

== Release ==
Gex: Enter the Gecko was released on PlayStation in North America on February 24, 1998, and in Europe on April 3, 1998. A Nintendo 64 version retitled Gex 64 was released in North America on August 26, 1998, and in Europe on February 26, 1999. A Microsoft Windows version was released in North America on September 30, 1998, and in Europe that same year.

In Japan, the console version was ported and published by Bandai under the name Spin Tail (スピンテイル, Supin Teiru) on September 10, 1998.

Limited Run Games announced Gex Trilogy, a compilation release of the three console games emulated through Limited Run's Carbon Engine. The compilation was released for Nintendo Switch, PlayStation 5, Windows and Xbox Series X/S on June 16, 2025.

== Reception ==
Reception

Aggregate score
Aggregator	Score		
Aggregator	N64	PC	PS
GameRankings	61%	N/A	82%

Review scores
Publication	Score		
Publication	N64	PC	PS
CNET Gamecenter	4/10	N/A	9/10
Computer Gaming World	N/A	3.5/5	N/A
Electronic Gaming Monthly	5.5/10 (Note: In Electronic Gaming Monthly's review of the Nintendo 64 version, one critic gave it 6/10, two others gave it each a score of 5.5/10, and the other gave it 5/10.)	N/A	8.5, 8/10. 8.5/10, 8.5/10 (Note: Four critics from Electronic Gaming Monthly gave the PlayStation version each a out of ten.)
Famitsu	N/A	N/A	23/40
Game Informer	7.75/10	N/A	9.25/10
GameFan	N/A	N/A	87%, 85%, 91% (Note: Three critics in GameFan gave their own individual scores)
GameRevolution	B	N/A	A−
GameSpot	4.7/10	N/A	6/10
IGN	5.7/10	N/A	8/10
N64 Magazine	59%	N/A	N/A
Next Generation	N/A	N/A	3/5
Nintendo Power	7.5/10	N/A	N/A
Official U.S. PlayStation Magazine	N/A	N/A	3.5/5
PC Zone	N/A	82%	N/A
Game World Navigator	N/A	6.6/10	N/A
Strana Igr	N/A	N/A	7/10

The PlayStation version received favorable reviews, while the Nintendo 64 versions received mixed reviews, according to the review aggregation website GameRankings.

Critics almost unanimously described the levels as extremely well-designed, varied, and expansive. Dan Hsu of Electronic Gaming Monthly (EGM) said that ninety percent of what made Gex: Enter the Gecko fun was the level design with its wealth of imagination and diverse, humorous settings. IGN said the variety of objectives in each level was what set the game above most platformers. The graphics were also uniformly praised, with Jeff Gerstmann of GameSpot describing the overall look and frame rate as "about as close to Mario 64 as you'll ever get on a PlayStation" and Hsu's co-reviewer John Ricciardi commenting that "Gex's gorgeous graphics really exemplify just how far the PS has come since its release. Loads of beautiful textures, seamless animation, great lighting effects – the game is just a joy to look at." Famitsu gave it a score of 23 out of 40.

Response to the virtual camera was more mixed. IGN and GamePro both hailed it as a major step forward for 3D gaming cameras, while EGM reviewers remarked that, while the virtual camera was a valiant effort and could be made to work, it still was annoying at times. Next Generation, while similarly noting that the problems with camera angles in 3D gaming had yet to be solved by any game and that the developers had at least made an effort at a fix, felt that these ongoing problems in Gex: Enter the Gecko by themselves made it impossible to wholeheartedly recommend the game.

While the majority of reviewers praised the game's humor and personality, Gerstmann found the jokes so lame that they dragged the entire game down to a mediocre level. He added that "You can turn the commentary down or off, but considering that the game's entire selling point is based around these pathetic one-liners, you kind of feel obligated to leave them on." IGN had a much more positive overall assessment: "In the end, Gex is a surprising amount of fun, and gamers will like it because of its off-beat humor, large levels and great replay value."

GamePro called the PlayStation version "A must-own for platform fans" and gave it a 4.5 out of 5 for control and a perfect 5 in every other category (graphics, sound, and fun factor). The magazine later said of the Nintendo 64 version, "Clean 3D worlds and humorous sounds complete the experience, though you should be wary of a few hiccups with the game's controls. All told, if you enjoyed Mario 64 and Banjo-Kazooie, Gex is worth considering as your next purchase." (Note: GamePro gave the Nintendo 64 version two 4.5/5 scores for graphics and fun factor, and two 3.5/5 scores for sound and control.)

Game.EXE said that it lacked attention to detail and care. A Game World Navigator reviewer praised the graphics, noting that the backgrounds are detailed, but noticed that the monsters have few polygons. The reviewer complained about the bad behavior of the camera, but eventually concluded that the game is worth playing. Dmitriy Estrin, reviewer of a Strana Igr magazine, commented on the graphics, saying that the "developers skillfully managed the resources available to them", but he also noticed that the game had "too much simplicity in all aspects of the gameplay".

AllGame gave the PlayStation version four-and-a-half stars out of five, saying, "In conclusion, Gex: Enter the Gecko is a surprising amount of fun. From its vast and complex level design with humor-ridden gameplay, there is something for everyone. Anyone looking for the next Super Mario 64 or an incredibly good PlayStation platformer need look no further -- it is money well spent." Edge gave the same console version seven out of ten, saying, "While Gex 3D is possibly the best free-roaming 3D platformer for the PlayStation, the game's design is ultimately bereft of real inspiration."

Upon the PC version's initial release, USA Today gave the game 4 stars out of 5.

The PlayStation version was a finalist for the AIAS' inaugural Interactive Achievement Awards (now known as the D.I.C.E. Awards) for "Console Game of the Year" and "Console Action Game of the Year", both of which went to GoldenEye 007.
