= Crash 'N Burn (1993 video game) =

1993 video game

- North American cover art
- Developer: Crystal Dynamics
- Publisher: Crystal Dynamics
- Director: David Burke
- Producer: Mark Wallace
- Designer: Mark Cerny
- Programmers: Bill Mitchell; Bill Willis
- Artists: Cyrus Lum; Steve Kongsle
- Writer: E. Daniel Arey
- Composer: Burke Trieschmann
- Platform: 3DO
- Release: NA: October 4, 1993; JP: March 26, 1994
- Genres: Racing, vehicular combat
- Mode: Single-player

Crash 'N Burn is a 1993 racing/vehicular combat video game developed and published by Crystal Dynamics for the 3DO. The game was the launch title for the system and was included as a pack-in game with Panasonic's original 3DO console.

== Gameplay ==
Gameplay screenshot

In Crash 'N Burn, players assume the role of any one of six cyberpunks, each equipped with a unique car and a deadly supply of weapons. Full-motion videos of the racers are accessible in between races, in which each character flaunt their skills and insult their opponents with death threats. The game has rally and tournament modes with a total of 30 tracks designed for one player.

== Synopsis ==
The game is set in the year 2044 AD.

== Development and release ==
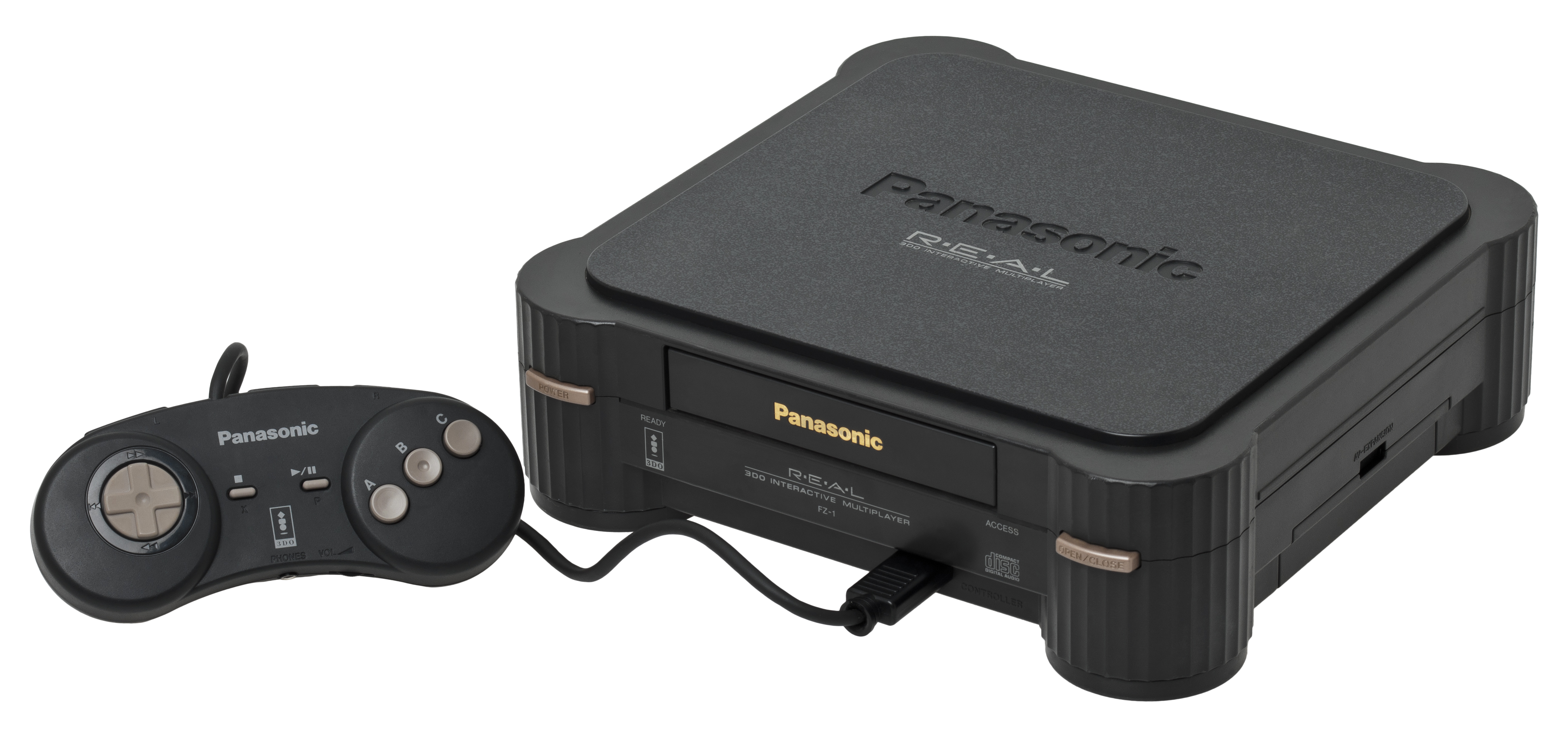
Crash 'N Burn was developed as the launch title for the 3DO platform (pictured: a Panasonic model).

Crystal Dynamics was formed on July 8, 1992, by Sega veterans Judy Lange, Madeline Canepa, and Dave Morse. Crystal was the first licensed developer for 3DO, a gaming hardware platform simultaneously funded by Kleiner Perkins. Mark Cerny joined the company, but he left to work for Universal Interactive Studios. In 1993, Strauss Zelnick, president of 20th Century Fox's film studio, was hired to run Crystal Dynamics. This made national news and helped to touch off the frenzy of multimedia investments of the mid-1990s. A 1993 editorial in Electronic Gaming Monthly declared that "the hottest new video game company on the upscale scene is definitely Crystal Dynamics."

Crash 'N Burn was conceived and produced by Mark Wallace and developed by Crystal Dynamics, with Bill Mitchell and Bill Willis as lead programmers and Mark Cerny as designer. Its development team required a small number of artists, including Steve Kongsle. The project was directed by David Burke and E. Daniel Arey was responsible for writing the script used for the product. Burke Trieschmann acted as a composer for the game's score.

The launch of the 3DO in October 1993 received a great deal of attention in the press as part of the "multimedia wave" in the computer world at the time. Return Fire, Road Rash, FIFA International Soccer and Jurassic Park Interactive had been slated for launch releases but were pushed to mid-1994 due to the developers' struggles with the sophisticated hardware. The 3DO Company also made continued updates to the console hardware almost up to the system's release, which resulted in a number of third-party titles missing the launch date and in some cases by less than a month, because the developers were not left enough time to fully test them on the finalized hardware. Its only software available at launch was Crash 'N Burn. Panasonic also failed to manufacture an ample supply of the console in time for launch day, and as a result most retail stores only received one or two units. By mid-November, it had sold 30,000 units.

In an interview shortly after The 3DO Company dropped support for the system, Trip Hawkins pointed out that it was essentially a lack of coordination between the company, Panasonic and the console's software developers which had led to it launching with only one game ready.

== Reception ==
Reception

Review scores
Publication	Score
AllGame	4/5
Consoles +	95%
Edge	8 / 10
Electronic Gaming Monthly	7 / 10
Famitsu	19 / 40
GamePro	16.5 / 20
Génération 4	96%
Hyper	82%
Video Games (DE)	75%
Entertainment Weekly	B+
Game Zero Magazine	79.0 / 100

Award
Publication	Award
GameFan (1993)	Best Driving Game (3DO)

Electronic Gaming Monthly gave the game a 7 out of 10. They described it as "a complex and exciting game once you get into [it]", but felt that it was not a strong enough game to sell a system as expensive as the 3DO.

GamePro praised the game as having the best racing game graphics ever seen in a home system, and also complimented the striking cast of characters, the variety of tracks, and the shopping feature. However, they criticized the lack of multiplayer and the relative shallowness of the racing gameplay (in particular that cars cannot get into crashes), and concluded it to be "a good, not a great, ride."

Crash 'N Burn received the Best Driving Game award from GameFan's 1993 Megawards.

== Legacy ==
Due chiefly to the unexpectedly slow growth of the next generation gaming market, Crystal Dynamics's massive expansion in its early years failed to pay off. In 1996 new CEO Ted Ardel announced the company was cutting one third of its workforce and stepping aside as a publisher to focus strictly on games development. For several months the company functioned without a president, with Ardel managing the day-to-day operations until Rob Dyer was promoted to president on April 4, 1997.

After Crash 'N Burn, Crystal Dynamics would later become known for developing the Legacy of Kain and Gex series of video games, as well as later entries in the Tomb Raider franchise, starting with the 2006 title Tomb Raider: Legend.
