= Dana Gould =

American stand-up comedian (born 1964)

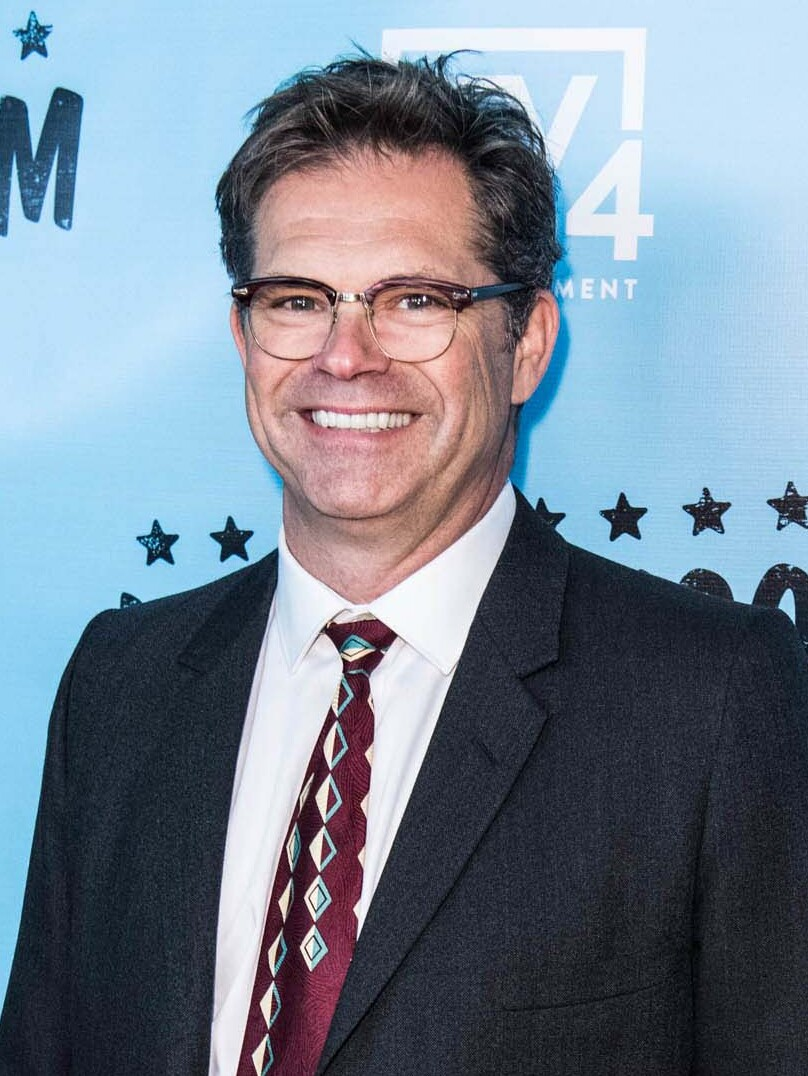
- Gould in 2018
- Born: August 24, 1964 (age 62); Hopedale, Massachusetts, U.S.
- Notable work: Gex; Writer and producer for The Simpsons
- Spouses: Sue Naegle (m. 2000; div. 2015) Kat Gould (m. 2022)
- Children: 3

Comedy career
- Years active: 1982–present
- Medium: Stand-up; television
- Website: danagould.com

Dana Gould (/ˈɡuːld/; born August 24, 1964) is an American stand-up comic, actor, writer, and voice artist who has been featured on HBO, Showtime, and Comedy Central. He voiced the titular character in the Gex franchise, and he wrote for The Simpsons between 2001 and 2007.

== Early life ==
Gould was born in Hopedale, Massachusetts on August 24, 1964, the fifth of six children.

== Career ==
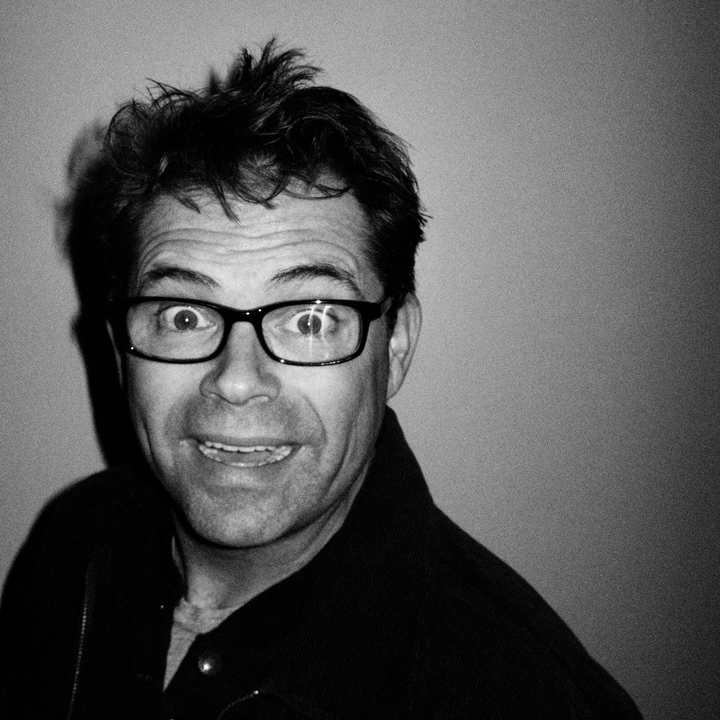
Gould in 2012

Gould began performing comedy onstage at age 17. After high school, he studied communications and theatre at Framingham State College, but after a year he moved to San Francisco to pursue a career in comedy. It was there he, along with fellow comedian Alex Reid, founded the San Francisco Comedy Condo in 1986.

Gould wrote and performed on The Ben Stiller Show; one such sketch features Gould as Otto, Cupid's twisted brother, whose arrows convince a young man to fall madly in love with an elderly woman. Another series of sketches features a heavily disguised Gould as Wilford Brimley advertising "Grady's Oats" (a parody of Brimley's Quaker Oats advertisements). In one, he speaks of his Uncle Ray's hobby of dressing in a pink taffeta gown and filling his panties with oatmeal; in another, he brandishes a revolver through the window at children. He also appeared in an episode of MADtv as Newt Gingrich and on one episode of Seinfeld ("The Junk Mail") as "Fragile" Frankie Merman, Jerry's childhood friend. He co-created and was executive producer on Super Adventure Team. In addition, Gould's stand up material was featured in Comedy Central's animated series Shorties Watchin' Shorties.

In 1998, Gould appeared in the episode "Supermarket Story" of The King of Queens.

Gould wrote for The Simpsons for seven years (2001–2007) and served as co-executive producer on seasons 14 through 18 (2002–2007). During his time with the show, Gould provided voice work on three episodes, including a 2005 episode on which he provided the voice of Don Knotts as Barney Fife – an impression that originated in his stand-up routine. Though Gould left the show to focus on his own screenwriting, he has returned three times to voice characters.

Gould had a featured cameo in Girls Will Be Girls, in which he played a hit-and-run victim who admits to his alcohol problem after having a desperate one-night stand with aging C-list actress Evie Harris, the other driver in the car accident. He was also featured in The Aristocrats, where, among other commentary, he presents an Amish version of the eponymous joke. His short films, Last Man On Earth, Break On Through With J.F.K., A Night On Java Island, and Soul Mates are also available for download on his site. Except for the last, all feature Gould in acting roles. 2009 saw the release of his new stand up special, "Let Me Put My Thoughts In You" on Shout! Factory.

Gould provided the voice for the title character in the U.S. versions of the Gex video game series and the U.K. version of the first game. Gould, with his frequent writing partner Rob Cohen, wrote the majority of the jokes for the games. Gould also voiced Hi Larious in Father of the Pride.

He was a regular contributor to the Adam Carolla radio show where he did impressions of Huell Howser. He appears occasionally on The Adam Carolla Show podcast. The first episode of Gould's own podcast The Dana Gould Hour was made available on iTunes on January 31, 2012. Recurring guests include comedians like Eddie Pepitone, and each episode revolves around a singular theme. Currently, a new episode of The Dana Gould Hour is released about every two months.

In 2010, he appeared in live action on the Family Guy episode "Brian Writes a Bestseller."

In 2013, Gould appeared with Melinda Hill and Scott Shriner in an episode of the web series Romantic Encounters. He also frequently performs live shows with comedian Arden Myrin as "The Tinkle Twins."

In 2014, Gould participated as a comedian on Playboy's "Foursome: Walk of Shame" where he joined other comedians in making fun of the program's contestants.

In 2016, Gould created the IFC comedy horror series Stan Against Evil, featuring the talent of John C. McGinley, Janet Varney, and Nate Mooney. Gould also appears as the character Kevin, a quirky gravedigger and love interest of Stan's daughter Denise.

Since 2021, Gould has starred in Hanging with Doctor Z, a talk show on YouTube reminiscent of The David Letterman Show, Space Ghost Coast to Coast, and The Tonight Show Starring Johnny Carson, among others.

== Personal life ==
Gould lives in Los Angeles. In 2000 he married Sue Naegle, former President of HBO Entertainment. The couple separated in 2014 and divorced in 2015. They have three daughters. Gould remarried in 2022 to Kat Aagesen, a writer and co-editor of the defunct website, malt-review.com.

== Discography ==
- Funhouse (Stand Up! Records) [Record / CD: 1998]
- Let Me Put My Thoughts In You (Shout! Factory) [DVD / CD: 2009; Record 2014]
- I Know It's Wrong (New Wave Dynamics) [CD: 2013]
- Mr. Funny Man (Kill Rock Stars) [MP3: 2017]
- Perfectly Normal (800 Pound Gorilla/Super Nice Guys) [MP3: 2025]

== Filmography ==
=== Television ===
Year	Title	Role	Notes
1992	The Ben Stiller Show	Various characters	Recurring role
1993	Doug	Various voices	Recurring role
1996	The Nanny	Josh Bassin	Episode: "The Taxman Cometh"
1996	Roseanne	Chip	Episode: "Hoi Polloi Meets Hoiti Toiti"
1996	Sabrina the Teenage Witch	Monty	Episode: "A Girl and Her Cat"
1996	Ellen	Mike	2 episodes
1997	Seinfeld	Frankie Merman	Episode: "The Junk Mail"
1997	The Love Bug	Rupert	TV film
1997	Working	Jimmy Clarke	Main role
1998	Super Adventure Team	Chief Engineer Head (voice)	Main role
1998	The King of Queens	The Guy	Episode: "Supermarket Guy"
1999	Dr. Katz, Professional Therapist	Himself (voice)	Episode: "Snow Day"
2000	Clerks	Various voices	2 episodes
2002, 2005, 2007, 2012, 2016, 2020	The Simpsons	Various voices	6 episodes
2004	Father of the Pride	Hi Larious (voice)	Episode: "Rehabilitation"
2010	True Jackson, VP	N/A	Episode: "Tru Disaster"
2010	Family Guy	Himself (live-action sequence)	Episode: "Brian Writes a Bestseller"
2011	Parks and Recreation	Guy Who Asks for Mort (uncredited)	Episode: "The Bubble"
2012	The High Bar	Himself	Episode: "Dana Gould on Rage"
2013	Maron	Himself	Episode: "Sex Fest"
2013	Anger Management	Todd	Episode: "Charlie and the Airport Sex"
2013	Wendell and Vinnie	School Principal	Episode: "Big Dogs & Bicycles"
2013	Wendell and Vinnie	Mr. Middleton	Episode: "First Dances & Last Chances"
2013	Mob City	Tug Purcell	Recurring role
2016	Mighty Magiswords	Norman (voice)	Recurring role
2016	Stan Against Evil	Kevin	Recurring role
2019	Creepshow	Henry Quayle	Episode: "Skincrawlers"
2024	Ted	Priest	Episode: "Ejectile Dysfunction"; Also writer and consulting producer

=== Film ===
Year	Title	Role
1996	My Fellow Americans	Sandwich Guy at Book Convention
1999	Mystery Men	Squeegee Man
2003	Girls Will Be Girls	Jeff
2003	Dumb and Dumberer: When Harry Met Lloyd	Mr. Moffitt
2015	Tales of Halloween	Boris ("This Means War" segment)
2015	Southbound	Raymond Kensington
2015	Being Canadian	Himself
2017	The Problem with Apu	Himself

=== Video games ===
Year	Title	Role
1995	Gex	Gex
1998	Gex: Enter the Gecko	Gex
1999	Gex 3: Deep Cover Gecko	Gex

=== Web ===
Year	Title	Role
2023	Gex Trilogy - Official LRG3 Reveal Trailer	Gex (voice)

== Crew work ==
- Creepshow - Writer ("Night of the Living Late Show")
- Gex - Writer
- Gex: Enter the Gecko - Writer
- Parks and Recreation - Consulting Producer
- Stan Against Evil - Creator, Executive Producer, Writer
- Super Adventure Team - Creator, Writer
- The Simpsons - Writer ("Homer the Moe", "Poppa's Got a Brand New Badge", "C.E. D'oh", "The President Wore Pearls", "Goo Goo Gai Pan", "Bart Has Two Mommies", "I Don't Wanna Know Why the Caged Bird Sings"), Producer (2001), Supervising Producer (2001–2002), Co-Executive Producer (2002–2007)
- Ted - Writer
