= Dave Morse (executive) =

American technology executive (1943–2007)

- Born: April 15, 1943
- Died: November 2, 2007 (aged 64)
- Employer(s): Amiga; Tonka Toys; Epyx; Crystal Dynamics

David Shannon Morse (April 15, 1943 – November 2, 2007) was an American technology executive. He was the cofounder of Amiga. In 1982, he left Tonka Toys (where he was Vice-President of Marketing) and became the Chief Executive Officer at Hi Toro, Inc., which he co-founded and which later that year morphed into Amiga, Inc.

He led Amiga through the development of the Lorraine Project (a codename inspired by David's wife Lorraine), which ultimately became the Amiga 1000 computer. In the 1980s, he was a software manager at Epyx, a video game developer and publisher where he helped to create the Atari Lynx, being credited with designing the graphics chip. In 1992, Morse would help co-found Crystal Dynamics with Judy Lange and Madeline Canepa, a video game developer famous for their extensive library.
