= Gex 3: Deep Cover Gecko =

1999 video game

- North American PlayStation cover art
- Developer: Crystal Dynamics (Note: Ported to Nintendo 64 by Gratuitous Games)
- Publishers: Eidos Interactive; Crave Entertainment (Nintendo 64)
- Director: Glen Schofield
- Producers: Sam Player; Jeffrey Zwelling
- Designer: Christopher Tremmel
- Programmer: Adrian Longland
- Artists: Scott Anderson; Billy Wardlaw; Amy Bond; Bruce Straley
- Writers: Robert Cohen; Ken Daly; Scott Steinberg; Andrew Bennett
- Composers: John Baker; Jim Hedges; Burke Trieschmann
- Series: Gex
- Platforms: PlayStation, Nintendo 64
- Release: PlayStation: NA: March 23, 1999; EU: April 10, 1999; Nintendo 64: NA: September 28, 1999; EU: July 24, 2000
- Genre: Platform
- Mode: Single-player

Gex 3: Deep Cover Gecko (Note: Titled Gex: Deep Cover Gecko in Europe) is a 1999 platform game developed by Crystal Dynamics and published by Eidos Interactive for the PlayStation. It is part of the Gex video game series, and was released in 1999, followed by ports for the Nintendo 64. Its protagonist, Gex, is a wisecracking, pop culture enthusiast voiced by Danny John-Jules in the UK and European releases and comedian Dana Gould, reprising his role from former Gex games, for the American release. The gameplay is set in Gex's secret hideout, Mission Control a overworld, which is overseen by Gex's butler, Alfred the Turtle. Playboy model Marliece Andrada plays Gex's kidnapped companion, Agent Xtra, the only live-action character, who is featured in brief full-motion video sequences on the PlayStation version. The plot follows Gex's return to the Media Dimension to rescue Agent Xtra from Rez, Gex's arch-nemesis from the previous games.

Gex 3 was conceived as a sequel to 1998's Gex: Enter the Gecko and incorporated unused elements of the game's design into Gex 3. Advancements in the utilization of available technology allowed Gex 3 to feature a set of bigger levels, more on-screen characters, different textures, and a retooled camera system over its predecessors that maximizes gameplay improvements with consideration to the hardware limitations of the time. Certain aspects from the original Gex were brought back as well, such as the addition of secret levels and bug collectibles. A 2D game titled Gex 3: Deep Pocket Gecko was released for the Game Boy Color in late 1999 which used the same plot and themes as Deep Cover Gecko.

== Gameplay ==
Gex interacts with Alfred the Tortoise in the hub world of Gex 3.

Gameplay remains similar to Gex: Enter the Gecko, with the addition of certain vehicles, such as a tank, a camel, and a snowboard, as well as swimming and gliding abilities available in certain levels. Like Enter the Gecko, new stages are unlocked by collecting TV remotes. Unlike Enter the Gecko, in which Gex can obtain a variety of themed collectibles throughout a level (e.g. skulls, TNT plungers, carrots, TVs, and police plates), Gex can only collect bugs, the same collectible from the original Gex. Upon receiving certain power-ups, Gex gains the ability to spit fire and ice. When losing a life, Gex retains only the amount of bugs collected up to the latest checkpoint; if the level has no checkpoint, Gex starts at zero. Due to Gex 3's limitation of 100 bugs per level, collecting the required bugs is more difficult than in Enter the Gecko. Similar to the first Gex game, collecting footprint icons will increase Gex's energy. Unlike the first game, Gex retains the energy (eight hits total) after collecting 100 footprints. Levels are accessed via a more expansive hub, with more areas unlocked as the player collects remotes from each of the levels. During bonus stages, players can unlock and control three alternate characters, Rex, Cuz, and Alfred. Collecting all 50 remotes (including by defeating Rez) unlocks a special ending showcasing the development team, though this is absent in the UK release due to that version having a language selection screen.

== Synopsis ==
=== Characters ===
Four new characters appear in this sequel. Agent Xtra is a live-action female government spy whom Gex must help rescue from the clutches of Rez. Gex is also joined by his faithful butler, Alfred the Tortoise, who is a slight character reference to Bruce Wayne's butler Alfred Pennyworth. Alfred helps around and maintains Gex's secret lair which is known as "Mission Control". Alfred can be found in parts of most levels and tail whipping him gives useful advice. The two last characters are Rex, a red Dinosaur whom Gex unfroze from a block of ice in the "Holiday Broadcasting" channel, and Gex's cousin Cuz whom Gex rescues from gangsters in the "Gangster TV" channel.

=== Plot ===
While watching the news, Gex (who is now a wealthy secret agent) discovers that his partner and love interest Agent Xtra, now the head of the "TV Terrorist Defense Unit", has been reported missing. Xtra herself manages to contact Gex, and tells that she is in media dimension and informs him that Rez has returned once again and kidnapped her to get to him and attack Gex's secret island cave. In place of this introduction cutscene in the Nintendo 64 version, Alfred narrates the story through voice-over while posters and news articles appear in a newsflash style on screen with the boss battle music playing in the background. The interaction that also occurs between Gex and Xtra also differs in both versions: Gex and Xtra communicate during the same cutscene for the PS1 while in the Nintendo 64 version, Gex is already in the Mission Control headquarters and Xtra communicates with him on the screen of his control console.

Through his secret lair, Gex returns to the Media Dimension and circumnavigates numerous television channels with help from his butler Alfred and in the process frees and befriends Rez's prisoners, Rex and Cuz. Together, they find Rez and challenge him to a final battle. In the aftermath, Rez is destroyed once and for all, and Gex saves Xtra.

In the PlayStation version's ending, as Xtra tells Gex of her time in the Media Dimension, Alfred attempts to warn Gex of a world emergency, but Gex ignores him and turns the computer off, before proceeding to join Xtra in his bedroom where they make love offscreen; the Nintendo 64 version instead ends with Alfred stating that he purchased tickets for Gex and Xtra to go on a relaxing cruise, leaving him in charge of Gex's island.

== Development ==
Crystal Dynamics wanted Gex 3, the sequel to Gex: Enter the Gecko and the third game in the Gex series of platform video games, to raise the bar for focusing more on its story than the series' previous entries did. They also wanted to further put emphasis on the title character's personality by giving him "over-the-top animations", according to Crystal Dynamics' Product Marketing Manager, Chip Blundell. Several of the in-game mechanics used in levels were concepts that were thought of during the development of Gex 3D, but could not be included due to issues with time constraints. Lead Designer Chris Tremmel wanted the gameplay of Gex 3 to hearken back to the series' initial roots as a 2D side-scrolling platformer. To achieve this, he included side-scrolling minigames in addition to the main platforming parts, in order to make level missions less monotonous. According to Tremmel, most people who had played Gex 3D were not entirely invested in going out of their way to locate all of the collectibles in each stage as they were with other collectathon platformers like Super Mario 64 and Banjo-Kazooie; thus, the developers made three core collectibles that stay consistent throughout the entire game and significantly aid the player in completing it. The hub world used to access stages was also retooled from the previous game and changed from an empty environment with several doors leading to levels to be more like a level in itself with items and secrets hidden within it.

With Gex 3, the developers tried to push the limits of the PlayStation's hardware further than they had with Gex 3D. For instance, they made the game's levels bigger than they were in the previous entry, having found a way to increase level sizes by one-fifth and include more enemies per stage while maintaining a high framerate. Textures also make use of environment mapping, something which Tremmel initially did not think that the PlayStation could smoothly handle; according to him, he suggested using it to the programmers as a joke, not thinking that they could legitimately pull it off with the hardware limitations of the PlayStation but found that the programmers had already begun working on implementing it the next day. The technique was used primarily for metal surfaces, such as certain enemies and Gex's shield and metallic armor that he wears at points in the game. A particular area of focus for Crystal Dynamics was improving the game's 3D camera system, which was frequently criticized in Gex 3D for being glitchy and difficult to use at times. Rather than including a multitude of camera options, they opted simply to feature a single system which was simple and did not work against the desires of the player.

Agent Xtra was played by actress Marliece Andrada, best known for starring in the TV show Baywatch.

== Release ==
A 2D game titled Gex 3: Deep Pocket Gecko was released for the Game Boy Color in late 1999. It uses the same narrative and level themes as Deep Cover Gecko. Limited Run Games re-released Deep Cover Gecko as part of their Gex Trilogy for Nintendo Switch, PlayStation 5, Windows and Xbox Series X/S on June 16, 2025.

== Reception ==
Reception

Aggregate score
Aggregator	Score	
Aggregator	N64	PS
GameRankings	65%	77%

Review scores
Publication	Score	
Publication	N64	PS
AllGame	3.5/5	4/5
CNET Gamecenter	6/10	9/10
Electronic Gaming Monthly	6/10	7.5/10, 7.5/10, 7.5/10, 8/10
EP Daily	4/10	N/A
Game Informer	7.75/10	8/10
GameFan	(T.R.) 68% 70%, 68%, 60% (Note: In GameFan, three critics gave the game each a unique rating.)	78%, 80%, 75% (Note: In GameFan three reviewers each gave the game three unique overall ratings.)
GameRevolution	B−	N/A
GameSpot	5.3/10	6.7/10
IGN	5.8/10	8.1/10
N64 Magazine	22%	N/A
Next Generation	N/A	2/5
Nintendo Power	7.5/10	N/A
Official U.S. PlayStation Magazine	N/A	3.5/5

The PlayStation version of Gex 3: Deep Cover Gecko received favorable reviews, while the Nintendo 64 versions received mixed or average reviews, according to the review aggregation website GameRankings. The N64 version was criticized for stuttering frame rates despite "PlayStation-esque graphics", not taking advantage of the analog stick, and failing to compare to the 3D platformer competition on the Nintendo 64 such as Super Mario 64. Whether the player slightly presses the joystick forward or presses it all the way, Gex runs full speed ahead. Running on the less powerful PlayStation, Gex 3 was rated higher due to less 3D platformer competition and impressive graphics. Next Generation said of the PlayStation version, "In the end, Gex 3 is a passable game – barely. Everything about the title is cookie cutter from beginning to end." The Daily Mirror called the game "much bigger and better with greater depth of gameplay. [...] And, thankfully, the jokes and sarcasm are still there."

Dan Elektro of GamePro said of the PlayStation version, "Don't doubt that Gex 3 is fun to play. Fans of the platform hero will enjoy the multiple hours of action. But the focus in this sequel is on addition, not innovation—which is fine, but Gex 4 will need more." (Ironically, there was never a plan for a sequel nor a Gex 4.) (Note: GamePro gave the PlayStation version 4.5/5 for graphics, and three 4/5 scores for sound, control, and fun factor.) Boba Fatt later said of the Nintendo 64 version in one review, "Vets of Gex 2 might've expected more novelty, but Gex 3 is a solid, spunky platformer with hours of challenge and gallons of personality—and it's far better than the likes of Tonic Trouble or Glover." (Note: GamePro gave the Nintendo 64 version three 4/5 scores for graphics, control, and fun factor, and 4.5/5 for sound in one review.) iBot said of the same console version in another review, "If you are a fan of the series and love his jokes and biting wit, then this Gex is just right for you. But overall, Gex 3: Deep Cover Gecko is just an average 3D platformer that delivers less than average fun." (Note: GamePro gave the Nintendo 64 version 4/5 for graphics, 3/5 for sound, and two 3.5/5 scores for control and fun factor in another review.)
