= German Entrepreneurial Index =

GEX is a German stock market index based owner-dominated companies, which have been listed on the German stock exchange less than ten years.

Owner domination entails that members of the executive and supervisory boards or their families hold between 25 and 75 percent of the voting rights in the company. Many small and medium-sized companies are led by their owners and the Index focuses on this segment. On average, companies on the Index have been listed for approximately five years. Thus, the GEX index serves as an indicator for the price development of small and medium-sized companies on the exchange. The number of listed companies that qualify has fallen from around 120 to 35 between 2010 and 2012.

== See also ==
- DAX
- MDAX
- ÖkoDAX
- SDAX
- TecDAX
