= Mad Dash Racing =

2001 video game

- North American cover art
- Developer: Crystal Dynamics (Note: Additional work by Nixxes Software.)
- Publisher: Eidos Interactive
- Designers: Noah Hughes; Christopher Tremmel; James Stiefelmaier
- Platform: Xbox
- Release: NA: November 6, 2001; EU: March 14, 2002; JP: May 30, 2002
- Genre: Racing
- Modes: Single-player, multiplayer

Mad Dash Racing is a racing video game for the Xbox developed by Crystal Dynamics and published by Eidos Interactive. It was released 10 days before the Xbox launched in November 2001. The video game features the voices of Billy West and Charles Martinet.

== Plot ==
On a little island known as Trem Land, a crazed wizard named Hex plans to take over the world using red meteor chunks to power his device. He can't do this on his own so he forms a contest and invites a group of miscellaneous characters so that they can race each other across the island in search of the seven red meteor chunks. In return, Hex initially offers the winner a brand-new pig, until Sid (one of the playable contestants) states that according to the contract they signed, the winner would receive Hex's Magical Scepter. Hex reluctantly agrees and the contest begins. The player can play as several different characters, which fall into 3 separate categories of Bashers, Gliders, and Dashers - all of which have unique abilities that can allow access to short cuts throughout the map. As the player progresses, more of the characters can join the team and become playable.

After completing several races and collecting all seven red meteor chunks, Hex's real plan of world domination becomes clear and the player must race Hex to his machine and destroy it. Upon doing so, Hex's machine is hit with a blast from the aforementioned magical scepter and the device explodes as Hex's plans are foiled. Initially no one is harmed in the explosion, but as Hex begins to remark about getting out unscathed, his magical scepter falls nearby and transforms him into a pig. Immediately following this, Hex's minions place a 1st prize blue ribbon on the now pig-Hex and carry him and his scepter to the player's character as their prize. Upset, Hex vows that he will be back just before the game's end credits roll.

== Gameplay ==
Mad Dash Racing features 15 playable characters, including Spanx the weasel, who would later reappear as the main player character in Whiplash (2003), and the eponymous hero of the Gex series. The characters are split into four different groups: Bashers, Dashers, Gliders, and Bosses. Bashers are able to break through certain objects, Dashers are able to gain quick boosts and run up steep slops, Gliders are able to jump farther or glide, and Bosses are able to have all the powers. It is very similar to Sonic R and Running Wild. Players can collect 10 green meteor chunks and become a Tribrid. As a Tribrid players can have Bashers, Dashers and Gliders with just using one character. There are 9 tracks all together in the game. Different tracks have different settings. Numerous licensed music tracks were featured in the game.

== Reception ==
Reception

Aggregate score
Aggregator	Score
Metacritic	65/100

Review scores
Publication	Score
Electronic Gaming Monthly	5/10 (Note: Three critics of Electronic Gaming Monthly gave the game each a score of 5/10.)
EP Daily	7/10
Famitsu	28/40
Game Informer	6/10
GameSpot	7/10
GameSpy	78%
GameZone	8/10
IGN	7.7/10
Next Generation	3/5
Official Xbox Magazine (US)	7.3/10

The game received "mixed" reviews according to the review aggregation website Metacritic. NextGen said that the game is a hardcore cart racer despite its misleading cute and fuzzy look. In Japan, where the game was ported for release on May 30, 2002, Famitsu gave it a score of 28 out of 40. Dan Elektro of GamePro said, "for all its shiny visuals and four-player races, Mad Dash Racing elicits nothing more than a noncommittal shrug. The stars are animals without an anima, and as a result, it's just a rental." (Note: GamePro gave the game two 4/5 scores for graphics and control, 3/5 for sound, and 2.5/5 for fun factor.)

== See also ==
- Gex, the main character of which is unlockable in Mad Dash Racing.
- Whiplash, a spin-off of Mad Dash Racing featuring Spanx the Weasel.
