= Milo's Astro Lanes =

1998 video game

- North American box art
- Developer: Player 1
- Publishers: NA: Crave Entertainment; EU: Interplay Entertainment
- Director: George Weising
- Producers: Holly A. Hirzel; Mike Arkin
- Designer: Player 1
- Programmers: Marcus Goodney; Kevin Va Hunt
- Artists: Mike Fisher; Ivan Enriquez
- Composer: David Javelosa
- Platform: Nintendo 64
- Release: NA: November 24, 1998; EU: July 25, 1999
- Genre: Sports
- Modes: Single-player, multiplayer

Milo's Astro Lanes is a 1998 bowling game for the Nintendo 64 developed by Player 1 and published by Crave Entertainment. The game takes place in a space setting where there are intergalactic bowling alleys. It makes use of the Rumble Pak and the Controller Pak. The latter must be used for the former to be used.

== Features ==
A screenshot of a player bowling during Milo's Astro Lanes gameplay.

- 6 playable characters
- 12 galactic lanes
- 6 types of bowling balls
- Multiplayer modes including 4 player simultaneous mode
- Variety of specials available

== Reception ==
Reception

Aggregate score
Aggregator	Score
GameRankings	69%

Review scores
Publication	Score
Consoles +	40%
Electronic Gaming Monthly	3/10, 3.5/10, 3.5/10, 4.5/10
GamePro	4/5
GameSpot	5.5/10
IGN	6.1/10
N64 Magazine	38%
Nintendo Power	5.3/10
Official Nintendo Magazine	52%
N64 Gamer	4/10

The game was met with average reception, as GameRankings gave it a score of 69% based on only four reviews.

Although there were plans made by Capcom to bring Milo's Astro Lanes to Japan under the title Space Bowler Milo (スペース・ボーラー マイロー) in December 1999, they were eventually canceled due to continuously low sales of the Nintendo 64 in the country.
