= Mitsuo Senda =

Japanese voice actor (1940–2023)

Mitsuo Senda (千田 光男, Senda Mitsuo; March 1, 1940 – February 25, 2023) was a Japanese voice actor from Hokkaido who was affiliated with 81 Produce.

Senda died from heart failure on February 25, 2023, at the age of 82.

== Filmography ==
=== Television animation ===
- Time Bokan (1975) - Ninja
- Sherlock Hound (1984) - Smiley
- YuYu Hakusho (1992) - Seiryu
- Kaleido Star (2003) - Mr. Kenneth
- 07-Ghost (2007) - Miroku
- Naruto (2006) - Shinayakana
- Naruto: Shippuden (2009) - Gamamaru
- Needless (2009) - Ishiyama
- Zetman (2012) - Gorō Kanzaki
- Maho Girls PreCure! (2016) – Hook
- Beyblade Burst (2017) - Zoro / Raul Comas

=== Dubbing ===
==== Live-action ====
- Lance Henriksen
  - The Terminator (1987 TV Asahi and 1992 VHS editions) (Detective Hal Vukovich)
  - Jagged Edge (1989 TV Asahi edition) (Frank Martin)
  - Aliens (1988 TBS edition) (Bishop)
  - Stone Cold (Chains Cooper)
- Harry Dean Stanton
  - Alien (1992 TV Asahi edition) (Brett)
  - Christine (1990 TV Asahi edition) (Detective Rudolph "Rudy" Junkins)
  - Pretty in Pink (Jack Walsh)
  - Twin Peaks: Fire Walk with Me (Carl Rodd)
- Klaus Kinski
  - Creature (Hans Rudy Hofner)
  - Commando Leopard (1987 TV Tokyo edition) (Silveira)
  - Code Name: Wild Geese (1988 TV Tokyo edition) (Charlton)
- Barry Otto
  - The Punisher (Shake)
  - Mr. Nice Guy (1999 NTV edition) (Baggio)
  - Love's Brother (Father Alfredo)
- 48 Hrs. (1990 NTV edition) (Albert Ganz (James Remar))
- The Abyss (Lieutenant Hiram Coffey (Michael Biehn))
- Ace Ventura: When Nature Calls (Vincent Cadby (Simon Callow))
- The Adventures of Buckaroo Banzai Across the 8th Dimension (Secretary of Defense McKinley (Matt Clark), John Gomez (Dan Hedaya))
- Battle of the Commandos (1975 NTV edition) (Capt. Kevin Burke (Thomas Hunter))
- Best in Show (Gerry Fleck (Eugene Levy))
- The Bodyguard (Greg Portman (Tomas Arana))
- Born on the Fourth of July (1993 TV Asahi edition) (Charlie (Willem Dafoe))
- Clear and Present Danger (Colonel Félix Cortez (Joaquim de Almeida))
- The Crow (T-Bird (David Patrick Kelly))
- Das Boot (1983 Fuji TV edition) (Bootsmann Lamprecht (Uwe Ochsenknecht))
- The Driver (1980 NTV edition) (Teeth (Rudy Ramos))
- End of Days (Thomas Aquinas (Derrick O'Connor))
- Extreme Prejudice (1988 Fuji TV edition) (Deputy Cortez (Marco Rodríguez))
- Felon (Gordon (Sam Shepard))
- Firewall (Arlin Forester (Alan Arkin))
- Gattaca (German (Tony Shalhoub))
- Hard Times (1981 TV Asahi edition) (Le Beau (Felice Orlandi))
- The Hunt for Red October (1993 TBS edition) (Commander Bartolomeo Vito Mancuso (Scott Glenn))
- In the Mouth of Madness (Sutter Cane (Jürgen Prochnow))
- Just Cause (Blair Sullivan (Ed Harris))
- The Killer (Sgt. Tsang Yeh (Kenneth Tsang))
- King Ralph (Lord Percival Graves (John Hurt))
- Last Action Hero (The Ripper (Tom Noonan))
- Last Man Standing (1998 TV Asahi edition) (Gas station attendant (Raynor Scheine))
- The Long Riders (1988 TV Asahi edition) (Charley Ford (Christopher Guest))
- NCIS (Dr. Donald "Ducky" Mallard (David McCallum))
- The NeverEnding Story (1987 TV Asahi edition) (Teeny Weeny (Deep Roy))
- Pearl Harbor (Husband E. Kimmel (Colm Feore))
- Platoon (1989 TV Asahi edition) (Sergeant O'Neill (John C. McGinley))
- Raiders of the Lost Ark (1993 DVD edition) (Colonel Hermann Dietrich (Wolf Kahler))
- Red Heat (1990 TV Asahi edition) (Abdul Elijah (Brent Jennings))
- Ronin (Seamus O'Rourke (Jonathan Pryce))
- Scrooged (Brice Cummings (John Glover))
- Tucker: The Man and His Dream (Eddie Dean (Frederic Forrest))
- The Warriors (1982 NTV edition) (Snow (Brian Tyler))
- Welcome to Sarajevo (Michael Henderson (Stephen Dillane))
- X-Men (Senator Robert Kelly (Bruce Davison))
- X2 (Senator Robert Kelly (Bruce Davison))
- Zodiac: Signs of the Apocalypse (Harry Setag (Christopher Lloyd))

==== Animated ====
- Watership Down (Blackberry)
