= Gex (video game) =

1995 video game

- North American 3DO box art
- Developer: Crystal Dynamics (Note: Ported to PlayStation and Sega Saturn by Beam Software and ported to Windows by Kinesoft.)
- Publishers: Crystal Dynamics; Microsoft (PC)
- Producer: Lyle Hall
- Designer: Justin Norr
- Programmers: Gregg Tavares; Evan Wells
- Artist: Mira F. Ross
- Writers: Robert Cohen; Dana Gould
- Composers: Greg Weber; Steve Henifin
- Series: Gex
- Platforms: 3DO, PlayStation, Sega Saturn, Windows
- Release: April 7, 1995: 3DO; NA: April 7, 1995; UK: May 12, 1995 PlayStation; NA: December 18, 1995; EU: April 5, 1996 Saturn; NA: December 18, 1995; EU: April 5, 1996 Windows; NA: November 7, 1996; EU: 1996
- Genre: Platform
- Mode: Single-player

Gex is a 1995 side-scrolling platform game developed and published by Crystal Dynamics for the 3DO. It was followed by ports for the PlayStation and Sega Saturn developed by Beam Software, and a Windows version published by Microsoft. It was a pack-in game for Panasonic models of the 3DO later in the console's life. It is the first in the Gex series of video games, and introduces players to the title character, a wisecracking, television-obsessed gecko voiced by comedian Dana Gould, who must venture through the "Media Dimension" and defeat Rez, the overlord of the dimension who wants to make Gex into his new network mascot.

Gex was created by Lyle Hall in 1993 shortly after he had joined Crystal Dynamics, and initially followed a movie stuntman named Gecko X before being retooled at the advisory of lead programmer Gregg Tavares. The game's lead character was intended as a mascot for the developer who could rival the likes of other immensely popular platformer characters – primarily Mario and Sonic the Hedgehog. Initially intended for completion in June 1994, and later in September of that year, development of the game took 21 months, with time constraints and a limited development team leading to numerous production difficulties. Several features were cut because of a necessity to complete the game on time, but some of these features were later re-added by a team of developers who programmed several other secret features into the game.

It was released in April 1995 to largely positive reviews from critics; particular praise was aimed at Gex's unique platforming abilities and Gould's voice work as the character. The 3DO version of the game managed to sell over a million copies, making it one of the system's better-selling games. Two sequels were later released, titled Gex: Enter the Gecko and Gex 3: Deep Cover Gecko, with Gex becoming Crystal Dynamics' mascot for a short time.

== Gameplay ==
Gex in a horror level. The jumping killer tomato is an enemy. The features in the display bar, from left to right, are the player's score, number of lives, number of flies, and health.

Gex is a side-scrolling platformer that follows the title character Gex, an anthropomorphic, television-obsessed gecko who must travel through the "media dimension" and defeat the game's antagonist, Rez. Gex must traverse through 24 levels contained in five different TV channels which act as game worlds (accessed through a world map), each filled with platforming stages and ending with a boss stage. The goal of each stage is to explore and locate hidden television remotes which are used to unlock more levels. The original 3DO version of the game allows players to save their progress and resume from where they left off; all other versions use a password system. The player unlocks passwords or is granted a save opportunity by beating a boss stage or finding video tapes hidden in certain levels. Every level contains a hidden portal that leads to a bonus level, the perfect completion of which earns the player a piece of the Planet X remote. Collecting every piece of this remote allows them to reach Planet X, an optional secret world.

Many of Gex's default abilities take advantage of his special characteristics as a gecko. In addition to being able to walk, run, and jump, he can attach himself to walls and ceilings and crawl along them using the suction pads on his feet, allowing him to reach higher areas. Gex primarily attacks with his tail; he can whip it in a full circle to defeat enemies, activate switches, and deflect projectiles. He can coil it into the shape of spring to bounce off enemies and other objects. Levels contain assorted collectible power-ups which can provide Gex with several different abilities, such as enhanced speed, invulnerability, and one of many different types of projectiles that can be launched from his mouth. Gex can obtain and utilize these power-ups by lashing his gecko tongue out and consuming them; alternatively, these items can be tail whipped to replenish lost health at the expense of the item's primary effect. Gex's health is represented by three "hit paws", and he loses one whenever he is hit by an enemy or a hazard. If the player loses all of their hit paws, then they lose a life. The number of hit paws can be extended to six by finding a certain power-up. The player begins the game with three lives, though more can be earned by collecting a hundred Golden flies in a level. Losing all lives causes the game to be over, forcing players to restart from the beginning (or from the last saved in the 3DO release).

=== Plot ===
Gex, a young anthropomorphic gecko, lives by himself watching television and eating snacks in his mansion in Maui, Hawaii, which he acquired after inheriting a large sum of money following the death of his great-uncle. While looking for a good show to watch after doing some "nude funkercising", he consumes a passing housefly. This house fly turns out to be a small undercover drone being controlled by Rez, the overlord of the Media Dimension. Rez uses the droid to "bug" Gex, and pulls him into the Media Dimension through the TV set, intending to use him as the network's new mascot character. To escape, Gex needs to traverse the Media Dimension and find remote controls that he could use to destroy the TV sets blocking his exit back to the outside world.

Gex fights his way through the Media Dimension, finding remotes, and defeating Rez's henchmen along the way, before eventually defeating Rez himself using some of the tyrant's drones against him. Upon returning home, Gex resumes watching his TV, wondering what was on HBO.

== Development ==
The concept for Gex was created by Lyle Hall, who began work on the project shortly after joining the newly-formed Crystal Dynamics in 1993. Hall wanted the game to "take advantage of both the graphics prowess and the CD audio capabilities" of Panasonic's 3DO console, intending to create a 2D platform game starring "the coolest character I could come up with". It was created with the intention of a new mascot in mind, with Crystal Dynamics pushing for a character who could rival the likes of other gaming icons such as Mario and Sonic the Hedgehog. Initially, the development team consisted of four people; Hall, who served as the game's producer, Mira Ross and Susanne Dougherty as artists, and Gregg Travers as the lead programmer (later on, Justin Knorr was hired as the game's lead designer). The game initially centered around a Hollywood film stunt performer named "Gecko X" who needed to help save his contracted film studio from going bankrupt at the volition of the antagonist, Karl Chameleon. Each stage was themed around a film genre (e.g. a level inspired by Western films) and would begin by showing stock footage from a vintage film of that genre. The player would then traverse the level and perform "stunts" along the way, with the player's performance dictating the amount of money the film would earn at the box office and how well the studio would do. The concept was eventually nixed at the suggestion of Travers, who argued that placing the levels in such realistic settings would lead to a lack of sensible design structure, and a new, more fantastical concept was brainstormed, in which a new villain, named Rezull, would capture Gex and bring him into a "TV Land" where he would have to escape by collecting magical TV remotes and fighting Rezull's armada of "video warriors" made of TV static. Gex's voice was provided by comedian Dana Gould, who wrote all of the character's dialogue.

During its production, Gex went through various development challenges due to schedule issues. Work on the game began in late 1993, with a development deadline of June 1994. The development team initially came up with six different worlds themed around varying TV channels, including a horror world and a science fiction world. Each world was given three distinct sets of art design that could be used to create unique levels; for instance, the horror world had a haunted house set, a graveyard set, and a "Mode 2" set for a vertically scrolling level. While working on the game, they found that developing game art for Gex was far harder than it had been with 16-bit video games, as the expanded 32-bit memory in combination with the storage capabilities of a compact disc meant that far more art could be made. With two artists working on the game's assets, a single in-game level took around two months to complete. Because Crystal Dynamics' two other 3DO games being developed at the time, Crash N Burn and Total Eclipse, only required a small number of artists, Panasonic was hesitant in hiring additional artists to the game's development team, presuming it to be unnecessary. Because of this limited development team, the game took longer to produce than anticipated. Eventually, the company began bringing other artists in to work on designing characters, including Steve Kongsle (who had been working on Crash N Burn and designed Gex).

In the middle of the game's strenuous development, a number of Gex's developers - among whom were programmer Danny Chan and Evan Wells, as well as various people from outside of development - joined together to secretly program several features into the game. The unused sci-fi art from the game was used to make a series of secret levels. A small 2D shooting game programmed by Wells as his Senior project at Stanford University was added into the game, as was a small minigame made by scriptor Susan Michelle. These additions were kept in unbeknownst to the company until they were discovered through playtesting. The additions were kept in the game. The "secret team" also programmed a hidden extended end credits sequence which featured photos of the staff, as well as a wide array of concept art, sketches and storyboards, which came to last a total of 18 minutes after being completed. This sequence could be accessed by completing all of the sci-fi levels as well as the rest of the game. At one point in development, one of the stages designed by Knorr was edited without his permission. The level had several parts with bugs that Knorr requested to be fixed. Since the game was eight to nine months late of its initial completion deadline, rather than working around the bugs, the company removed these parts in order to ship the game sooner. Knorr was infuriated by this, and in response, left a hidden message in one of the levels teaching the player a cheat code to get to the game's stage select (which contained over 80 level slots despite only 28 levels being in the game) and telling them to pick a specific stage, which contained the original version of this level. There, he hid three more messages, including one which disclosed the personal phone number of head of product development Madeline Canepa and telling the players to call her and "give her a piece of your mind and my mind too". This addition was ultimately found by playtesters, leading to the immediate firing of Knorr.

By June 1994, very little progress had been made on Gex, with less than half of the game complete. The multiple art sets were reduced to only one per level, and the Mode 2 section and the sci-fi world in its entirety were scrapped. The team hoped to have the game finished by September so that it could be released for the holiday season in December. However, by September, the game was still vastly incomplete, with unfinished level designs and no in-game audio, and by the end of 1994 it was clear that the game would still need extra time to be finished.

== Release ==
After around 21 months of development, Gex was released for the 3DO in North America on April 7, 1995, in Japan on April 21, 1995, and in the United Kingdom on May 12, distributed by BMG Interactive. It was also included later on in the 3DO's lifespan as a pack-in title bundled with certain units of the console. The game was later ported to the PlayStation and Sega Saturn, both of which were developed by Beam Software and released in North America on December 18, 1995, in Japan on March 29, 1996, and in Europe on April 5, 1996. In January 1996, Microsoft bought the worldwide rights for a personal computer version of Gex. The company released a Windows port on November 7, 1996. The game was later re-released on the PlayStation Store on November 6, 2009.

== Reception ==
Reception

Review scores
Publication	Score
AllGame	4/5 (3DO)
Electronic Gaming Monthly	9/10, 8.5/10, 8/10, 9/10 (3DO); 8.5/10, 8/10, 7/10, 8/10 (PS1, SAT)
Famitsu	6/10, 8/10, 6/10, 7/10 (SAT)
Game Informer	9.25/10 (PS1)
IGN	6.0/10 (PS1)
Next Generation	4/5 (3DO); 3/5 (PS1, SAT)
Maximum	2/5 (PS1)
Sega Saturn Magazine	62% (SAT)
PC PowerPlay	80% (PC)
CD Player	6/10 (3DO)

GamePro highly praised Gex, stating that he "sets high standards for all future 3DO platform-hoppers" and predicting that the character would reach popularity levels similar to Sonic and Mario. Next Generation called it "one of the most solid and enjoyable side-scrolling action games in a while." Electronic Gaming Monthly gave the game their "Game of the Month" award. The game was awarded "Best 3DO Game" at the 1994 Consumer Electronics Show by GamePro and "Best 3DO Game of 1995" by Electronic Gaming Monthly. In 1996, GamesMaster ranked the 3DO version 9th on their "The GamesMaster 3DO Top 10."

GamePro highly praised Gex's visuals, and wrote that it would "win a 3DO beauty pageant". Prior to release, GameFan's E. Storm called Gex's model "one of the best looking and animated characters that [they] have ever seen" and praised the game's environments and parallax scrolling; however, he also expressed disdain in the game's titular character dawning the only pre-rendered model out of all of the characters, although he admitted that they were still "drawn well for the most part." In a later set of reviews from the same publication following the game's release, reviewer K. Lee praised the mix of bitmapped graphics and SGI renders used for the sprites. The other 2 GameFan reviewers, Nick Rox and "Skid", expressed awe at the game's ability to extensively use parallax scrolling in spite of the 3DO's limited hardware.

Gameplay was deemed unique by many critics, who praised its integration of Gex's abilities as a gecko. Lee called Gex's gameplay mechanics "the icing on the cake" as well as praising the inclusion of game secrets. GamePro aimed particular praise towards Gex's ability to climb surfaces, saying that players could "get into the groove" of using the skill despite stating that it was initially frustrating trying to guess which walls were and were not climbable. A reviewer for Next Generation contested that Gex's wall climbing ability was "not completely unique" but that it nonetheless added an interesting dimension to the gameplay. Storm advised that the game controlled the best when playing using the 3DO's Goldstar controller.

Gould's in-game voiceover for Gex was highly praised. GamePro stated that it never became obnoxious due to the wide range of different one-liners present in-game. Storm called Gex's voice "the first time a game character has ever been given voice and personality that has actually turned out to be cool" and stated that the many written phrases suited his character. Skid felt that the vocals added to the game's enjoyability, while Rox wrote that they were mostly "hilarious... when you can hear them over the music and sound effects." In reviewing the PC version for PC PowerPlay, David Wildgoose wrote that Gex's "American slacker voice" would be viewed by players as either "cool or grating", although he admitted to personally not minding it. Lee praised the game's music, calling it "high quality."

The game's ports received varying levels of praise. The four reviewers of Electronic Gaming Monthly reviewed the PlayStation and Saturn versions, commenting that the audio and cinemas in both versions were cleaned up compared to the 3DO original. They especially praised the game's humor and solid platforming action. GamePro likewise stated that the PlayStation version had "cleaner graphics and smoother gameplay" than the 3DO version. They also remarked the Saturn version has "the same graphics, sound, and control that earned acclaim in the PlayStation version", and held it favorably above Bug!, another platform game for the Sega Saturn. IGN stated that the game was still as fun on the PlayStation than it was on the 3DO, despite noting that very few changes had been made. Next Generation's review of the Saturn port remarked that Gex was nowhere near as fresh as it was when it debuted on the 3DO, but still witty and fun. In a negative review of the game, Rob Allsetter commented in Sega Saturn Magazine that although the visuals and game flow were acceptable, they were both negated by the game's "utter predictability." Maximum gave the PlayStation version a mixed review, saying that the player character has a remarkable variety of abilities, but that the level design is often dull and frustrating. Wildgoose praised the PC port of the game, stating that it was still enjoyable despite calling it a "slightly aged console platformer".

Gex was one of the best-selling 3DO games, but the exact sales figures remain unclear. In July 1995, roughly a month before it became a pack-in game, its sales exceeded one million units according to GamePro and Electronic Gaming Monthly. Contradictory to this, an article in Next Generation cover-dated November 1995 says that the 3DO version had sold only 750,000 units worldwide. The PlayStation version sold over one million units.

== Sequels and legacy ==
The success of Gex produced two sequels, with the eponymous character becoming the recurring mascot for Crystal Dynamics. In 1998, Crystal Dynamics released a sequel to Gex called Gex: Enter the Gecko for the PlayStation and Nintendo 64, following Gex once again as he travels to defeat Rez. Unlike the first game, a 2D side-scrolling title, this game is a 3D platformer, playing in a vein similar to games such as Super Mario 64. A year later, Gex 3: Deep Cover Gecko was released, featuring Playboy model and Baywatch actress Marliece Andrada as a new character named Agent XTra who is captured by Rez.

Although Gex 3 was the last game in the Gex series to date, developer Square Enix, who holds the rights to the franchise, announced in 2013 that they would be holding a "Square Enix Collective" program in which they would give budding game developers opportunities to develop a new game in one of three different series – among which was Gex, alongside Fear Effect and Anachronox. The program began in 2015, with Square opening itself up to pitches from independent developers.

Limited Run Games announced Gex Trilogy, a compilation release of all three games emulated through Limited Run's Carbon Engine. The compilation was released for Nintendo Switch, PlayStation 5, Windows and Xbox Series X/S on June 16, 2025.
