= Gex (series) =

Platform video game series

- Logotype from the first game
- Genre: Platform
- Developer: Crystal Dynamics
- Publishers: Crave Entertainment; Eidos Interactive; Midway Games; Sony Interactive Entertainment; Square Enix
- Platforms: 3DO; Game Boy Color; Microsoft Windows; Nintendo 64; PlayStation; Sega Saturn
- First release: Gex; April 1995
- Latest release: Gex Trilogy; June 16, 2025

Gex is a platform game series, developed by Crystal Dynamics, that details the adventures of an anthropomorphic gecko named Gex. He has served as the mascot of Crystal Dynamics, appearing on their company logo for several years up until the year 2000. In the North American version, Gex is voiced by the comedian Dana Gould; the United Kingdom version features Gould as well as Leslie Phillips and Danny John-Jules as the voice of Gex. Gex was voiced by Mitsuo Senda in the Japanese release of the second game.

The Gex games are largely inspired by American TV culture, Gex contributing to the games with wise-cracking remarks laced with media and references to popular culture.

The PlayStation versions were rereleased under the PSone Classics banner on the PlayStation Network, Gex 3: Deep Cover Gecko on October 1, 2009, Gex on November 5, 2009, and Gex: Enter the Gecko on February 4, 2014, compatible with PlayStation 3, PlayStation Portable and PlayStation Vita. Additionally, Square Enix published Gex at GOG.com, a distribution platform for legacy games, on October 16, 2014. Limited Run Games released Gex Trilogy, a compilation of the PlayStation versions of all three games emulated through Limited Run's Carbon Engine, for Nintendo Switch, PlayStation 5, Windows and Xbox Series X/S on June 16, 2025.

== Plot ==
Gex is a gecko who has a passion for television, which makes him a target for the cybernetic being Emperor Rez. Emperor Rez is determined to overthrow the Media Dimension, the "world" of television.

In the first game, Rez, who is the overlord of the Media Dimension, kidnaps Gex to his world to use him as a network's new mascot character. However, he is defeated by Gex, who escapes back home.

In the second game, Gex, following 2 years of isolation, is recruited by government agents to take down Rez, who has returned to the Media Dimension. Gex, who also returns to the Media Dimension, later defeats Rez, who says that he is Gex's father, though it's unclear if Gex believes Rez's claim.

In the third game Gex, who is now a wealthy secret agent, discovers through the news that his partner and love interest Agent Xtra, now the head of the "TV Terrorist Defense Unit", has been reported missing. Xtra herself manages to contact Gex, and tells that she is in the Media Dimension and informs him that Rez has returned once again and kidnapped her to get to him and attack Gex's secret island cave. Gex transverses the Media Dimension a third time and defeats Rez for good, saving Agent Xtra in the process.

== Games ==
Aggregate review scores As of November 23, 2015.
Game	GameRankings
Gex	(3DO) 79.58% (PC) 71.00% (SS) 69.35% (PS1) 63.33%
Gex: Enter the Gecko	(PS1) 81.70% (N64) 60.50% (GBC) 57.00%
Gex 3: Deep Cover Gecko	(PS1) 77.20% (GBC) 70.60% (N64) 65.13%

=== Cancelled projects ===
A fourth Gex entry was in development for the PlayStation 2 and GameCube, but was canceled due to lack of interest from Eidos Interactive. Many of the ideas and aspects were later used for Whiplash for the PS2 with only concept art existing of the Gex 4 idea.

An unreleased PS1 prototype demo for a cancelled 2001 game referred to as Gex Jr. was leaked online in April 2022.

== Characters ==
- Gex - Gex is a smart-alecky, wise-cracking gecko who lives with his family and friends in Maui, Hawaii. He spends his days surfing, playing the ukulele, and throwing poi parties down on the beach with the local lady lizards. After his father's death, he begins watching mass amounts of TV to get over the tragedy. He eventually inherits over twenty billion dollars from his deceased great uncle and buys the world's largest television. He has his own island hideaway called the GEXCave located in the South Pacific. His catchphrase is "It's tail time!", due to his primary attack being tail whips. Gex is voiced by Dana Gould in all three installments in North America. The PAL (European and Australian game formats) versions feature three separate voice actors; Dana Gould in the original game, Leslie Phillips in the second game, and Danny John-Jules in the third game.
- Rez - Rez is a megalomaniacal, cybernetic entity, and the main antagonist of the series. His one true ambition is to control the entire Media Dimension and ensure the longevity of bad TV shows and Z-Grade movies. His entire essence is made up of Liquid Rez, liquid noise spread throughout the series. He also claims to be Gex's father. Rez is voiced by Bruce Robertson.
- Agent Xtra - Agent Xtra is Gex's crime-fighting partner, who also loves TV as well. She is kidnapped by Rez and communicates to Gex through video signals in mission control. She is portrayed in live-action sequences by Marliece Andrada.
- Alfred the Tortoise - Alfred is Gex's butler. He is a turtle who wears a bow tie and glasses. He provides Gex with constant help to defeat Rez. He is voiced by Marc Silk.
- Rex - Rex is a small, red Tyrannosaurus rex and Gex's prehistoric ancestor. He was seen frozen in a block of ice at the "Holiday Broadcasting" channel that Gex can melt to set him free.
- Cuz - Cuz is Gex's overweight cousin and seems to be a leopard gecko. He is saved by Gex after being locked in a cage by the gangsters on the "Gangsters TV" channel.
- Gex's Father - Gex's Dad works for NASA by doing various research projects. He and ten other volunteers are chosen to eat tapioca pudding in zero gravity, though their rocket explodes due to a Band-Aid floating into one of the fuel tanks, killing them. His mother later moves to California, and after gaining money inherited from Gex's great-uncle, Charlie, she purchases 51 percent ownership in NASA, fires everyone, sells the rockets to some third world countries, and converts Mission Control into "Space Monkeys", a theme restaurant featuring robotic dancing chimps wearing spacesuits. In the novel, Rez claims that he is Gex's real father and became the way he was after the explosion, whether this is true or not is unclear, although Rez makes the same claim in Gex: Enter the Gecko but with a different story (saying he fell into a scrapheap while trying to get free cable).

== Future ==
In February 2015, Square Enix announced that they would allow developers to create games based on some of their old Eidos intellectual properties via the Square Enix Collective project, including the Gex intellectual property. In December 2021, Square Enix filed a new Gex trademark in the European Union, and subsequently in February a new trademark for Gex in Japan. Three months later, Embracer Group made an agreement to purchase Crystal Dynamics and Eidos IPs from Square Enix, which did not include Gex.

== Legacy ==
Gex appears as an unlockable character in Mad Dash Racing and the North American and European versions of Hot Shots Golf 2.

The titular character has been associated with the hyperpop duo 100 gecs, where he was featured on the cover of their self-titled debut EP.

In June 2022, a fan animation of the game was uploaded to YouTube by FlippinDingDong. It was presented as a tape recording of a 1990s animated series that aired on Toon Disney. The clip features Gex's characteristic one-liners. The animation would later become viral on YouTube. FlippinDingDong would later provide animation for both the reveal trailer and the LRG 2024 trailer for Gex Trilogy.

Gex appears in Astro Bot as an unlockable bot found in the game's Winter Wonder level, released in a free update on December 12, 2024.
