= Robert Cohen (writer) =

Canadian comedy writer and director

Rob Cohen
- Born: Robert Cohen; Calgary, Alberta, Canada
- Occupations: Writer, director
- Years active: 1990–present
- Spouses: Janeane Garofalo (m. 1992; div. 2012); Jill Leiderman

Robert Cohen is a Canadian comedy writer and director. Cohen's writing career has covered many TV formats, from sketch to multi-camera, single-camera and animation. He has also written multiple times for the Academy Awards and Emmy Awards.

== Early life ==
Cohen was born to a Jewish family in Calgary, Alberta, where he attended the Calgary Hebrew School.

== Career ==
Cohen has written for The Simpsons, The Wonder Years, The Ben Stiller Show, and The Big Bang Theory.

He won a Primetime Emmy Award for his work on The Ben Stiller Show. His career as a TV comedy writer has covered every format, from multi-camera and single-camera, to sketch and animation. Cohen has also written for and produced on multiple Emmy Award, Academy Award and MTV Movie Award shows.

== Personal life ==
Cohen is married to Jimmy Kimmel Live! producer Jill Leiderman. Upon their engagement, he learned that he had been legally married to his ex-girlfriend, actress Janeane Garofalo, for the last twenty years, after what they had believed to have been a "joke wedding" in Las Vegas in 1991. They had both thought the marriage was not binding unless it had been filed at a local courthouse. The union was dissolved in 2012.

== Awards ==
Year	Nominee / work	Award	Result
1993	The Ben Stiller Show	Emmys "Outstanding individual achievement in Writing in a Variety or Music Program"	Won
2004	In recognition of extraordinary courage shown in... efforts to advance animation organizing	Robert Metzler Award	Won
2016	Being Canadian	Writers Guild of America Award "Best Documentary Screenplay"	Nominated
2016	Best Director - Short Form Film	2016 Webby Award	Won
2017	"Primetime Emmy Awards"	Writers Guild of America Award "Best Writing for a Variety Special"	Nominated
