= Karima Adebibe =

English actress and model (born 1985)

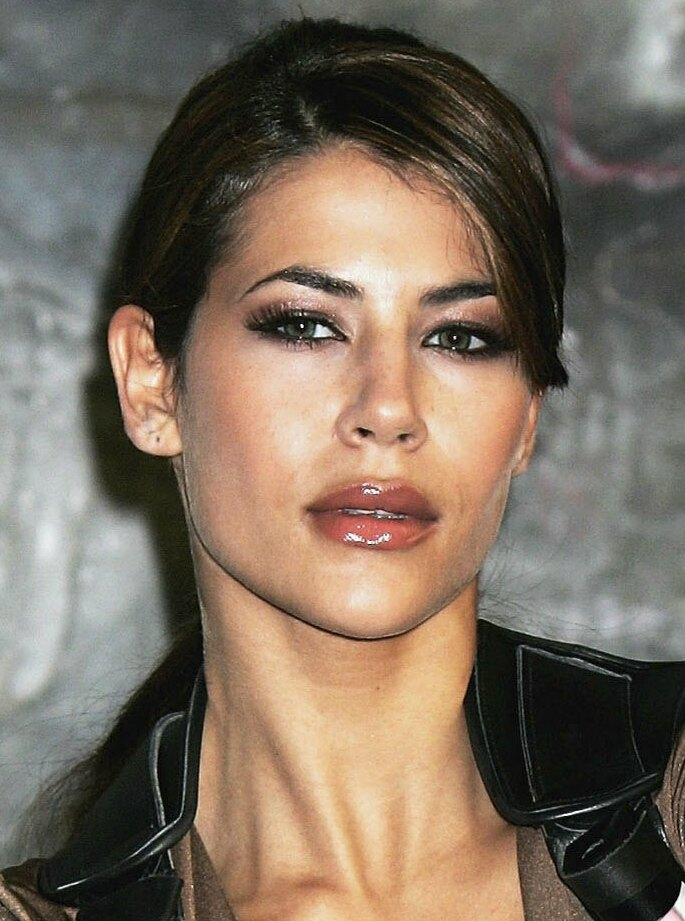
- Adebibe as Lara Croft in Warsaw, Poland, 2006
- Born: 14 February 1985 (age 41); Bethnal Green, London, England
- Other name: Karima McAdams
- Occupations: Actress; model
- Years active: 2004–present
- Children: 1
- Modelling information
- Height: 5 ft 8.5 in (1.74 m)
- Hair colour: Dark brown
- Eye colour: Green

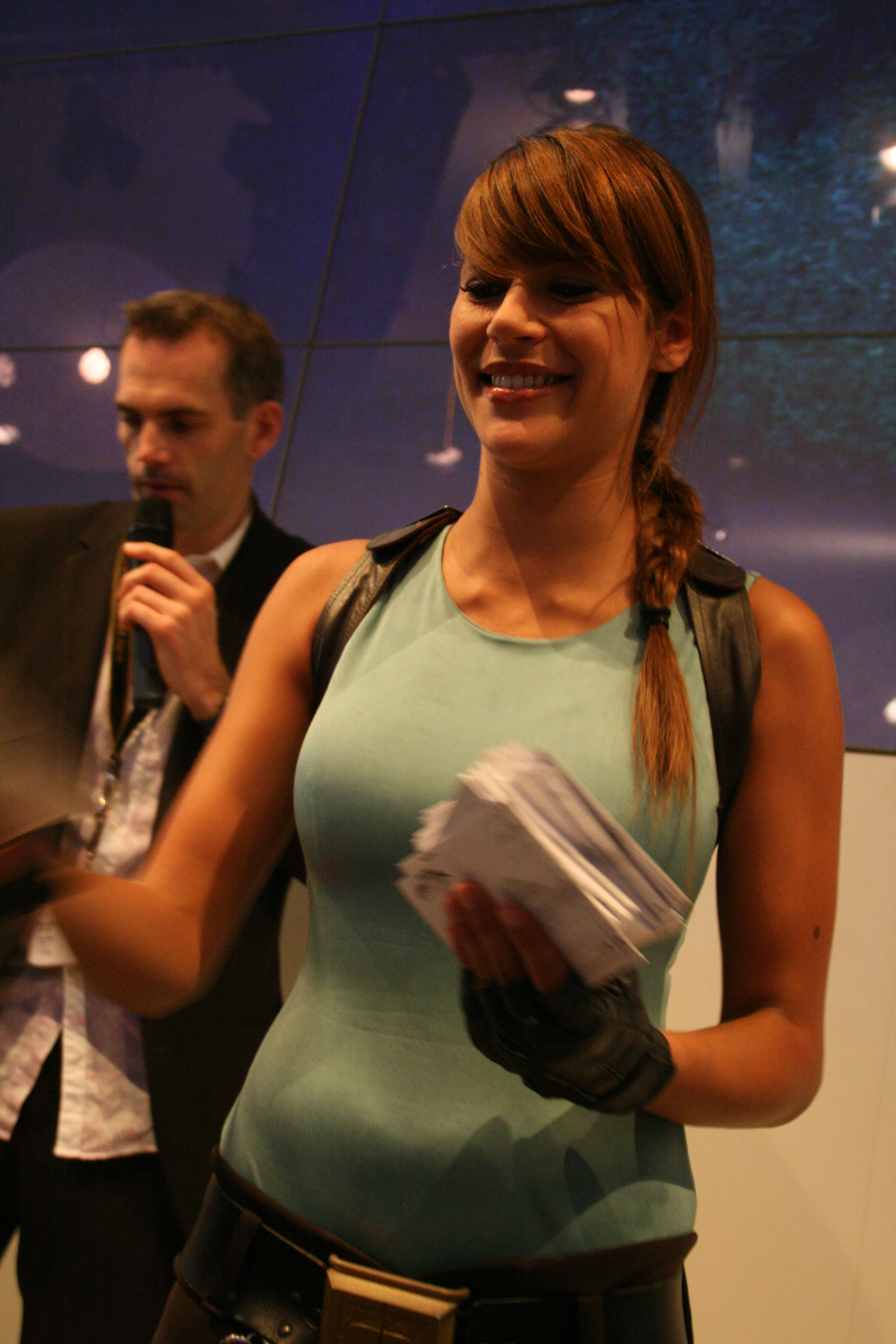
Adebibe in August 2007

Karima Adebibe (/ˈædbɪb/ AD-bib; also known as Karima McAdams; born 14 February 1985) is an English actress and model.

== Life and career ==
Adebibe was born in Bethnal Green, in Tower Hamlets, London, England but grew up in Tangier before moving back to the UK. She is of Irish, Greek Cypriot and Moroccan Berber origins.

Formerly a secretary, Adebibe was selected on 14 February 2006 to be the seventh model for Lara Croft in the video game series Tomb Raider. The role involved promoting the game series in character on television and radio, so she underwent training in Lara Croft's trademark skills, from martial arts to elocution. She retired from the role in 2008.

She had previously had a small role as a sacrificial maiden in the 2004 film Alien vs. Predator. She appeared in the film Frontier Blues in 2009.

In January 2021, she announced her pregnancy with her partner, rapper Professor Green. Their son was born later in 2021. The family lives in London.

== Filmography ==
=== Film ===
Year	Title	Role	Notes
2004	Alien vs. Predator	Sacrificial maiden	
2009	Frontier Blues	Ana	
2011	Sherlock Holmes: A Game of Shadows	Sush Club Maitre	
2015	The Leap	Freehaven hostess	Short film

=== Television ===
Year	Title	Role	Notes
2017	Vikings	Kassia	2 episodes (as Karima McAdams)
2017	Fearless	Miriam Attar	6 episodes (as Karima McAdams)
2018–2019	Deep State	Leyla Toumi	16 episodes (as Karima McAdams)
2020	Soulmates	Sarah Maddox	1 episode
2023	The Wheel of Time	High Lady Suroth	5 episodes (as Karima McAdams)
2024	Dune: Prophecy	Sister Nazir	2 episodes (as Karima McAdams)
2026	Hijack	Jess	7 episodes (as Karima McAdams)

Preceded by Jill de Jong	Lara Croft model 2006–2008	Succeeded by Alison Carroll
