= Amsterdam Heavy =

- Directed by: Michael Wright
- Written by: Michael Wright
- Produced by: Jason Rogan; Doug Marschke
- Starring: Michael Madsen; Alison Carroll; Fajah Lourens; Semmy Schilt; Alistair Overeem
- Cinematography: Arie Van Dam
- Edited by: Michael J. Rix
- Music by: Ray & Anita
- Production companies: Funny How Films; Paradigm Pictures
- Distributed by: Tombstone Distribution
- Release date: 2011
- Running time: 90 minutes
- Language: English

Amsterdam Heavy is a 2011 English action crime film written and directed by Michael Wright, and starring Michael Madsen, Jeroen Post, Alison Carroll, Fajah Lourens, Semmy Schilt and Alistair Overeem. It was shot in Amsterdam, Netherlands.

== Premise ==
The film tells the story of criminal "JD" who is on a relentless quest for revenge. He smuggles himself back to his hometown Amsterdam. Having arrived there, he goes on a rampage through the Dutch capital to find those who have betrayed him.

== Cast ==
- Michael Madsen as Martin Keele
- Dorien Rose Duinker as Zoe
- Alison Carroll as Monique
- Fajah Lourens as Agent Brandt
- Semmy Schilt as Himself
- Alistair Overeem as Himself
- Horace Cohen as Jansen
- Gokhan Saki as Himself
- Mimoun Ouled Radi as De Vries
- Jörgen Raymann as Dr. Sunil

== Music ==
Ray & Anita's single "Nothing 2 Lose" is the lead track for Amsterdam Heavy.

== Release ==
Amsterdam Heavy was released on DVD and Blu-ray Disc in 2011 in the United States. In 2012 it was released in other countries, including the United Kingdom, the Netherlands, Germany, China, Brazil, and France. The single disc DVD contains both full-screen and widescreen versions of the film. It also contains a Making of, Cast interviews and the music video of "Nothing 2 Lose" by Ray & Anita.
