= Jill de Jong =

Dutch actress (born 1982)

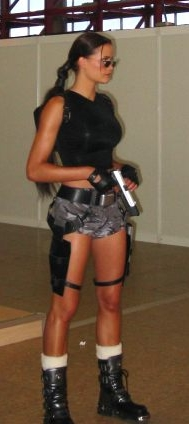
- Jill de Jong, 2003.
- Born: 17 February 1982 (age 44); Hoogeveen, Netherlands
- Modeling information
- Height: 1.83 m (6 ft 0 in)
- Hair color: Blonde
- Eye color: Green
- Website: https://www.jilldejong.com/

Jill de Jong, also known as Jildou de Jong (born 17 February 1982) is a Dutch fitness trainer, health coach, podcast host and former model and actress. Born in Hoogeveen, Drenthe, Netherlands, on 21 March 2002 she was selected by Eidos Interactive as the Lara Croft character model for the Tomb Raider video game series.

She began her career as a model at the age of fifteen after winning a modeling contest in the Netherlands. She went on to become a respected and successful top model, shooting TV and print campaigns for big brand names such as, Ralph Lauren, Escada, Redken, Izod, St. Yves, Fa shower gel, Calvin Klein, Dolce & Gabbana and L'Oréal in Europe and the United States.

In 2019, she published a cookbook titled Models Do Eat. De Jong lives and works in Los Angeles, California.

| Preceded by Lucy Clarkson | Lara Croft model 2002–2006 | Succeeded by Karima McAdams |
