= Lara Croft =

Fictional protagonist of Tomb Raider

- Tomb Raider character
- Lara Croft from Tomb Raider I–III Remastered in her signature outfit worn in many games
- First game: Tomb Raider (1996)
- Created by: Toby Gard
- Voiced by: Various: Shelley Blond (Tomb Raider, Unfinished Business, Reloaded); Judith Gibbins (Tomb Raider II & III, Reloaded); Jonell Elliott (The Last Revelation, Chronicles, The Angel of Darkness, Reloaded); Olivia DeLaurentis (Tomb Raider interactive game) (Note: Olivia DeLaurentis voiced a young Lara Croft in the Tomb Raider interactive game.); Keeley Hawes (Legend, Anniversary, Underworld, Lara Croft and the Guardian of Light, Lara Croft and the Temple of Osiris, Reloaded, Call of Duty: Modern Warfare II); Charlotte Sparey (Legend) (Note: Charlotte Sparey voiced a young Lara Croft in Tomb Raider: Legend.); Minnie Driver (Revisioned: Tomb Raider); Camilla Luddington (Tomb Raider 2013, Rise of the Tomb Raider, Shadow of the Tomb Raider); Harriet Perring (Rise of the Tomb Raider) (Note: Harriet Letting voiced a young Lara Croft in Rise of the Tomb Raider.); Francesca Aston (Shadow of the Tomb Raider) (Note: Francesca Aston voiced a young Lara Croft in Shadow of the Tomb Raider.); Abigail Stahlschmidt (Lara Croft: Relic Run); Alicia Vikander (Tomb Raider: The Live Experience); Emily O'Brien (Dead by Daylight); Hayley Atwell (The Legend of Lara Croft); Maggie Lowe (The Legend of Lara Croft) (Note: Maggie Lowe voiced a young Lara Croft in The Legend of Lara Croft.); Alix Wilton Regan (Legacy of Atlantis, Catalyst)
- Motion capture: Various: Heidi Moneymaker (Underworld); Camilla Luddington (Tomb Raider 2013, Rise of the Tomb Raider, Shadow of the Tomb Raider)
- Portrayed by: Angelina Jolie (Lara Croft: Tomb Raider, The Cradle of Life); Alicia Vikander (2018 film); Sophie Turner (TV series); Other: Rachel Appleton (Lara Croft: Tomb Raider; young); Emily Carey (2018 film; young); Maisy De Freitas (2018 film; young)

In-universe information
- Origin: London, England
- Nationality: English

Lara Croft is a fictional character and the main protagonist of the video game franchise Tomb Raider. She is presented as a highly intelligent and athletic English adventurer and archaeologist who ventures into ancient tombs and hazardous ruins around the world. Created by a team at British developer Core Design that included Toby Gard, the character first appeared in the video game Tomb Raider in 1996.

Core Design handled the initial development of the character and the series. Inspired by strong female icons, Gard designed Lara Croft to counter stereotypical female characters. The company modified the character for subsequent titles, which included graphical improvements and gameplay additions. American developer Crystal Dynamics took over the series after the 2003 sequel Tomb Raider: The Angel of Darkness was received poorly. The new developer rebooted the character along with the video game series by altering her physical proportions and giving her additional ways of interacting with game environments.

Lara Croft has further appeared in video game spin-offs, printed adaptations, a series of animated short films, feature films, and merchandise related to the series. The promotion of the character includes a brand of apparel and accessories, action figures, and model portrayals. She has been licensed for third-party promotion, including television and print advertisements, music-related appearances, and as a spokesmodel.

Critics consider Lara Croft a significant video game character in popular culture. She holds six Guinness World Records, has a strong fan following, and is among the first video game characters to be successfully adapted to film. Lara Croft is also considered a sex symbol, one of the earliest in the industry to achieve widespread attention. The character's influence in the industry has been a point of contention among critics; viewpoints range from a positive agent of change in video games to a negative role model for young girls.

== Characteristics ==
Lara Croft is depicted as an athletic woman with brown eyes and brunette hair, frequently kept in a plait or ponytail. The character's classic costume is a turquoise leotard, light brown shorts, calf-high boots, and tall white socks. Accessories include fingerless gloves, a backpack, a utility belt with holsters on either side, and two pistols. The video game sequels introduced new outfits designed for different environments, such as underwater and cold weather. In the later games, Croft wears a crop top, camouflage pants and black or light brown shorts. When exploring, she often carries two pistols, but has used other weaponry throughout the series. She is fluent in several languages.

Lara's backstory has changed dramatically over the course of the series. During the first era, beginning in Tomb Raider (1996), game manuals describe the character as the Wimbledon, London-born daughter of Lord Henshingly Croft (Lord Richard Croft in Legend and Survivor timelines). She was raised as a British aristocrat and betrothed to the fictitious Earl of Faringdon. Lara attended the Scottish boarding school Gordonstoun and a Swiss finishing school. At the age of twenty-one, she survived a plane crash, which left her stranded in the Himalayas for two weeks; the experience spurred her to shun her former life and seek other adventures around the world. Croft published books and other written works based on her exploits as a mercenary, big-game hunter, and master thief. These provided her with a replacement source of income after her father disowned her over her change in lifestyle.

During the second era, which began with Tomb Raider: Legend (2006), Lara's story was changed to be the daughter of archaeologist Lord Richard Croft, the Earl of Abingdon, and someone who was quickly identified as a highly talented individual while attending the Abingdon Girls School. The plane crash was changed to when Lara was nine years old, and with her mother, Amelia Croft. While searching for shelter, Lara and her mother took refuge in an ancient Nepalese temple, where Lara witnesses her mother vanish after tampering with an ancient sword. Her father later disappears in search of his wife. This spurs Lara on to seek the reason for her mother's disappearance.

The third era, established in Tomb Raider (2013), deviates from the original plot considerably. When Lara was young she travelled with her parents on many of their archaeological expeditions which helped to shape the woman she was becoming. It was on one of these expeditions that her mother, Amelia Croft, vanished and was presumed dead and when her father Richard presumably took his own life a few years later, she was then left in the care of Conrad Roth. Even though she inherited a vast fortune, giving her the means to attend Cambridge with ease, Lara chose to study at University College London. Though this was a much tougher choice, it helped her become more grounded and level-headed than she might otherwise have been. She also ended up meeting her best friend, Samantha Nishimura, during her time at UCL. It was because of Sam's free spirit and a wild streak that Lara was able to experience much more of London than just the universities and museums that she loved so much. After travelling the world, both Lara and Sam end up on an expedition to the Dragon's Triangle off the Japanese coast in search of the lost civilization of Yamatai. It is on this expedition that Lara is stranded on a remote island full of natural, human and supernatural dangers, which enables her to develop from an untested young woman to a survivor. After experiencing the supernatural powers of the ancient world, she comes to realise her father was right about his theories and her hunger for adventure awakens.

== Character development history ==
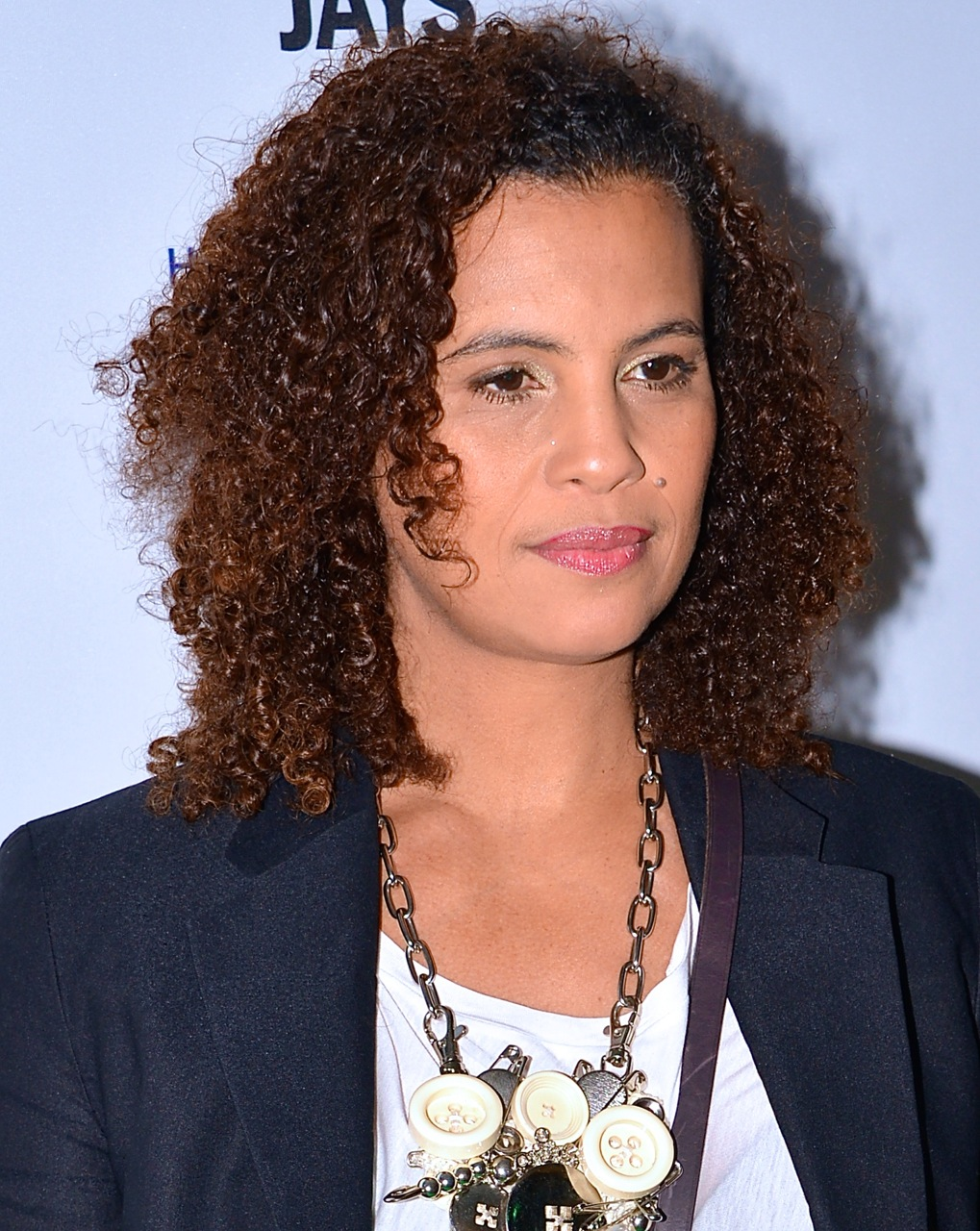
Swedish pop artist Neneh Cherry was an early inspiration to Lara Croft's creation.

Core Design, a subsidiary of Eidos, (Note: In 1994, CentreGold acquired the Derby-based video game developer Core Design. Eidos subsequently acquired CentreGold in April 1996.) created Lara Croft as the lead protagonist of its video game Tomb Raider, which began development in 1994. Lead graphic artist Toby Gard went through about five designs before arriving at the character's final appearance. He initially envisioned a male lead character with a whip and a hat. Core Design co-founder Jeremy Smith characterised Gard's initial design as derivative of Indiana Jones and asked for more originality. Gard decided that a female character would work better from a design standpoint. He also cited Virtua Fighter as an influence; Gard noticed that while watching people play the game, players selected one of the two available female characters in the game almost every match he saw. Gard expressed a desire to counter stereotypical female characters, which he has characterised as "bimbos" or "dominatrix" types. Smith was sceptical of a female lead at first because few contemporary games featured them. He came to regard a female lead as a great hook and put faith in Gard's idea. Inspired by pop artist Neneh Cherry and comic book character Tank Girl, Gard experimented with different designs, including "sociopathic blonds, muscle women, flat topped hip-hopsters and a Nazi-like militant in a baseball cap". He settled on a tough South American Latina woman with a braid named Laura Cruz.

Tomb Raider co-creator Paul Douglas changed her given name after consulting a baby names book, "Lara had a more interesting derivation than Laura so we chose that. Lara is from the same derivation as Larisa. Which is derived from Larissa in Greece. Which means “citadel”. I thought that would be apt for her personality—enigmatic and guarded." Her surname was changed by scriptwriter Vicky Arnold later in development, "Cruz was changed to Croft quite a bit later in the project by Vicky. That came out of the Derby phonebook. Cruz was Spanish/Portuguese for Cross and it wasn’t too far from Cross to Croft. We must have stuck with the Cruz surname for a while as we got into the rut of referring to her as just Lara. In the first game design doc, dated December 1994, Laura is already changed to Lara but even in the final game design documents there are still places where Cruz hadn't yet changed to Croft." Along with the name change, the character's backstory was altered to incorporate a British origin.

Gard was keen to animate the character realistically, an aspect he felt the industry at the time had disregarded. He sacrificed quick animations in favour of more fluid movement, believing that players would empathise with the character more easily. Lara's dual-wielding of pistols was inspired by the film Hard Boiled and an Æon Flux short. In the first Tomb Raider, Croft's three-dimensional (3D) character model is made of around 230 polygons. The character's braid was removed from the model, but added back for subsequent iterations. Gavin Rummery, programmer on the first two Tomb Raider games, explained: "It had been dropped from the original because it just didn't work properly with all the acrobatic moves—it was more like she had an electric eel attached to her head that had a life of its own. But on TRII I came up with a way to get it working and was really pleased how natural it looked". Although widely reported that, while adjusting the character model, Gard accidentally increased the breasts' dimensions by 150 percent and the rest of the creative team argued to keep the change, Gard has stated that the notion "came out of a silly remark made in an interview". Core Design hired Shelley Blond to voice Croft after the game entered the beta phase of development. Gard left Core Design after completing Tomb Raider, citing a lack of creative freedom and control over marketing decisions related to the ideas he developed (especially Lara Croft). Victor Interactive Software asked Core Design to redesign Lara with a larger head and eyes to appeal to a Japanese audience. Illustrations drawn by Hiromasa Ota and a render of the design were faxed through late into development. Gard did not want to alter Lara's appearance; as a compromise, the design was used only in the Japanese manuals and guide. (Note: Attributed to multiple references:)

Core Design improved and modified the character with each installment. Developers for Tomb Raider II increased the number of polygons in the character's model and added more realistic curves to its design. Other changes included new outfits and manoeuvres. Core Design reportedly planned to implement crawling as a new gameplay option, but the option did not appear until Tomb Raider III. Actress Judith Gibbins took over voice acting responsibilities and stayed on through the third game. For Tomb Raider III, the developers increased the number of polygons in Croft's 3D model to about 300, and introduced more abilities to the gameplay. Core Design wanted to reintroduce the character to players in Tomb Raider: The Last Revelation and included a flashback scenario with a younger Lara. The developers expanded the character's set of moves threefold to allow more interaction with the environment, like swinging on ropes and kicking open doors. The character model was altered to feature more realistic proportions, and Jonell Elliott replaced Gibbins as the voice of Lara Croft. By the time development for The Last Revelation began, Core Design had worked on the series constantly for four years and the staff felt they had exhausted their creativeness. Feeling the series lacked innovation, Core Design decided to kill the character and depicted Croft trapped by a cave-in during the final scenes of the game.

The next title, Tomb Raider Chronicles, depicted the late Lara Croft via her friends' flashbacks. The game introduced stealth attacks, which would carry over to the next game, Tomb Raider: The Angel of Darkness. While the original development team worked on Chronicles, Core Design assigned a new team to develop The Angel of Darkness for the PlayStation 2. Anticipating innovative changes from next-generation consoles, Adrian Smith—co-founder of Core Design—wanted to reinvent the character to keep pace with the updated technology. Core Design conducted market research, including fan polls, to aid in The Angel of Darkness' development. The development team felt it could not alter the character and instead opted to place her in a situation different from previous games. The PlayStation 2 hardware allowed for more manoeuvres and a more detailed character model; the number of polygons in Croft's model increased to 4,400. The team sought to add more melee manoeuvres to better match Lara Croft's portrayal as an expert fighter in her backstory. Movement control was switched from the directional pad to the analogue control stick to provide more precision. After the original team finished Chronicles, it joined the development of The Angel of Darkness. Excess content, missed production deadlines, and Eidos' desire to time the game's launch to coincide with the release of the 2003 Tomb Raider film resulted in what was criticized as a poorly designed game; Croft was brought back to life without explanation and the character controls lacked precision.

=== Developer switch to Crystal Dynamics ===
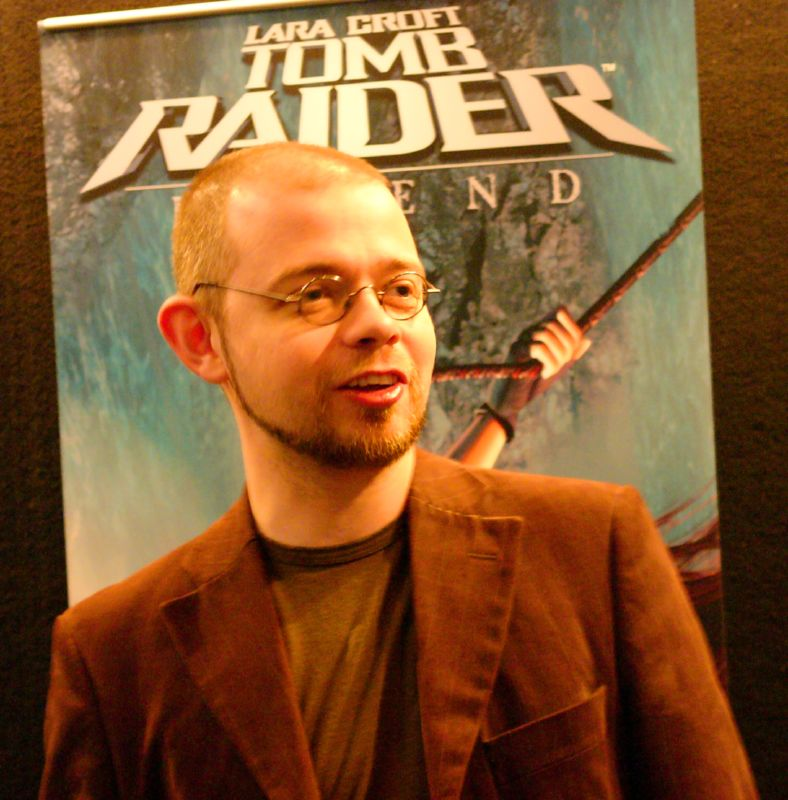
Toby Gard, Lara Croft's original designer, left Core Design in 1997, but returned to work with Crystal Dynamics as a consultant.

The Angel of Darkness was received poorly, prompting Eidos—fearing financial troubles (Note: Eidos sought another company to acquire it due to poor financial health in 2004, in a response to which it was acquired by SCi Games the year after.) from another unsuccessful game—to give development duties for future titles to Crystal Dynamics, another Eidos subsidiary. The Legacy of Kain development team began work on a new title (Tomb Raider: Legend), which would essentially reboot the franchise, significantly changing her origin story, with Toby Gard returning to work as a consultant. The development team reassessed the brand value of the franchise and its protagonist. Chip Blundell, Eidos's vice-president of brand management, commented that the designers understood that fans saw the character and brand as their own, rather than Eidos's. With that in mind, the team retooled the franchise and character to emphasise aspects of the original game that made them unique. The storyline intended for a trilogy of games that started with The Angel of Darkness was abandoned and a new plot was created for Legend.

Crystal Dynamics focused on believability rather than realism to re-develop the character, posing decisions around the question, "What could Lara do?", and giving her action more freedom. The designers updated Lara Croft's move set to make her movements appear more fluid and continuous. The animations were also updated so the character could better interact with environmental objects. The developers introduced a feature that causes the character's skin and clothing to appear wet after swimming and dirty after rolling on the ground. Responding to criticism directed at the character controls in The Angel of Darkness, Crystal Dynamics redesigned the character's control scheme to provide what it felt was the best third-person action experience. The developers also introduced close-quarter melee manoeuvres. Crystal Dynamics updated the character model to add more realism, but retained past design elements. The polygon count increased to over 9,800. More attention was paid to the character's lip synching and facial expressions to allow for dynamic emotional responses to in-game events. In redesigning the character's appearance, Crystal Dynamics updated Croft's hairstyle, wardrobe, and accessories. Her shirt was changed to a V-neck crop top, her body was given more muscle tone, and her hair braid was switched to a ponytail. The voice actor for Lara Croft was initially rumoured to be Rachel Weisz, but the role was eventually given to Keeley Hawes. Crystal Dynamics retained the design changes for the next game, Tomb Raider: Anniversary, a remake of the first game. The designers aimed to portray Croft with more emotional depth, and focused on the character's desire to achieve the end goal of the game, culminating in killing one of the antagonists. The developers used the death to evoke guilt in Croft afterward and illustrate that shooting a person should be a difficult choice.

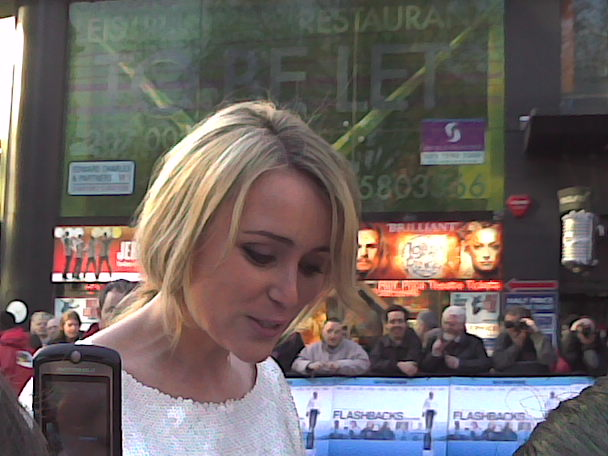
Keeley Hawes portrayed Lara in the most games, starting with Tomb Raider: Legend in 2006.

Tomb Raider: Underworld continued the plot line established in Legend. Crystal Dynamics used new technology to improve the character for seventh-generation consoles, focusing on improving realism. The dirt accumulation and water cleansing mechanic from Legend was altered to be a real-time mechanic that can involve the entire game environment. To achieve a more natural appearance, the developers added spherical harmonics to provide indirect lighting to in-game objects like Lara Croft. Crystal Dynamics made the character model more complex and detailed than previous instalments, featuring more texture layers that determine the appearance of shadows and reflective light on it, and using skeletal animation to portray believable movement. The number of polygons in the model increased to 32,000. The developers enhanced Croft's facial model by increasing the number of polygons, bones used in the animation skeleton, and graphical shaders in the face to add more detail and expressive capabilities. The hair was created as a real-time cloth simulation to further add realism to its shape and movement. The developers kept Croft's hair tied back because they felt a real person would not want it flying around while performing dangerous manoeuvres. The character's body size was increased and breast size reduced to portray more realistic proportions.

The developers tried to redefine Lara Croft's actions by questioning what they felt the character was capable of. While previous games used hand-animated movement for the character, Underworld introduced motion capture-based animation to display more fluid, realistic movement and facial expressions. Stuntwoman and Olympic Gold medalist Heidi Moneymaker was the motion capture actress, and advised the designers on practical movements. Animators adjusted and blended the recorded animation to create seamless transitions between the separate moves and their simultaneous combinations. The blends and additional animations give the character more flexible movement. Actions were overlapped to allow for multitasking, such as aiming at two separate targets and shooting with one hand while the other holds an object collected from the environment. Other additions include more melee attacks, as well as contextual offensive and climbing manoeuvres. Crystal Dynamics sought to make the visual appearance of the Xbox 360 and PlayStation 3 versions identical, although the systems used different techniques to achieve this. In response to Underworld's lackluster sales figures, Eidos reportedly considered altering the character's appearance to appeal more to female fans.

=== Publisher switch to Square Enix ===
"After crafting the biography, our goal was to make her as believable and relatable as possible. We wanted to make a girl that felt familiar, but still has a special quality about her. Something about the way her eyes look and the expression on her face makes you want to care for her. That was our number one goal. We wanted to have empathy for Lara, and at the same time show the inner strength that made clear she was going to become a hero".

— Brian Horton, senior art director of Crystal Dynamics, on the second reboot

Japanese game company Square Enix acquired Eidos in April 2009, restructuring Eidos into Square Enix Europe. Crystal Dynamics remained as developer of the Tomb Raider games. Lara Croft and the Guardian of Light introduced cooperative gameplay to the series, a move that brand director Karl Stewart said was meant to "show [Lara] as a more humanistic character" by placing her in a situation that differed from previous instalments. The game uses the same technology featured in the studio's past Tomb Raider games. Despite the changes implemented in the titles, Crystal Dynamics believed that the series required further reinvention to stay relevant.

In late 2010, Square Enix announced a franchise reboot titled Tomb Raider; the new Lara Croft would be a darker, grittier reimagining of the character. In examining the character, Crystal Dynamics concluded that Croft's largest failing was her "Teflon coating", and that it needed a more human version that players would care about. The studio sought a new voice actress, trialling dozens of relatively unknown performers.

Lara Croft's redesign as she appears in the 2013 reboot

The second reboot focuses on the origin of the character, and as a result, changes the previous back story. Staff opted to first work on the character's biography rather than cosmetic aspects. Crystal Dynamics sought to avoid the embellished physique of past renditions and pushed for realistic proportions. In redesigning the character's appearance, the designers began with simple concepts and added features that it felt made Lara Croft iconic: a ponytail, "M-shaped" lips, and the spatial relationship between her eyes, mouth, and nose. The company also changed the character's wardrobe, focusing on what it believed was more functional and practical. In designing the outfits, staff aimed to create a look that was "relevant" and "youthful", but not too "trendy" or "hip". To gauge the redesign, Crystal Dynamics conducted eye tracking studies on subjects who viewed the new version and previous ones. Camilla Luddington voiced Lara Croft in the reboot.

Similar to Underworld, the new Tomb Raider features motion capture-based animation. In an effort to present realism and emotion in the character, Crystal Dynamics captured face and voice performances to accompany the body performances. The company revamped Croft's in-game combat abilities. Crystal Dynamics aimed to make the "combat fresh to the franchise, competitive amongst [similar games], and relevant to the story". Among the changes is the implementation of a free aiming system. The studio reasoned that such a system would cause players to be more invested in the action by fostering a "raw, brutal, and desperate" style. Global brand director Karl Stewart stated that such desperation relates to the updated character's inexperience with violence. He further commented that Lara Croft is thrust into a situation where she is forced to kill, which will be a traumatic and defining moment for her.

== Appearances ==
=== In video games ===
Lara Croft primarily appears in the Tomb Raider video game series published by Square Enix Europe (previously Eidos Interactive). The action-adventure games feature the protagonist travelling the world in search of rare objects and mystical artefacts. Croft first appeared in the 1996 video game Tomb Raider, in which she competes against a rival archaeologist in search of an Atlantean artefact. Tomb Raider II (1997) centres on the search for the Dagger of Xian, which is sought by thieves. Tomb Raider III (1998) focuses on meteorite fragments that endow humans with supernatural powers. In Tomb Raider: The Last Revelation (1999), the first depiction of a young Croft, she is accompanied by her mentor, Werner Von Croy. Lara searches for artefacts associated with the Egyptian god Horus, and later encounters Von Croy as an antagonist. In Tomb Raider: Chronicles (2000), most of the game relates adventures told via flashbacks. The first portable game, Tomb Raider (2000), was released on the Game Boy Color, and follows the character's search for the Nightmare Stone. A second Game Boy Color title, Tomb Raider: Curse of the Sword (2001), sees Lara Croft facing off against a cult. The next portable game, Tomb Raider: The Prophecy (2002), was released on the Game Boy Advance, and focuses on three magical stones. Tomb Raider: The Angel of Darkness (2003) was released on home platforms, centring on the murder of Professor Von Croy.

Eidos rebooted the series with Tomb Raider: Legend (2006), which focuses on Lara Croft's search for Excalibur and her mother, altering the character's backstory as part of the redesign. Tomb Raider: Anniversary (2007), a remake of the first game in the series, carried over design elements from Legend. Tomb Raider: Underworld (2008) continues the plot introduced in Legend. The story centres on Croft's search for information about her mother's disappearance. In the process she learns of the existence of Thor's hammer, Mjölnir. Lara Croft and the Guardian of Light (2010) is a downloadable game that is set in a Central American jungle, and features an ancient warrior who works with Lara Croft. In 2013, the series was rebooted a second time with the game Tomb Raider, which retold the story of Lara's origins and began a new continuity. Its sequel Rise of the Tomb Raider was released in 2015, and the third game, Shadow of the Tomb Raider, in 2018.

The character is featured in several games outside the Tomb Raider series. Lara Croft appears as a Diana DLC crossover skin in the fighting game Brawlhalla. She makes a cameo appearance in the PlayStation 5 game Astro's Playroom. Lara Croft appears in Fortnite Battle Royale's sixth season of the second chapter and was featured in a "Team Up!" mode with Aloy from Horizon Zero Dawn. Fortnite later added a separate Angel of Darkness-styled skin in 2025. Lara Croft also appeared in Call of Duty: Modern Warfare II's Season 5 Reloaded update. Lara Croft appears as a playable character in Hero Wars: Alliance and Hero Wars: Dominion Era as part of a special time-limited event. In July 2024, Croft was added as a playable character in the online horror game Dead by Daylight with the release of the Tomb Raider DLC.

=== In films ===
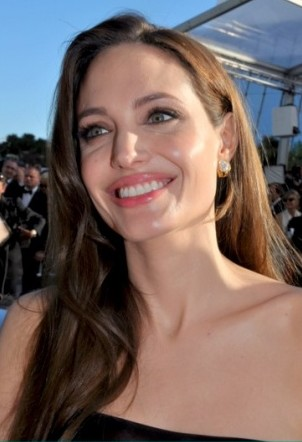
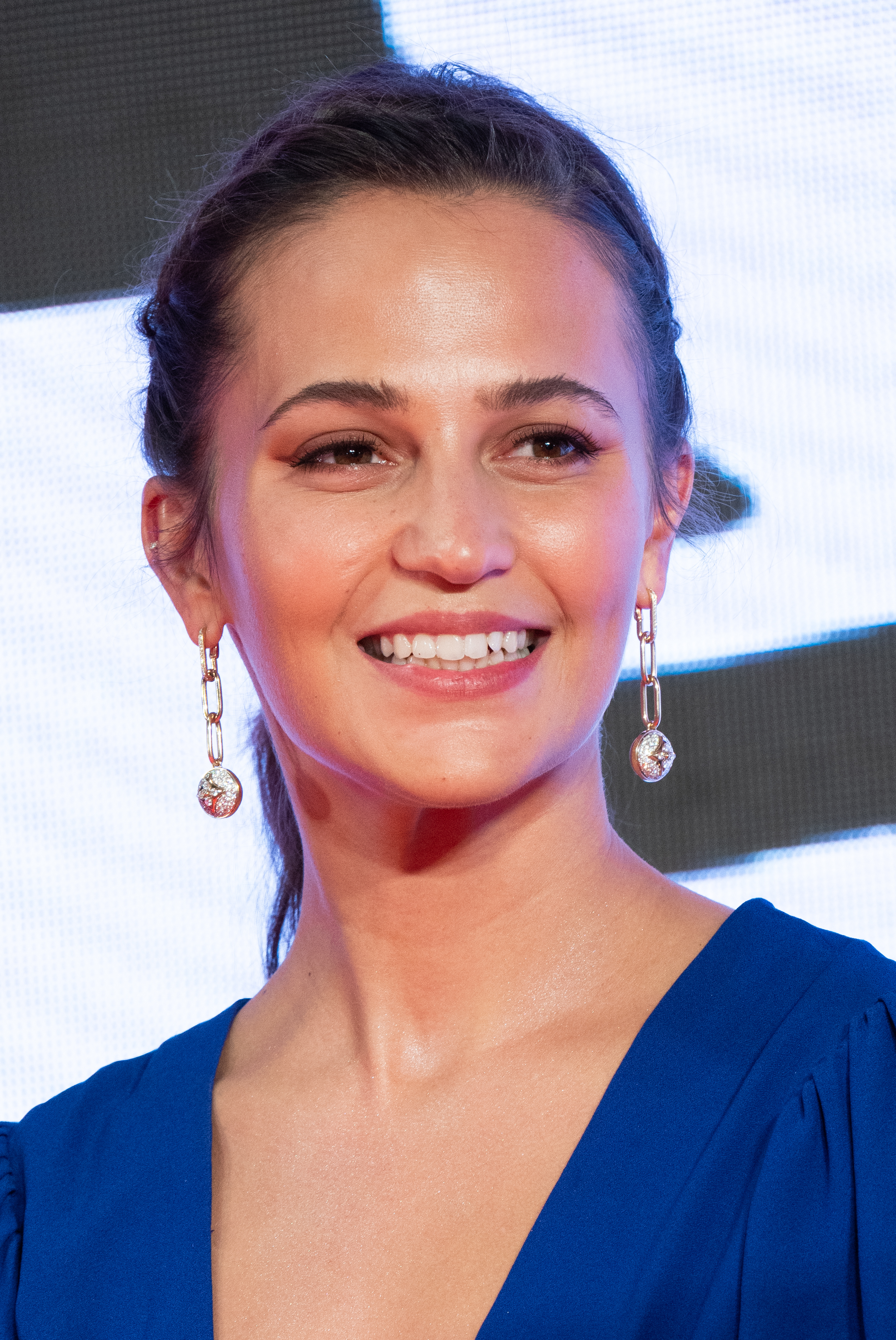
Angelina Jolie (left) portrayed Lara Croft in the 2001 and 2003 original films. Alicia Vikander (right) played the character in the 2018 reboot film.

Paramount Pictures acquired the film rights for Tomb Raider in 1998, and released Lara Croft: Tomb Raider in 2001. Producer Lloyd Levin stated that the filmmakers tried to capture the essence of the video game elements rather than duplicate them. Acknowledging the character's "huge fan base" and recognisable appearance, director Simon West sought an actress with acting ability as well as physical attributes similar to Croft. Paramount also received input from developer Core Design on casting. Rumoured actresses included Pamela Anderson, Demi Moore and Jeri Ryan. Academy Award-winning actress Angelina Jolie was eventually cast to play Lara Croft. She had not been a fan of the character, but considered the role as a "big responsibility", citing anxiety about fans' high expectations. Producer Lawrence Gordon felt she was a perfect fit for the role. Jolie braided her hair and used minimal padding to increase her bust a cup size to 36D for the role. She felt that Croft's video game proportions were unrealistic, and wanted to avoid showing such proportions to young girls. Jolie trained rigorously for the action scenes required for the role, occasionally sustaining injuries. Her training focused on practising the physical skills necessary to perform the film's stunts. The difficulty of the training and injuries discouraged her, but she continued working through production. Jolie also encountered difficulties when working the guns, bungee jumping, and maneuvering with the braid. West had not anticipated that Jolie would do her own stunts, and was impressed, as was stunt coordinator Simon Crane, by the effort she put into them.

Angelina Jolie reprised her role for a sequel, Lara Croft: Tomb Raider – The Cradle of Life. Directed by Jan de Bont, the 2003 film focused more on the character's development. De Bont praised Jolie's understanding of Lara Croft, as well as the character's strength, saying he "hates women in distress". Producer Levin commented that the film staff tried to handle the character properly, and consulted with the video game developers on what would be appropriate. Despite the second film's poor reception, Paramount remained open to releasing a third. Jolie was still optioned to play the character in a third film as late as 2007, though she had commented in 2004 that she had no intention of reprising the role again.

Development for a third film was announced in 2009, with Dan Lin as the producer. Lin intended to reboot the film series with a young Croft in an origin story. In 2011, Olivia Wilde denied rumours that she would play the role, but still expressed interest. The film, originally meant for a 2013 release, was to be produced by Graham King, written by Marti Noxon and produced by Metro-Goldwyn-Mayer in partnership with King's studio GK Films. Alicia Vikander was cast in 2016 to play Lara in the next film adaptation. Tomb Raider, directed by Roar Uthaug, was released in 2018 and takes inspiration mostly from the rebooted series that started in 2013. A sequel was in development, but was cancelled in July 2022 after MGM lost the film rights to the franchise due to its expiration. Vikander briefly reprised the role in 2022 for the attraction Tomb Raider: The Live Experience in Camden Market, providing voiceover for the character.

=== In other adaptations ===
Beginning in 1997, the character regularly appeared in comics by Top Cow Productions. Lara Croft first appeared in a crossover in Sara Pezzini's Witchblade, and later starred in her own comic book series in 1999. The series began with Dan Jurgens as the writer, featuring artwork by Andy Park and Jon Sibal. The stories were unrelated to the video games until issue 32 of the Tomb Raider series, which adapted Angel of Darkness's plot. The series ran for 50 issues in addition to special issues. Other printed adaptations are Lara Croft Tomb Raider: The Amulet of Power, a 2003 novel written by Mike Resnick; Lara Croft Tomb Raider: The Lost Cult, a 2004 novel written by E. E. Knight; and Lara Croft Tomb Raider: The Man of Bronze, a 2005 novel written by James Alan Gardner.

GameTap released Revisioned: Tomb Raider in 2007 via the GameTap TV section of its website. The web series is a collection of ten short animated films that features re-imagined versions of Croft by well-known animators, comic book artists, and writers, including Jim Lee, Warren Ellis, and Peter Chung. Episodes ranged from five to seven and half minutes in length, featuring Minnie Driver as Croft. The creative staff was given considerable freedom to re-interpret the character; they did not consult the video game designers, but were given a guide listing acceptable and unacceptable practices. Hayley Atwell voices Lara in the Netflix animated series, Tomb Raider: The Legend of Lara Croft. A Tomb Raider streaming series, featuring Sophie Turner as Lara, is currently in production, to be released on Amazon Prime Video.

== Promotion and merchandising ==
Eidos's German branch and the KMF agency handled marketing for Lara Croft. According to Eidos, no focus groups or scientific studies were consulted when devising the marketing strategy for the character. Eidos marketing manager David Burton oversaw marketing efforts, which attempted to portray the character as attractive and pleasant. However, interaction with the press, especially those in Europe, resulted in less clothing depicted in promotional images. Concerned with diluting Croft's personality, Eidos avoided products it felt did not fit the character. Ian Livingstone, Eidos's product acquisition director, commented that the company declines most merchandising proposals. He stated that Eidos primarily focused on game development and viewed such promotion outside video games as exposure for the character. Following Square Enix's acquisition, Eidos's marketing duties were transferred to the Square Enix Europe subsidiary. As part of the second reboot, Crystal Dynamics planned to align all products, promotions, and media ventures with its new version of the character.

Lara Croft has appeared on the cover of multiple video game magazines. The character has also been featured on the cover of non-video game publications such as British style magazine The Face, American news magazines Time and Newsweek, German magazine Focus, and the front page of British newspaper the Financial Times. By April 2025, she had made over 2,300 cover appearances, earning a Guinness World Records for the "most magazine covers for a video game character". Eidos licensed the character for third party advertisements, including television ads for Visa, Lucozade drinks, G4 TV, Brigitte magazine, and SEAT cars (Seat Ibiza, Seat Cordoba, Seat Alhambra and Seat Arosa). Retro Gamer staff attributes Croft's "iconic" status in part to the Lucozade commercials, calling them one of the most memorable advertisements to use video game elements. Picture advertisements appeared on the sides of double-decker buses and walls of subway stations. Irish rock band U2 commissioned custom renders for video footage displayed on stage in its 1997 PopMart tour. German punk band Die Ärzte's 1998 music video for "Men are Pigs" (German: "Männer sind Schweine") also features Croft. Music groups have dedicated songs to the character, culminating in the release of the album A Tribute to Lara Croft. Bands and artists including Depeche Mode, Moby, Faith No More, Jimi Tenor, and Apollo 440 donated their songs for the album. In conjunction with the release of the 2001 film adaptation, Eidos licensed Lara Croft free-of-charge to the Gordonstoun boarding school for a commercial. The school approached Eidos about use of the character. Eidos allowed the one-time licence due to Core Design's inclusion of Gordonstoun in Croft's fictional biography without the school's permission. Near the end of 2006, Lara Croft became the spokesmodel for the Skin Cancer Awareness Foundation of Minden, Nevada as part of its Sun Smart Teen Program. The foundation felt that the character personified the benefits of a healthy body, and that young teenagers could relate to Croft.

Lara Croft's likeness has been a model for merchandise. The first action figures were produced by Toy Biz, based on the video game version of the character. Playmates Toys released a series of action figures that depict Croft in different outfits and accessories from the video games, later producing figures modelled after Jolie for Lara Croft: Tomb Raider. Graphic designer Marc Klinnert of Studio OXMOX released 1/6-scale model kits of the character, and later built a full-scale version. Arcade: The Videogame Magazine and PlayStation Magazine promoted life-size Croft statues as contest prizes. Spurred by a rumour that Eidos provided Lara Croft autographs, fans wrote to the company to obtain them. The quantity prompted Eidos to quickly produce autographed cards to meet demand. Tomb Raider: Underworld themes and wallpapers featuring the character were released for the PlayStation 3. Xbox Live Marketplace released Xbox 360 avatars in conjunction with Lara Croft and the Guardian of Light. Eidos released a brand of Lara Croft apparel and accessories, marketed under the label "LARA". The line included wallets, watches, bathrobes, and Zippo lighters. Other third-party apparel are hiking boots, backpacks, leather jackets, and thermoses. Croft's likeness has also appeared on French postage stamps, PlayStation memory cards, and trading cards as part of a collectible card game. In October 1997, Eidos held an art exhibition titled "Lara Goes Art" in Hamburg, Germany to promote Tomb Raider II. The exhibit featured selected artwork of the character submitted by artists and fans. Pieces included oil and airbrushed paintings, photo comics, and Klinnert's model; SZM Studios provided the computer-generated footage it had created for Die Ärzte's music video and the Brigitte magazine television commercial.

=== Promotional models ===
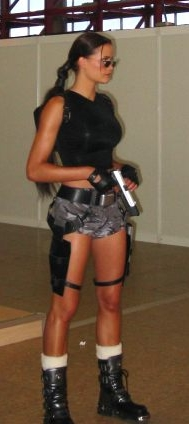
Jill de Jong

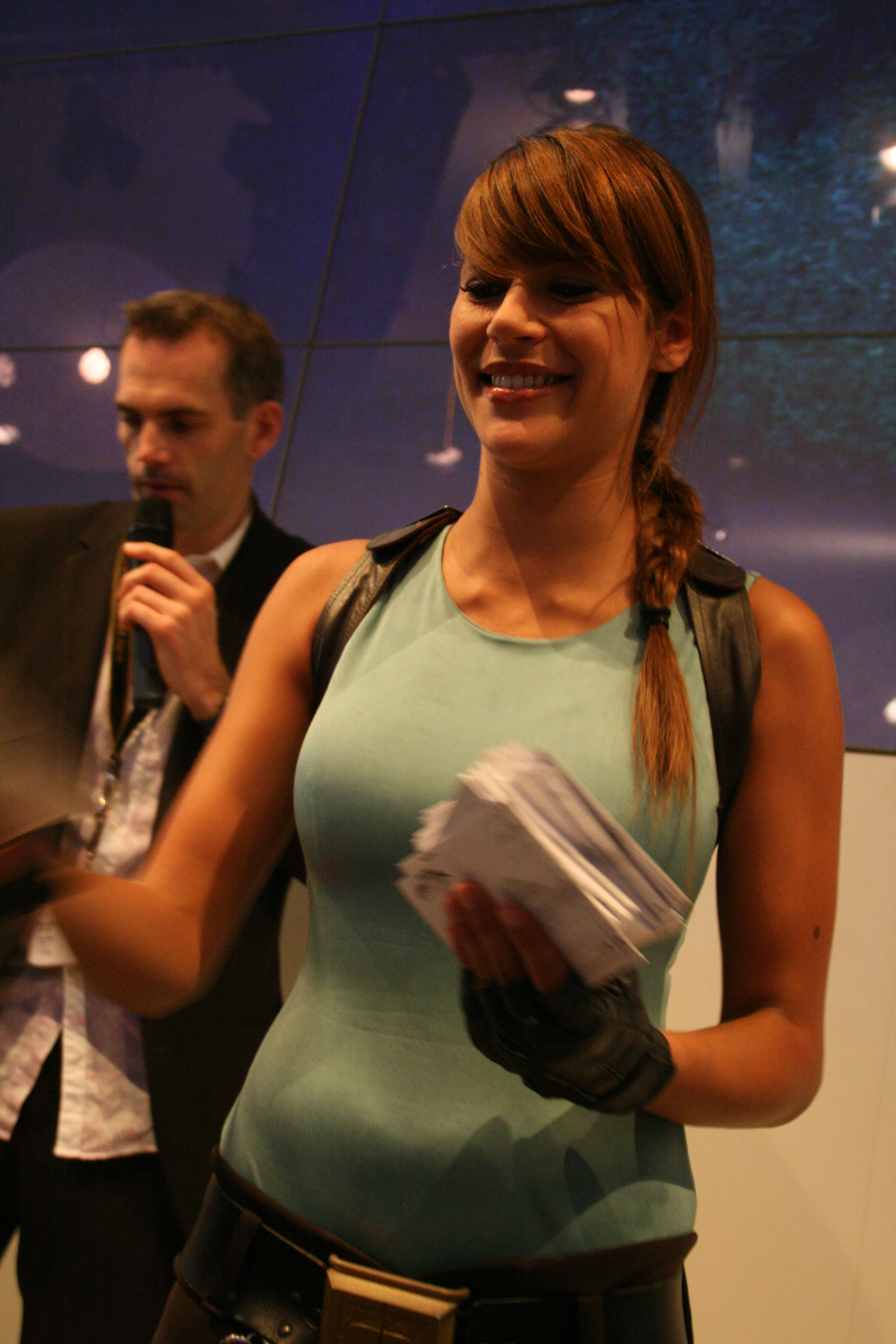
Karima Adebibe

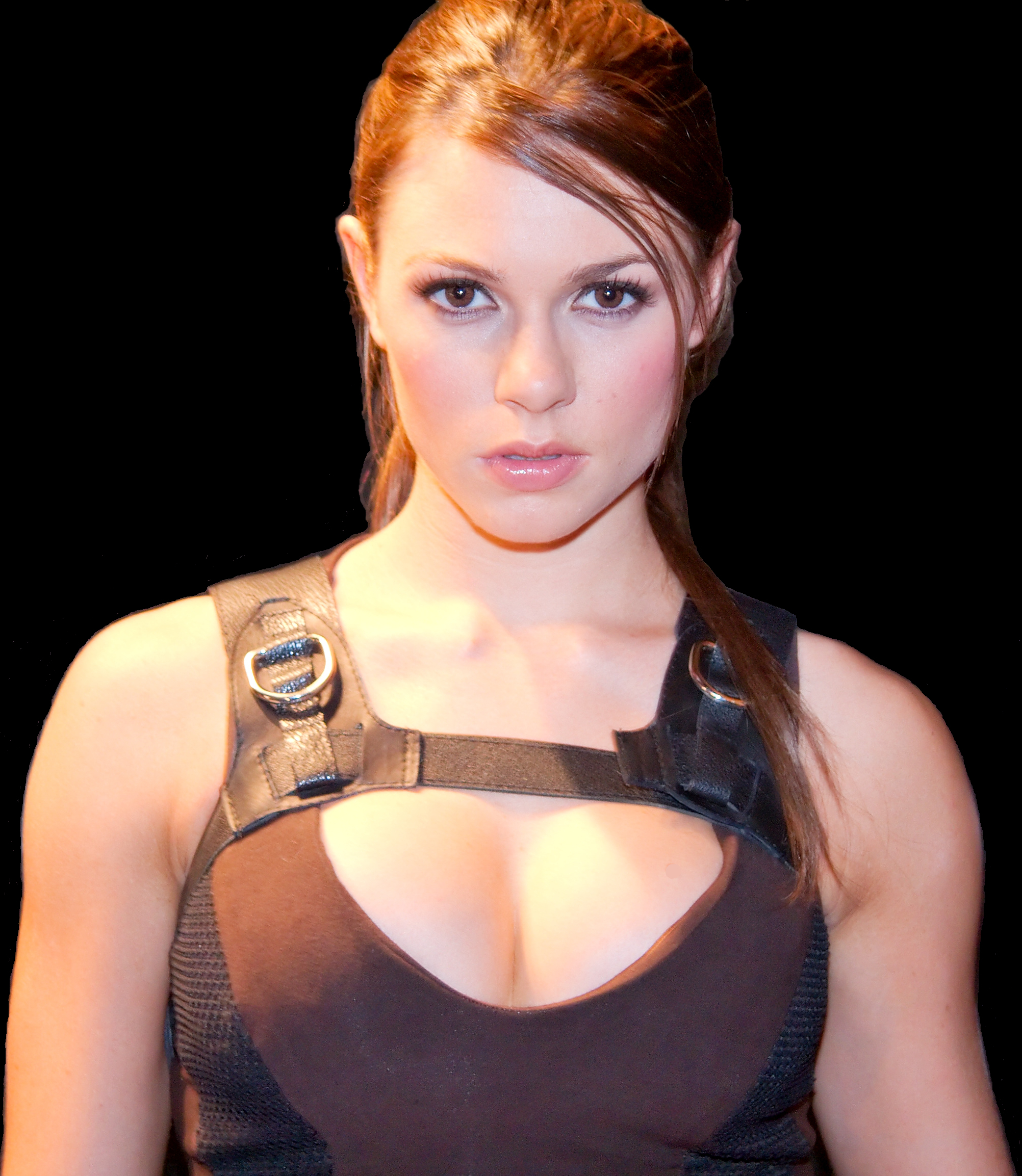
Alison Carroll

Many models have portrayed Lara Croft for promotional appearances, earning the character a Guinness World Record for the "most official real-life stand-ins".

Eidos hired several models to portray Lara Croft at publicity events, promotions, trade shows, and photo shoots. Initially Eidos employed four models to dress as Lara for a photo call at a trade event, but after witnessing the unusually large crowd the models drew, they decided to expand the concept by casting a single official Lara who would role-play the character. Nathalie Cook was the first model to assume the role individually, portraying the character from 1996 to 1997. Cook was followed by British actress Rhona Mitra from 1997 to 1998. Eidos then updated the Croft costume to match its video game depiction. Core Design said they restricted Mitra's dialogue as the character, only allowing her to answer questions in-character if Core had reviewed the questions ahead of time and scripted answers. French model Vanessa Demouy succeeded Mitra for a brief time until fashion model Nell McAndrew took over the role at the 1998 Electronic Entertainment Expo. McAndrew was selected from around 150 women who auditioned for the role. Afterward, the model was surprised she was picked despite auditioning with a shaved head at the time. McAndrew portrayed Croft from 1998 until 1999, when Eidos fired her for posing in Playboy, which used the character and Tomb Raider franchise to promote the McAndrew's issue without Eidos's approval. Core Design was granted an injunction against the magazine to protect the character's image; Playboy was ordered to place stickers on the cover of the issue to conceal the reference to Tomb Raider. Eidos later donated McAndrew's Tomb Raider costume to a UNICEF charity auction.

Lara Weller followed McAndrew from 1999 to 2000. Subsequent models were Lucy Clarkson from 2000 to 2002 and Jill de Jong, who wore a costume based on Lara Croft's new appearance in Angel of Darkness from 2002 to 2004. Karima Adebibe became the model from 2006 to 2008, and wore a costume based on the updated version of Croft in Legend. She was the first model Eidos allowed to portray Lara Croft outside posing for photography. To prepare for the role, Adebibe trained in areas the character was expected to excel in like combat, motorcycling, elocution, and conduct. Gymnast Alison Carroll succeeded Adebibe in 2008 and featured apparel based on the character's appearance in Underworld. Similar to Adebibe, Carroll received special training—Special Air Service (SAS) survival, weapons, and archaeology—to fill the role. Crystal Dynamics discontinued the use of models as part of the franchise's second reboot. The number of models prompted Guinness World Records to award the character an official record for the "most official real life stand-ins" in 2008.

== Reception and legacy ==
Lara Croft's introduction was widely regarded as an innovation in the video game market, (Note: Sources include.) with Rob Smith of PlayStation: The Official Magazine describing her as a video game icon of that generation of games. IGN credited a rise in PlayStation sales in part to Croft's debut on the system, and PlayStation Magazine attributed the first title's success to the character. Official U.S. PlayStation Magazine stated alternatively that Tomb Raider's PlayStation success propelled the character to prominence, making her a mascot for the system. PlayStation Magazine credits coverage in the Financial Times in 1997 as the starting point of the character's mainstream attention. Jeremy Smith commented that the Financial Times is "a very serious, sober, broadsheet newspaper, and hardly the place you might expect Lara to be 'discovered'. But Eidos had announced its latest financial results, which were great results, and so the Financial Times had decided to put Eidos on the front page. They'd been given some Eidos information and artwork, and they decided to use Lara to illustrate their news piece". He further said that Eidos had not actively courted Lara's early magazine cover appearances or otherwise actively promoted the character at the time. As years progressed, Lara Croft's popularity declined due to a string of poorly received video game sequels. The Angel of Darkness is often cited as the character's low point. IGN editor Colin Moriarty stated that while she began as an intelligent and strong female character, her games grew bland and Lara Croft became more like a "virtual blow-up doll".

Crystal Dynamics' rendition of Croft in Legend garnered wide, though not universal, praise; many publications described the portrayal as a successful reboot. Game Informer named Lara Croft the number six top video game hero of 2006, citing the character's successful reprise in popularity. The magazine cited the character's alterations in Legend as the reason for her resurgent success. Chris Slate of PlayStation Magazine lauded the character changes in Legend, commenting that "Lara is finally back". He praised Eidos's decision to switch developers and Crystal Dynamics' contributions, especially the character's new gameplay manoeuvres and updated appearance. Others, such as Schedeen and GamePro's Patrick Shaw, felt that the makeover did not improve the character. Fans also disapproved of the changes, especially the switch from the braid.

Dr. Mark Griffiths of Nottingham Trent University described Lara Croft as a psychological tabula rasa. Richard Rouse of Midway Games attributed the character's appeal to a loosely defined personality, which permits players to imprint their own onto her. Jeremy Smith stated that the minimal personality allows players to form a relationship with the character, and that rather than taking on the role of the character they were sharing the game's experience with her. Burton added that Croft is perceived differently around the world. French demographics focus on her sex appeal, while German and British audiences are drawn to her aggressiveness and aloofness, respectively. Fansites dedicated to Lara Croft appeared on the internet in several languages after the release of Tomb Raider, and contained official and fan-created images of Croft, model photographs, and fan fiction starring the character. More than 100 such sites were present by the end of 1998. By 2000, search engine HotBot yielded around 4,700 pages for a search of the character's name. Admirers discussed rumours related to Lara Croft via usenet newsgroups and ICQ chats. Enthusiasts collected merchandise and paraphernalia, submitted fan art to video game magazines, participated in Croft cosplay, and obtained tattoos depicting the character. One admirer rode a bike over 500 miles (800 km) from Amsterdam to Derby wearing Lara Croft-brand clothing to meet the developers, who welcomed him after learning of the trip.

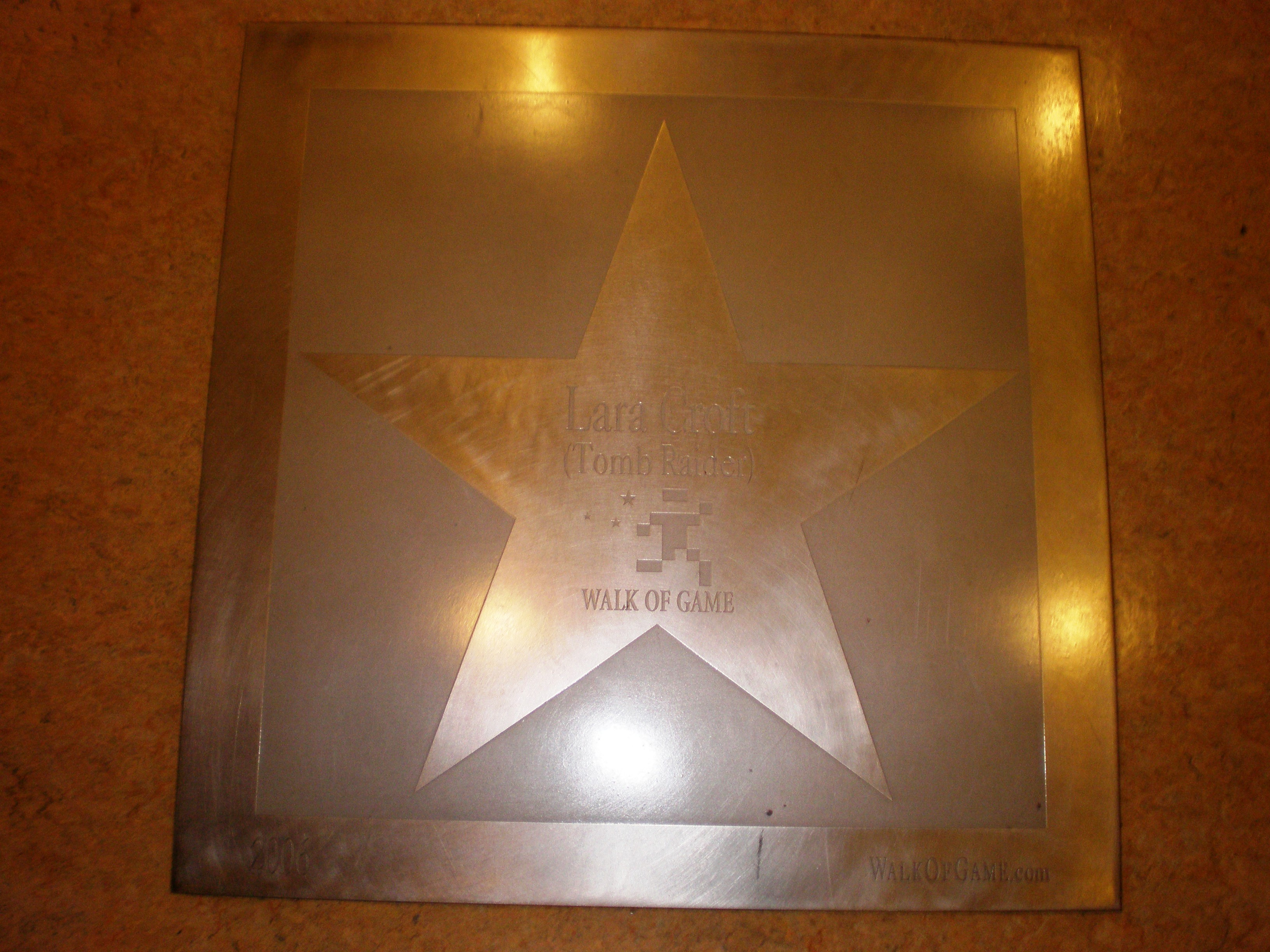
Lara's star at the Walk of Game

Lara Croft holds a Guinness World Record as the "most recognized female video game character", and received a star on the Walk of Game in San Francisco. Magazines, including Guinness World Records Gamer's Edition, have also described her as one of the iconic and best female video game character of all time. (Note: Several publications have listed her as one of the best video game characters.) Game Informer commented that the character is well liked around the world, particularly in England. Official U.S. PlayStation Magazine described Croft as "one of today's premier videogame and movie heroes", and Play magazine described her as "3D gaming's first female superstar". Hartas called Croft one of the most famous game women, praising her independence. Karen Jones of Official U.S. PlayStation Magazine described the character as "one of the biggest stars on the PlayStation". In 1998, PlayStation Magazine commented that Lara Croft was one of the most memorable characters on the PlayStation console, and echoed a similar statement in 2004. Time magazine writer Chris Taylor called her "the foundation of one of the most successful franchises in video-game history". Guinness World Records named the character the best-selling video game heroine, following the Tomb Raider franchise surpassing 100 million units sold, in November 2025.

=== Sex symbol ===
Lara Croft has become a sex symbol for video games, despite Toby Gard's intentions for her to be sexy "only because of her power". Time magazine's Kristina Dell considered her the first sex symbol of video games. Schedeen stated that Croft is among the first video game icons to be accepted as a mainstream sex symbol. Robert Ashley of Official U.S. PlayStation Magazine described Lara Croft as the first video game character openly thought of as sexy, and attributed the appearance of similar 3D characters to her. Several publications listed big breasts as one of the character's most famous attributes. (Note: Sources include.) After interviewing players in 1998, Griffiths commented that players regularly mention Croft's breasts when discussing her. In 2008, the character was first and second on two UGO Networks lists of hottest video game characters. GameDaily placed Lara Croft number one on a similar list that same year, and PlayStation: The Official Magazine awarded her honourable mention for Game Babe of the Year. Croft has appeared in several issues of Play's Girls of Gaming special and PlayStation Magazine's Swimsuit special. (Note: The character has appeared in several issues of Play's Girls of Gaming special and PlayStation Magazine's Swimsuit special.) Layouts portray the character partially nude, in bikinis, and in revealing cocktail dresses, though Tomb Raider: Underworld's creative director Eric Lindstrom criticised such poses as out of character. He further stated that they conflict with Croft's popular strengths, and felt that fans respond more strongly to images of the character dressed more conservatively than to ones with provocative poses. PlayStation Magazine's staff agreed, commenting that better use of the character's sex appeal would please fans more.

Male players have performed in-game actions to make Lara Croft repeatedly say phrases and view closer camera angles of her bust, while pornography featuring the character has been distributed via the internet. (Note: Several sources have claimed Croft being involved in pornography.) After the first game's release, rumours appeared on the internet about a cheat code to remove the character's clothes. Despite Core Design's denial of such a code, the rumour persisted, fuelled by manipulated nude images. While the developers were annoyed by the rumour, Eidos management viewed it as good publicity and internally recommended including it when new games were being developed. The rumour lingered by the time Legend was released. PlayStation Magazine featured an April Fool's parody of Croft and the rumoured code referred to as "Nude Raider." Fans developed software patches to remove Lara Croft's clothing in the personal computer game releases.

"It was a defining moment for me as I watched her strut seductively across my screen and into the sex symbol status that would turn the gaming world on its head. Fast-forward eight years through the evolution of next-gen hardware, multimillion-dollar budgets, and massive acceptance of games in pop culture. Still, Lara Croft continues to personify an ongoing culture clash over gender, sexuality, empowerment, and objectification".

— 1UP.com's Zoe Flowers on Lara Croft's icon status in 2005

Reactions from groups have been mixed. The journal Leonardo noted some feminists' negative reaction to her design; though males were identifying with their feminine side through Croft, she reinforced unrealistic ideals about the female body. Australian feminist scholar Germaine Greer criticised her as an embodiment of male fantasies. In 1996, Electronic Gaming Monthly argued that rather than altering the state of women in games, Croft simply continued the trend of female characters in video games being large-breasted and scantily clad in an effort to appeal to the predominately male gaming audience, which had the overall impact of teaching gamers to see women as sex objects. PlayStation Magazine staff commented that Croft could be seen as either a role model for young independent girls or the embodiment of a male adolescent fantasy, though they later stated that the character does little to attract female demographics and was obviously designed with a male audience in mind. The magazine's editors also criticised Core Design's hypocritical attempts to downplay the character's sex appeal in public statements while releasing advertisements that prominently featured Lara Croft's sexuality. Graphic artist Heather Gibson attributed the "sexism" to participation from Eidos's marketing department.

Author Mark Cohen attributed Lara Croft's eroticism among male fans to the character's appearance and a male protective instinct. German psychologist Oscar Holzberg described the protective behaviour as the result of the opportunity to act as a hero in virtual worlds and a fear of powerful, emancipated women. Jonathan Smith of Arcade: The Videogame Magazine similarly noted that male players often see themselves as "chivalrous protectors" while playing the game. Holzberg further stated that the lower psychological investment inherent to virtual characters is more comfortable for males. Cohen affirmed that despite blatant male appeal, Croft garnered a serious female audience. Eidos estimated that by 2000 female consumers comprised 20–25 percent of Tomb Raider game purchases. Jeremy Smith argued that the series attracted more female players to video gaming, especially in Japan. Smith believed that Croft does not alienate prospective female players, representing an emancipated heroine and not simply an attractive character. According to Adrian Smith, the character was also popular with younger demographics that did not view her sexually. Cohen reasoned that Croft differs from other erotic characters and attractive leads, as the Tomb Raider games also feature rich action, impressive graphics, and intelligent puzzles; other such characters were unsuccessful because the game content was lacking. Amy Hennig of developer Naughty Dog and Griffiths echoed similar statements. GamesRadar editor Justin Towell nonetheless commented that he couldn't imagine a Tomb Raider game without a sexualised female lead.

Griffith described Lara Croft as a flawed female influence. He stated that though the character is a step in the right direction, too many women view her as a "crudely realised male fantasy figure". Women in the video game industry describe the character as both a positive and negative influence. Ismini Roby of WomenGamers.com commented that Croft was not a sexist influence in 1996, attributed to the lack of prominent female characters in video games at the time. She stated that the over-sexualized appearance was overlooked because the character was a "breath of fresh air", but Roby felt that though Lara Croft's proportions have become more realistic, the character's personality was diluted by the developer's actions to appeal to a male audience. LesbianGamers.com's Tracy Whitelaw called the character a dichotomy, stating that though Croft is viewed as "idealized" with an "unattainable body", the character was a great stride for the propagation of female characters as video game protagonists.

=== Cultural impact ===
Lara Croft's 1996 debut is often cited as a catalyst for more female leads in video games. Kaiser Hwang of PlayStation Magazine commented that she "brought girl power" to video games. IGN argued that Croft helped redefine gender in video games by providing a different interpretation of what women could do. Several publications have used her as the standard to which later female video game characters have been compared. Multiple video game publications have labelled the character a video game and cultural icon. (Note: Multiple sources have labelled the character a video game and cultural icon.) The title character in the 1998 German film Run Lola Run has often been compared to Croft. (Note: Sources which compare Lola to Croft include.) Comparisons were also made to Bond girl Christmas Jones from the 1999 James Bond series film The World Is Not Enough. Additionally, both Eidos Interactive senior executive John Davis and character spokeswoman Susie Hamilton noted the character's similarities to Lara Croft. Jeremy Smith credits Croft with exposing the Tomb Raider games and video games in general to a wider audience. Computer and Video Games commented that Croft's appearance on the cover of The Face signalled a change in the perception of video games from "geeky" to mainstream.

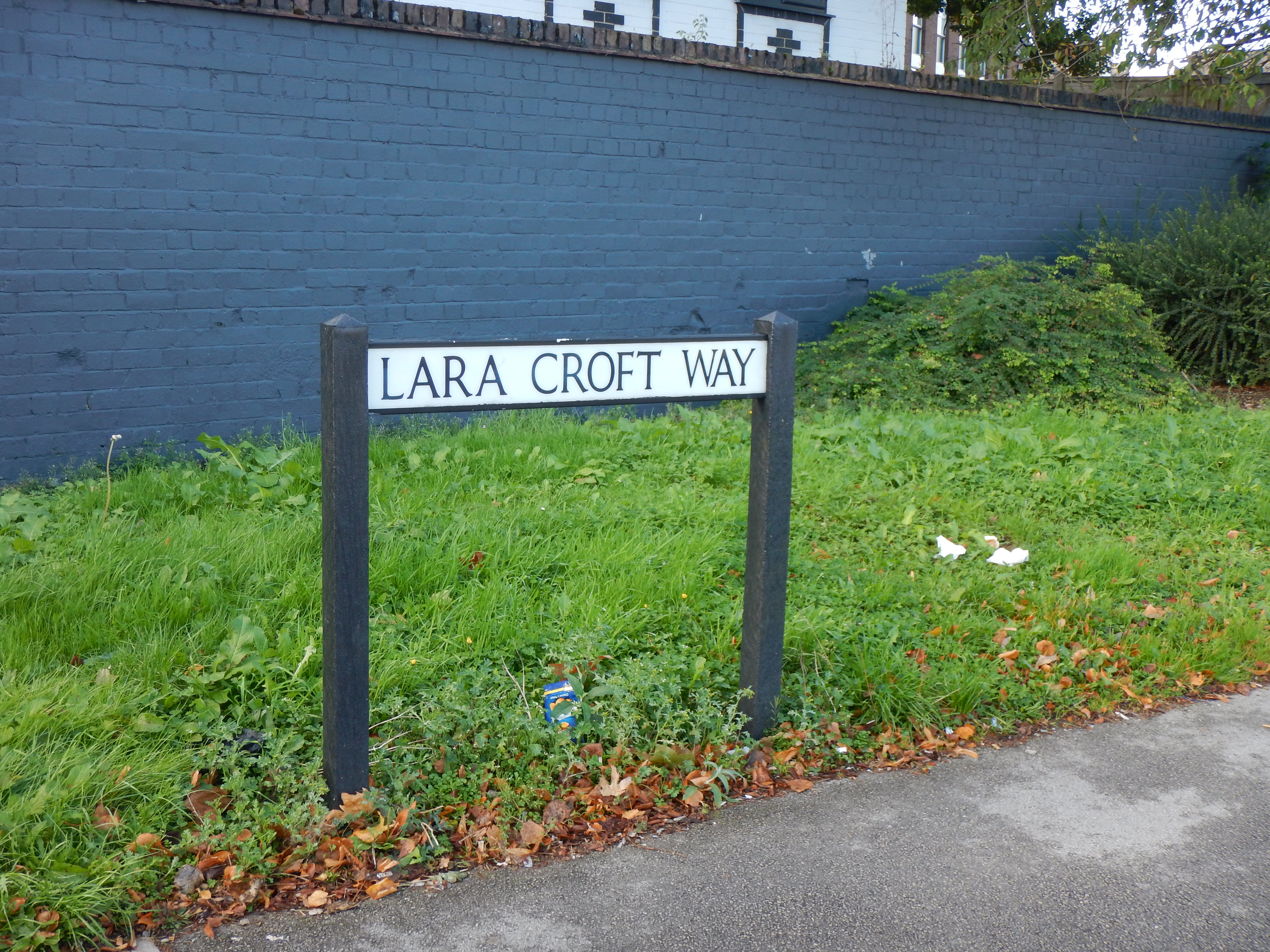
Lara Croft Way in Derby, Derbyshire

The character has been honoured in the United Kingdom, particularly in the English city Derby, previous home to Core Design. In 2007, Radleigh Homes placed a blue plaque for Croft at the site of Core Design's former offices, now a block of flats. The Derby City Council opened a public vote in 2009 to name its new ring road. The winning choice, with 89% of over 27,000 votes, was "Lara Croft Way", which later opened in July 2010. In 2019, the city unveiled a star for Croft in their Made in Derby walk of fame, the only fictional character with such an honour. In 2020, Croft appeared on four commemorative UK postage stamps issued by the Royal Mail to celebrate classic UK video games. A 2024 poll conducted by BAFTA with around 4,000 respondents named Lara Croft as the most iconic video-game character of all time. In 2026, Derby residents began a fundraiser to install in Derby Market Hall a larger-than-life statue of Lara Croft, originally made for the Tomb Raider: The Live Experience attraction at London's Camden Market. Luke Earle, the host of an annual Tomb Raider Day celebration in Derby, stated, "Just as Nottingham has Robin Hood, Derby has Lara Croft." The fundraiser successfully reached its goal for the statue to be installed.

Yahoo! Movies and IGN credit Jolie's role in the first Tomb Raider film with significantly raising her profile and propelling her to international super-stardom, respectively. Jolie commented that young children would ask her to sign objects as Lara Croft. After filming for the first movie at the Cambodian temple Ta Prohm, the local inhabitants called it the "Angelina Jolie Temple" and local restaurants served Jolie's favourite alcoholic beverage advertised as "Tomb Raider cocktails". IGN's Jesse Schedeen described Croft as one of few characters to receive a decent videogame-to-movie adaptation. By 2008, the first Tomb Raider film was the highest-grossing video game film and the largest opening ever for a movie headlined by a woman. It became the second highest-grossing video game movie in 2010, after the release of Prince of Persia: The Sands of Time, with Lara Croft Tomb Raider: The Cradle of Life as the fourth.

== See also ==
- List of female action heroes and villains
