= Alison Carroll =

English gymnast, model and actress

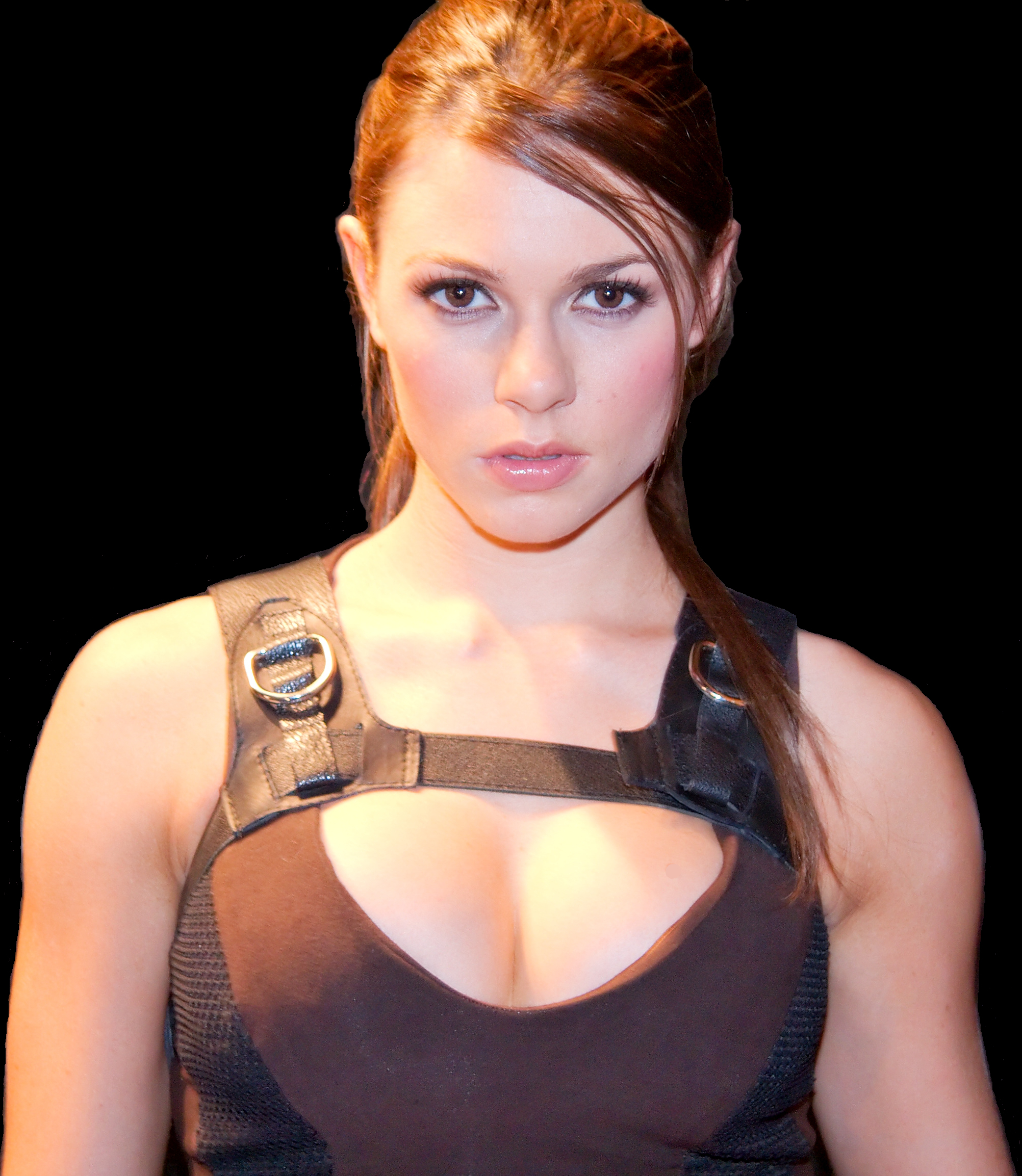
- Carroll in character as Lara Croft, 2008
- Born: 21 May
- Occupations: Gymnast; model; actress
- Modeling information
- Height: 1.63 m (5 ft 4 in)
- Hair color: Brown
- Eye color: Blue

Alison Carroll (born 21 May) is an English gymnast, model and actress. She was the live-action model of the video game character Lara Croft from 2008 to 2010.

== Biography ==
Carroll was born on 21 May. She trained at the Urdang Academy in Musical Theatre and graduated in 2007 with a distinction. Carroll has represented the United Kingdom as a professional display gymnast. She is also a teenagers' gymnastics coach, choreographing the winning junior team at the British National Championships.

Carroll began acting in 2007. In August 2008, Carroll was announced as the new Lara Croft model for the latest video game featuring the heroine, Tomb Raider: Underworld. Carroll replaced previous Lara model Karima McAdams, who retired from the role earlier in the year. Carroll held the position until 2010 and is the final official Lara Croft model, as the use of models has been discontinued for future Tomb Raider games.

Carroll was cast in the 2010 thriller Life is an Art. The movie screened at the Cannes Film Festival in 2010.

In January 2011, Carroll appeared in the action film Amsterdam Heavy by director Michael Wright.

== Filmography ==
- Doghouse (2009) as The Teen
- Life is an Art (2010) as Claire Jones
- The Kid (2010) as Clare
- Amsterdam Heavy (2011) as Monique
- Amina (2012) as Lucy
- Devil's Tower (2014) as Fiona
- Gridiron UK (2015) as Jenny
- Swipe Right Horror (2016) as Michelle

Preceded by Karima McAdams	Lara Croft model 2008–2010	Succeeded by Position abolished
