= Fajah Lourens =

Dutch actress, model and DJ

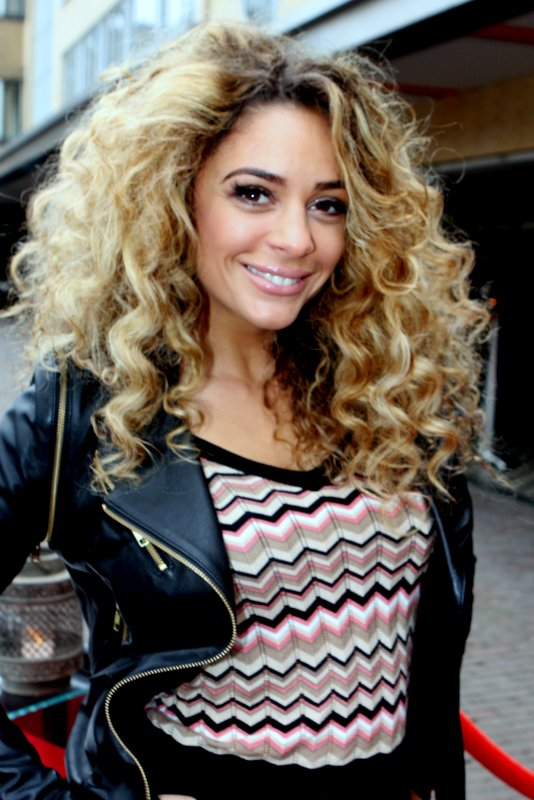
- Born: Fajah Hanna Nicole Lourens; July 3, 1981 (age 44); Amsterdam
- Occupations: Actress, model, disc jockey
- Years active: 2002 - present

Fajah Hanna Nicole Lourens (born July 3, 1981) is a Dutch actress, model and disc jockey.

== Career ==
She played the role of Yasmin Fuentes in the Dutch soap opera Goede tijden, slechte tijden for three seasons (2002–2005). Lourens had her film debut in Stiletto's (2011) and had a role in Amsterdam Heavy (2011).

She participated in So You Wanna Be a Popstar (2007), finishing tenth. Lourens was a participant in the third season of the Dutch version of 71 Degrees North, but the show was cancelled when host Ernst-Paul Hasselbach died during shooting. In 2012 Fajah Lourens competed in Expeditie Robinson.

Lourens began deejaying in 2011, performing at clubs such as Jimmy Woo, Panama, Beachclub Vroeger, Escape, Het Paard, Holland Casino, Cinema, and Off Corso. She is also active as a music producer.

In January 2011, it was announced that Lourens was cast in the action film Amsterdam Heavy by director Michael Wright.

In 2016, Lourens released her first book, The Killerbody Plan, a 12-week guide to getting fit. The book went on to be a best-seller.

== Filmography ==
Year	Title	Role	Notes
2001	Costa		
2002–2005	Goede tijden, slechte tijden	Yasmin Sanders-Fuentes	
2006	Shouf Shouf!	Kelly	
2011	Amsterdam Heavy	Agent Brandt	
2012	Als je verliefd wordt	Patty	
